= Mingma Gyalje Sherpa =

Nepalese Mountaineer

- Born: April 14, 1986 (age 40); Rolwaling, Nepal
- Other name: Mingma G
- Occupation: Mountaineer
- Known for: The first winter ascent of K2 in January 2021

Mingma Gyalje Sherpa (born 14 April 1986 , also known as Mingma G), is a Nepalese mountaineer. He was part of the first winter ascent of the eight-thousander mountain, K2, in January 2021. In October 2024, he became the first Nepalese mountaineer, alongside Nirmal Purja, to climb all 14 eight-thousanders without using supplemental oxygen.

== Early life ==
Mingma Gyalje Sherpa was born in the Rolwaling valley in Nepal. He grew up in a family of mountain guides with his father, grandfather and uncle all being mountain guides.

== Climbing career ==
Mingma Gyalje's climbing career began in 2006 with an attempt on Manaslu, the world's 8th-highest mountain, as part of his uncle's expedition, where he reached an altitude of 7,300m. The following year he achieved his first successful summit of an eight-thousander mountain when he climbed Mount Everest. In April 2015, he summited Annapurna I whilst fixing ropes from Camp 1 to the summit.

On 28 October 2015, Mingma G achieved the first ascent of Chobutse's West Face, which he did as a solo climb. This was the first time a first ascent of a new Himalayan climbing route was established in a solo form by a Nepalese climber. He named the route in memory of his deceased father, naming it the 'Dorjee Sherpa' route.

During 2017, Mingma G climbed five 8,000m mountains in a single calendar year. He ascended Dhaulagiri I on 30 April, Makalu on 14 May, K2 on 28 July, Broad Peak on 4 August and Nanga Parbat on 2 October. His ascent of Nanga Parbat was the first ever recorded summit of Nanga Parbat to occur during the Autumn season. This was his second attempt on Nanga Parbat that year after an unsuccessful attempt in June.

=== First K2 winter ascent ===
Mingma Gyalje's first involvement in a winter attempt on K2 was during the 2019–2020 season. The team was unable to progress beyond 6,600 metres.

During the winter in January 2021, Mingma G returned to K2 as the leader of his team consisting of Kilu Pemba Sherpa and Dawa Tenjin Sherpa. His team united with a team led by Nirmal Purja to form a single team consisting of ten elite Nepalese mountaineers. They successfully reached the summit on 16 January at 5pm local time.

The feat of making the first winter ascent of K2 was regarded as 'one of the last great remaining challenges of Himalayan mountaineering' because K2 was the last remaining eight-thousander (8,000m) mountain to be climbed during the winter season. This was also the first winter ascent of an 8,000m mountain to be completed by an all-Nepalese team.

=== Manaslu ===
On 27 September 2021, Mingma G established a new route to the true summit of Manaslu. Previously most climbers had ventured only to the fore summit. Mingma Gyalje set a record for the highest number of successful summits on Manaslu without using supplemental oxygen, with 7 ascents.

=== 14 peaks without supplemental oxygen ===
On 4 October 2024, Mingma Gyalje, alongside Nirmal Purja, became the first Nepalese climbers to summit all 8,000m mountains without using supplemental oxygen. They decided to reach the summit together after media reported them as competitors.

=== 7 summits ===
On 27 December 2024, Mingma G completed the 7 Summits by summiting Aconcagua. This ascent meant Mingma G had climbed all 14 Peaks and 7 Summits without using supplemental oxygen.

== Rescue operations ==
During 2023, Mingma G was part of a rescue team on Shishapangma after two avalanches occurred. Mingma was injured during the rescue operation after he fell from near camp 3.

In 2026, Mingma G was the leading member of a rescue and recovery team from the 2026 Broad Peak avalanche which killed 10 mountaineers. Mingma G was climbing K2 when he aborted his attempt on the mountain to locate other mountaineers on the nearby Broad Peak using drones. Mingma G then chose to carry out the recovery operation on foot after other teams aborted because of highly dangerous conditions and helicopters had been grounded because of severe weather. Mingma and his team recovered four bodies including his former climbing partners Nirmal Purja and Kili Pemba Sherpa.

== See also ==
- Mingma Gyabu Sherpa (Mingma David)
- Nirmal Purja
- Kilu Pemba Sherpa
