= Mingma Tenzi Sherpa =

Nepali mountaineer (born 1984)

- Mingma Tenzi Sherpa in Kathmandu

Personal information
- Nationality: Nepali
- Born: 1984 (age 41–42) Yaphu, Sankhuwasabha District, Nepal
- Occupations: Mountaineer, mountain guide

Climbing career
- Known for: First winter ascent of K2 (2021); Summiting all 14 eight-thousanders

Mingma Tenzi Sherpa (also spelled Mingma Tenji Sherpa; born 1984) is a Nepali mountaineer and high-altitude mountain guide. He was one of the ten Nepali climbers who made the first winter ascent of K2 on 16 January 2021, fixing rope on the final section to the summit. In October 2025, he completed ascents of all fourteen eight-thousanders.

== Early life and career ==
Mingma Tenzi was born in 1984 in Yaphu, a village in Sankhuwasabha District near Makalu. He reached his first eight-thousand-metre summits in May 2007, climbing Lhotse on 4 May and Mount Everest on 16 May.

By 2016, he was working as a sirdar (lead climbing Sherpa) for the Nepali operator Satori Adventures. In that role, he guided Indian climber Kuntal Joisher to the summit of Everest in May 2016 and Lhotse in May 2018. Joisher reported in 2018 that Mingma Tenzi had by then climbed eight of the fourteen eight-thousanders.

== First winter ascent of K2 ==
In the winter of 2020–21, Mingma Tenzi climbed on K2 as part of an all-Nepali expedition led by Nirmal Purja. K2 was at the time the only eight-thousander that had not been summited in winter.

On 30 December 2020, prior to complete acclimatisation, he assisted Mingma Gyalje Sherpa's team in fixing lines to the icy section below Camp 3. On 15 January 2021, Mingma Tenzi, Mingma Gyalje, Mingma David Sherpa, and Sona Sherpa fixed the route from Camp 3 to Camp 4 at 7,800 metres (25,600 ft), establishing the highest point reached on K2 in winter up to that date, with Mingma Tenzi leading the final metres to the Camp 4 site.

On 16 January, he departed Camp 3 in the lead group. He led through the traverse above the Bottleneck and fixed rope along the remaining route from a plateau 200 metres below the top. Approximately ten metres below the summit, the ten climbers halted to regroup and reached the top together at 4:43 pm, singing the Nepali national anthem. The summit team comprised Purja, Mingma Gyalje Sherpa, Mingma David Sherpa, Gelje Sherpa, Dawa Temba Sherpa, Pem Chhiri Sherpa, Kilu Pemba Sherpa, Dawa Tenjin Sherpa, Sona Sherpa, and Mingma Tenzi.

== Fourteen eight-thousanders ==
Following the K2 ascent, Mingma Tenzi worked toward completing the fourteen eight-thousanders, sponsored by the Italian apparel brand Save The Duck as part of an initiative to climb them in animal-free outerwear.

In October 2024, he guided Qatari climber Asma Al Thani to the true summit of Shishapangma. He completed the fourteen eight-thousanders on 1 October 2025 upon summiting Cho Oyu at age 41, having also recorded eleven Everest summits by that time.

== Business ==
Through 2025, Mingma Tenzi served as a director of the commercial mountaineering company Elite Exped, operating alongside co-founders Nirmal Purja and Mingma David Sherpa.

== See also ==
- List of Mount Everest summiters by number of times to the summit
- List of climbers of all 14 eight-thousanders
