= Beyond Possible =

2020 book by Nirmal Purja

Beyond Possible: One Soldier, Fourteen Peaks - My Life in the Death Zone
- Author: Nirmal Purja
- Language: English
- Subject: Travel literature Autobiography
- Genre: Nonfiction
- Published: 12 November 2020
- Publisher: National Geographic Society and Hodder & Stoughton
- Publication place: United Kingdom/United States
- Media type: Hardcover
- Pages: 320
- ISBN: 978-1-4262-2253-5

Beyond Possible: One Soldier, Fourteen Peaks - My Life in the Death Zone is a non-fiction book by Nirmal Purja.

== Background ==
In this book, British Nepalese climber Nirmal Purja delivers a compelling narrative of his achievement in scaling the "Earth's fourteen Death Zone peaks" within an unprecedented timeframe.

== Reception ==
The Hindu's Indrani Dutta writes, "He [The author] chronicles his journey of six months and six days in Beyond Possible which should be read not only to learn the ropes that takes one to a summit, but also perhaps as a management lesson on how to overcome every obstacle that comes between a man and his mission."

Jenny Coad, the associate travel editor at The Times and The Sunday Times writes, "Reading this [book], you cannot doubt, for one second, that Purja has earned every peak and plaudit with blood, sweat and no tears."

Writing for Plainsman, Roshiela Moonsamy writes, "The story is told in a conversational style, almost like a fireside chat, with Nims sharing his life story, from growing up in Nepal to following in the footsteps of his father and brothers who also served as Gurkhas and how being a soldier helped him psychologically to take on the dangers of high altitude climbing."
