= Sohail Sakhi =

Pakistani mountaineer and mountain guide (1992–2026)

Personal information
- Nationality: Pakistani
- Born: 1993 Aliabad, Hunza, Gilgit-Baltistan, Pakistan
- Died: 30 July 2026 (aged 32–33) Broad Peak, Gilgit-Baltistan, Pakistan
- Occupations: Mountaineer, mountain guide and expedition operator

Climbing career
- Major ascents: K2, Kangchenjunga, Nanga Parbat, Gasherbrum I, Gasherbrum II

Sohail Sakhi (1993 – 30 July 2026) was a Pakistani mountaineer and expedition operator from Aliabad, Hunza, in Gilgit-Baltistan. Recognized as one of Pakistan's most accomplished high-altitude climbers, he completed multiple 8,000-metre ascents without supplemental oxygen, including K2, Nanga Parbat, Gasherbrum I, Gasherbrum II and Kangchenjunga. Beyond his climbing achievements, Sakhi worked as a rope-fixing team leader on major expeditions and campaigned for improved wages, training and working conditions for Pakistani mountain guides and porters.

== Early life ==
Sakhi was born in 1993 in Aliabad, in the Hunza Valley of Gilgit-Baltistan. His father, Sakhi Karim, worked as a mountain guide and died suddenly when Sohail was a teenager. Sakhi studied physics at COMSATS University in Islamabad but chose to return to the mountains rather than pursue work abroad. He also worked in mountain photography and drone operations.

== Mountain work and mountaineering ==
Sakhi began his career in Pakistan's mountain-tourism industry through expedition support work before progressing to trekking and mountaineering guide roles with Pakistani and international companies across the Karakoram. He joined Epic Expeditions in 2021, leading trips in the Hunza Valley, to the base camp of K2 and to Snow Lake, and guided an expedition to Island Peak in Nepal in 2023. Between 2021 and 2026, Sakhi completed no-oxygen ascents of five 8,000-metre peaks: Gasherbrum II (2021), K2 and Gasherbrum I (2022), Nanga Parbat (2025), and Kangchenjunga (2026). In July 2025, he was the only climber in Pakistan to summit two 8,000-metre peaks without bottled oxygen in a single season, completing both Nanga Parbat and K2 without oxygen or high-altitude support. During a 2025 expedition on Nanga Parbat, Sakhi assisted exhausted climbers and took part in a night rescue at Kinshofer Wall, according to famed Pakistani mountaineer Naila Kiani.

== Community work and advocacy ==
Sakhi campaigned for better wages, training, equipment and working conditions for Pakistani guides and high-altitude porters. In an August 2025 ExplorersWeb profile, he called for the establishment of climbing schools and argued that rope-fixing teams should be compensated by climbers who benefited from their work.

In 2024, Sakhi co-founded Hostel Nomads in Hunza and established the expedition company Moving Mountains to create locally based opportunities in guiding and adventure tourism. He taught rock climbing to young people in Hunza and established the hostel as a meeting place for local mountaineers.

== Death ==
On 30 July 2026, an avalanche struck a ten-member international expedition on Broad Peak. The expedition included Sakhi, his client, American climber Sarah Mallory Geis, and the Nepali-British mountaineer Nirmal Purja. Later it was announced that all 10 climbers had been killed.

Local volunteers recovered Sakhi's body in August and he was subsequently transported to Skardu. He was buried in Aliabad after funeral prayers attended by family members, local residents and officials.

The Government of Gilgit-Baltistan announced a payment of Rs 3 million to Sakhi's family under an insurance policy for mountaineers. Tributes from the international climbing community highlighted his technical skill, ethical approach to guiding, and commitment to developing Pakistani mountaineering talent.

== See also ==
- 2026 Broad Peak avalanche
- List of deaths on eight-thousanders
- List of avalanches by death toll
