= Untamed Romania =

2018 British-Romanian nature documentary film

- Romanian: România neîmblânzită
- Directed by: Thomas Barton-Humphreys
- Screenplay by: Thomas Barton-Humphreys; Alex Păun
- Produced by: Allison Bean; Alex Păun; Ellen Windemuth; Ionuț Ardeleanu; Paul Lister
- Narrated by: Mark Strong; Victor Rebengiuc
- Cinematography: John Waters
- Edited by: Dan Schwalm
- Music by: Nainita Desai
- Production companies: Off the Fence, Auchan, T.E.N.T.
- Distributed by: Transilvania Film; Journeyman Pictures
- Release date: 2018
- Running time: 90 minutes
- Countries: United Kingdom; Romania
- Languages: English; Romanian
- Budget: $1.5 million

Untamed Romania is a 2018 British–Romanian nature documentary film directed by Thomas Barton-Humphreys. It is a collaborative effort by the production house Off the Fence, the corporation Auchan, and The European Nature Trust environmental foundation. Released in distinct English and Romanian versions (the latter under the title România neîmblânzită), the film highlights the natural wonders of Romanian flora and fauna, and promotes scientific knowledge about and care for the environment.

== Synopsis ==
Untamed Romania provides insight into the stunning natural wonders of Romania, with the Carpathian Mountains, the Danube Delta, and Transylvania as its major areas of interest.

== Versions ==
Untamed Romania is available in two versions: one in English (narrated by actor Mark Strong) and one in Romanian (narrated by actor Victor Rebengiuc). Neither version is a dubbing of the other. Besides voice-over, Untamed România and România neîmblânzită also feature small differences in script. The ending of the Romanian version has been written by producer Alex Păun, while the ending of the international version belongs to the director Thomas Barton-Humphreys.

== Soundtrack ==
The soundtrack of Untamed Romania is an original creation by British composer Nainita Desai. Once written, the tracks have been recorded in two stages: some with a group of 16 professional instrument players in London; the other in Cardiff, with the BBC National Orchestra of Wales. The Cardiff session employed 73 instrument players. Before joining the Untamed Romania production crew, Desai composed the scores for several films, mostly documentaries, including many that received awards or nominations at the Academy Awards, the Cannes Film Festival, the BAFTA Awards, and the Emmy Awards. Desai also wrote the title theme for BBC's broadcast of the wedding of Prince Harry and Meghan Markle.

== Scientific content ==
To ensure the scientific accuracy of the film, director Thomas Barton-Humphreys cooperated with a team of British researchers. The resulting script has been further reviewed by Romanian experts. They are Ioan Coroiu (doctor in biology), Paulina Anastasiu (doctor in biology), Carmen Postolache (Dean of the Faculty of Biology at the University of Bucharest), and Constantin Ciubuc (doctor in biology).

== Release ==
The English version of the documentary premiered on 18 March 2018 in Washington, D.C., at the Environmental Film Festival in the Nation's Capital. An event followed in London, with the British Academy of Film and Television Arts hosting a screening on 9 May 2018.

The Romanian version premiered on 21 March 2018 at the National Theatre in Bucharest, which hosted a gala screening with 800 guests (including the Romanian President, Klaus Iohannis). An audience of 2,500 people attended a screening at the Transylvania International Film Festival in Cluj on 27 May 2018.

The official release date of Untamed Romania is 13 August 2019, when the film began streaming on Amazon Prime, iTunes, Google Play, and Vimeo. The official release date of România neîmblânzită is 13 April 2018, when it entered local cinemas.

== National screenings ==
Among the documentaries in its category, Untamed Romania is the first to be distributed in local theaters, running for 16 weeks starting 13 April 2018. According to news outlets such as Adevărul and Spot Media, the film attracted 81,538 viewers and generated 236.428 euros worth of ticket sales (which are high figures in Romanian film industry). However, the actual number of viewers is difficult to estimate, since the documentary also enjoyed a series of free-entry open air screenings in the summer of 2018, in towns that lack movie theatres.

== International screenings ==
Between March 2018 and March 2021, Untamed Romania enjoyed 95 international public screenings. 54 events were hosted in Europe (Belgium, Bulgaria, Bosnia and Herzegovina, Estonia, Finland, France, Germany, Hungary, Italy, Lithuania, Netherlands, Poland, Portugal, Slovakia, Slovenia, Ukraine, United Kingdom), 20 events were hosted in Asia (Afghanistan, Armenia, Azerbaijan, Indonesia, Japan, Jordan, Kazakhstan, Turkey), 19 events were hosted in the Americas (Argentina, Colombia, Costa Rica, Jamaica, Mexico, Peru, United States), 2 events were held in Africa (South Africa, Tunisia). In total, they amount to 34 countries on four continents. An exhaustive list of screenings was published in January 2021 by the Romanian desk of Radio France Internationale.

== Digital streaming ==
On 13 August 2019, the film was released via Amazon Prime, iTunes, Google Play, and Vimeo. Amazon made it available in 120 countries, iTunes in 70 countries, Google in 7 English-speaking countries, and Vimeo worldwide. On 20 February 2020, the documentary became globally available on Netflix. Romanian viewers can access the Romanian-language version, while the English-language version is accessible in all other countries.

== Subtitles ==
The international distribution of the film has also been spurred by its three high-quality official subtitles. For Spanish, the production crew employed translator Elena Borrás. For Italian, it involved Bruno Mazzoni, a distinguished Romanian culture specialist from Italy. For French, the producers worked with writer Nicolas Cavaillès.

== Accolades ==
Untamed Romania received the silver award for the "fight against climate change" at the Deauville Green Awards in France in June 2019. In July 2019, at the German festival NaturVision, the film's music was named "best documentary soundtrack." In February 2020, Nainita Desai was named "breakthrough composer of the year" by the International Film Music Critics Association, with the jury stating they were especially impressed by her contribution to Untamed Romania.
