= Kim Chang-ho =

Kim Chang-ho may refer to:

- Kim Chang-ho (table tennis)
- Kim Chang-ho (climber)
