= 14 Peaks: Nothing Is Impossible =

2021 mountaineering documentary film

- Release poster
- Directed by: Torquil Jones
- Written by: Gabriel Clarke; Torquil Jones
- Produced by: John McKenna; Barry Smith; Drew Masters; Catherine Quantschnigg; Mark Webber
- Starring: Nirmal Purja
- Edited by: Ian Grech
- Music by: Nainita Desai
- Production company: Noah Media Group
- Distributed by: Netflix
- Release date: 29 November 2021
- Running time: 101 minutes
- Countries: United Kingdom; United States
- Languages: Nepali; English

14 Peaks: Nothing Is Impossible is a 2021 documentary film directed by Torquil Jones, and produced by Noah Media Group, Little Monster Films and Torquil Jones with Nirmal Purja, Jimmy Chin and Elizabeth Vasarhelyi as executive producers. The film follows Nepalese mountaineer Nirmal Purja and his team as they attempt to climb all 14 eight-thousander peaks within a then record time of under seven months. The previous record was 7 years and 310 days held by South Korean climber Kim Chang.

A significant portion of the footage was taken by the expedition team, while additional images and interviews were added later by the director, including interviews with Reinhold Messner (who called the feat "a unique statement in the history of mountaineering"), and other major high-altitude mountaineers, and Purja's family (including his wife and brothers). The film premiered at the DOC NYC Film Festival, and was released on Netflix on 29 November 2021.

== Background ==
The documentary is about Project Possible, a plan by Nepali high altitude climber Nirmal Purja to climb all of the world's 14 highest peaks with an altitude greater than 8,000 metres (26,247 ft) (called eight-thousanders) inside 7 months (i.e. from early spring to late summer, before the winter season begins). The actual climbing took 6 months and 6 days between April 2019 to October 2019. The first person to climb the 14 eight-thousanders was Italian climber Reinhold Messner who took 16 years between 1970 and 1986 and completed the feat without using supplementary oxygen. By 2013, the feat had been achieved in 7 years and 310 days by South Korean climber Kim Chang, who also did not use supplementary oxygen. Purja decided to use oxygen above 7,500 metres (24,600 ft) for Project Possible based on prior experiences when not using oxygen on past eight-thousander climbs would have stopped him from saving the lives of stricken climbers (something he ended up doing several times during the project). In 2021, when leading a larger all-Nepali team to complete the first winter ascent of K2, Purja did not use oxygen.

Messner appears several times in the film talking about eight-thousanders and what Purja was trying to do; Purja met Messner after suffering a bad fall on Nanga Parbat but Messner gave him encouragement to keep going, with Purja recounting: "He looked into my eyes and said, 'You can do it'. He told me to my face, and he hadn't even seen my climb. When he did the 8000-ers, the whole mountaineering community was against him, but he proved the concept. He did it when the world couldn't see his vision". He set the record of climbing 14 peaks.

== Synopsis ==
The documentary begins on April 23, 2019, with Purja attempting Annapurna, statistically, the most dangerous eight-thousander. Purja joins with Canadian climber Don Bowie who has failed several times on Annapurna. However, Purja encourages Bowie to come with his team and they are successful summiting on 23 April, with Bowie saying "This guy believed they were gonna do it, and they pushed thru". The following day, Purja returns up the mountain to rescue a stricken climber (later identified as Malaysian climber Wui Kin Chin) which is successful (although Chin would die days later in Singapore). The rescue meant Purja lost his "weather window" for Dhaulagiri, which his team summits in bad weather on 12 May. Purja then summits Kanchenjunga on 15 May in a single 22-hour push passing all camps. While descending from the summit, at 8,450 m (27,720 ft) and still in the death zone, Purja and his team encounter two stricken Indian climbers (later identified as Kuntal Karar and Biplab Baidya); despite giving them all their oxygen and waiting for 12 hours for help which never arrives, one dies in Purja's arms, while the other succumbs at camp 4 – Purja suffers HACE helping a third lost climber.

Behind schedule and questioning himself after the deaths on Annapurna and Kanchenjunga, Purja summits the three neighboring eight-thousanders of Everest on 22 May, Lhotse on 22 May, and Makalu on 24 May, in a record 48-hour push, taking a photograph of a large queue that had formed at the Hillary Step on Everest, which went viral and was re-printed on the front of the New York Times. The film breaks back to the period before the climbing started, with interviews from Purja's wife and brothers about his early life and career in the Gurkas and the Special Boat Squadron (SBS), and the sacrifices and financial risks that Purja took to create Project Possible. We also learn that his mother is unwell, and of a near-death experience from a sniper bullet to the face while on duty with the SBS.

Purja then moves to the Karakoram eight-thousanders summiting Nanga Parbat on 3 July, but taking a 100 m (300 ft) fall while descending that was only arrested when he managed to grab hold of a random fixed rope that had been left behind. Purja tells the camera: "I always say to myself, I'm not going to die today. Maybe tomorrow, but not today". He then summits Gasherbrum I on 15 July and Gasherbrum II 18 July. When Purja arrives at K2 (also one of the most dangerous eight-thousanders), spirits at Base Camp are very low, and high levels of avalanches meant that most teams are preparing to abandon their climbs. Purja's team breaks out some bottles and has a party to lift spirits. The next day, Purja and his team begin climbing K2 and lay down fixed ropes in the dangerous Bottleneck section of the climb at 1 am (when the snow is hardest and at its most stable). Purja summits K2 on 24 July, and over the next two days, 24 other climbers use the fixed ropes laid down by his team to summit the mountain. Two days later, Purja summits Broad Peak on 26 July, thus completing a 23-day push to climb the 5 eight-thousanders in the Karakoram.

Purja rushes back to Kathmandu to be with his mother who has suffered a heart attack. He then returns to summit Cho Oyu on 23 September, and Manaslu on 27 September. He then spends a few weeks lobbying Nepali politicians to help him secure a permit from the Chinese to climb Shishapangma in Tibet, which he successfully summits on 29 October 2019. Purja calls his now dying mother from the summit "we did it". Later we see Purja reunited with his mother and the world's media to celebrate the conclusion of his Project Possible.

=== Records set ===
- Fastest ascent of all 14 eight-thousanders in 6 months and 6 days with supplementary oxygen (the previous record was 7 years and 310 days by South Korean climber Kim Chang-Ho; Purja's record would itself be broken in 2023 by Kristin Harila and Tenjen Sherpa, who completed the summits in 92 days).
- Fastest ascent of the 5 highest eight-thousanders in 70 days (the record for climbing without supplementary oxygen is 4 years and 219 days by Spanish brothers Alberto Iñurrategi and Felix Iñurrategi).
- Fastest triple-header of Everest, Lhotse and Makalu in 2 days and 30 minutes (Purja was the previous record holder from 2017).

== Cast ==
The documentary features:

- Nirmal Purja (as Nimsdai)
- Suchi Purja (Nirmal Purja's wife)
- Kamal Purja (Nirmal Purja's brother)
- Mingma Gyabu Sherpa, climbing team
- Geljen Sherpa, climbing team
- Lakpa Dendi Sherpa, climbing team
- Gesman Tamang, climbing team
- Reinhold Messner, climber interviewed about the project
- Jimmy Chin, climber and film maker interviewed about the project
- Klára Poláčková, climber interviewed about the project
- Don Bowie, climber interviewed about the project
- Garrett Madison, climber interviewed about the project

== Production ==
Purja told Climbing that Project Possible was a way of countering the constant skepticism he encountered before starting, and particularly raising sponsorship for the project, as he struggled to convince investors that his goals were realistic and that he was the climber to achieve them. When he summited the first peak, Annapurna I on 23 April 2019, Purja had only locked down 15 percent of the financing he needed, and most of this money had come from remortgaging his own UK house. However, as the climbing developed, Purja was able to raise funds both through GoFundMe campaigns, and corporate sponsorship (e.g. rebranding the project as Bremont Project Possible). Purja told Redbull, "It's been one financial risk after the other", and "I always say this project has been 'horrifically amazing'".

During the project, Purja was supported by a rotating team of Nepalese climbers, several of whom are introduced in the film, including Mingma David Sherpa, Geljen Sherpa, Lakpa Dendi Sherpa, and Gesman Tamang, however, only Purja would complete the summit of all 14 eight-thousanders during the film.

14 Peaks: Nothing Is Impossible was compiled from the 100 hours of footage taken by Purja and the Nepalese climbing team from April to October 2019. Director Torquil Jones combined Purja's footage, archive footage, animation, and interviews. British-Indian composer Nainita Desai composed the film's score. 14 Peaks: Nothing Is Impossible is produced by Torquil Jones, and executively produced by Nirmal Purja, Jimmy Chin and Elizabeth Chai Vasarhelyi under the banner of Noah Media Group, Little Monster Films.

== Soundtrack ==
All music is composed by Nainita Desai.

14 Peaks: Nothing is Impossible (Soundtrack from the Netflix Film)
No.	Title	Length
1.	"14 Peaks – Opening"	1:27
2.	"The 8000ers"	2:15
3.	"Project Possible"	2:49
4.	"The First Summit"	2:11
5.	"Annapurna"	0:59
6.	"A Hero In The Making"	3:25
7.	"The Rescue"	2:00
8.	"Shot In Afghanistan"	1:04
9.	"HACE and the Yeti"	1:58
10.	"Life Decisions"	4:02
11.	"Climbing Everest"	1:59
12.	"Mountain Jam"	2:56
13.	"Breathe"	1:03
14.	"One Peak At A Time"	1:00
15.	"The Fall"	1:15
16.	"Savage Mountain"	1:46
17.	"Life And Death"	3:44
18.	"Mind Over Mountain"	1:10
19.	"Running Out of Air"	3:02
20.	"Swim To The Moon"	2:49
21.	"Abode Of God"	0:36
22.	"Nothing Is Impossible"	2:04
23.	"Mother and Son"	3:13
24.	"Himala Ko Choro"

Himala ko Choro (14 Peaks: Soundtrack) - Single
No.	Title	Lyrics	Music	Singer(s)	Length
1.	"Himala ko Choro"	Swapnil Sharma	Rohit Shakya	Swapnil Sharma	3:12

== Release ==
14 Peaks: Nothing Is Impossible's trailer was released on 2 November 2021. The film was first premiered at the DOC NYC Film Festival. It was released worldwide on 29 November 2021 on Netflix streaming.

== Critical response ==
On the review aggregator Rotten Tomatoes, the film holds an approval rating of 90% based on 10 reviews. Lisa Kennedy of The New York Times praised the film writing, the film "expands a genre often focused on the feats of individuals to celebrate lessons about vast dreams and communal bonds". The Los Angeles Times's Gary Goldstein noted that 14 Peaks: Nothing Is Impossible is a "uniquely stirring journey". Nell Minow writing for RogerEbert.com gave the film 3 out of 4 stars and penned that Nirmal Purja and his team "deserve to be as renowned as Sir Edmund Hillary, maybe more". Gary M. Kramer of Salon enthused over the film as it "motivates viewers to get off the couch and go climb a mountain". Pasang Dorjee of The Kathmandu Post said that he was awestruck "by the wonders that lie within your own country is a uniquely mesmerising feeling" and praised Nirmal Purja for his "courage, perseverance, and tenacity". Abhishek Srivastava of The Times of India applauded the film for carrying "a very strong message of teamwork, perseverance, dedication and national pride".

== Awards and nominations ==
Year	Award	Category	Recipient	Result	Ref(s)
2021	Hollywood Music in Media Awards	Best Original Score – Documentary	Nainita Desai	Nominated	
2022	British Academy Film Awards	Best Documentary	14 Peaks: Nothing Is Impossible	Longlisted	
2022	Primetime Creative Arts Emmy Awards	Outstanding Music Composition for a Documentary Series or Special (Original Dramatic Score)	Nainita Desai	Nominated	

== See also ==
- Eight-thousander, 8,000 metres (26,247 ft)
- Mountain, 2017 documentary about high altitude mountaineering
- Sherpa. 2015 documentary film about sherpa Phurba Tashi and the 2014 Mount Everest ice avalanche
- Beyond the Edge, 2013 documentary drama about first ascent of Everest
- The Summit, 2012 documentary film about the 2008 K2 disaster
