= Nainita Desai =

British composer of film, television and video game music

- Born: London, England
- Occupation: Composer
- Years active: 1998–present
- Website: https://nainitadesai.com/

Nainita Desai is a British composer of film, television and video game music. She is known for her scores for the films For Sama, The Reason I Jump and American Murder: The Family Next Door, and video game Telling Lies. In 2016, Nainita was named a BAFTA Breakthrough Brit.

== Life and career ==
Nainita was born and raised in London by her Indian parents. She holds a degree in mathematics and studied sound design at the National Film and Television School. She started her career as a sound designer on the films Little Buddha, Lessons of Darkness and Death Machine.

== Filmography ==
=== Selected films ===
- Little Terrorist (2004)
- Forced Confessions (2012)
- Molly (2014)
- Checkpost (2014)
- The Life After (2018)
- Anemone (2018)
- Untamed Romania (2018)
- //_sleeper (2018)
- Exit Eve (2019)
- Lab Rat (2019)
- Enemy Within (2019)
- Darkness Visible (2019)
- For Sama (2019)
- The Reason I Jump (2020)
- American Murder: The Family Next Door (2020)
- 14 Peaks: Nothing Is Impossible (2021)

=== Selected televisions ===
- The Confessions of Thomas Quick (2015)
- Treasures of the Indus (2015)
- Kolkata with Sue Perkins (2015)
- Cameraman to the Queen (2015)
- Mumbai High: The Musical (2015)
- African River Wild (2016)
- The Day Hitler Died (2016)
- Burma's Secret Jungle War with Joe Simpson (2016)
- The Murder of Sadie Hartley (2016)
- The Big Food Rescue (2016)
- Down the Mighty River with Steve Backshall (2017)
- Morocco to Timbuktu: An Arabian Adventure (2017)
- Cops UK: Bodycam Squad (2016-2017)
- First Ladies Revealed (2017)
- Inside London Fire Brigade (2017)
- My Family, Partition and Me: India 1947 (2017)
- Diana: The Day Britain Cried (2017)
- Tribes, Predators & Me (2016-2017)
- The Ganges with Sue Perkins (2017)
- Raped: My Story (2017)
- Extreme Wives with Kate Humble (2017)
- Wild Africa: Rivers of Life (2018)
- Earth's Natural Wonders (2018)

- My Dad, the Peace Deal and Me (2018)
- Catching a Killer (2017-2018)
- The Royal Wedding: Prince Harry and Meghan Markle (2018)
- Neighbourhood Blues (2011-2018)
- Trevor McDonald: Return to South Africa (2018)
- The Detectives: Inside the Major Crimes Team (2018)
- Extraordinary Rituals (2018)
- Am I a Murderer? (2018)
- Defenders UK (2018)
- David Jason: Planes, Trains & Automobiles (2019)
- Equator from the Air (2019)
- The 1900 Island (2019)
- The Day We Walked On The Moon (2019)
- My Grandparents' War (2019)
- My Family, the Holocaust and me (2020)
- Hometown (2019-2020)
- Fierce Queens (2020)
- Unprecedented: Real Time Theatre from a State of Isolation (2020)
- The School That Tried to End Racism (2020)
- Bad Boy Billionaires: India (2020)
- American Murder: The Family Next Door (2020)
- Enslaved (2020)
- Anton Ferdinand: Football, Racism and Me (2020)

=== Video game ===
- Telling Lies (2019)
- Immortality (2022)
- Call of Duty: Modern Warfare II (Season 3) (2023)
- Tales of Kenzera: Zau (2024)

== Awards and nominations ==
Year	Result	Award	Category	Work	Ref.
2019	Nominated	British Independent Film Awards	Best Music	For Sama	
2019	Won	NaturVision Film Festival	Best Score	Untamed Romania	
2019	Won	International Film Music Critics Association	Breakthrough Composer of the Year		
2019	Nominated	International Film Music Critics Association	Best Documentary Score	Untamed Romania	
2020	Won	Royal Television Society	Best Music - Original Score	For Sama	
2020	Nominated	Ivor Novello Awards	Best Original Film Score	For Sama	
2021	Nominated	British Independent Film Awards	Best Music	The Reason I Jump	
2021	Nominated	Cinema Eye Honors	Outstanding Original Score	The Reason I Jump	
2021	Nominated	Hollywood Music in Media Awards	Best Original Score in a Documentary	14 Peaks: Nothing Is Impossible	
2025	Won	ASCAP Composers' Choice Awards	Best Video Game Score	Tales of Kenzera: Zau	
