= Pur Bahadur Gurung =

Nepalese mountaineer (1988–2026)

Personal information
- Nationality: Nepali
- Born: 23 December 1988 Gorkha, Nepal
- Died: 30 July 2026 (aged 37) Broad Peak, Gilgit-Baltistan, Pakistan

Climbing career
- Known for: Climbed 4 eight thousanders of Pakistan in 12 days, Climbed K2 in 24 hours.

Pur Bahadur Gurung (known as Yukta or Yukta Tamu) (Nepali: पुरबहादुर गुरुङ; 23 December 1988 – 30 July 2026) was a Nepalese mountaineer and expedition guide, who had successfully climbed Mount Everest 10 times and also climbed 12 of the world’s 14 highest mountains. He completed a total of 28 ascents on mountains above 8,000 metres.

== Early life ==
Born in 1988 in northern Gorkha, he spent his childhood in the shadow of the Himalayas. Dreaming of joining the British Army, he was unable to pursue that ambition because of the Nepalese Civil War. He left home at a young age to work at a hotel in Manang, where he came into contact with trekking guides. Inspired by their profession, he later moved to Kathmandu to pursue a career as a trekking guide.

Gurung began working as a porter in 2009 and later served as a kitchen helper for camping groups. He subsequently advanced through the positions of assistant guide, trekking guide, and high-altitude expedition guide.

== Death ==
In 2026, Yukta travelled to Pakistan with nine other climbers including experienced Sherpa guides and mountaineers from Nepal which included Kili Pemba Sherpa, Nirmal Purja, Nima Sherpa among others.

On 30 July 2026, during their expedition, Gurung and nine other climbers in his group were caught in an avalanche on Broad Peak in Pakistan. On 31 July, the Alpine Club of Pakistan confirmed that he and the other nine climbers had died in the avalanche.

== See also ==
- Broad Peak
- 2026 Broad Peak avalanche
- List of deaths on eight-thousanders
