= Flight 193 =

Flight 193 may refer to:

- National Airlines Flight 193, crashed on 8 May 1978
- Tara Air Flight 193, crashed on 24 February 2016
