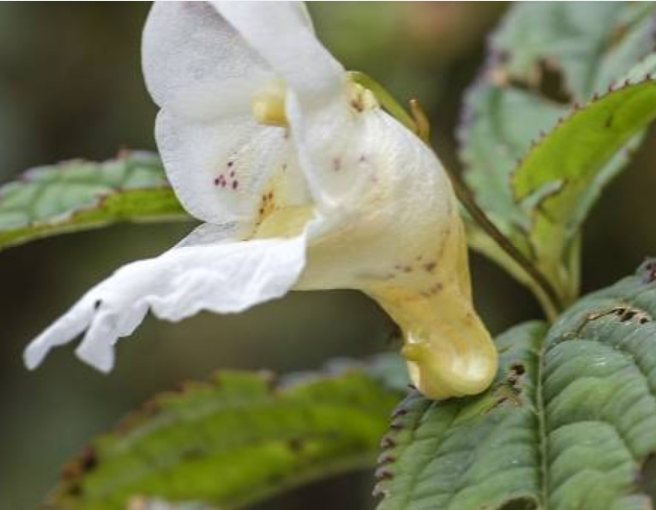

Scientific classification
- Kingdom: Plantae
- Clade: Tracheophytes
- Clade: Angiosperms
- Clade: Eudicots
- Clade: Asterids
- Order: Ericales
- Family: Balsaminaceae
- Genus: Impatiens
- Species: I. nimspurjae

Binomial name
- Impatiens nimspurjae Raskoti

= Impatiens nimspurjae =

Species of flowering plant

Impatiens nimspurjae is a species of flowering plant in the family Balsaminaceae. The species is an annual herb. It is native to western Nepal.

Impatiens nimspurjae was described in 2022, and named after the mountaineer Nirmal Purja. It is threatened by human activity.

== Distribution ==
Impatiens nimspurjae is native to the subtropical biome of Nepal. The species is endemic to western Nepal. It grows on moist, humus rich slopes, in temperate forests and forest edges, at elevations of 2,800–2,900 metres (9,200–9,500 ft).

== Taxonomy ==
Impatiens nimspurjae was named in 2022. The type specimens were collected in 2011, in Nepal's Myagdi District, at elevations of 2,800–2,900 metres (9,200–9,500 ft).

Impatiens nimspurjae is closely related to Impatiens harae, Impatiens radiata, and Impatiens wallichii.

== Description ==
Impatiens nimspurjae is an annual herb. It grows 12–99 centimetres (0.39–3.25 ft) in height.

The leaves are hairless, and oblong in shape. They measure 1.5–11 centimetres (0.59–4.33 in) long, and 0.5–3 centimetres (0.20–1.18 in) wide. The leaves lack stalks. The stems are smooth.

The inflorescences grow on 1.5–6 centimetres (0.59–2.36 in) long stalks, and have two or three flowers. The flowers are white, with some petals having yellowish or purple parts. The flowers are 1.5–2 centimetres (0.59–0.79 in) long. Flowering occurs from July to October.

The fruits are 1.5–2.5 centimetres (0.59–0.98 in) long. Fruiting occurs fron July to October. The seeds are brownish and ovoid.

== Etymology ==
Impatiens nimspurjae is named after the Nepalese mountaineer Nirmal Purja (nicknamed "Nimsdai"), recognising his work on climate change.

== Conservation ==
Impatiens nimspurjae is threatened by habitat disturbance from human activity. The researchers who described the species classified it as Data Deficient.
