= Gurja Himal =

Mountain in Nepal

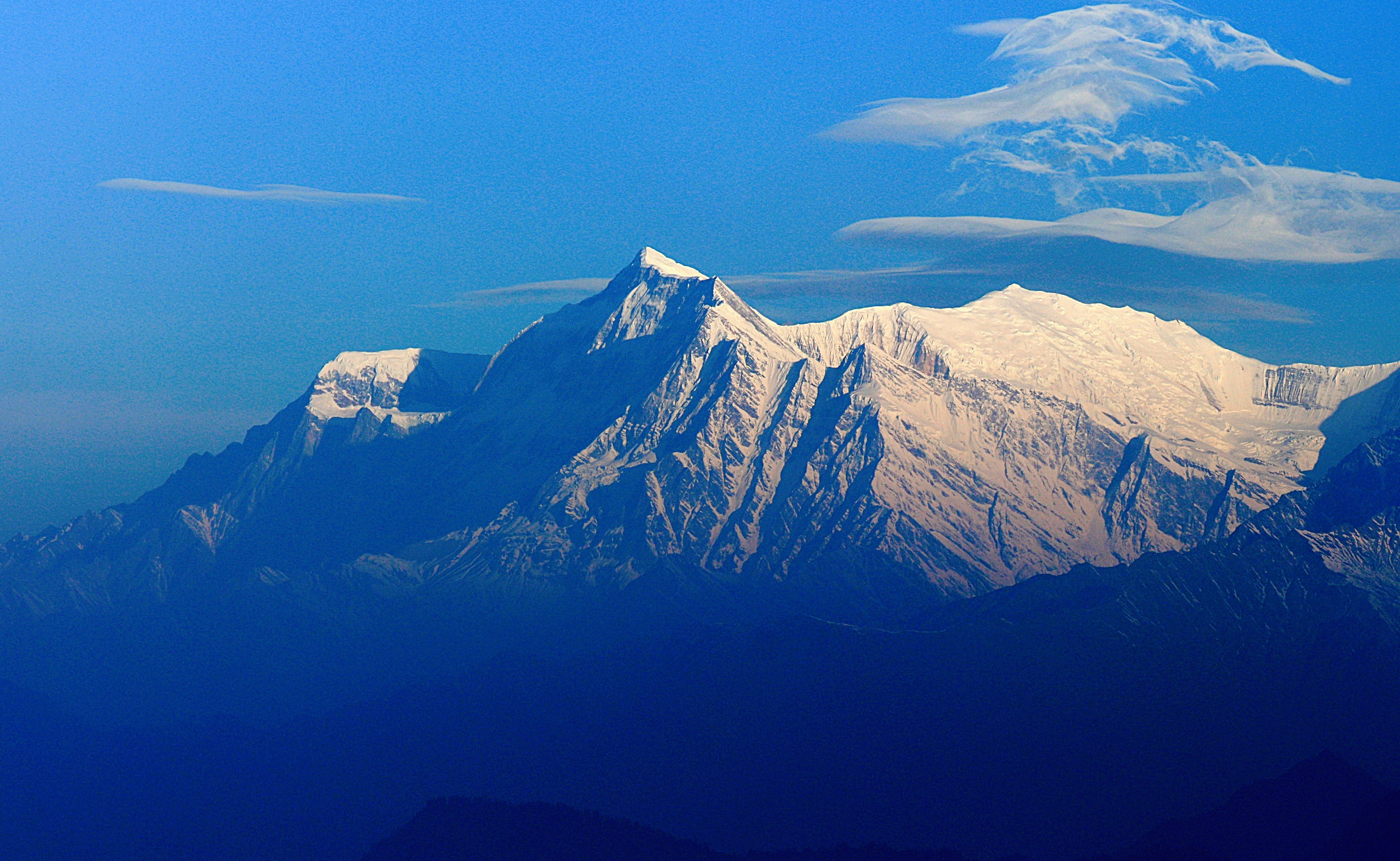
- Gurja Himal (center) viewed from the southeast (Poon Hill)

Highest point
- Elevation: 7,193 m (23,599 ft)
- Prominence: 474 m (1,555 ft)
- Listing: Mountains of Nepal
- Coordinates: 28°40′01″N 83°18′01″E

Naming
- Native name: गुर्जा हिमाल (Nepali)

Geography
- Location within Nepal
- Country: Nepal
- Province: Gandaki
- District: Myagdi
- Parent range: Dhaulagiri

Climbing
- First ascent: 1 November 1969

Gurja Himal (Nepali: गुर्जा हिमाल) is a mountain in Gandaki Province, Nepal. Gurja Himal is part of the Dhaulagiri massif and it has an elevation of 7,193 metres (23,599 ft).

In 2018, an avalanche from the mountain killed nine people which was labelled as the worst climbing disaster in Nepal after the 2015 Mount Everest avalanches. One of the victims was South Korean mountain climber Kim Chang-ho.

Gurja Himal was first climbed on 1 November 1969 by a Japanese expedition.
