= Tara Air Flight 193 =

2016 passenger plane crash in Dana, Nepal

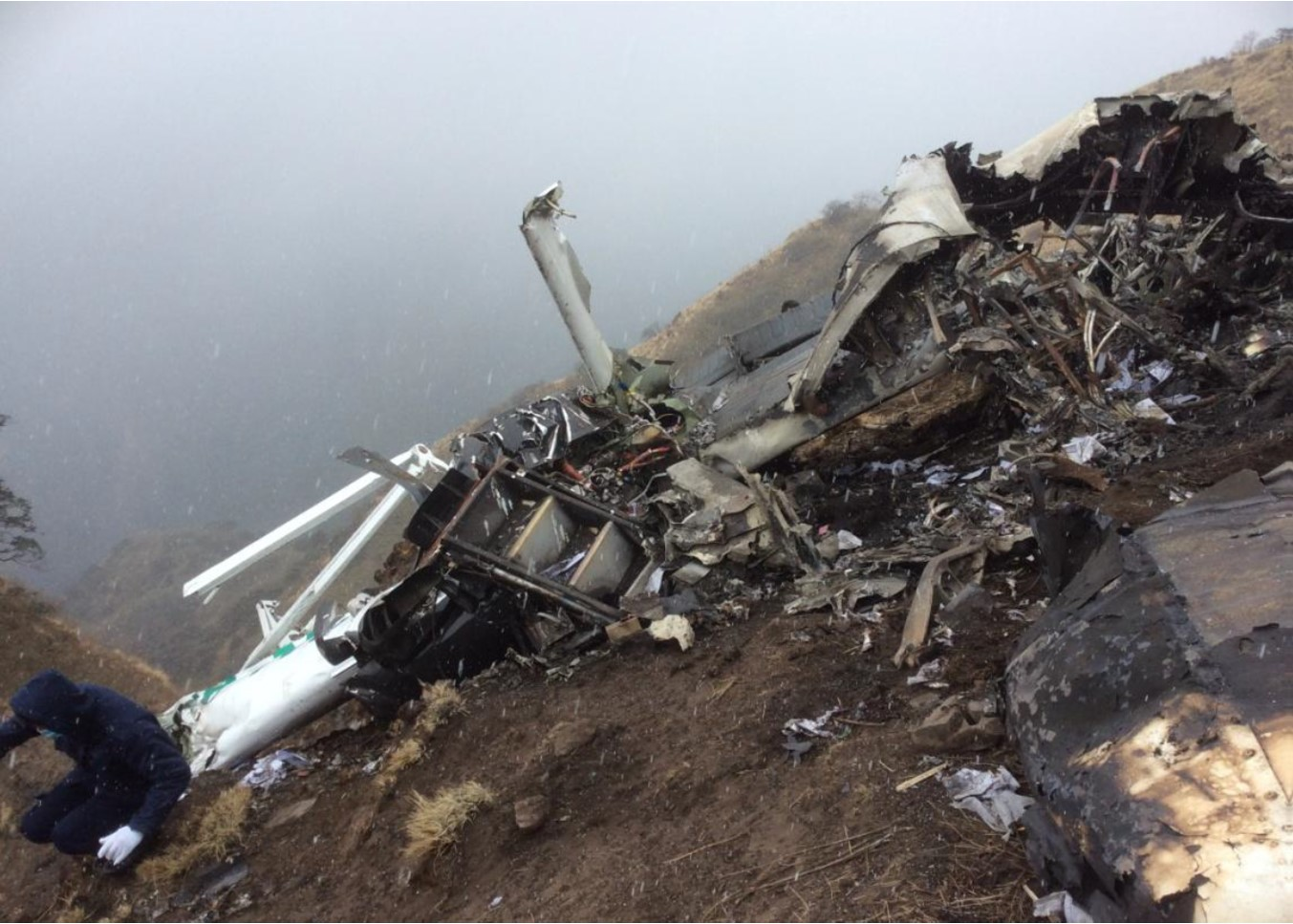
- Main wreckage area

Accident
- Date: 24 February 2016
- Summary: VFR into IMC, loss of situational awareness, CFIT
- Site: Dana, Myagdi District, Nepal; 28°32′17″N 83°37′16″E

Aircraft
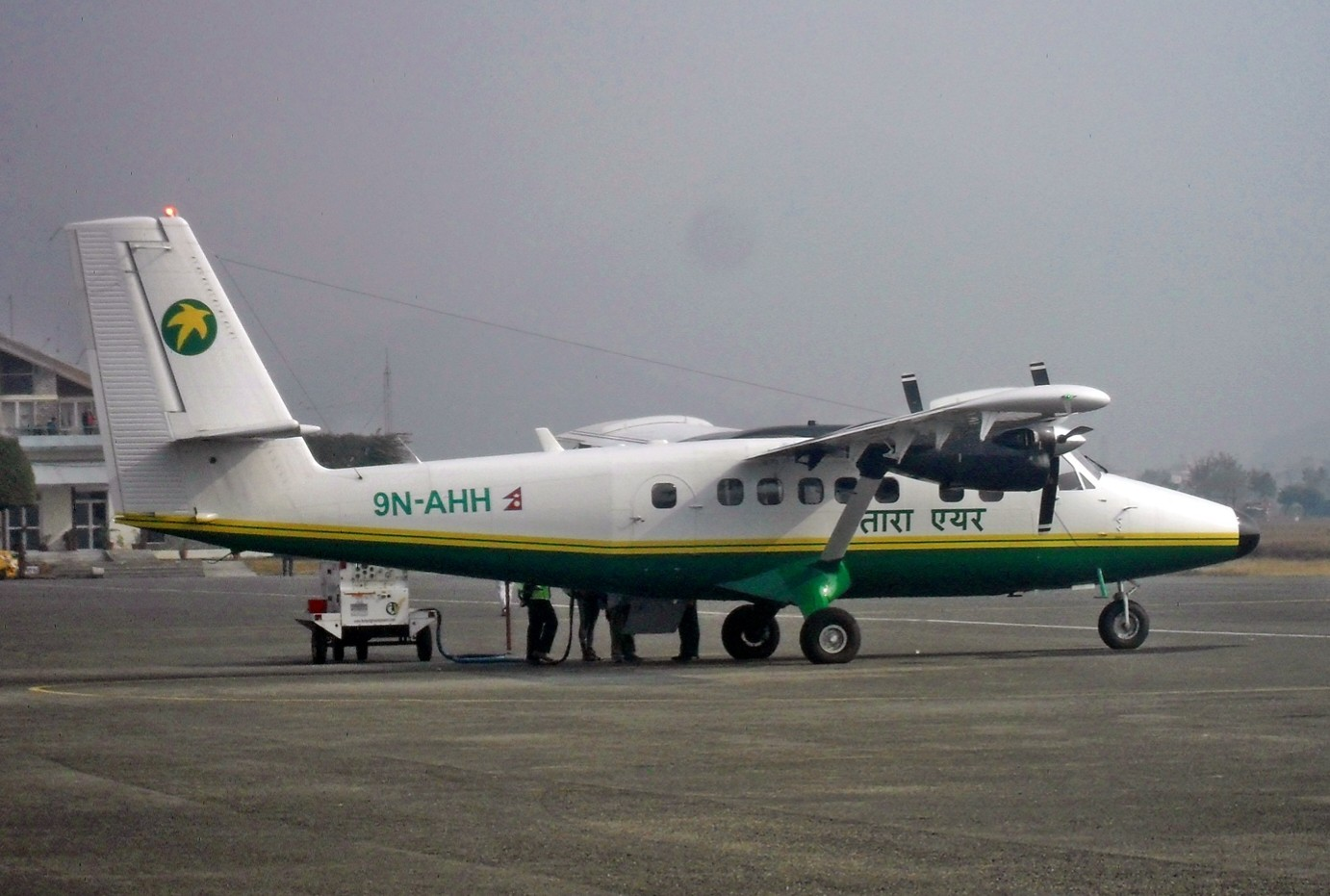
- 9N-AHH, the aircraft involved seen on the day of the accident before departure from Pokhara Airport
- Aircraft type: Viking Air DHC-6-400 Twin Otter
- Operator: Tara Air
- IATA flight No.: TB193
- ICAO flight No.: TRA193
- Call sign: Tara Air 193
- Registration: 9N-AHH
- Flight origin: Pokhara Airport, Pokhara, Nepal
- Destination: Jomsom Airport, Jomsom, Nepal
- Occupants: 23
- Passengers: 20
- Crew: 3
- Fatalities: 23
- Survivors: 0

Tara Air Flight 193 was a scheduled domestic passenger flight from Pokhara to Jomsom, Nepal. On 24 February 2016, eight minutes after take-off, the aircraft serving the flight, a Viking Air DHC-6-400 Twin Otter went missing with 23 people on board. Hours later, the wreckage was found near the village of Dana, Myagdi District. There were no survivors. It was Tara Air's deadliest accident.

== Aircraft ==
The DHC-6 Twin Otter was a Series 400 version built in 2012 by Viking Air with manufacturer's serial number 926. In September 2015, it was delivered to Tara Air and registered 9N-AHH.

== Passengers ==
Of the 20 passengers on board, 18 – including 2 children – were from Nepal, one was from Hong Kong, and another was from Kuwait.

== Flight ==
Map of Nepal showing the crash site between the departure airport (Pokhara) and the intended destination (Jomson)

The aircraft took off from Pokhara at 7:50 am local time. The normal flight duration on the route is 18 minutes. The control tower officers at Pokhara lost contact with the aircraft 10 minutes after takeoff; the wreckage was found at Tirkhe Dhunga, Dana VDC of Myagdi district at 1:25 pm by a police team deployed from Dana Police Post. Tara Air reported that the weather at both origin and destination airports was favourable.

During the flight, the co-pilot acted as the Pilot Flying and the captain as Pilot Monitoring. En route, the flight deviated to the left and climbed to 12,000 feet (3,658 m) to avoid clouds. Over the Ghorepani area, the Ground Proximity Warning System (GPWS) began to sound. The aircraft was flying through clouds with a little visibility between clouds. A descent to 10,000 feet (3,048 m) was initiated and at 10,200 feet (3,109 m) the GPWS sounded again, but the captain responded not to worry about it. The captain was accustomed to hearing GPWS warnings in normal flight, so it became a habit to disregard the warnings. About one minute before the accident the captain took over control and initiated a climb. The aircraft impacted a mountainside at 10,700 feet (3,261 m) and came to a rest at 10,982 feet (3,347 m) near Dana village, Myagdi district. Aviation Safety Network gives the probable cause as a loss of situational awareness when entering clouds while flying under Visual Flight Rules (VFR).

== Recovery ==
Helicopters were used to search the route for hours, but rescue efforts were slowed down by poor weather conditions, including dense fog and heavy rain. The wreckage was found burning after impacting a mountainside, with charred bodies visible inside. Bishwa Raj Khadka, the district Chief of Police, stated that personnel involved in the rescue operations had recovered 17 bodies from the crash site. Ukrainian traveler and TV presenter Dmytro Komarov, together with the team of the program "The Upside Down World" (Ukrainian: Світ Навиворіт) also took part in the search operation.

== Investigation ==
A commission was formed to investigate the crash. The wreckage was found spread about 200 meters (660 feet) in Solighopte, Myagdi District, Dhaulagiri Zone.

The final accident report, 17 months later, read: "The Commission concludes that the probable cause of this accident was the fact that despite unfavourable weather conditions, the crew's repeated decision to enter into cloud during VFR flight and their deviation from the normal track due to loss of situational awareness aggravated by spatial disorientation leading to CFIT accident."

== See also ==
- Prinair Flight 277
- Tara Air Flight 197
