= Don Bowie (climber) =

Canadian mountaineer (born 1969)

Don Bowie (born December 9, 1969) is a professional high altitude climber from Alberta, Canada. Bowie's climbing endeavors have taken him to remote regions of Nepal, Pakistan, Tibet, Africa, South America, Mexico, USA, and the high-arctic of Canada. In addition to being a world-class alpinist, he is an expert ski-mountaineer, avid mountain biker, long-distance trail-runner, and develops various projects portraying his climbing exploits as a writer, filmmaker, and photographer. Bowie now lives in Bishop, California, where he serves as an active member of the Inyo County Sheriff Search and Rescue Team.

== Expedition Highlights ==
- 2005 Broad Peak (8047m/26,401 ft) Karakoram, Pakistan, West Ridge, Solo (to 7800m)
- 2006 Cho Oyu (8188m/26,863 ft) Tibet Himalaya, Polish Ridge variation (to 8000m)
- 2006 Annapurna (8091m/26,545 ft) Nepal Himalaya, East Ridge, new route (to 7300m)
- 2007 K2 (8611m/28,253 ft) Karakoram, Pakistan, new route (to 6800m) Abruzzi Spur (summit)
- 2008 Annapurna (8091m/26,545 ft) Nepal Himalaya, South Face/East Ridge (to 7300m)
- 2008 Distaghil Sar (7886m/25,256 ft) Hispar Range, Pakistan, new route attempt
- 2008 unnamed peak (5811m/19,065) Hispar, Pakistan, first ascent (summit)
- 2008 unnamed peak (6347m/20,823 ft) Hispar, Pakistan, second ascent (summit)
- 2008/9 Broad Peak (8047m/26,401 ft) Karakoram, Pakistan, West Ridge, in winter (to 7000m)
- 2009 Gasherbrum III (7952m/26,089 ft) Karakoram, Pakistan, North Face, new route (to 7300m)
- 2010 Gasherbrum I (8068m/26,650 ft) Karakoram Range, Pakistan, Japanese Couloir (summit)
- 2011 Cho Oyu (summit) with Ueli Steck
- 2019 Annapurna (Summit) after 6 attempts

== See also ==
- 14 Peaks: Nothing Is Impossible, 2021 climbing film in which Bowie appears while climbing Annapurna
