= Kuntal Joisher =

Indian mountaineer

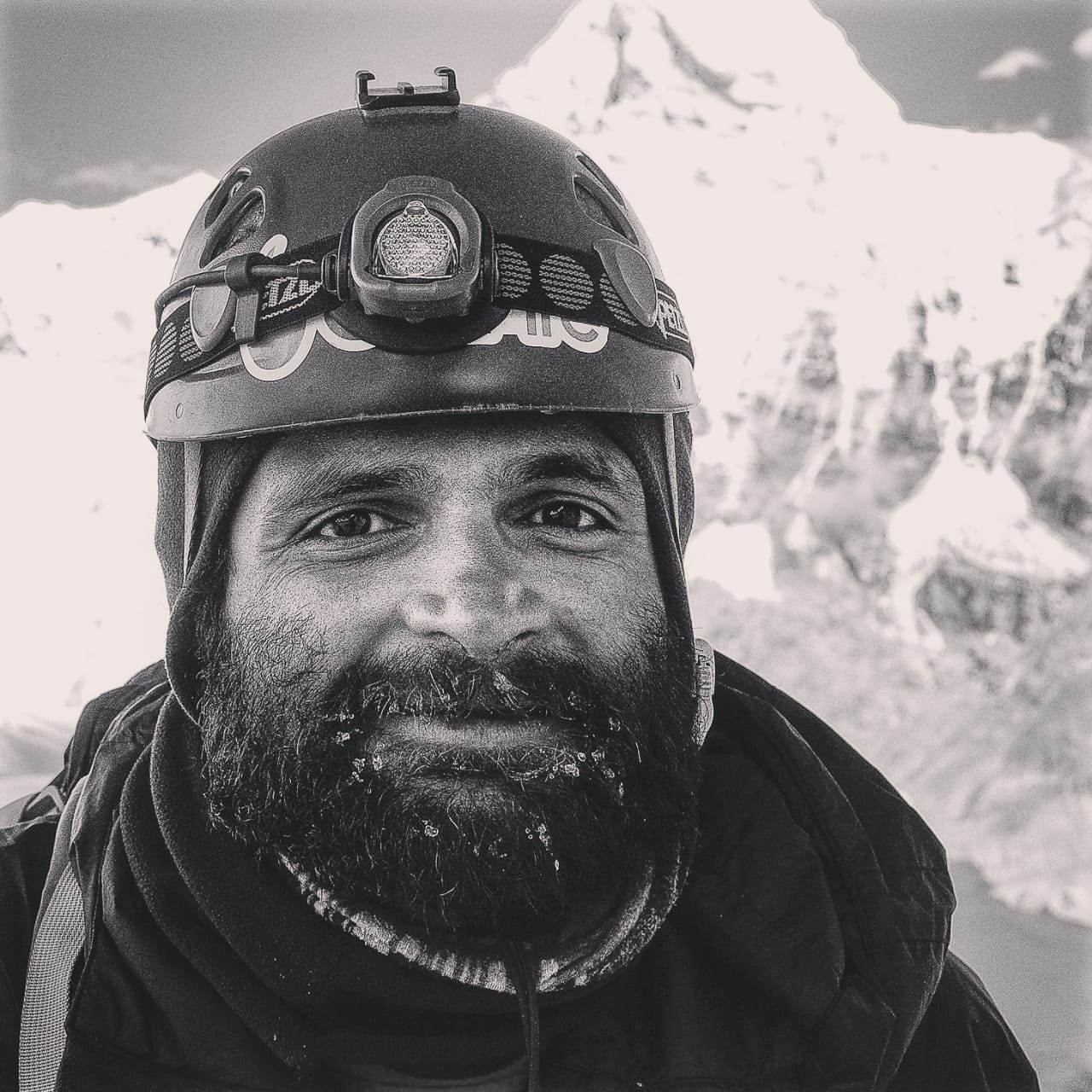

Personal information
- Full name: Kuntal Joisher
- Nationality: Indian
- Born: 26 February 1980 (age 46) Kharagpur, West Bengal, India
- Spouse: Dipti Joisher

Climbing career
- Major ascents: Mt. Everest, Mt. Lhotse, Mt. Manaslu, Mt. Denali

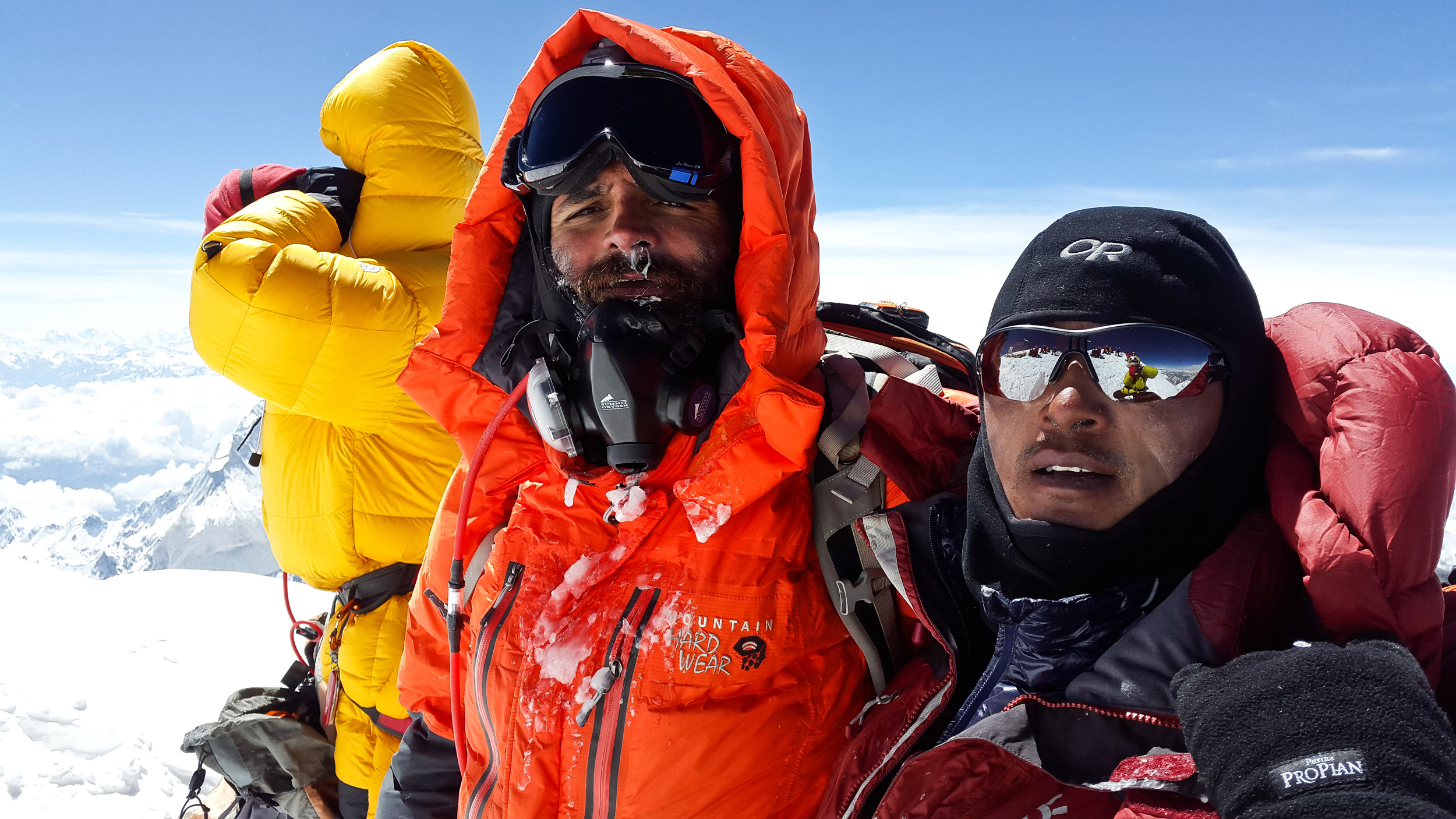
Kuntal Joisher, and Mingma Tenji Sherpa on summit of Mt. Everest on 19 May 2016

Kuntal Joisher (born 26 February 1980) is an Indian mountaineer based in Mumbai. On 15 May 2018, he stood on top of Mt. Lhotse, the 4th highest mountain in the world at 8516 meters. During the course of the expedition, Joisher only consumed strictly vegan food, and used only vegan gear including a one-piece synthetic suit made completely from animal-free material, as well as mittens and gloves constructed devoid of down or leather.

He climbed Mount Everest from the south side on a completely plant-based diet. He reached the summit on 19 May 2016. He is also the first mountaineer to have climbed Mt. Manaslu, the eighth highest mountain in the world, on a completely plant-based diet. He reached the summit on 1 October 2014.

Joisher first went to Nepal in 1984 as a child and returned to Nepal several times for photography and climbing and says he regards Nepal as his "second home". Surviving an almost fatal avalanche during the April 2015 Nepal earthquake, Joisher arranged a photo exhibition after his return and donated income he made from it to relief measures in Nepal. He says regarding his expedition, "it was important for me to send a message across the world that vegans can do it. I wanted to debunk every single myth around veganism." He reached the summit of Denali in June 2022.

== Early life ==
Kuntal was born in India to a Gujarati (Bhanushali) family. He was raised as a vegetarian, and later turned vegan in 2002. He is an alumnus of USC Viterbi, where he did his masters in Computer Science.

== 2014 Everest attempt ==
In 2014, Joisher survived a failed attempt during which 16 Sherpa climbing guides died in the Khumbu Icefall section. The accident was the largest accident in the Everest climbing history. In October 2014, Joisher became the first vegan and the second Indian civilian to summit Manaslu at 8163 m, the eighth highest mountain in the world. A few months before his first Everest attempt, Joisher was called a "fitness star" in a Times of India article.

== 2015 Everest attempt ==
In an interview about his 2015 attempt, Joisher declared that his motivation to climb Everest was to disprove the notion that a vegan diet is nutritionally deficient, and wanted to use clothing and equipment not made from animal products. This attempt also saw Joisher reach for crowd funding; he offered to give away his Everest summit ice-axe to anyone who donated over Rs. 100,000. His attempt to be the first vegan to summit from the south side failed due to an avalanche that was caused by the 2015 Nepal earthquake, which resulted in 21 deaths. A video of the incident that featured Joisher went viral on YouTube receiving over 23 million hits. Joisher trekked with his fellow survivors for 3–4 days from EBC to Lukla from where they were transported to Kathmandu by IAF helicopter. They then volunteered to assist relief work for the earthquake hit as they awaited the arrival of their gear. Joisher kneaded dough and cut vegetables for a kitchen that served puri bhaji. Joisher told NDTV "I'm certain I'll be back again next year".

== 2016 Everest successful summit ==
Joisher's 45-day Everest expedition culminated in his climbing the summit on 19 May 2016.

== See also ==
- Indian summiters of Mount Everest - Year wise
- List of Mount Everest summiters by number of times to the summit
- List of Mount Everest records of India
- List of Mount Everest records
