= American Murder: The Family Next Door =

2020 true-crime documentary film

- Promotional poster
- Directed by: Jenny Popplewell
- Produced by: James Marsh
- Edited by: Simon Barker
- Music by: Nainita Desai
- Production company: Knickerbockerglory
- Distributed by: Netflix
- Release date: September 30, 2020
- Running time: 82 minutes
- Country: United States
- Language: English

American Murder: The Family Next Door is an American true crime documentary film directed by Jenny Popplewell.

== Summary ==
The film tells the story of the 2018 Watts family murders, which took place in Frederick, Colorado. It uses archival footage including social media posts, law enforcement recordings, text messages and home video footage to depict the events that occurred. The film plays out in a found-footage mystery structure, not revealing until the middle that Chris Watts killed his family; his interviews are interspersed with interviews and quotations from friends and family, Chris's shocked mistress who had believed that Chris and Shanann were separated, and text messages copied from Shanann's cell phone, in which she confided in a friend that Chris had not had sex with her for five weeks straight.

The film also explores various public theories behind why Chris committed the murders. Shanann, who was prolific on social media and constantly recorded her children in cell phone videos, was said by two featured radio hosts to be a "narcissist" and a "bitch" obsessed with her phone. This is contradicted by the Rzucek Family, i.e. Shanann's parents and brother, who complain that the public has repeatedly bullied and defamed them using digital technology to spread rumours since the murders. Chris Watts, for his part, does not indicate that Shanann's constant cell phone usage bothered him, instead suggesting that Shanann was physically abusive. The film later reveals that this was a false allegation, and by the ending scene, pastes together the events leading up to the murders with no solid answer as to what Chris's motive was. It is revealed that Chris buried Shannan in a shallow grave at his workplace (an oil field), and that after killing both of his daughters, he stuffed their bodies into twenty-foot-high oil tanks on the property.

== Release ==
The documentary was released on Netflix on September 30, 2020. During the first month of release, Netflix reported that 52 million households had started the documentary. That made American Murder: The Family Next Door the most viewed feature documentary on Netflix on that moment.

== Reception ==
On review aggregator Rotten Tomatoes, the film has an approval rate of 86% based on reviews by 21 critics. The site's critical consensus reads, "American Murder: The Family Next Door chillingly unravels a brutal true crime story using the near-constant connectedness of the digital era." In the New York Times, Bilal Qureshi reviewed the movie positively writing, "Popplewell’s film presents the Watts story as more than a crime story. It is a thematic film about marriage and the deception of social media, as well as a piercing examination of domestic violence constructed with care and undeniable craft."
