= Plainsman (South Africa) =

Newspaper

The Plainsman is a local newspaper in the Mitchell's Plain region of Cape Town, Western Cape, South Africa.
