= Kili Pemba Sherpa =

Nepalese mountaineer (1980–2026)

- Born: 1980; Beding, Nepal
- Died: 30 July 2026 (aged 45–46); Broad Peak, Pakistan
- Cause of death: 2026 Broad Peak avalanche
- Citizenship: Nepal
- Occupation: Mountaineer
- Known for: The first winter ascent of K2 in January 2021

Kili Pemba Sherpa (Nepali: किली पेम्बा शेर्पा; 1980 – 30 July 2026), also known as Kilu Pemba Sherpa, was a Nepalese mountaineer. He was part of the first winter ascent of K2 in January 2021.

Kili Pemba completed the feat of scaling the world's 14 highest mountains known as the '8000ers'. He also scaled Mount Everest 15 times and K2 twice. Kili Pemba was killed in the 2026 Broad Peak avalanche.

== Early life ==
Kili Pemba Sherpa was born in Beding village of the Rolwaling valley in Nepal. He began work as a high-altitude porter at the age of 16.

== Climbing career ==
Kili Pemba Sherpa summited Manaslu, his first 8,000m mountain, in 2002 whilst he was 22 years old. On 22 May 2003 he summited Everest for the first time, a mountain he would later climb fourteen more times.

During May 2018, Kili Pemba guided double leg amputee Xia Boyu to the summit of Everest, a climber who had lost both legs whilst attempting to climb Everest decades earlier. He later guided another double leg amputee to the summit of Manaslu.

On 16 January 2021, Kili Pemba, alongside nine other Nepalese mountaineers, including Nirmal Purja and Mingma Gyalje, achieved the historic first winter ascent of K2. This feat was regarded as "one of the last great remaining challenges of mountaineering" because K2 was the last 8,000m mountain to have not been climbed successfully during the winter season despite dozens of previous attempts.

On 3 July 2026, Kili Pemba summited Nanga Parbat to complete the feat of climbing all 14 mountains above 8,000m.

== Death ==
On 30 July 2026, Kili Pemba Sherpa was killed by an avalanche on Broad Peak in the Karakorum range of Pakistan. He was one of ten climbers to have died in the 2026 Broad Peak avalanche which made it the deadliest day in Broad Peak's history.
