= Nirmal Purja =

Nepali-British mountaineer (1983–2026)

Nirmal Purja MBE
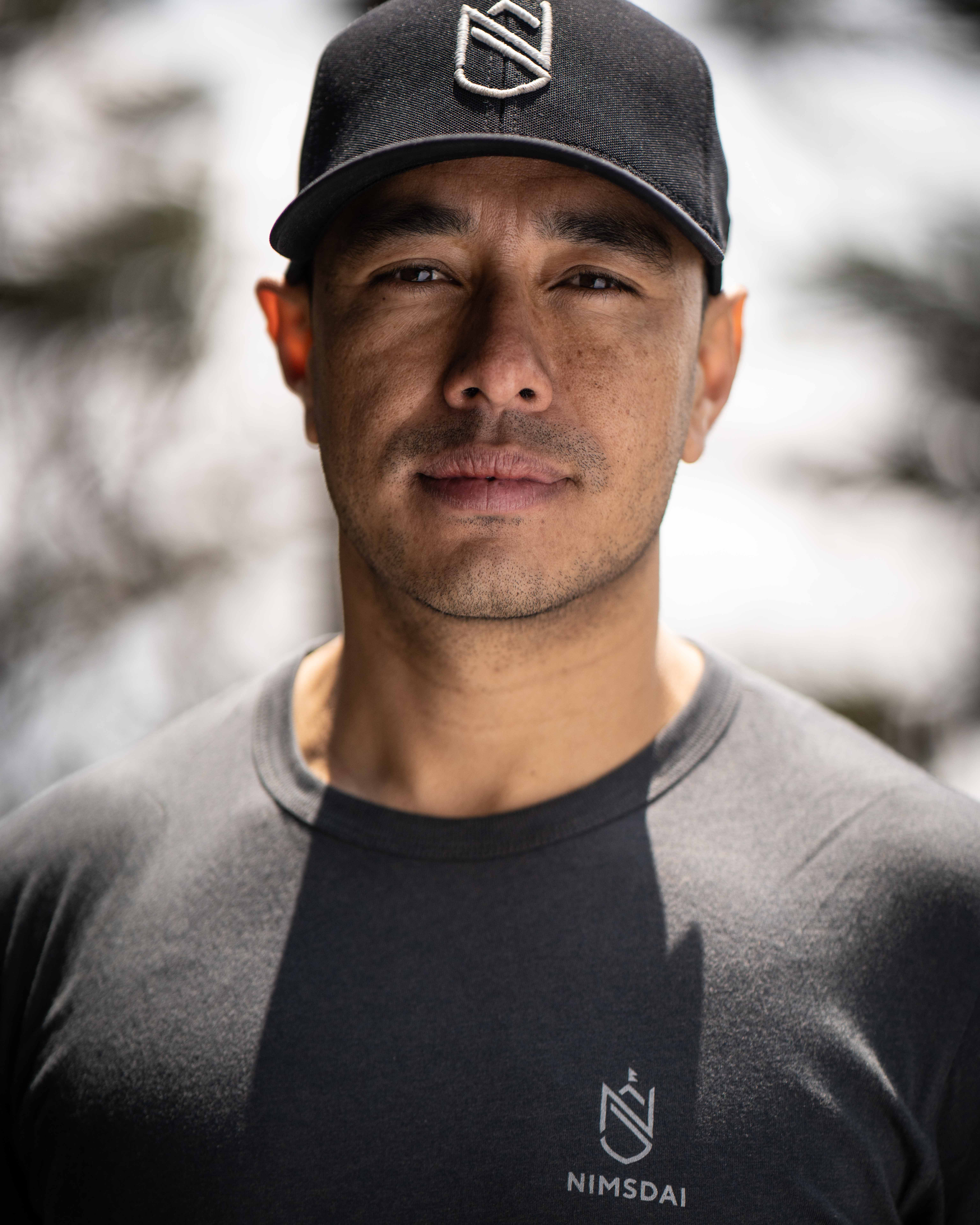
- Purja in 2021

Personal information
- Citizenship: Nepal (NRN); United Kingdom
- Born: 25 July 1983 Dana, Myagdi, Nepal
- Died: 30 July 2026 (aged 43) Broad Peak, Gilgit-Baltistan, Pakistan
- Spouse: Suchi Purja
- Children: 1
- Relatives: Tejan Gurung (brother-in-law)

Climbing career
- Major ascents: Fastest ascent of all fourteen eight-thousander mountains with supplementary oxygen, in six months and six days (record until 2023); Fastest ascent of all fourteen eight-thousanders without supplementary oxygen, in 2 years and 150 days; Fastest ascent of Mount Everest, Lhotse and Makalu, in 48 hours; First winter ascent of K2

Nirmal Purja (Nepali: निर्मल पुर्जा; 25 July 1983 – 30 July 2026), also known as Nims or Nimsdai, was a Nepali-British mountaineer. Before pursuing a career in mountaineering, he served in the British Army with the Brigade of Gurkhas and later in the Special Boat Service (SBS), the special forces unit of the Royal Navy.

Purja climbed all 14 eight-thousanders – peaks above 8,000 metres or 26,000 feet – in a then-record time of six months and six days with the aid of bottled oxygen between April and October 2019; the record stood until broken in 2023 by Kristin Harila and Tenjen Sherpa. Purja continues to hold the record for the fastest ascent of all eight-thousanders without supplementary oxygen at two years and 150 days. Purja was the first person to reach the summits of Mount Everest, Lhotse, and Makalu within 48 hours. In 2021, he and a team of nine other Nepalese climbers completed the first winter ascent of K2. Considered one of the most accomplished climbers of his generation, Purja is widely regarded as a major figure in modern high-altitude mountaineering.

In July 2026, Purja and nine other climbers died in an avalanche on the Pakistani side of Broad Peak.

== Early life ==
Nirmal ("Nims") Purja was born on 25 July 1983 in Dana, a small village in Nepal's Myagdi District, near Mount Dhaulagiri. He was the youngest of five children born to Nanda Bahadur Purja and Purna Kumari. His father served as a Gurkha soldier in the Indian Army, while his mother came from a farming background. Their inter-caste marriage was frowned upon because they came from different ethnic backgrounds, leaving both financially and socially cut off from their respective families. In an interview with National Geographic, Purja recalled coming from a very poor background, saying, "As a kid, I remember I didn't even have flip-flops."

When Purja was four years old, his family moved to southern lowlands of Nepal, known as the Terai, and settled in Chitwan District. In a later interview with The Icons by Motiversity, he recalled, "I grew up in the most flat and most warmest part of Nepal," emphasizing that having been raised in the lowlands rather than mountains meant anyone could achieve their goals regardless of their background.

Purja has three older brothers and one sister. Following their father's footsteps, all four sons, served as Gurkha soldiers in the Brigade of Gurkhas within the British Army. His three older brothers helped fund his education at an English-speaking boarding school. During his school years, he also became proficient in kickboxing. He later attended Loughborough University in England, where he received a postgraduate diploma in security management.

== Military career ==
Purja joined the Brigade of Gurkhas in 2003 and was accepted into the Royal Navy's Special Boat Service (SBS) in 2009, becoming the first Gurkha to join the elite British unit. He served in the SBS as a cold-weather warfare specialist. Purja said that he was involved in all theatres of war in which Britain was engaged and that he was wounded when a sniper bullet struck the butt of his rifle, narrowly missing his neck.

In 2018 he resigned from the SBS to focus full-time on high-altitude mountaineering. He had become an important contributor to his family while serving in the military and he was giving up his army pension, which he described as "a life-changing" amount of money.

== Climbing career ==
=== Early Himalayan ascents ===
Purja made his first major Himalayan climb in 2012, reaching the summit of Lobuche East with no previous mountaineering experience. On 18 May 2014, he made his first ascent of an eight-thousander by summiting Dhaulagiri (8,167 metres) during a return trip of only 15 days. On 13 May 2016, he summited Mount Everest, his second eight-thousander.

On 15 May 2017, Purja led the Gurkha Expedition "G200E", which summited Everest with 13 Gurkhas to commemorate 200 years of Gurkha service in the British Army. He climbed Mount Everest nine times: the third time on 27 May 2017, the fourth on 22 May 2019, the fifth on 31 May 2021, the sixth on 15 May 2022, the seventh 13 days later on 28 May 2022, the eighth on 17 May 2023, and the ninth on 27 May 2026.

=== Project Possible 14/7 ===
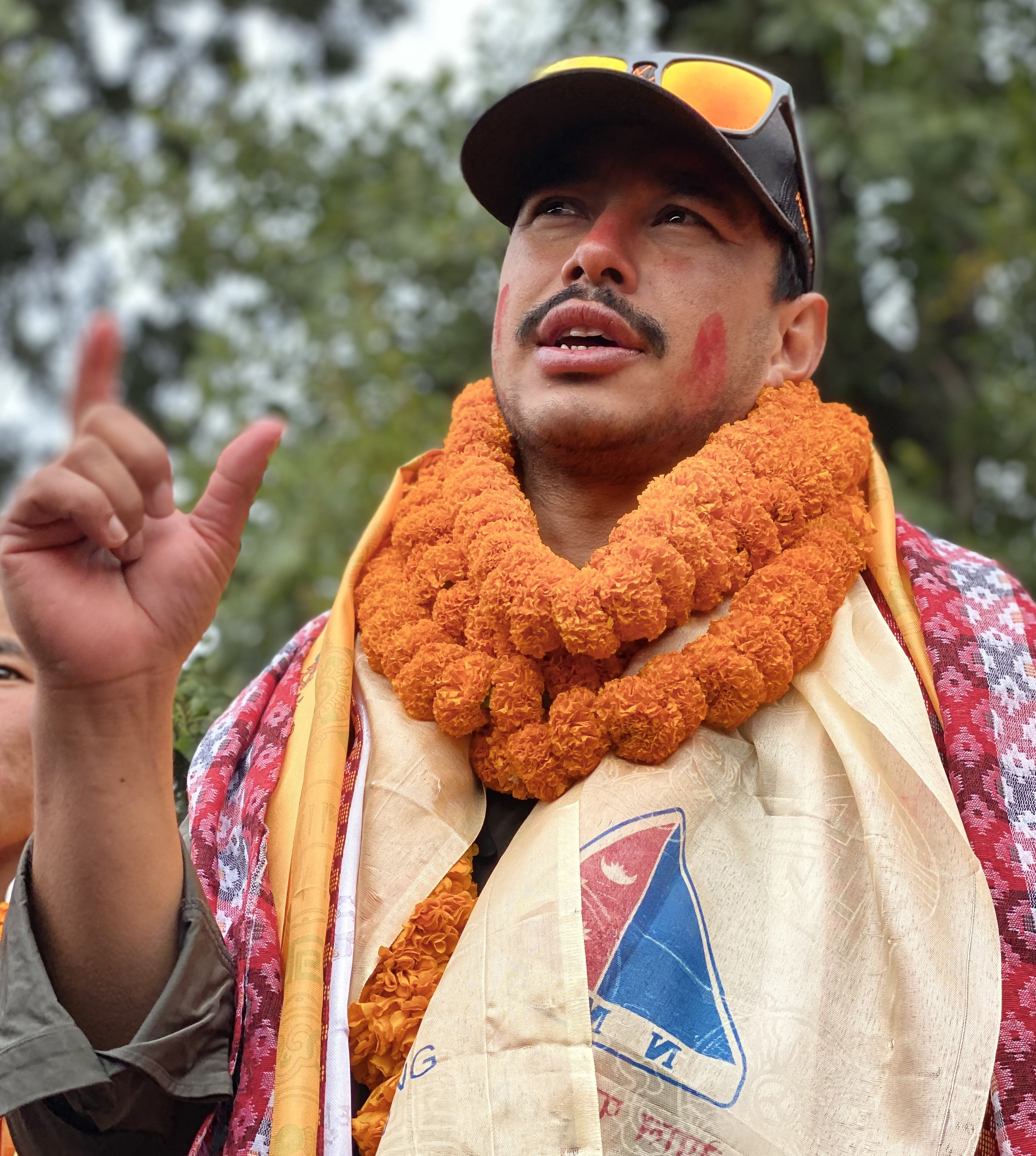
Purja in Kathmandu in 2019, after the final climb of Project Possible

With a plan to complete all 14 eight-thousanders in seven months, Purja summited the first mountain on 23 April 2019 and completed the first six-summit phase of his "Project Possible 14/7" on 24 May 2019: Annapurna, Dhaulagiri, Kangchenjunga, Mount Everest, Lhotse, and Makalu. He climbed with Sherpas Mingma Gyabu "David" Sherpa, Lakpa Dendi (Zekson Son), Geljen Sherpa and Tensi Kasang, among other mountaineers. The last five summits were climbed in only 12 days. He broke his previous Guinness World Record by climbing Everest, Lhotse, and Makalu within 2 days and 30 minutes.

Purja completed the second phase in July 2019, climbing Nanga Parbat (8126 m, 3 July), Gasherbrum I (8080 m, 15 July), Gasherbrum II (8034 m, 18 July), K2 (8611 metres, 24 July) and Broad Peak (8047 m, 26 July), all in Pakistan.

The third and final phase began in September 2019. He summitted Cho Oyu (8188 m, Tibet) on 23 September and Manaslu (8163 m, Nepal) on 27 September. On 1 October 2019, Chinese authorities granted Purja and his team a special permit to climb Shishapangma (8027 m, Tibet, China) in the autumn season, at the request of the Nepali government. Purja left Nepal for Tibet on 18 October 2019, leading a five-member expedition, and completed Project Possible 14/7 with a successful summit on 29 October using supplemental oxygen.

Research published in 2022 noted that during Project 14/7, Purja had stopped at the rocky fore summit of Dhaulagiri and at the ridge point on Manaslu.

In addition to the fastest ascent of the 14 tallest mountains with supplemental oxygen, Purja broke several further records: most 8,000 m mountains climbed in the spring season (six); most 8,000 m in the summer season (five); fastest summit of the three highest mountains in the world, (Everest, K2 and Kangchenjunga; fastest summit of the five highest mountains in the World, Everest, K2, Kangchenjunga, Lhotse and Makalu); fastest lower 8000ers, (Gasherbrum I, II, and Broad Peak); and fastest higher 8,000ers, with consecutive summits of Everest, Lhotse and Makalu in 48 hours (beats his own previous record of five days).

During Project Possible in May 2019, a photo taken by Purja of overcrowding on Everest went viral and was published in The New York Times.

Project Possible was documented in the Netflix film 14 Peaks: Nothing Is Impossible, released on 29 November 2021.

=== First winter ascent of K2 ===
Purja, along with nine other Nepali mountaineers, made history on 16 January 2021 as the first to climb K2 in winter. His team – Mingma David Sherpa, Mingma Tenzi Sherpa, Geljen Sherpa, Pem Chiri Sherpa, Dawa Temba Sherpa, and himself – joined the team of Mingma Gyalje Sherpa (Mingma G), Dawa Tenjin Sherpa and Kilu Pemba Sherpa, and Sona Sherpa from Seven Summits Treks. They successfully summited K2 at 16:58 local time in Pakistan. This was the first successful K2 winter ascent after numerous attempts since 1987. Purja was the only team member to reach the summit without supplemental oxygen, becoming the first person to do so in winter.

After severe weather conditions hit the lower camps at the foot of K2 and some equipment was lost, Nepali mountaineers from the three teams decided to join efforts and climb the peak together. But they did not. Purja and his team agreed to summit together with another team so that Purja's team could use the other team's ropes. However, Purja then summited with his team, using the other team's ropes, earlier than agreed, leading him to summit first. Some persons in mountaineering questioned Purja's ethics.

=== Further achievements ===
In May 2022, Purja set a new speed record for ascending Kangchenjunga, Mount Everest, and Lhotse consecutively without supplemental oxygen, with a time of 8 days 23 hours, and 10 minutes. He ascended Kangchenjunga on 7 May at 10:50 am, Everest on 15 May at 8 am (his sixth ascent of Everest), and, after 26 hours, ascended Lhotse on 16 May at 10 am.

On 4 October 2024, Purja broke two world records after summiting Shishapangma: the fastest time to summit all 14 peaks without supplemental oxygen (2 years and 5 months), and the fastest to summit all 14 peaks both with and without supplemental oxygen.

On 21 October 2024, he became the first person to summit the 14 peaks and the Seven Summits both with and without supplemental oxygen.

In 2025, Purja announced his latest challenge, the Hat-Trick Challenge, aiming to complete the 14 Peaks and the Seven Summits for the third time. He said he would self‑fund the project, with all donations and sponsorship money supporting the Nimsdai Foundation. The Foundation's mission is to support Big Mountain communities through initiatives including education, emergency aid, and environmental projects. Its most high‑profile project is the Big Mountain Clean Up, launched to remove waste from the high peaks.

On 3 July 2025, Purja announced that he had summitted Nanga Parbat in Pakistan. This was his 50th successful ascent of an 8,000m peak and his 22nd without supplemental oxygen. These ascents set two new records: the most successful summits by any climber and the most successful summits without supplemental oxygen.

In May 2026, Purja broke his own world record for the fastest traverse of Everest and Lhotse without supplemental oxygen. He climbed from the summit of Everest to the summit of Lhotse in 13 hours, beating his previous record of 25 hours. A few days later, he summitted Makalu, marking his 56th ascent of an 8,000 m peak and further increasing his record for the highest number of 8,000 m summits.

=== Ascents of eight-thousanders ===
Research published in 2022 could only verify three climbers – Purja, Ed Viesturs, and Veikka Gustafsson – as having stood on the true geographical summit of all 14 eight‑thousanders. The researchers noted that during Project 14/7, Purja had stopped at the rocky fore summit of Dhaulagiri and at the ridge point on Manaslu. They also noted that he corrected this in autumn 2021 when he reached the true summits of both mountains.

The following table lists all of Purja's ascents of eight‑thousander peaks:

S.no.	Eight-thousander peak (height)	Date of ascent
1.	Mount Everest (8848 m)	13 May 2016, 15 May 2017, 27 May 2017, 22 May 2019, 31 May 2021, 15 May 2022, 28 May 2022, 17 May 2023, 27 May 2026
2.	K2 (8611 m)	24 July 2019, 16 January 2021, 22 July 2022
3.	Kangchenjunga (8586 m)	15 May 2019, 7 May 2022, 18 May 2025
4.	Lhotse (8516 m)	27 May 2017, 22 May 2019, 16 May 2022, 28 May 2022, May 2023, 27 May 2026
5.	Makalu (8485 m)	1 June 2017, 24 May 2019, 5 June 2023
6.	Cho Oyu (8188 m)	23 September 2019, 2 October 2023
7.	Dhaulagiri (8167 m)	18 May 2014, 12 May 2019, 8 October 2021
8.	Manaslu (8163 m)	27 September 2019, 27 September 2021, 25 September 2025
9.	Nanga Parbat (8125 m)	3 July 2019, 2 July 2023, 3 July 2025
10.	Annapurna (8091 m)	23 April 2019, April 2023, 15 April 2024
11.	Gasherbrum I (8080 m)	15 July 2019, 21 July 2023, July 2025
12.	Broad Peak (8051 m)	26 July 2019, 25 July 2023, July 2025
13.	Gasherbrum II (8034 m)	18 July 2019, 17 July 2023, 21 July 2026
14.	Shishapangma (8027 m)	29 October 2019, 4 October 2024, 9 October 2024

== Personal life ==
Nirmal Purja was widely known as Nimsdai, with dai meaning "elder brother" in Nepali. Purja was of Magar descent and was raised Hindu. His family had longstanding ties to the Brigade of Gurkhas. His father served in the Gorkha Regiment of the Indian Army, while three of his older brothers served as Gurkha soldiers. His mother came from a farming background. Purja described becoming a Gurkha as his principal childhood ambition, following the example set by his father and brothers.

In 2006, he married Suchi Purja, the daughter of a Gurkha soldier, who worked in dentistry. The couple settled in Eastleigh, near Southampton, and had one daughter. Suchi appeared alongside her husband in connection with his mountaineering career, including in the documentary 14 Peaks: Nothing Is Impossible, which portrayed the effect that his expeditions and ambitions had on their family life.

Purja's decision to leave the Special Boat Service and pursue mountaineering full-time involved substantial personal and financial risks. By leaving the military in 2018, he gave up the prospect of receiving a full military pension, which he described as a life-changing amount of money. After struggling to obtain sufficient sponsorship for Project Possible, he remortgaged the family home to help finance the expedition.

Purja later said that when he flew from Heathrow to Kathmandu to begin the project, he had secured only about 15 per cent of the total funding required. He described the year preceding the expedition as being dominated by fundraising attempts rather than physical preparation and said that repeatedly being rejected by potential sponsors caused considerable stress.

The documentary 14 Peaks also depicted tensions within his family during Project Possible. His wife was concerned about the dangers he faced, his mother was experiencing serious health problems, and one of his older brothers opposed his decision to leave a secure military career to pursue the project. The Guardian described these circumstances, together with the pressure of sponsorship commitments and the second mortgage on his home, as an important part of the personal struggle behind the expedition.

While serving in the armed forces, Purja studied at Loughborough University, obtaining a postgraduate diploma in security management. In December 2023, the university awarded him an honorary doctorate in recognition of his military service and mountaineering achievements.

== Controversies ==
=== Sexual misconduct allegations ===
In May 2024, The New York Times reported on allegations of sexual misconduct against Purja levied by Finnish mountaineer Lotta Hintsa and Californian physician April Leonardo. In her December 2023 memoir, Elämäni Vuoret 2 ("The Mountains of My Life"), Hintsa briefly described “an upsetting incident” during which an unnamed "very famous male climber…. kissed [her] completely without warning" during a business discussion in Kathmandu, Nepal. Later, in an interview with The New York Times, she confirmed that “her experience was more disturbing than she had described in the book,” revealing that Purja had led her to the bedroom in his hotel suite, attempted to remove her clothes, touched her inappropriately, and masturbated next to her despite her repeated objections. In a separate incident that occurred in 2022, Leonardo alleged that Purja “showed up at her tent uninvited” and attempted to initiate sex with her several times after. Since the incidents took place outside their home countries, both Hintsa and Leonardo “felt powerless” and did not contact the law enforcement about their experience.

Purja “unequivocally denied allegations of wrongdoing” through his lawyer, and described the accounts as “defamatory and false.” In another statement, he announced that his team will be initiating legal proceedings against The New York Times.

In light of the allegations, Osprey Packs withdrew as Purja’s sponsors. Grivel and Scarpa suspended their marketing and promotional activities featuring the mountaineer.

=== The Himalayan Times blacklisting ===
In 2025, the Nepal Press Council blacklisted The Himalayan Times and removed its government-funded advertising following an investigation into "imbalanced" articles about Purja and his companies, Skydive Nimsdai and Elite Exped.

Across 2024, The Himalayan Times published 17 articles alleging wrongdoing by Purja and his businesses. In response, Purja and his companies filed a complaint with the Nepal Press Council, prompting an investigation.

On 20 February 2025, the Council ruled that the publication had breached the Journalistic Code of Conduct, stating that the articles were "unilateral and imbalanced, aimed at creating hatred and discrimination, and potentially causing damage to individuals." As a result, the council blacklisted The Himalayan Times and withdrew government-funded advertising.

On 12 March 2025, The Himalayan Times responded, alleging that the Nepal Press Council "has made an arbitrary decision to take 'unconstitutional action'" against them.

== Death ==
On 30 July 2026, Purja died while climbing Broad Peak in Pakistan's Karakoram range. His team of ten climbers – including American Mallory Geis, Chinese Wang Zhong, Nepali Pur Bahadur Gurung, Pakistani Sohail Sakhi and Omani Nadhira Al Harthy – was hit by an avalanche at 9 am local time at around 6,600 m, between camps 2 and 3 on the west ridge of the mountain. Purja's climbing company confirmed the death of all team members on 1 August. Purja's body was found on 2 August by a Nepali-Pakistani rescue team at around 5,700 m; the Alpine Club of Pakistan announced the recovery of his remains on 5 August.

=== Tributes ===
William, Prince of Wales, described Purja as "one of the world's greatest mountaineers", and said his thoughts were with his family and the families of the others killed. Bear Grylls also paid tribute, describing Purja as a "remarkable and unique man" and referring to his "unstoppable spirit". Nepal's Prime Minister Balen Shah said the history of the climber's courage and dedication "will always remain inspiring".

== Honours ==
- In 2018, Purja was appointed a Member of the Order of the British Empire (MBE) by Queen Elizabeth II for outstanding achievement in extreme high-altitude mountaineering.
- In November 2023, he received the ISPO Cup Award in Düsseldorf, Germany, in recognition of his mountaineering career and charitable work through the Nimsdai Foundation.
- In December 2023, he received an honorary degree from Loughborough University for his military service and achievements as a mountaineer.
- In August 2026, the newly discovered Himalayan flowering plant, Impatiens nimspurjae, was named after Purja. The plant is native to Myagdi District of Nepal, where he was born. The plant was named after Purja in recognition of his mountaineering career and his contributions to environmental advocacy. Through initiatives such as the Big Mountain Cleanup, Purja worked to remove abandoned expedition waste from high-altitude environments.

== Filmography ==
Year	Title	Role	Notes	Ref(s)
2021	14 Peaks: Nothing Is Impossible	Himself		

== Books ==
- Purja, Nirmal (12 November 2020). Beyond Possible. Hodder & Stoughton. ISBN 978-1-5293-1226-3.

== See also ==
- 2026 Broad Peak avalanche, which claimed the lives of 10 climbers; including Nirmal Purja
- Death zone, the area above 8,000 metres of altitude
- Kim Chang-ho (climber), a previous holder of the speed record for all 14 eight-thousanders
- List of climbers and mountaineers
- Kristin Harila and Tenjen Sherpa, new holders of the speed record for all 14 eight-thousanders
