= Mingma Gyabu Sherpa =

Nepalese mountaineer

Honourable Mingma Gyabu Sherpa
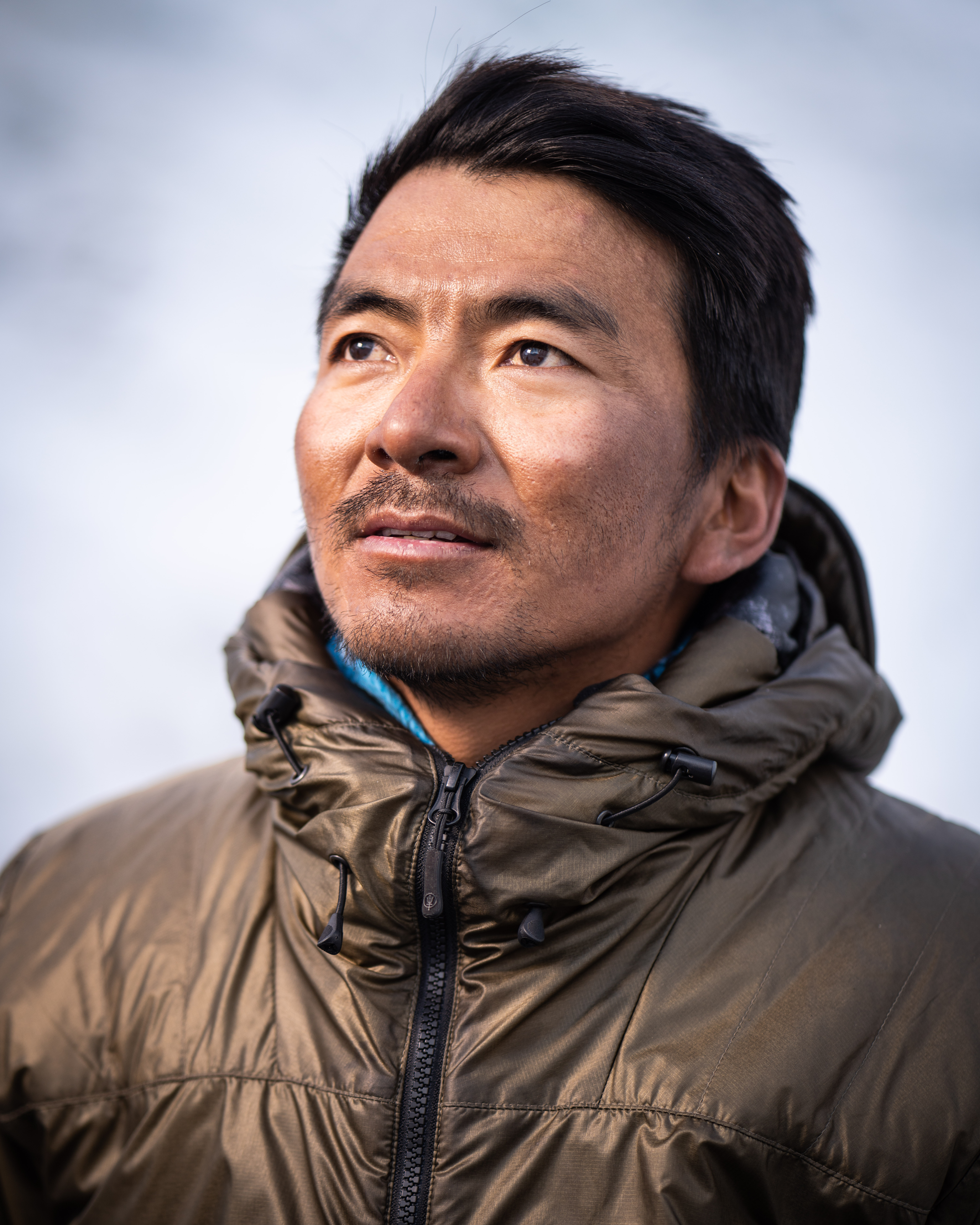
- Mingma Gyabu Sherpa

Member of the House of Representatives (PR)
- Incumbent
- Assumed office 26 March 2026
- Constituency: Party List (Rastriya Swatantra Party)

Personal details
- Born: 16 May 1989 (age 37) Taplejung, Nepal
- Known for: Mountaineering

Mingma Gyabu Sherpa (also known as Mingma David, born 16 May 1989) is a Nepalese politician and mountaineer. He was until 2024 the youngest person to climb all 14 eight-thousanders, and holds the Guinness World Record for "Fastest time to climb Everest and K2", which he did within 61 days.

== Mountaineering career ==
Mingma Gyabu Sherpa is the 43rd climber to have made successful ascents of all 14 eight thousanders; he climbed nine of them with Nirmal Purja as a climbing sherpa in 2019.

Mingma Gyabu Sherpa was one of the 10 Nepali mountaineers that made history on 16 January 2021 as the first to ascend K2 in winter. His team consisted of Nirmal Purja, Mingma Tenzi Sherpa, Gelje Sherpa, Pem Chhiri Sherpa and Dawa Temba Sherpa, joined by the Mingma G team consisting Mingma Gyalje Sherpa (Mingma G), Dawa Tenjin Sherpa, and Kili Pemba Sherpa, and joined by Sona Sherpa successfully reached the summit of K2 at 4:58 p.m. local time. After bad weather hit the lower camps at the foot of K2 and some equipment was lost, Nepali mountaineers of those three teams decided to join efforts and climb the peak together, as a team. This was the first successful K2 winter expedition after numerous attempts since 1987.

== Awards ==
The Union of Asian Alpine Association (UAAA) has honoured Sherpa with one of the Piolet d'Or Asia Awards with the title of Sherpa of the year for his commitment to technical climbings and positive environmental stewardship in the mountains in 2019.

== Political career ==
In the 2026 Nepalese general election, Sherpa ran as a candidate for the Janajati proportional representation constituency under the Rastriya Swatantra Party, and was subsequently elected.

== Eight-thousanders climbed ==
S.no.	Peak (height)	Year (season)
1.	Mount Everest (8848).	2010 (spring), 2011, 2012, 2013, 2017, 2018 (spring), 2021 (spring)
2.	K2 (8611 m).	2014 (summer), 2018 (summer), 2021 (winter), 2022 (summer, twice), 2023 (summer)
3.	Kangchenjunga (8586 m).	2019 (spring)
4.	Lhotse (8516 m).	2018 (spring)
5.	Makalu (8485 m).	2014 (spring)
6.	Cho Oyu (8188 m).	2011 (autumn)
7.	Dhaulagiri (8167 m).	2019 (spring)
8.	Manaslu (8163 m).	2012 (autumn), 2015 (autumn), 2018 (autumn), 2019 (autumn)
9.	Nanga Parbat (8125 m).	2019 (summer)
10.	Annapurna (8091 m).	2019 (spring)
11.	Gasherbrum I (8080 m).	2019 (summer)
12.	Broad Peak (8051 m).	2019 (summer)
13.	Gasherbrum II (8034 m).	2019 (summer)
14.	Shishapangma (8027 m).	2019 (autumn)

== See also ==
- 14 Peaks: Nothing Is Impossible, 2021 film that includes Mingma Gyabu Sherpa
