= Dana, Nepal =

Dana दाना
- Village development committee
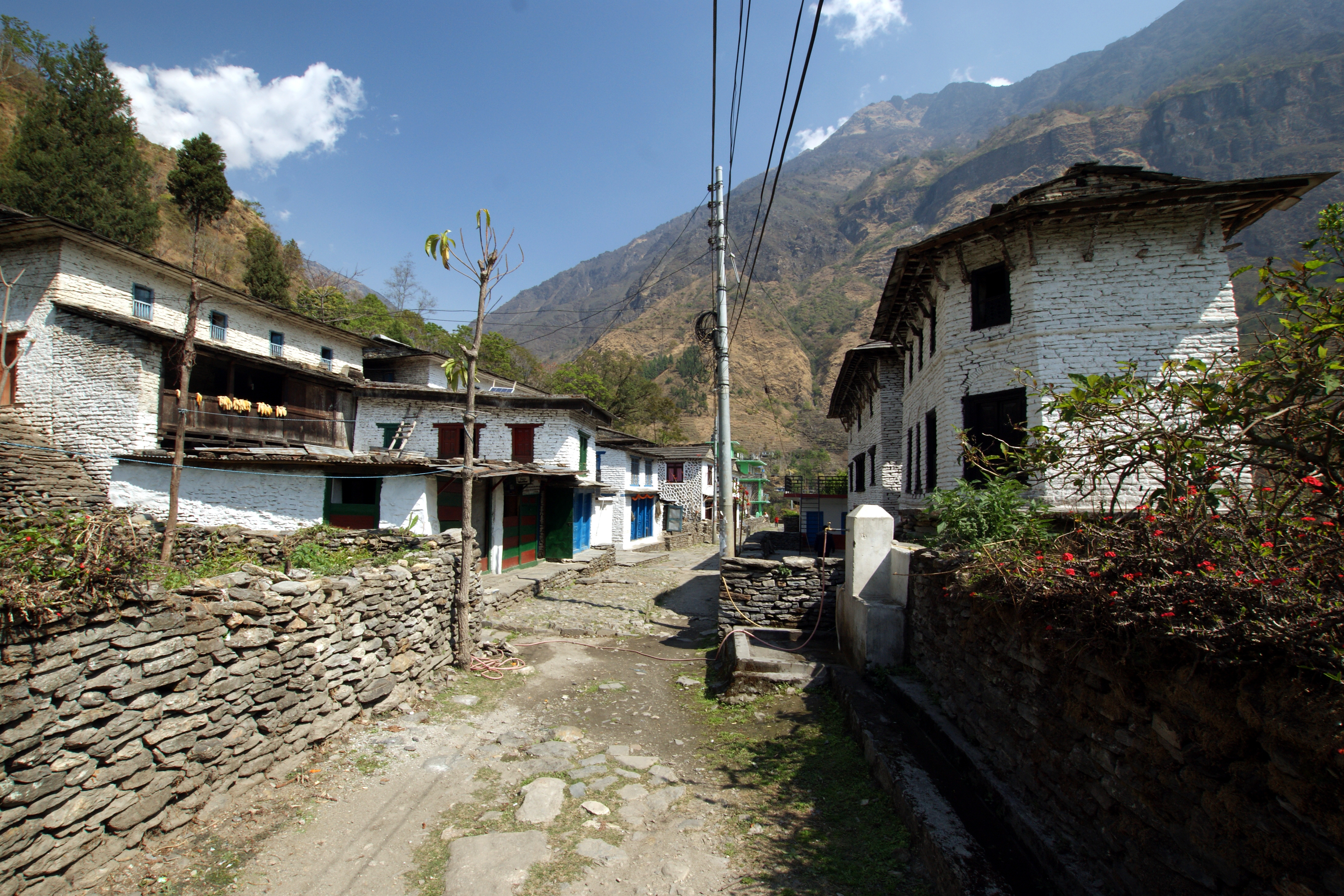
- Dana village

- Location in Nepal Dana (Nepal)
- Coordinates: 28.54°N 83.62°E
- Country: Nepal
- Zone: Dhaulagiri Zone
- District: Myagdi District

Population (1991)
  - Total: 1,787
- Time zone: UTC+5:45 (Nepal Time)

Dana (Nepali: दाना) is a village development committee in Myagdi District in the Dhaulagiri Zone of western-central Nepal. At the time of the 1991 Nepal census it had a population of 1787 people living in 398 individual households.

== Background ==
Dana was a stop along the old salt trading route.

== Notable people ==
- Nirmal Purja
