= 2026 Broad Peak avalanche =

Fatal natural disaster in Pakistan

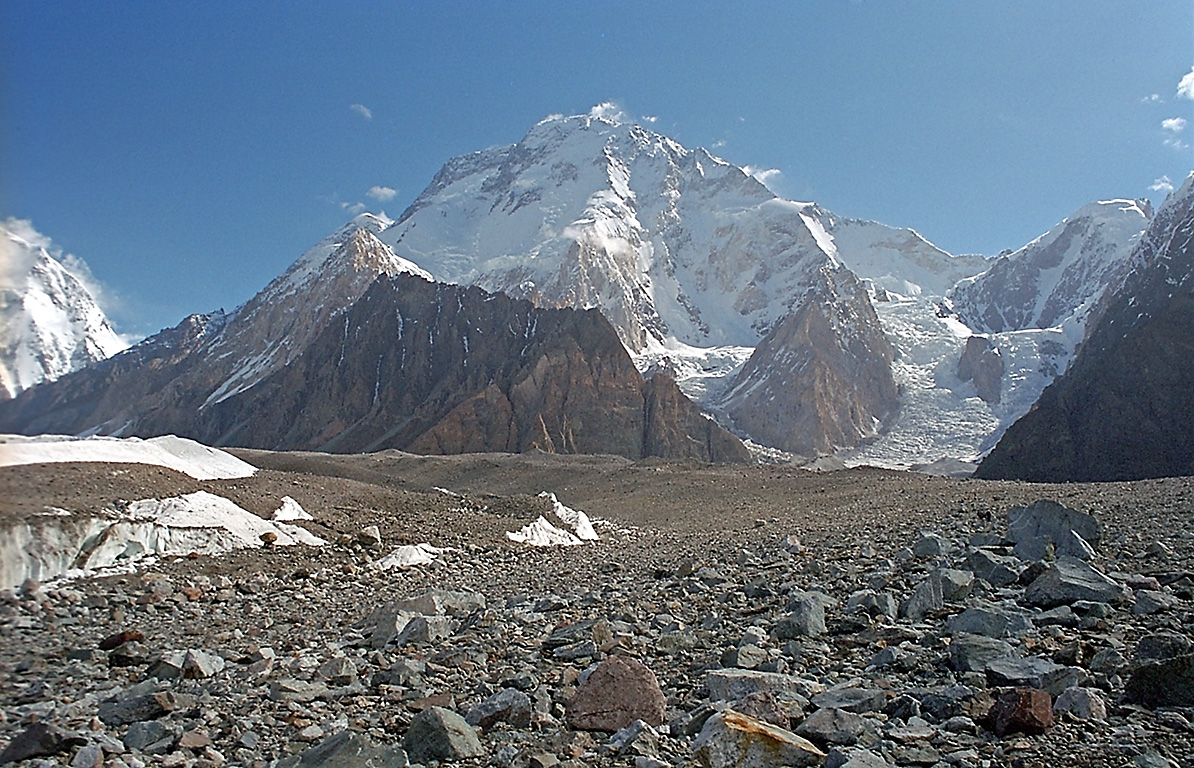
- Broad Peak from Concordia, pictured in 2004
- Date: 30 July 2026
- Location: Broad Peak Elevation 6,660 m (21,850 ft); 35°48′40″N 76°32′56″E
- Type: Avalanche
- Deaths: 10

On 30 July 2026, an avalanche struck a group of 10 climbers attempting to summit Broad Peak in the Karakoram range of Pakistan. The avalanche occurred at an altitude of about 6,600 m (21,700 ft) on the slope between Camp 2 and Camp 3 and swept all the climbers down the mountain.

On 1 August, it was confirmed that all 10 climbers had died. The climbers were Sohail Sakhi, Mallory Geis, Nirmal Purja (Nimsdai), Pur Bahadur Gurung (Yukta), Nima Sherpa, Nadhira Al Harthy, Kili Pemba Sherpa (Kilu), Nawang Thindu Sherpa, Gyalu Sherpa and Wang Zhong.

== Background ==
Broad Peak (8,051 m) is the twelfth-highest mountain in the world, located in Gilgit-Baltistan, Pakistan, close to K2. In the 2026 summer climbing season, several expeditions were attempting to summit the mountain, including Nirmal Purja's EliteExped team. Purja was attempting to become the first person to climb all fourteen eight-thousanders three times, and to climb all fourteen twice without bottled oxygen.

Several of those caught in the July 30 avalanche were experienced Sherpa guides from Nepal. Pur Bahadur Gurung, known as Yukta, an IFMGA-certified guide, was among the guides working for Purja's EliteExped team. Kili "Kilu" Pemba Sherpa, one of the most experienced climbers of the Imagine Nepal team, had been part of the group that completed the first winter ascent of K2 in 2021, led by Purja. Nima Sherpa, Nawang Thindu Sherpa, and Gyalu Sherpa were also among those caught in the avalanche.

Nadhira Al Harthy of Oman, climbing with Seven Summit Treks, had become the first Omani woman to summit Mount Everest in 2019, and had previously summited K2 and Manaslu. Experienced Pakistani climber Sohail Sakhi was guiding American client Sarah Mallory Geis, who was on her first eight-thousander expedition.

Conditions in the days before the avalanche were reportedly unstable. A climber who had left the mountain earlier in the season reported a major windstorm on 18 July and said winds were high and humidity elevated throughout the region, indicating likely fresh snow through 29 July.

== Avalanche ==
At approximately 9:30 a.m. local time on 30 July 2026, an avalanche struck the 10 summit-bound climbers on the section of the mountain between Camp 2 and Camp 3. Their satellite GPS trackers recorded a rapid fall of several hundred meters; some climbers came to rest almost at Base Camp. Purja's tracker showed he fell about 800 m (2,600 ft), while Al Harthy fell almost to the base of the mountain. A call for an aerial rescue was reportedly made only hours after the slide.

== Search and rescue ==
Two helicopters began an aerial search on the morning of 31 July, alongside ground search parties operating from Camp 1. A drone spotted additional bodies, but identification was impossible, and the GPS trackers of several missing climbers showed approximate locations at around 5,800 m (19,000 ft).

The Alpine Club of Pakistan coordinated the rescue effort, and EliteExped, Purja's company, flew additional Nepali climbers to Pakistan to join the search. Most teams on neighbouring K2 aborted their summit pushes to assist in the search.

== Casualties ==
Later that day, the Alpine Club of Pakistan confirmed the identities of two of the deceased climbers: Al Harthy and Gurung. Their bodies were recovered from the base of the avalanche, opposite Broad Peak Base Camp, by a team from the outfitter Karakorum Expeditions. On 31 July, a drone spotted seven bodies, but was unable to confirm their identities. An earlier report of four bodies being found was later revised.

On 1 August, the EliteExped team confirmed the deaths of all the climbers on its social media account.

On 2 August, the Alpine Club of Pakistan announced that a Nepali-Pakistani team had found the bodies of Purja, Zhong, Nima Sherpa, and Kili Pemba Sherpa at around 5,700 m. By 21 August, nine bodies had been recovered; Nawang Thindu Sherpa's remains were in a location that was too difficult to access.

=== Deaths ===
Name(s)	Nationalities
Pur Bahadur Gurung ("Yukta")	Nepal
Kili Pemba Sherpa ("Kilu")	Nepal
Nima Sherpa	Nepal
Nawang Thindu Sherpa	Nepal
Gyalu Sherpa	Nepal
Nirmal Purja ("Nimsdai")	Nepal/United Kingdom
Wang Zhong	China
Nadhira Al Harthy	Oman
Sohail Sakhi	Pakistan
Sarah Mallory Geis	United States

== Reactions ==
The Foreign Ministry of Oman publicly expressed condolences over Al Harthy's death and praised her efforts to strengthen relations between Nepal and Oman.

== See also ==
- List of avalanches by death toll
- List of deaths on eight-thousanders
- List of mountaineering disasters by death toll
