= NaturVision =

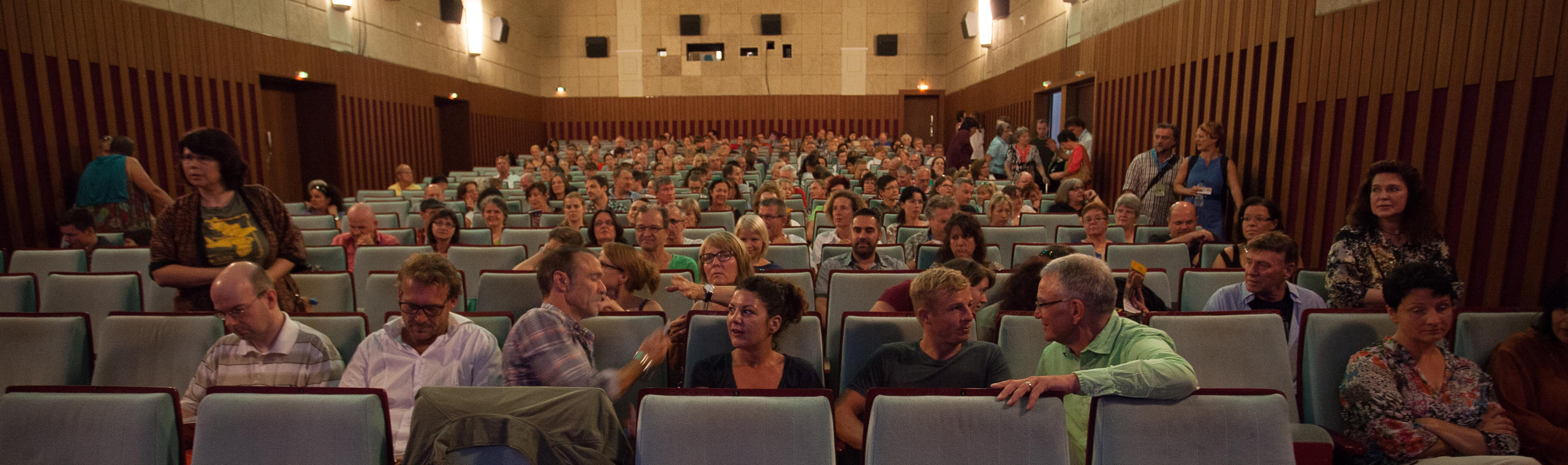
Audience at the NaturVision festival 2014

NaturVision is Germany's oldest nature, wildlife and environmental film festival. Launched in 2002 in Neuschönau in the Bavarian Forest, the festival moved to its new home of Ludwigsburg in the German state of Baden-Württemberg in 2012. The venue is the Central Theater Ludwigsburg. Since 2014 the festival has also offered a free open-air cinema, a market with regional and sustainable vendors and a science slam.

== The Festival ==
=== Film competition ===
At the heart of the festival is the international film competition. As well as nature and wildlife films, the NaturVision festival focuses heavily on environmental and sustainability issues. As well as the "German Conservation and Sustainability Film Award", the "German Wildlife Film Award" and the "German Biodiversity Film Award" are presented at the NaturVision award ceremony, where additional prize categories include camera work, dramatisation, film music, children's film and the audience award.

=== Special theme ===
Each year the festival is devoted to a special theme, which is presented in films, talks and special events. In recent years, themes have included "Soil & Water" and renewable energy. In 2015 it was planned to seek and present in particular solutions for global problems in a multi-year cycle under the slogan "Islands of the Future".

=== Environmental education ===
Another area in which the NaturVision Film Festival is active is educating young people about the environment. So for instance, in the run-up to the festival, many schools in Baden-Württemberg run programmes to which experts or filmmakers are invited. At the "Film & Discussion" youth media workshops, experts show films about sustainability issues to the school classes, while teachers' workshops explain the basics of media work with children and young people. As well as the school programme and childcare facilities, the festival also puts on a children's film programme for all age groups. In the film competition a separate youth jury chooses its favourites and announces them at the grand gala award ceremony. To ensure that it can also campaign on the cultural policy level for environmental education to be provided through the festival, NaturVision also became one of the founding members of the Association of Bavarian Film Festivals in 2014.

=== Industry Networking and Best-Of Events ===
Apart from the festival serving as a platform for NGOs focused on environmental topics, it also especially acts as meet up point for people in the film industry, offering workshops and opportunities for filmmakers, media representatives and other cultural creators to get together. Producers and filmmakers have the chance to engage with each other and the public. One of NaturVision's objectives is to support and promote the genre of nature and environmental film. One strategy for this is Best-Of events assembled from last year's program, which take place primarily in Switzerland.

=== Photographic competition "Europe's Natural Treasures" ===
Together with Euronatur, natur magazine and Gelsenwasser, NaturVision sponsors the photography competition "Europe's Natural Treasures", the results of which are compiled each year in the "Fascination of Nature" exhibition, which can be seen in various locations.

== History ==
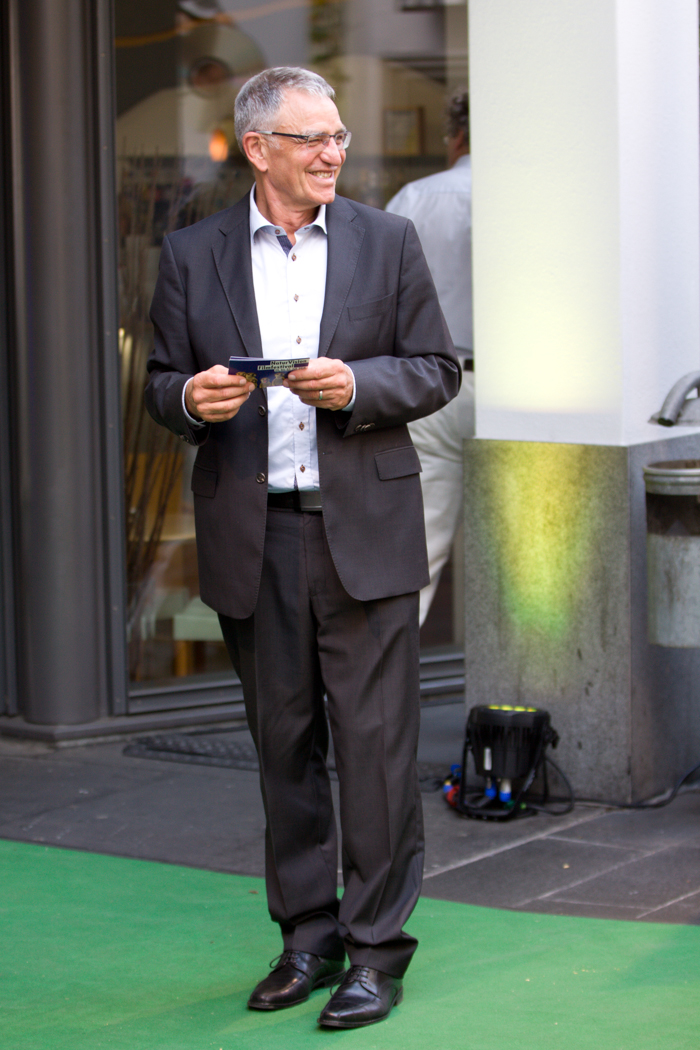
Festival director Ralph Thoms on NaturVision's official green carpet.

NaturVision was founded in 2002 by Ralph Thoms and was held annually in the Bavarian Forest National Park in Neuschönau, Germany. Because of the venue's proximity to the Czech border, the festival has enjoyed a collaboration with the Czech town of Vimperk since its early days.

Already in 2008 – as part of the German-Chinese Year of Science and Education – a collaboration with China was established, and German and Chinese filmmakers interacted for the first time in the workshops of the NaturVision Film Festival.

In 2012 the festival changed locations for financial reasons and was relaunched in Ludwigsburg in the German state of Baden-Württemberg. In the metropolitan area around Stuttgart, it has grown steadily since then and recorded over 13,000 visitors in 2016. The festival venue is the Central Theater Ludwigsburg, but the extensive supporting programme is spread over the whole city – from the open-air cinema in Arsenalplatz to the NaturVision Science Slam, which took place in the Film Gallery of the Filmakademie Baden-Württemberg in 2015.

The Bavarian Forest, meanwhile, is home to the NaturVision Film Days, which have been held in the Hans-Eisenmann-Haus in Neuschönau since 2012. Here, as well as the highlights of the Ludwigsburg festival, visitors can enjoy films that are of special interest for the region in the HeimatSachen series. What makes the Film Days so special is the location's proximity to nature, with films about nature being presented in nature – or rather, in an open-air cinema set up in the forest. NaturVision's youth environmental education efforts continue in the Bavarian Forest, with the ideas competition "Educational film: Naturally!" organised jointly with Bayernwerk AG, and a school programme before and during the contest inviting pupils to find out more about the environment and sustainability.

== Patron and supporters ==
Patron of the NaturVision Film Festival for the last two years has been Baden-Württemberg's premier Winfried Kretschmann (of political party Alliance '90/The Greens). For him the main focus of NaturVision is educating people about the environment:

"The nature film festival NaturVision in Ludwigsburg marks an important intersection between media and environmental education. This is where passion for film and nature meet." – Winfried Kretschmann

Another champion of the festival is German actor Andreas Hoppe, best known for his role as a police inspector in the popular TV crime series Tatort. He campaigns for animal welfare and the use of regional foods. Another celebrity guest and supporter of the festival is actor Hannes Jaenicke, whose production "Hannes Jaenicke in Action for ...." was awarded the first "NaturVision Film Festival Special Prize" in 2014.

Three Germany based media outlets have been the official presenters of the festival since 2015: the German subsidiary of Discovery Channel, the German-French culture channel arte and Ludwigsburg's local newspaper Ludwigsburger Kreiszeitung.

== Award winners ==
2012

- NaturVision Grand Prix – 1st Prize: "Life Size Memories", directed by Klaus Reisinger, Frédérique Lengaigne. Austria 2011.
- NaturVision Grand Prix – 2nd Prize: "Wildes Deutschland – Die Sächsische Schweiz" [Wild Germany – Saxon Switzerland], directed by Henry M. Mix. Germany 2011.
- German Conservation and Sustainability Film Award: "Raising Resistance", directed by Bettina Borgfeld, David Bernet. Germany / Switzerland 2011.
- NaturVision Camera Award: "Die Farben der Wüste – Die weisse Uyuni" [The Colors of the Desert – The White Uyuni], camera: Adrian Bailey. Austria 2013.
- NaturVision Children's Programme: "SOS Sevan", directed by unChild Eco-Club of Noratus. Armenia 2011.
- NaturVision Newcomer and Amateur Film Award: "Großmutter und der Wolf" [Grandmother and the Wolf], directed by Andreas Schnögl. Germany 2011.
- Special Prize of the City of Ludwigsburg and NaturVision Youth Jury Award: "Bottled Life", directed by Urs Schnell. Switzerland 2011.
- NaturVision Honorary Award: "Undercover gegen die Holzmafia" [Undercover Against the Wood Mafia], directed by Michaela Kirst. Germany 2011.
- NaturVision Audience Award: "Highway durch die Rocky Mountains – Herbst" [Highway Through the Rocky Mountains – Autumn], directed by Ernst Arendt, Hans Schweiger. Germany 2012.

2013

- NaturVision Grand Prix – 1st Prize: "The Unlikely Leopard", directed by Dereck & Beverly Joubert. South Africa 2012.
- NaturVision Grand Prix – 2nd Prize: "Wildes Deutschland - Die Lausitz" [Wild Germany – The Lausitz], directed by Henry M. Mix. Germany 2013.
- German Conservation and Sustainability Film Award – 1st Prize: "Der letzte Fang" [The Last Catch], directed by: Markus C.M. Schmidt. Germany 2012.
- German Conservation and Sustainability Film Award – 2nd Prize: "Auf leisen Pfoten – Spaniens letzte Luchse" [On Silent Paws – Spain's Last Lynx], directed by Klaus Feichtenberger. Austria 2012.
- NaturVision Camera Award: "Streifzug der Zebras" [Great Zebra Exodus], camera: Adrian Bailey. Austria 2013.
- NaturVision Best Story Award: "The Arctic Giant", author: Peter Lauridsen. Denmark 2013.
- NaturVision Children's Film Award: "Hassani und seine Walhaie" [Hassani and His Whale Sharks], directed by Frank Feustle. Germany 2013.
- NaturVision Newcomer Film Award: "San Agustín – Ebbe im Plastikmeer" [San Agustín – Low Tide in a Sea of Plastic], directed by: Gudrun Gruber, Alexander Hick, Michael Schmitt. Germany 2012.
- NaturVision Special Jury Prize: "Breathing Earth – Susumu Shingus Traum" [Breathing Earth – Susumu Shingu's Dream], directed by Thomas Riedelsheimer. Germany 2012.
- NaturVision Youth Jury Award: "Die Weltretter 3.0" [World's Saviours 3.0], directed by Jana Lemme. Germany 2012.
- NaturVision Audience Award: "Der letzte Fang" [The Last Catch], directed by Markus C.M. Schmidt. Germany 2012.
- NaturVision Honorary Award: "One Man's Desert", directed by Fan Zhiyuan. China 2011.

2014

- NaturVision Grand Prix – 1st Prize: "Der Große Kaukasus – Russlands Dach der Welt" [The Great Caucasus – Russia's Roof of the World], directed by Henry Mix. Germany 2014.
- NaturVision Grand Prix – 2nd Prize: "Hummeln – Bienen im Pelz" [Secrets of Bumblebees], directed by Kurt Mündl. Austria 2013.
- German Conservation and Sustainability Film Award – 1st Prize: "Wie wird die Stadt satt? – Der Kampf um die Nahrungsmärkte der Zukunft" [Feeding Cities – A Challenge for the Future], directed by Irja Martens. Germany 2013.
- German Conservation and Sustainability Film Award – 2nd Prize: "Meine Tante aus Fukushima" [My Atomic Aunt], directed by Kyoko Miyake. Germany 2013.
- NaturVision Camera Award: "Karussell des Lebens – Die Streuobstwiese" [Carousel of Life – The Traditional Orchard], camera: Alexandra Sailer, Steffen Sailer, Klaus Scheurich, Boas Schwarz. Germany 2014.
- NaturVision Best Story Award: "The Second Wave", author: Folke Ryden. Sweden 2013.
- NaturVision Film Music Award – 1st Prize: "Mythos Kongo – Fluss der Extreme" [Myths of the Congo – River of Extremes], music by Oliver Heuss. Germany 2014.
- NaturVision Film Music Award – 2nd Prize: "Der Große Kaukasus – Russlands Dach der Welt" [The Great Caucasus – Russia's Roof of the World], music by Jörg Magnus Pfeil. Germany 2014.
- NaturVision Children's Film Award: "Newton – Der Nashornranger" [Newton – The Rhino Ranger], directed by Frank Feustle. Germany 2014.
- NaturVision Newcomer Film Award: "Mit anderen Augen – die Geschichte von Pferd und Mensch" [Through Different Eyes – The History of Horse and Man], directed by Lena Leonhardt. Germany 2013.
- NaturVision Special Jury Prize [Category: Biodiversity]: "Die Eroberer – Die Königskrabbe" [King Crab – The Conqueror], directed by Nicolas Gabriel. France 2013.
- NaturVision Special Prize: "Hannes Jaenicke im Einsatz für Elefanten" [Hannes Jaenicke: Working for Elephants], directed by Judith Adloch, Eva Gfirtner. Germany 2014.
- NaturVision Youth Jury Award: "Die Letzten ihrer Art – Rettung der Goldkopflanguren" [The Last of Their Kind – Saving the Golden-Headed Langur], directed by Hannes Schuler. Germany 2013.
- NaturVision Audience Award: "Superhirne im Federkleid – Kluge Vögel im Duell" [Masterminds among Birds], directed by Volker Arzt. Germany 2013.

2015

- German Conservation and Sustainability Film Award: "Der letzte Raubzug" [Gambling on Extinction], directed by Jakob Kneser. Germany 2014.
- NaturVision Wildlife Film Award: "Wildes Brasilien – Das wilde Herz" [Brazil: A Natural History – Wild Heart], produced by Terra Mater Factual Studios. Germany 2015.
- NaturVision Biodiversity Film Award: "Bienen – Eine Welt im Wandel" [Secrets of the Hive], directed by Dennis Wells. Germany/Austria/USA 2015.
- NaturVision Camera Award: "Wildes Kanada – Der Hohe Norden" [Wild Canada: Ice Edge], camera: Jeff Turner, Justin Maguire. Austria 2014.
- NaturVision Best Story Award: "Triumph der Tomate" [Triumph of the Tomato], author: Maria Magdalena Koller. Austria 2014.
- NaturVision Film Music Award: "Wenn ein Garten wächst" [When a Garden Grows], music by Thomas Höhl. Germany 2014.
- NaturVision Children's Film Award: "Jessica - Das Indianermädchen vom Amazonas" [Jessica – The Amazon Indian Girl], directed by Alexander Preuss. Germany 2014.
- NaturVision Special Jury Prize: "Wilde Slowakei" [Wild Slovakia], directed by Jan Haft. Germany 2015.
- NaturVision Youth Jury Award: "Bienen – Eine Welt im Wandel" [Secrets of the Hive], directed by Dennis Wells. Germany/Austria/USA 2015.
- NaturVision Audience Award: "Wilhelminenhof – Obstbauern mit Biss" [Wilhelminenhof – Fruit Farmers Go Their Own Way], directed by Vivien Pieper, Johannes Bünger. Germany 2014.
- NaturVision Honorary Award: Kurt Hirschel for his life's work.

2016

- German Conservation and Sustainability Film Award: "Waste Cooking - Kochen statt Verschwenden" [Cooking Instead of Wasting], directed by Georg Misch. Austria 2015.
- NaturVision Wildlife Film Award: "Die Reise der Schneeeule" [The Snow Owls Travel], directed by Brian Mc Clatchy, Dietmar Nill, Klaus Weißmann. Germany 2014.
- NaturVision Biodiversity Film Award: "Das Yellowstone Rätsel" [The Yellowstone Riddle], directed by Manfred Corrine. Germany 2015.
- NaturVision Camera Award: "Zurück zum Urwald - Nationalpark Kalkalpen" [Back to the Jungle - National Park Limestone Alps], camera: Jiri Petr, Michael Schlamberger. Austria 2015.
- NaturVision Best Story Award: "Wo unser Wetter entsteht" [Where our weather originates], author: Rolf Schlenker. Germany 2016.
- NaturVision Film Music Award: "Magie der Moore" [Magic of the Fenlands], music by Jörg Magnus Pfeil, Siggie Mueller. Germany 2015.
- NaturVision Film Award Bavaria: "Die Wilderin" [The Poacher], directed by Jonas Julian Köck. German 2015.
- NaturVision Children's Film Award: "Lotumi und der Rote Tanz" [Lotumi and the Red Dance], directed by Frank Feustle. Germany 2015.
- NaturVision Newcomer Prize: "Passion for Planet", directed by Werner Schuessler. Germany 2016.
- NaturVision Audience Award: "Auf der Spur der Küstenwölfe" [Tracing the Coastal Wolves], directed by Richard Matthews. Germany 2007.
