= Rolwaling Valley =

Rolwaling Valley रोल्वालिङ उपत्यका
- Valleys of Nepal
- Nickname: The Land of Wild Yaks
- Country: Nepal
- Province: Bagmati Province
- District: Dolakha District
- Time zone: UTC+5:45 (Nepal Time)

Rolwaling Valley is also known as “The Hidden Gem of the Himalayas”. It is situated in Dolkha District, Nepal, close to the Tibet (China) border. It lies west of the Khumbu (Everest) region. And it is surrounded by the Gaurishankar Himal (7,134 m) and other snow-capped peaks. It is connected to the Khumbu valley via the Tashi Lapcha Pass (5,755 m).

== Exploration History ==
The first Western exploration of the valley was carried out by Eric Shipton in 1951, during the Mount Everest reconnaissance expedition.

Since then, the valley has attracted trekkers, mountaineers, and anthropologists due to its unique geography, challenging trekking routes, and rich Sherpa culture.

== Cultural and Natural Significance ==
The valley is regarded as sacred in both Buddhist and Hindu traditions, with Gaurishankar Himal dominating the skyline.

It is believed to be one of the “Beyuls” (hidden valleys blessed by Guru Padmasambhava as places of refuge and spiritual practice).

The Sherpa villages like Na and Bedding are cultural hubs, where festivals, monasteries, and traditional lifestyles remain well-preserved.

== Sherpa Clans in Rolwaling ==
The Sherpa population of Rolwaling Valley is divided into distinct clans, each with its own lineage and traditions. Major clans include:

- Chusherpa (Ngonpa/Ngonba)
- Murminso
- Rukpa
- Sakywa
- Lakshindo
- Salakha
- Sangu

These clans have preserved their culture, rituals, and Tibetan Buddhist traditions for centuries, adding to the valley’s cultural richness.
