= Kim Chang-ho (climber) =

South Korean mountaineer (1969–2018)

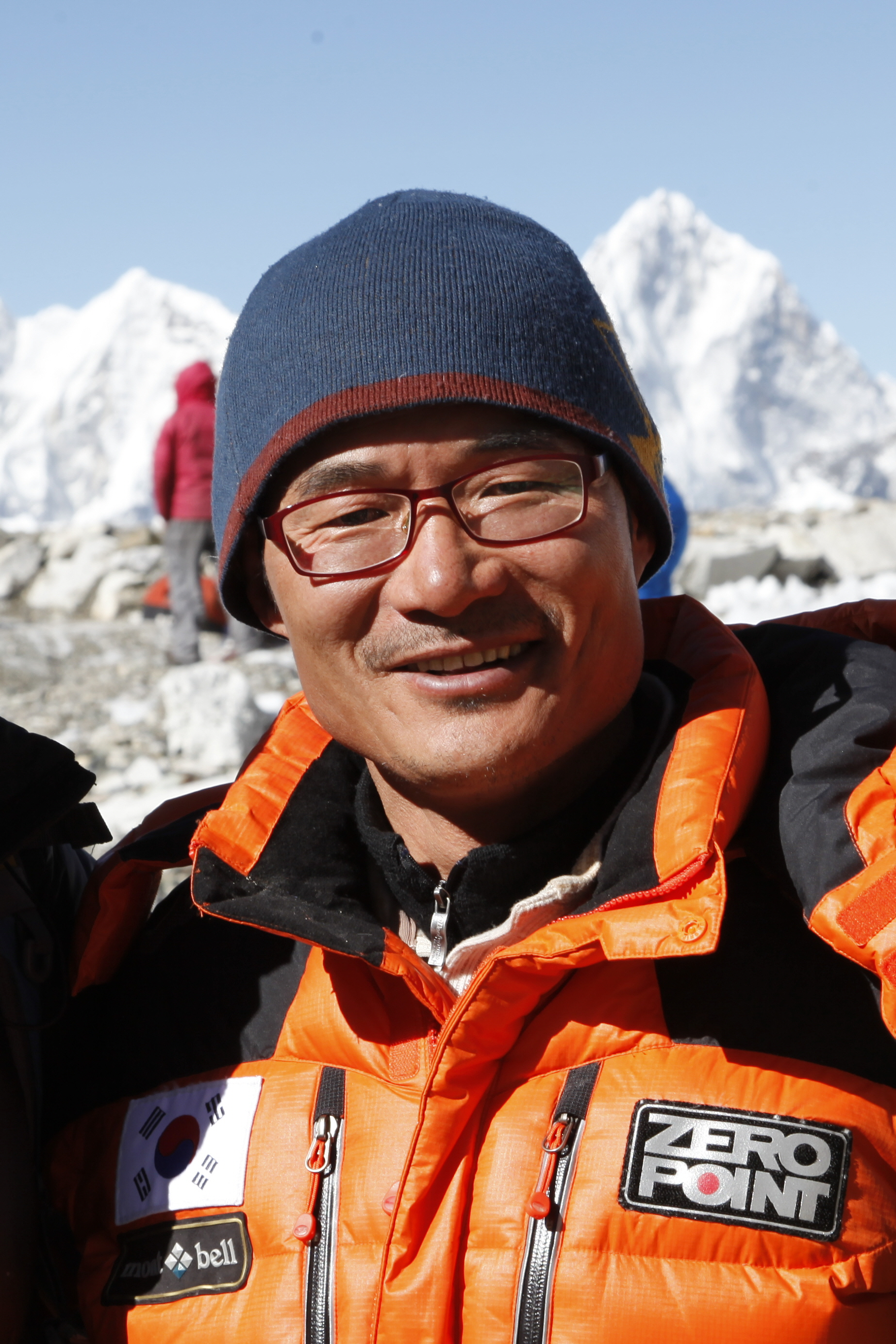
- Kim Chang-ho at Everest base camp in April 2013.

Personal information
- Nationality: South Korean
- Born: 15 September 1969 Yecheon Town, South Korea
- Died: 11 October 2018 (aged 49) Gurja Himal, Nepal
- Education: University of Seoul

Climbing career
- Type of climber: Alpine climbing
- First ascents: Batura II (7,762m, 2008), Himjung (7140m, 2012)
- Major ascents: Gangapurna South Face (7,455m, 2016)
- Known for: Fastest ascent of all 14 eight-thousanders without oxygen

Kim Chang-ho (Korean: 김창호; 15 September 1969 – 11 October 2018), was a South Korean mountaineer, and at the time of his death in 2018, was considered to be Korea's most prolific alpine and Himalayan climber, noted for his bold and lightweight alpine-style ascents.

In 2012, Kim won the Piolet d'Or "Asia Award" with An Chi-young when they made the first-ever ascent of Himjung (7,092m) in Nepal in 2012 via its southwest face. In 2017, Kim and his two climbing partners were awarded an Honourable Mention for the 2017 Piolet d'Or for their ascent of Gangapurna's south face (7,455m, 2016) in a "bold lightweight alpine style", the first Koreans to receive such a citation.

In 2013, he became the first Korean to climb all 14 of the eight-thousanders without supplemental oxygen; he also set a record for completing the feat in the shortest time at 7 years, 10 months and 6 days. He was killed on 11 October 2018, alongside several other fellow South Korean climbers and local mountain guides, in Nepal when a strong gust of wind, driven by falling seracs and snow destroyed their 3,500m-altitude base camp beneath Gurja Himal in the Dhaulagiri.

== Early life and education ==
Kim Chang-ho was born in the rural town of Yecheon-gun near the center of South Korea on 15 September 1969. Kim performed well in his intramural handball team in his elementary school, playing at the province-level sports festival.

In 1988, he entered the University of Seoul (UOS) with a major in International Trade, but he did not graduate until 2013 due to his regular participation in international climbing expeditions. Kim said that he decided that in order to complete his undergraduate degree that he needed to learn more in humanities for the sake of climbing. Eventually, he graduated with a degree in Business Administration.

== Mountaineering career ==
=== University Alpine Club (1988–2000) ===
Once Kim joined the UOS Alpine Club, he significantly increased his climbing and mountaineering activities. By the 1990s, Kim was rock climbing routes graded 5.12, and participated in two Karakoram expeditions organized by UOS Alpine Club: Great Trango (6,286m, 1993) and Gasherbrum IV (7,925m, 1996). In both expeditions, Kim was one of the lead climbers, creating a reputation of a bold and even reckless approach to climbing. For example, on a new route on the east face of Gasherbrum IV, Kim and his partner reached 7,450m. (Note: According to Lee Gye-Nam, the leader of the University of Seoul Gasherbrum IV Expedition in 1996, 7,450 m is the best measure of the height Kim reached. While Kim stated in the interview with Monthly Magazine Mountain in 2013 that he climbed another 20 m from 7,450 m, Lee said "the pitch was short and they were unable to proceed far from the belay point.") Facing the impasse of a rocky face with no cracks to secure protection, Kim told his partner: "Let the rope go if I got a fall!". Kim referred to this and other moments in the 90's as "my immature younger years when I pursued only great achievements on mountains".

=== Pakistan exploration (2000–2004) ===
Kim came to international climbing attention in 2000 when he undertook a solo exploration of the Karakoram. From 2000 to 2004, Kim surveyed mountain ranges across the Karakoram, the Hindu Kush, and the Pamir Mountains in northern Pakistan. He walked many mid-to-large-sized glaciers, crossed numerous passes, investigated and took photos of known or unknown peaks which he judged noteworthy for climbing. In several cases, he was first to step on the deepest side of remote glaciers, or was only second to the 19th century Western explorers. He collected local names of the peaks, passes, and glaciers, and meticulously compared them with those in several different maps of the regions. Kim published his findings and experiences in the Seoul-based Monthly Magazine Mountain and shared his knowledge of unclimbed peaks, leading to the first ascent of Amphu I (6,740m) in the Mahalangur Himal by three Korean mountaineers.

An example of Kim's attention to detail was shown in 2003, when he had to name two 6,000 metre peaks for which he made the first ascent in the Chiantar valley, Hindu Raj. The first peak is labeled in Tsuneo Miyamori's 2001 map as "Suj Sar SW", pairing with a nearby 6,177m-peak named "Suj Sar NE". Kim identified that the two peaks were completely separate. Kim also observed that while "Sar" means peak in the Wakhi language, the Shina language was the local vernacular language where a distinct peak is called a "Kor". Since each peak was located closely to Atar Sar and to Haiz Gah, Kim and an informed villager came up with new names: "Atar Kor" (6,189m) and "Haiz Kor" (6,105m).

His notes included books, journals, rolls of films, and a digital database of 2.4 terabytes. Kim's climbing partner and biographer, Young-Hoon Oh, argues, "As far as I know, in the mountain ranges in northern Pakistan no one has ever ventured a geographic exploration in such a massive scale and in such a meticulous manner, nor anyone or any institution has accumulated mountaineering geographic information of the area in such comprehensiveness and detail." Even at the time of his death, Kim was known to have kept a detailed plan of new climbing routes in the region for the next five years.

=== High altitude climbs (2005–2018) ===
He then began to climb the fourteen eight-thousanders. The still young and relatively unheard-of Kim shined to the eyes of Hong Bo-Sung, the leader of Busan Alpine Federation's fourteen-peak project. Under the leadership of Hong, combined with Kim's skills and experience on high mountains, Busan Dynamic Hope Expedition excelled on 8000m peaks. Highly pragmatic in their approach, the expedition consisted of a small team of three to four, barely relying on external support such as Sherpas and oxygen tanks. The whole project was completed in mere five years and four months (2006-2011).

Kim completing ascents of all fourteen eight-thousanders from 2006 to 2013, without using bottled oxygen, and in the shortest-ever period of 7 years and 10 months (a record until broken by Nirmal Purja in October 2019 with supplemental oxygen, and without oxygen in 2024).

Kim also climbed formidable new routes and first ascents in the Himalayas and the Karakoram. Peaks and faces on which Kim opened a new route included Pakistan's Shikari (5,928m, 2001) in the Yasin valley, Khache Brangsa (5,560m, 2001) in the Arandu valley, a new route on Nanga Parbat's Rupal face (8,125m, 2005), Nepal's Gangapurna's south face (7,455m, 2016), Gangapurna West's south face (7,140m, 2016), and Papsura's south face (6,451m, 2017) in India. For his part in the ascent of Gangapurna, Kim and his two colleagues earned one of the two Honourable Mentions bestowed in the 2017 Piolet d'Or awards for major ascents - the first-ever for a Korean.

The list of his first ascents included: partnered ascents in Batura II (7,762m) in Pakistan and Himjung (7,140m) in Nepal, both with partner(s), as well as solo ascents in Pakistan of an unnamed peak (6,006m) near the Lupgarsar pass, Delhi Sang-i-sar (6,225m) in the Chapursan valley, Atar Kor (6,189m), Haiz Kor (6,105m) in the Chiantar range, and Bakma Brakk (6,150m, or Bukma peak).

=== Death (2018) ===
In 2018, Kim planned to climb Gurja Himal's untouched 3,800m-long south face in the alpine style. This climb was part of what he called the "Korean Way Project", an unconfined series of Himalayan climbs he embarked from 2016. The project aimed to climb a new route on a mountain, with no external assistance. Interestingly, Kim specified the following three criteria in the choice of climbing destination: the potential merit of exploration in the entire travel, the mountain's significance in the local culture, and the planned route's naturalness. This stylistic, innovative approach to mountaineering stems from his own mountaineering philosophy that distinctively concerns the ethics of relationship, or what he called “mountaineering of coexistence".

The bodies of Kim's team were found scattered around the cliffs below their Gurja Himal base camp as far as 500m away. Many have inferred the cause of the accident to be the blast of an avalanche that occurred while everyone slept. The Google Earth image shows a massive serac at the edge of the upper plateau on 5,900 m to the west of Gurja Himal's summit. It is hypothesized that the serac broke off and a strong gust of wind caused by the fall swept the base camp straight down the wall. It is inferred that the accident occurred between the evening of October 10 and the morning of October 11, based on the fact that Kim Chang-Ho’s meticulous journal recorded its last entry on October 10.

== See also ==
- Nirmal Purja, world speed record holder for 14 eight-thousander ascents (with use of supplementary oxygen)
