= Alan Hinkes =

British Himalayan mountaineer

Personal information
- Full name: Alan Charles Hinkes
- Nationality: English
- Born: 26 April 1954 (age 72) Northallerton, North Riding of Yorkshire, England
- Spouse: never married
- Children: Fiona Horgan (b. 1984)

Climbing career
- Type of climber: Mountaineering
- Major ascents: Mount Everest 1996; K2 1995; Annapurna 2002; Kangchenjunga 2005; Nanga Parbat 1998; All 14 8,000m Peaks; 1987–2005 (Cho Oyu is disputed); Eiger North Face.

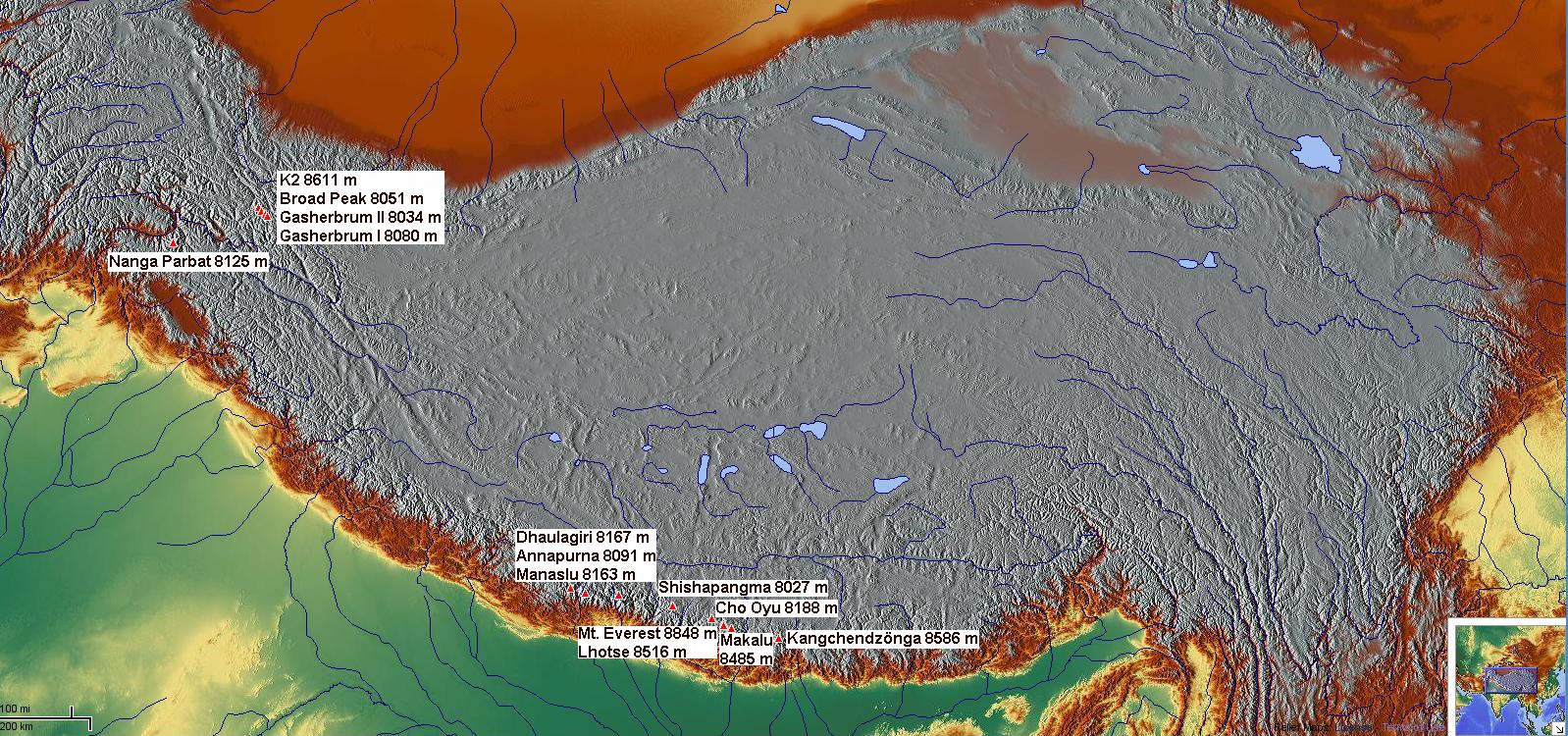
Location of all the 14 eight-thousanders

Alan Hinkes OBE (born 26 April 1954) is an English Himalayan high-altitude mountaineer from Northallerton in North Yorkshire. He is the first British mountaineer to claim all 14 Himalayan eight-thousanders (mountains above 8,000 m (26,247 ft) in height), a feat he completed on 30 May 2005.

== 14 Eight-thousanders ==
=== British record ===
Hinkes is the first British mountaineer to claim to have summited all 14 mountains with elevations above 8,000 metres (26,247 ft), known as the eight-thousanders, when he summited Kangchenjunga on 30 May 2005, aged 50 years and 34 days.

It was first achieved by Reinhold Messner in 1986 (all without oxygen), and two decades later, Hinkes was only the 13th person to claim the feat, days after U.S. climber Ed Viesturs became the 12th person on 22 May 2005.

It is a rare feat, as the ratio of deaths to summits on several eight-thousanders is at one-in-five (Annapurna, K2, Nanga Parbat, Kangchenjunga). This should not be interpreted as meaning that a "death-rate" is circa 20%, as the statistic ignores the number of attempts (and also partial attempts, and/or route stocking activity etc.). However, given that climbing the eight-thousanders requires multiple failed attempts (Hinkes took two attempts on average), and the most failures are usually on the most dangerous mountains, the risk of death in attempting all 14 eight-thousanders is material.

Hinkes took 26 attempts to climb the 14 eight-thousanders (not counting his ascent of Shishapangma Central (West) in 1990), giving a first attempt success rate of circa 54%. Hinkes spent 21 years on his "Challenge 8000", starting with his ascent of Shishapangma in 1987, and ending with his ascent of Kangchenjunga in 2005. Hinkes is recorded as summiting Mount Everest on 19 May 1996.

=== Observations ===
He regards K2 as the hardest eight-thousander mountain ("an easy place to die"), which he climbed on his third attempt (he abandoned his first attempt, when closing in on the summit, to rescue a stricken Swedish climber). He ranks Kanchenjunga as the second hardest eight-thousander mountain, which he also climbed on his third attempt.

As an eight-thousander climber, Hinkes has encountered death on his own expeditions, and on neighbouring expeditions. Several of his climbing partners subsequently died on mountains. A particular death that Hinkes notes was fellow U.K. climbing partner, Alison Hargreaves, who died on K2 in 1995, weeks after Hinkes had summited K2.

Hinkes had to be air rescued from Nanga Parbat in July 1997 when flour from a burnt chapati got up his nose, making him sneeze so violently that he prolapsed a disc. He had to wait 10 days in agony before being rescued and brought to Islamabad for treatment. He has been referred to as the "chapati man" (even by himself) from this incident.

Hinkes has climbed eight-thousanders in many styles: expeditions (Cho Oyu, Manaslu, Nanga Parbat), two-man alpine (Makalu, Dhaulagiri) and alone (Gasherbrum I, Gasherbrum II), and permutations in between. He has climbed new lines (Shishapangma, Kangchenjunga, Annapurna), he has climbed as guide (Broad Peak), as camera man (Everest), and set speed records (Annapurna). He has climbed several on first attempt, others on third (Nanga Parbat) and fourth attempt (Makalu). He has climbed with well-known mountaineers, including several expeditions with Doug Scott and Chris Bonington.

He describes himself as risk-averse ("I climb to live, not to die", "The summit is optional, getting down is mandatory"), who places value on understanding, and being in the right position, to capitalise on breaks in weather. His later climbs were mostly two-man climbs with experienced sherpas (Pasang Gelu), where Hinkes could stay in control of events and react quickly. He was not averse to leveraging the resources of bigger expeditions alongside. Unusually for a 20–year high-altitude Himalayan eight-thousander, he has never lost any fingers or toes (or "other bits" as he describes it), to frostbite.

Over the years, Hinkes has had public arguments with other chasers of the 14 eight-thousanders. Australian climber Andrew Lock (who completed all 14 in 2009), was critical of Hinkes on their successful 1998 ascent of Nanga Parbat. Spanish climber Iñaki Ochoa de Olza, (who died on Annapurna of pulmonary edema, after completing 12 eight thousanders without oxygen), alleges that Hinkes had left him to bleed to death in order to summit K2, which Hinkes countered was factually untrue (Hinkes abandoned his first K2 climb, despite nearing the summit, to successfully rescue a stricken Swedish climber).

== Cho Oyu dispute ==
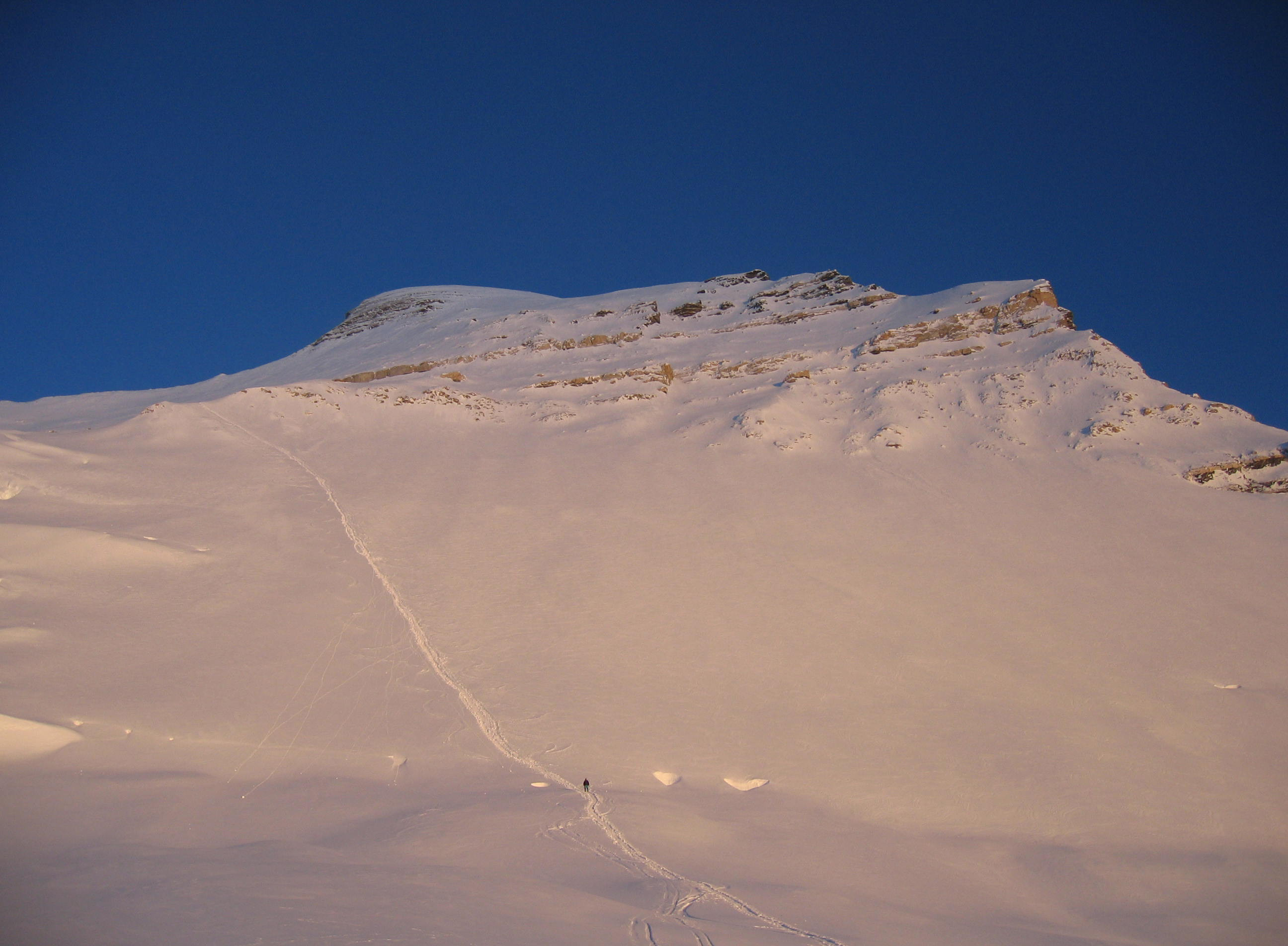
Cho Oyu: Showing the route from camp III at 7,500 m (24,606 ft), which crosses the "yellow bands", to get to the final flat summit plateau.

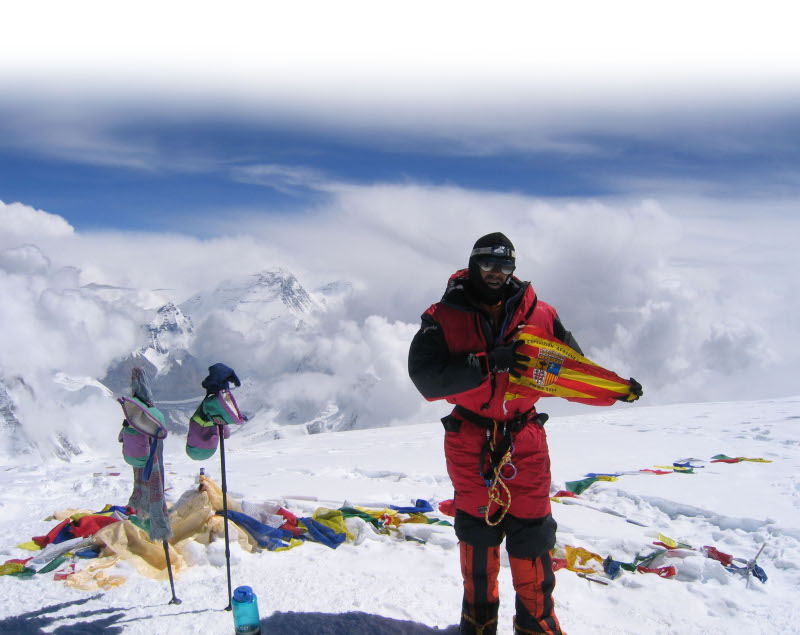
Carlos Pauner: The Spanish mountaineer recording his 5th official eight-thousander, on the plateau of Cho Oyu, at the "prayer flags" with "view of everest" (the Elizabeth Hawley criteria), but circa 15 mins away from the "technical" summit.

His 30 April 1990 ascent of Cho Oyu, which he completed alone in low visibility, is disputed by one observer. Cho Oyu has a broadly flat summit plateau with no cairn (the traditional prayer flags on Cho Oyu's summit plateau do not mark the "technical" summit). The summit is a small unmarked "hump" (or "bump") (which many Cho Oyu YouTube summit videos miss). While the height differential of this hump is small, Ralf Dujmovits, 3-time Cho Oyu summiteer, notes that for a strong climber to get to the "hump" area can take another 30 minutes.

The source of the dispute was that Himalayan chronicler Elizabeth Hawley, whose Himalayan Database is used by online databases like AdventureStats, "unrecognised" his Cho Oyu ascent in Spring 2005 (15 years after summiting). Hawley based her decision on an interview with Hinkes, and on other team members. Hawley agrees Hinkes reached the summit plateau (as does Eberhard Jurgalski's list), but questions how Hinkes could have been on the “technical” summit for certain, if he could not see it.

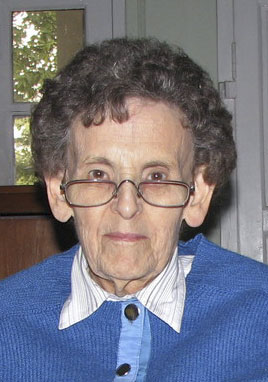
Elizabeth Hawley: The influential Himalayan chronicler decided, years after Hinkes' climb, not to accept his view; she remains the only publicly verifiable source of dispute on Hinkes' climb. She died in 2018.

But his claim to have now climbed all 8000ers is open to question. In April 1990 he and others reached the summit plateau of Cho Oyu. It was misty so they could not see well; nine years later Hinkes said he had “wandered around for a while” in the summit area but could see very little and eventually descended to join the others, one of whom said they had not reached the top.

— Elizabeth Hawley, "Seasonal Stories", page 347, Spring 2005

Hinkes logged the expedition's 30 April 1990 Cho Oyu ascent in the 1991 American Alpine Journal (AAJ), as well as the expedition's ascent of Shishapangma 12 days later on 12 May 1990, but he notes they climbed Shishapangma's central (west) summit (the true summit is circa two hours further on). Hawley's biography notes French expedition leader Benoît Chamoux "unhappy with this, as she did not credit Chamoux with Shishapangma either" (Hawley had compelled the famous Himalayan mountaineer Ed Viesturs to re-climb Shishapangma for the same reason, which he did). Hinkes would not climb with Benoît Chamoux, or any of the French team members, again.

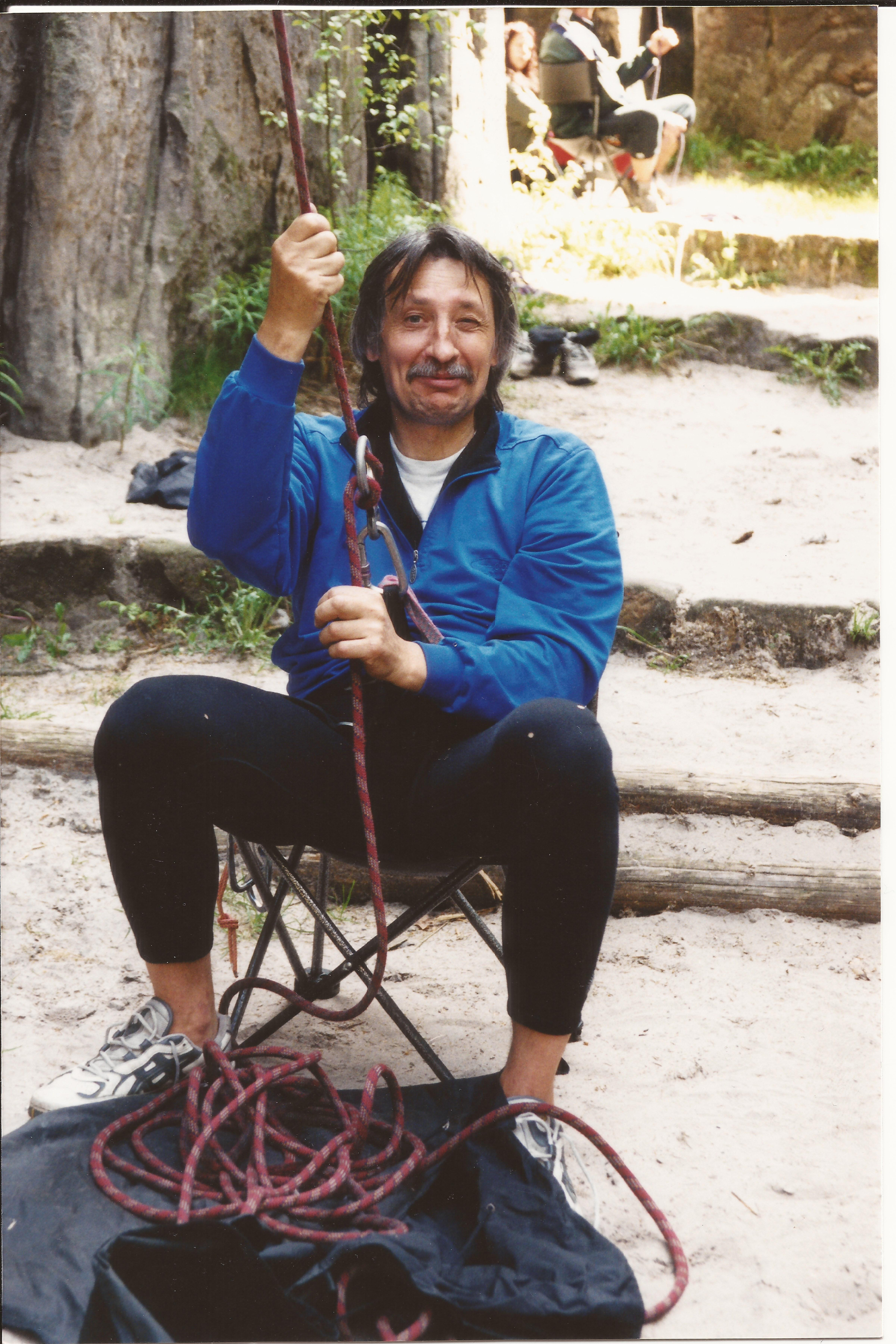
Josef Rakoncaj: Czech Himalayan mountaineer photographed Hinkes on the summit plateau of Cho Oyu in 1990 and claims the ascent

Hawley does not use the public accounts of the non-French team members. Czech team member Josef Rakoncaj photographed Hinkes on the summit plateau of Cho Oyu (Hinkes with his usual photo of his daughter held out), and states Hinkes summited in his book Na hrotech zeměkoule (co-authored with Miloš Jasanský, 1993). Italian team member Mauro Rossi lists the 1990 ascent of Cho Oyu in his public resume. Climbers with several Cho Oyu ascents, have disputed Hawley's main Cho Oyu summit criteria, "Did you see Everest?" (which is obviously unhelpful in Hinkes' case given the poor visibility), and the incorrect behaviours it is creating.

Hawley's Himalayan Database records 3,681 ascents of Cho Oyu of which 18 are "unrecognised" since 1960, despite the difficulty of finding Cho Oyu's "technical" summit, and that older expeditions considered the summit plateau as sufficient. Chamoux's 1990 Cho Oyu expedition comprise seven of these "unrecognised" ascents (including Alan Hinkes), while a German commercial trekking expedition, led by Günther Härter, who summited Cho Oyu just 19 days after Chamoux in 1990 (and also in very low visibility, as recorded by the Germans), comprise another six.

The dispute is noted in many Hinkes interviews. He highlights the lack of any evidence, or publicly verifiable sources, for the allegation, and he is supported by the Alpine Journal, and the British Mountaineering Council (BMC). Hinkes says he spent "at least an hour and a half" criss-crossing the flat summit plateau, alone, until he "was sure there was no more uphill". Hawley's "Seasonal Stories" suggest an aversion to Hinkes, and her biography lists Alan Hinkes as a climber "she did not like".

I spent at least an hour and a half covering every inch of ground on the summit plateau until, in the end, I was absolutely certain that I could not get any higher. There was no more uphill.

— Alan Hinkes, "Alan Hinkes on climbing the world's highest mountains", The Scotsman, 9 November 2013

AdventureStats.com record 8,000m ascents not independently verified. Their website ("Verifications and Disputes") states that unless given written proof otherwise, "No proof other than the explorer's word is required", implying they give credit to Hawley's unverified allegations. It contrasts, for example, with Hawley, AdventureStats, and Eberhard Jurgalski's, acceptance of Denis Urubko's acclaimed 2009 ascent of Cho Oyu's Southeast face (and his 14th official eight-thousander), who reached the Cho Oyu summit plateau in the dark and in a snowstorm, per his summit photo from his AAJ log. (ascent number 2785 on Hawley's Himalayan Database).

The paragraph in Elizabeth Hawley's 2005 Seasonal Stories remains the only publicly verifiable source of the dispute over Hinkes' Cho Oyu ascent. No climbing journal disputes Hinkes' ascent, and some publicly support it. However, Hawley retains a well-earned stature as a Himalayan chronicler, and her Himalayan Database is the source for most online Himalayan ascent databases (e.g. AdventureStats). Hawley died in 2018.

== Personal ==
In January 2006, after Kangchenjunga, Hinkes was awarded an OBE in the 2006 New Year Honours List for his achievements in mountaineering. He was awarded an Honorary Fellowship of the University of Sunderland in 1999, and an Honorary Doctorate from the University of York in 2007. He was awarded Yorkshire Man of the Year in 2005, and was made an honorary citizen of his hometown Northallerton in the same year.

Hinkes is an avid photographer and released a photographic essay book in October 2013 called 8000 Metres Climbing the World's Highest Mountains. He is the subject of an October 2017 documentary by filmmaker, Terry Abraham, Alan Hinkes: The First Briton To Climb The World's Highest Mountains. Hinkes has frequently appeared on British television over the years, particularly regarding Himalayan events/stories, including BBC News, Sky News, Newsnight etc.

Hinkes started life as a geography and PE teacher, which he abandoned to concentrate on climbing. He never married but has a daughter, Fiona, whose picture (with her son, Jay McGrath (plays football for Doncaster Rovers)), Hinkes displays in most summit photographs.

== Ascents ==
=== Eight-thousanders ===
This list includes all 27 successful and unsuccessful 8,000 metre expeditions, as also noted by Alan Hinkes in his book, but reconciled from several other published climbing journal articles (and also using the American Alpine Journal online database):

- May 1984 – Mount Everest – Failed on North (Tibetan) side of mountain (first attempt) with Cumbrian Everest Expedition.
- 19 September 1987 – Shishapangma – Climbed new route on Central Couloir North Face, with U.S. climber Steve Untch, two person alpine-style.
- October 1987 – Lhotse – Failed on South Face, alpine style, with polish climber Krzysztof Wielicki in storms.
- October 1988 – Makalu – Failed with Rick Allen / Doug Scott in alpine-style climb, due to injury and evacuation of Rick Allen.
- 12 May 1989 – Manaslu – Climbed South Face/Pillar with Benoît Chamoux French expedition, first British ascent.
- 30 April 1990 – Cho Oyu – Climbed (disputed) West Face with Benoît Chamoux French expedition; solo to summit alone as team separated at summit plateau.
- 12 May 1990 – Shishapangma – Climbed Central (West) Summit, with Benoît Chamoux French expedition, on new route in North Face Couloir.
- May 1991 – Mount Everest – Failed on North (Tibetan) side of mountain (second attempt).
- 16 July 1991 – Broad Peak – Climbed as guide for Jagged Globe expeditions.
- August 1992 – Nanga Parbat – Failed on Mazeno Ridge and Schell Route with Doug Scott expedition (first attempt).
- August 1993 – K2 – Failed on South East Ridge Abruzzi Spur (first attempt), abandoned climb to conduct rescue of Swedish climber.
- August 1994 – K2 – Failed on North Face (China side) in Anglo-American expedition due to avalanche risk (second attempt).
- April 1995 – Makalu – Failed due to accident on route to mountain, leg pierced by bamboo stick and evacuated to Bangkok (second attempt).
- 17 July 1995 – K2 – Climbed South East Ridge Abruzzi Spur (on third attempt). Was climbing with Alison Hargreaves on U.S. expedition.
- 19 May 1996 – Mount Everest – Climbed North Ridge (Mallory Route), filming for the TV documentary Summit Fever (third attempt).
- 10 July 1996 – Gasherbrum I – Climbed alone and unsupported.
- 29 July 1996 – Gasherbrum II – Climbed South Face alone and unsupported.
- 23 May 1997 – Lhotse – Climbed South West Face Couloir mostly alone, but encountered other groups (second attempt).
- May 1997 – Makalu – Failed with Fabrizio Zangrilli, abandoned when weather turned and Fabrizio Zangrilli was injured (third attempt).
- 22 July 1997 – Nanga Parbat – Forced to abort attempt after sneezing on chapati flour resulted in a prolapsed disc in his back (second attempt).
- 21 July 1998 – Nanga Parbat – Climbed Kinshofer Route on Diamir Face on Italian expedition (incl. Kurt Diemberger) (third attempt).
- 23 May 1999 – Makalu – Climbed with alpine–style two man ascent with sherpa Dawa Chirring (fourth attempt).
- May 2000 – Kangchenjunga – Failed because of bad weather conditions, broke arm on descent when snow bridge collapsed (first attempt).
- 6 May 2002 – Annapurna – Climbed new North Face route, first British ascent for 32 years, and set new speed record.
- April 2003 – Kangchenjunga – Failed due to poor weather and SARS-like virus (second attempt).
- 17 May 2004 – Dhaulagiri – Climbed in two–man alpine ascent with Pasang Gelu.
- 30 May 2005 – Kangchenjunga – Climbed new line on South West Face, in two-man ascent with Pasang Gelu, summiting on 30 May 2005 (third attempt).

=== Other mountains ===
- 1988 Menlungtse West (23,041 ft / 7,023m) FA via West Ridge. Summit attained with Andy Fanshawe (UK), with Chris Bonington (UK), David Breashears and Steve Shea (both USA) in support.

== Filmography ==
- Terry Abraham (Director) (2017). Alan Hinkes: The First Briton To Climb The World's Highest Mountains (DVD).
- Terry Abraham (Director) (2014). Life of a Mountain: A Year on Scafell Pike (DVD).

== Bibliography ==
- Hinkes, Alan (2013). 8000 METRES Climbing the World's highest mountains. Cicerone Press. ISBN 978-1852845483.

== See also ==
- List of 20th-century summiteers of Mount Everest
- eight-thousanders details of all 8000m mountains and key ascents
