= Alasdair McKenzie =

British mountaineer (born 2004)

Personal information
- Citizenship: British and French
- Born: 20 June 2004 (age 22) Lorient, France
- Occupation: Mountaineer
- Website: alasdair-mckenzie.com

Climbing career
- Type of climber: Mountaineering
- Known for: Summitting all 14 eight-thousanders
- Updated on 25 October 2026

Alasdair McKenzie (born 20 June 2004) is a French-British mountaineer. At only twenty years old, he climbed all fourteen eight thousanders. He was the youngest mountaineer to climb Lhotse, when he summited in 2022, and was the youngest to climb the 5 highest eight-thousanders when he ascended K2 in July 2023.

== Early life ==
Born in Lorient, in Bretagne, French-British, Alasdair McKenzie moved to Chamonix at the age of 9, then to Tignes. He competed in alpine skiing, particularly super-G and downhill, until the age of sixteen. It was during his ascent of Mont Blanc, which he undertook before the age of seventeen, that Alasdair decided to dedicate himself fully to mountaineering.

== Climbing career ==
He climbed the 14th and final summit of the eight thousanders on 9 October 2024. This was Shishapangma, 8,027 m (26,335 ft) high. He was the second French person to achieve this feat, the first person being Sophie Lavaud in 2023.

=== Eight-thousander ascents ===
- Lhotse, 8,516m - May 15, 2022
- Makalu, 8,481m - May 24, 2022
- Annapurna, 8,091m - April 15, 2023
- Mount Everest, 8,849m - May 16, 2023
- Kangchenjunga, 8,586m - June 1, 2023
- Nanga Parbat, 8,126m - July 2, 2023
- Gasherbrum II, 8,035m - July 17, 2023
- Gasherbrum I, 8,080m - July 21, 2023
- Broad Peak, 8,051m - July 25, 2023
- K2, 8,611m - July 28, 2023
- Manaslu, 8,153m - September 20, 2023
- Dhaulagiri, 8,167m - September 29, 2023
- Cho Oyu, 8,188m - June 7, 2024 (Opening of a new road)
- Shishapangma, 8,027m - October 9, 2024
