= Afsana =

Afsana may refer to:

- Afsana (name), a female given name
- Afsana (1951 film), a Bollywood film directed by Baldev Raj Chopra
- Afsana (1970 film), a Pakistani Urdu romantic drama film
- One Thousand and One Nights, short stories derived from "Hezār Afsān" (Persian: هزار افسان, lit. A Thousand Tales)
