= The Himalayan Database =

Elizabeth Hawley's climbing statistics

- Book cover of The Himalayan Database
- Author: Elizabeth Hawley, Richard Sailsbury
- Language: English
- Subject: Mountaineering
- Genre: Database
- Publisher: American Alpine Club
- Publication date: 1 October 2004
- Media type: Multimedia CD
- Pages: 80
- ISBN: 978-0-930410-99-5
- Website: The Himalayan Database

The Himalayan Database: The Expedition Archives of Elizabeth Hawley is a large digital and published record of mountaineering in the Nepalese Himalayas since 1903 (i.e. it does not include the Pakistan Himalaya peaks such as K2 and Nanga Parbat etc.), maintained by Richard Salisbury who digitised the records.

== Background ==
The Himalayan Database (HDB), was developed and maintained by Elizabeth Hawley, who remained involved up to her death in 2018. It was published as a CD and an 80-page paperback up until 2017. From 2017 onwards, records of expeditions, their members have been searchable online, or available as a complete downloadable database. It fills in for the absence of officially maintained records. It has been published by the American Alpine Club.

As well as being an important repository for climbing statistics on Himalayan mountains, the database also became known for its decisions to disregard or dispute various climbs. Notable cases was the decision not to record a 1990 ascent of Cho Oyu by British climber Alan Hinkes, which put a question-mark over Hinkes' claim to have summited all 14 eight-thousanders; and the 1997 ascent of Lhotse by Italian climbers Fausto De Stefani and Sergio Martini which forced Sergio Martini to reclimb Lhotse in 2000 to verify he had climbed all 14 eight-thousanders (De Stefani decided not to re-climb).

== Bibliography ==
- Salisbury, Richard; Hawley, Elizabeth (October 2004). The Himalayan Database: The Expedition Archives of Elizabeth Hawley. American Alpine Club. ISBN 978-0-930410-99-5.
- Salisbury, Richard; Hawley, Elizabeth (March 2012). The Himalaya by Numbers: A Statistical Analysis of Mountaineering in the Nepal Himalaya. Mountaineers Books. ISBN 978-9937-506-64-9.
- McDonald, Bernadette; Hillary, Sir Edmund (October 2012). Keeper of the Mountains. RMB. ISBN 978-1-927330-15-9.

== See also ==
- Eight-thousanders
- List of Mount Everest records
- Himalayan Index
