= Benoît Chamoux =

French mountain climber (1961–1995)

- Born: 15 February 1961; La Roche-sur-Foron, France
- Disappeared: 6 October 1995 (aged 34); Himalaya
- Status: Missing for 30 years, 8 months and 23 days

Benoît Chamoux (19 February 1961 – 6 October 1995) was a French Alpinist, who claimed to have summited 13 of the Eight-thousanders in the Himalayas.

Three of these climbs are disputed and are not formally recorded (Makalu in 1995, Cho Oyu in 1990 and Shishapangma in 1990). His official recorded number of ascents is 10.

== Biography ==
Chamoux was born in La Roche-sur-Foron near Mont Blanc in the department of Haute-Savoie, France. He disappeared near the summit of his 14th Himalayan peak, Kangchenjunga (8586m) on 5 October 1995 with photographer Pierre Royer and their Sherpa Riku. Three of his eight-thousander ascents were to either their fore-summits or the plateau, and are disputed.

The non-profit "Foundation Benoît Chamoux" was created under the auspices of the Foundation of France with the mission to educate Sherpa children who have lost their fathers in mountain expeditions.

== Principal achievements ==
- 1982: Diamond couloir on Mount Kenya
- 1983: Huascaran South in Peru

=== Solo ascents ===
- 1985: Gasherbrum II (8036m) on 15 June and Gasherbrum I (8068m) on 22 June.
- 1986: Broad Peak (8051m) at 16:00 on 20 June and K2 (8611m) arête des Abruzzes at 23:00 on 7 July in just 23 hours of climbing.
- 1987: Nanga Parbat (8126m) via Diamir at 23:00 on 7 July.

=== Expeditions leading the team l’Esprit d’Équipe ===
- 1988: Annapurna (8091m) via the South Face on 10 May. Five men of the six-man team reached the summit.
- 1989: Manaslu (8156m) via the South Face on 12 and 15 May. Everyone in the eight-man team reached the summit in four teams of two.
- 1990: Cho Oyu (8201m) on 30 April. Everyone in the seven-man team reached the summit (this ascent has been disputed by Elizabeth Hawley).
- 1990: Shishapangma (8013m) on 12 May. Everyone in the seven-man team reached the summit. (this was the central (west) summit and not the true summit, and is not recorded).

=== Scientific expeditions ===
- 1992: Measurement of Everest (8848m) on 29 September.
- 1993: Dhaulagiri (8167m) on 6 October.
- 1994: Lhotse (8516m).
- 1995: Makalu (8481m) on 7 May (this is disputed by Elizabeth Hawley and is not formally recorded).
- 1995: Disappeared on Kangchenjunga (8586m) with Pierre Royer and their Sherpa on 6 October near the summit.

== See also ==
- List of people who disappeared
