= Alina Pekova =

Russian mountaineer

Personal information
- Nationality: Russian
- Born: 8 January 1993 (age 33) Chegem II, Chegemsky District, Russia

Climbing career
- Major ascents: First Russian to climb all 14 eight-thousanders.

Alina Pekova (born 8 January 1993) is a Russian mountaineer, the first Russian to climb all 14 eight-thousanders.

== Early life ==
Born on January 8, 1993, in the village of Chegem Vtoroy (Kabardino-Balkaria). Since childhood, she practiced rhythmic gymnastics and tennis. She decided to take up mountaineering in 2017, when she climbed Mount Elbrus.

By education, she is a philologist, a graduate of Kabardino-Balkarian State University. She is fluent in English.

She began climbing eight-thousanders in commercial expeditions in April 2023. The first peak in this project, “14×8000,” was Annapurna (8,091 m) on April 16. Then, on May 18 of the same year, Pekova managed to climb Everest (8,848 m) and Lhotse (8,516 m) in a single day. These mountains are connected by the South Col (7,960 m). After descending from Everest, Pekova did not return to the base camp but proceeded directly to Lhotse via the South Col.

During 2023, that is, in less than six months, she managed to climb 11 of the highest peaks. Her last eight-thousander was Shishapangma (8,027 m), which she ascended on October 9, 2024. She completed climbing all fourteen eight-thousanders in a year and a half. Pekova had planned to achieve this within a year, but in the fall of 2023, during preparations for the ascent of Shishapangma, an avalanche claimed the lives of several climbers, and Chinese authorities closed the peak to expeditions. Among the deceased were Pekova's friends.

Pekova became the fourth woman in the world to achieve this feat. Before her, the best record among Russians was held by Sergey Bogomolov, who climbed 13 of the highest peaks on Earth.

In June 2025, after ascending Mount Kosciuszko, she completed the “Seven Summits” program and became the second Russian woman to complete the 14+7 challenge, just one and a half weeks after another commercial climber, Nicole Kovalchuk.

In her free time, she enjoys running and tennis. She also owns her own business.

== Chronology of ascents ==
- April 16, 2023 — Annapurna (8,091 m, Himalayas, Nepal)
- May 18, 2023 — Mount Everest (8,848 m, Himalayas, Nepal)
- May 18, 2023 — Lhotse (8,516 m, Himalayas, Nepal)
- May 29, 2023 — Makalu (8,485 m, Himalayas, Nepal)
- June 26, 2023 — Nanga Parbat (8,126 m, Himalayas, Pakistan)
- July 19, 2023 — Broad Peak (8,051 m, Karakoram, Pakistan)
- July 27, 2023 — K2 (8,611 m, Karakoram, Pakistan)
- August 2, 2023 — Gasherbrum I (8,080 m, Karakoram, Pakistan)
- September 20, 2023 — Manaslu (8,163 m, Himalayas, Nepal)
- September 29, 2023 — Dhaulagiri (8,167 m, Himalayas, Nepal)
- October 6, 2023 — Cho Oyu (8,201 m, Himalayas, Nepal)
- June 8, 2024 — Kangchenjunga (8,586 m, Himalayas, Nepal)
- July 21, 2024 — Gasherbrum II (8,035 m, Karakoram, Pakistan)
- October 9, 2024 — Shishapangma (8,027 m, Himalayas, Tibet, China)
