= Ferran Latorre =

Spanish mountaineer

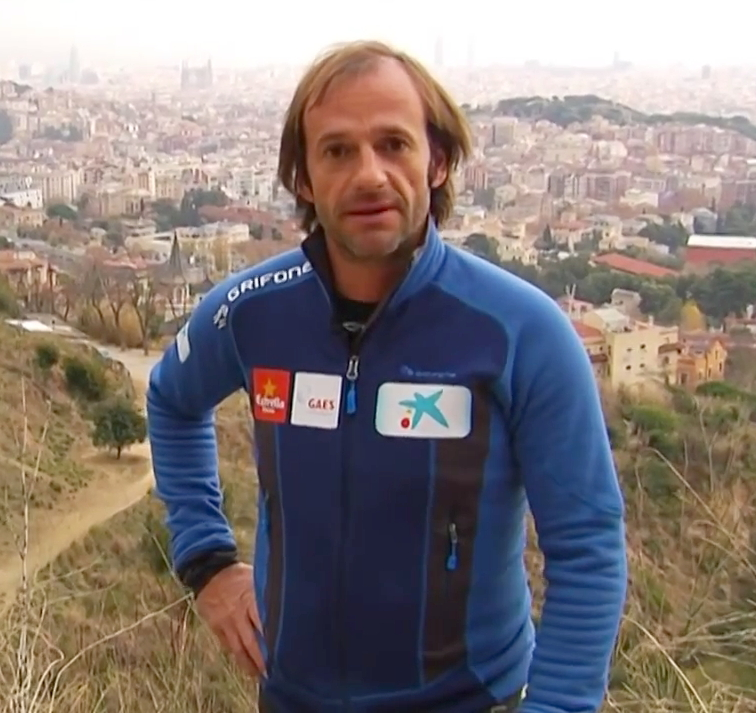
- Born: 18 October 1970 (age 55)
- Occupations: Mountaineer, adventurer
- Known for: First Catalan to ascend all 14 eight-thousanders
- Website: www.ferranlatorre.com

Ferran Latorre Torres (born 18 October 1970) is a Spanish mountaineer and adventurer who successfully summitted all 14 eight-thousanders.

== Biography ==
At the age of fourteen, he began training as a member of the Hiking Club of Catalonia, where he learned mountaineering and climbing. His fascination for climbing led him to the Pyrenees, the Alps, and the Himalayas. At the age of 21, he climbed Shishapangma.

Since 1998, Latorre has participated in the Spanish television program Al filo de lo impossible which documented his climbs in places such as Kyrgyzstan, Greenland, South George, Antarctica and the Himalayas. In 2017, he became the sixth Spanish mountaineer (and first Catalan) to ascend the 14 Eight-thousanders after climbing Mount Everest.
