= Nikol Algerdos Kovalchuk =

Russian-American mountaineer

Nikol Kovalchuk is a Russian–American mountaineer. In 2025, she completed the ascent of all 14 eight-thousander peaks, which are the world's highest mountains over 8,000 metres (26,247 ft).

On 6 June 2025, Kolvalchuk summited Denali, the final peak of the Seven Summits Challenge, which involves climbing the highest peaks on each of the seven continents.

Kovalchuk told reporters in 2026 that she is pursuing the 'True' Explorers Grand Slam, which consists of summiting all 14 of the world's 8,000m peaks, completing all Seven Summits (the highest peaks across each of the Seven Continents), and reaching the North and South Pole.

== Personal life ==
Kovalchuk is married to former National Hockey League (NHL) ice hockey player Ilya Kovalchuk.
