= Sanu Sherpa =

Nepalese mountaineer

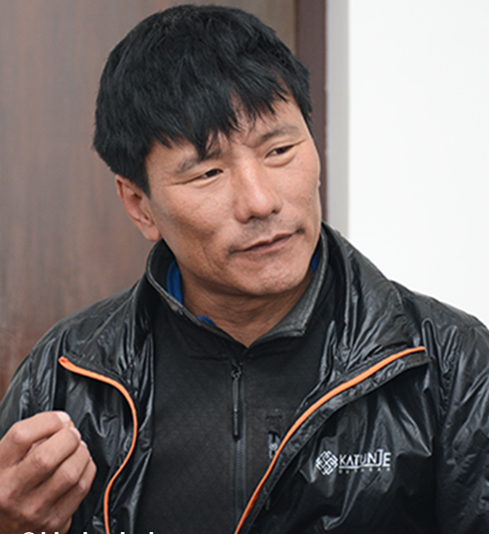
- Born: 1975 (age 50–51); Makalu, Sankhuwasabha, Nepal
- Known for: Mountaineering

Sanu Sherpa (born 1975) is a Nepalese mountaineer from Makalu, Sankhuwasabha. On 21 July 2022, he became the first person to climb all 14 of the eight-thousanders, twice. He made his first ascent of all the 14 eight-thousanders between 2006 and 2019, becoming the 42nd person ever to do so. Before starting climbing as a porter, Sanu was previously a herdsman in Sankhuwasabha District in his early life.

Sanu Sherpa lost his brother, Phurba Ongel Sherpa, during the descent from Makalu in January, 2026. While searching for his brother, his client chose to continue to descend and went missing.

== Eight-thousander ascents ==
- Annapurna – 2016, 2021, 2022
- Broad Peak – 2014, 2017
- Cho Oyu – 2006, 2008
- Dhaulagiri – 2019, 2021, 2022
- Everest – 2007, 2008, 2009, 2012, 2013, 2016, 2017
- Gasherbrum II – 2019, 2022
- Gasherbrum I – 2013, 2019, 2022
- K2 – 2012, 2021
- Kanchenjunga – 2014, 2022
- Lhotse – 2008, 2021, 2022
- Makalu – 2019, 2022, 2026
- Manaslu – 2010, 2011, 2016
- Nanga Parbat – 2017, 2018, 2022
- Shishapangma – 2006, 2011

== See also ==
- Nirmal Purja, a mountaineer with the record for the fastest ascent of all fourteen highest peaks.
