= Han Wang-yong =

South Korean mountaineer (born 1966)

- Born: Han Wang-yong; 1 September 1966 (age 59); Gunsan, South Korea
- Occupation: Mountaineer
- Known for: Third Korean to climb eight-thousanders

- Han Wang-yong
- Hangul: 한왕용
- Hanja: 韓王龍
- RR: Han Wangyong
- MR: Han Wangyong

Han Wang-Yong (born 1966) is a South Korean mountaineer. He has climbed the 14 tallest mountains in the world, collectively known as the eight-thousanders and the seven summits.

== Early life ==
Han was born in Okgu, Gunsan, Jeollabuk-do, the youngest son in a family of three sons and two daughters. He represented his middle school in football and his high school in baseball.

== Career ==
In 2003, he became the 11th person to climb the 14 highest mountains eight-thousanders, and the third Korean climber to do so (behind Um Hong-gil and Park Young-seok). He was also the first person to climb both the 14 eight-thousanders and the seven summits.

Since then he has led expeditions to clean rubbish left by other climbers from the slopes of K2 and Everest.
