= Elizabeth Hawley =

Journalist and chronicler of Nepal Himalayan expeditions

Elizabeth Ann Hawley
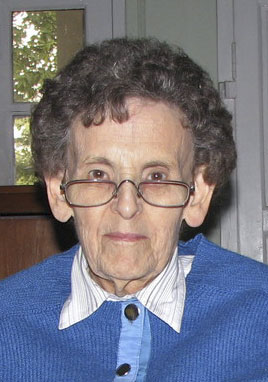
- Born: November 9, 1923; Chicago, Illinois
- Died: January 26, 2018 (aged 94); Kathmandu, Nepal
- Occupations: Journalist, Author
- Employer(s): Time Inc., Reuters
- Known for: The Himalayan Database
- Parents: Frank Hawley (father); Florelle Gore (mother)
- Awards: King Albert I Memorial Foundation Medal (1998); Queen's Service Medal (2004); Peak Hawley (2014)
- Website: The Himalayan Database:Elizabeth Hawley

Elizabeth Hawley (9 November 1923 – 26 January 2018) was an American journalist, author, and chronicler of Himalayan mountaineering expeditions. Hawley's The Himalayan Database became the unofficial record for climbs in the Nepalese Himalaya. She was also the honorary consul in Nepal for New Zealand.

== Early life ==
Hawley was born in Chicago, Illinois in 1923. She was educated at the University of Michigan and graduated with an honours degree in English in 1946. Having visited Kathmandu on a round-the-world trip in 1957, Hawley moved to Nepal full-time in 1959, giving up her job as a researcher for Fortune magazine in New York. In 1960 she started as a journalist and correspondent for Time, but later moved to the Reuters news agency in 1962. She covered the 1963 American Everest expedition that traversed Mount Everest. Her article on the death of the Nepalese prime minister made the front page of The New York Times. She socialized regularly with royalty and senior politicians in Nepal, on whom she reported for US media.

== Climbing database ==
While she never climbed a mountain herself, Hawley was the best-known chronicler of Nepalese Himalayan expeditions from the 1960s onwards (she did not chronicle expeditions to the Karakoram mountains such as K2), and was respected by the international mountaineering community because of the accuracy of her records, and the tenacity of her investigations; she was nicknamed "The Sherlock Holmes of the Mountaineering World". Italian climber Reinhold Messner told Outside, "If I need information about climbing 8,000-meter peaks, I go to her". Sir Edmund Hillary, one of her closest friends (she was an executive officer for Hillary's Himalayan Trust), once called her "a bit of a terror".

Hawley's detailed mountaineering records are summarized in The Himalayan Database, and have been used both as a record of successful ascents, and also of establishing success rates and fatality rates, for climbers in the Nepal Himalaya. Having a Himalayan ascent logged on Hawley's database became an essential requirement for mountaineers, which has led to many disputes, including:

1. Hawley ruled that the 1997 ascent of Lhotse by Italian climbers Sergio Martini and Fausto De Stefani was "disputed"; Martini reclimbed Lhotse in 2000 to officially become the seventh person to climb all 14 eight-thousanders, but De Stefani refused to reclimb Lhotse and his claim is therefore disputed.
2. In 2010, Hawley was called on to assess whether Korean climber Oh Eun-sun had become the first woman to complete all 14 eight-thousanders; she found that her claim was unlikely, based on the terrain of her summit photograph on Kangchenjunga. Oh would later concede to not having reached the true summit, and Spaniard Edurne Pasaban became the first woman to achieve the feat.
3. Hawley also saw Alan Hinkes's claim to be the first Briton to complete all 14 eight-thousanders removed from the record books by placing a "disputed" mark over his 1990 ascent of Cho Oyu. American climber Ed Viesturs re-climbed the true main summit of Shishapangma in his quest to climb all 14 eight-thousanders; Hawley's Himalayan Database would not accept ascents of Shishapangma's central (west) summit as full ascents of the mountain.

== Awards and honours ==
In 2008, French ice climber François Damilano named a peak in Nepal after Hawley, having made the solo first ascent of the 6,182 meter peak in the Dhaulagiri Group on 9 May 2008. In 2014, the Nepalese State officially confirmed the naming of Peak Hawley.

She was the honorary consul in Nepal for New Zealand for 20 years until her retirement in 2010, for which she received the Queen's Service Medal in 2004. She was also awarded the Swiss King Albert I Memorial Foundation Medal in 1998 for services to mountaineering, and was the first recipient of the Sagarmatha National Award from the Government of Nepal. The former American ambassador to Nepal, Peter Bodde, described Hawley as one of Nepal's "living treasures" and that "her contribution to the depth of knowledge and understanding between Nepal and the US was immense".

== Bibliography ==
- Salisbury, Richard; Hawley, Elizabeth (October 2004). The Himalayan Database: The Expedition Archives of Elizabeth Hawley. American Alpine Club. ISBN 978-0930410995.
- Bernadette McDonald (September 2005). I'll Call You in Kathmandu: The Elizabeth Hawley Story. Mountaineers Books. ISBN 978-0-89886-800-5.
- Salisbury, Richard; Hawley, Elizabeth (March 2012). The Himalaya by Numbers: A Statistical Analysis of Mountaineering in the Nepal Himalaya. Mountaineers Books. ISBN 978-9937506649.
- McDonald, Bernadette; Hillary, Sir Edmund (October 2012). Keeper of the Mountains. RMB. ISBN 978-1927330159.

== Filmography ==
- Allison Otto (Director) (2013). Keeper of the Mountains (DVD).

== See also ==
- Eight-thousanders
- The Himalayan Database
- Himalayan Trust
