= Afsana (name) =

Afsana, Afsane, or Afsaneh (Persian: افسانه, romanized: Afsāna, lit. 'tale, fable') is a feminine given name of Persian origin. Notable people with the name include:

== Given name ==
=== Afsana ===
- Afsana Ara Bindu (born 1988), Bangladeshi model
- Afsana Khan (born 1994), Indian playback singer
- Afsana Mimi (born 1968), Bangladeshi actress

=== Afsane ===
- Afsaneh Bayegan (born 1961), Iranian film and television actress and beauty pageant titleholder
- Afsaneh Mashayekhi Beschloss (born 1956), American economist and entrepreneur
- Afsaneh Chatrenoor (born 1998), Iranian footballer
- Afsane Hesamifard (born 1976), Iranian mountaineer and mountain medicine instructor
- Afsaneh Malek (1942–2026), Iranian singer
- Afsaneh Najmabadi (born 1946), Iranian-born American historian, gender theorist, archivist, and educator
- Afsaneh Naseri (born 1960), Iranian actress and radio narrator
- Afsaneh Rasaei, Persian vocalist
- Afsaneh Salari (born 1988), Iranian documentary filmmaker, editor, and producer
