= Afsane Hesamifard =

Iranian mountaineer (born 1976)

Personal information
- Nationality: Iranian
- Born: 1976 (age 49–50) Sabzevar, Iran

Climbing career
- Type of climber: High-altitude climbing
- Known for: First Iranian woman to climb all 14 eight-thousanders

Afsane Hesamifard (Persian: افسانه حسامی‌فرد) (born December 26, 1976, in Sabzevar, Iran) is an Iranian mountaineer and mountain medicine instructor.

== Life ==
She was born on December 26, 1976, in Sabzevar, Iran. She graduated from Mashhad University of Medical Sciences with a degree in general medicine.

== Climbing ==
She is the first Iranian woman to have climbed all 14 of the mountains above 8000 meters: Manaslu, Everest, K2, Broad Peak, Annapurna I; Lhotse, Gasherbrum I, Gasherbrum II, Nanga Parbat, Makalu, Shishapangma, Dhaulagiri, Kangchenjunga and Cho Oyu.

=== Notable ascents ===
- 2019- Lenin Peak
- 2019- Imja Tse
- 2019- Kala Patthar
- 2021- Manaslu
- 2022- Ararat
- 2022- K2
- 2022- Broad Peak
- 2023- Annapurna I
- 2023- Lhotse
- 2023- Gasherbrum I
- 2023- Gasherbrum II
- 2024- Nanga Parbat
- 2024- Makalu
- 2024- Shishapangma
- 2025- Dhaulagiri
- 2025 Kangchenjunga
- 2025 Cho Oyu
