= Eight-thousander =

Mountain peaks of over 8,000 metres in elevation

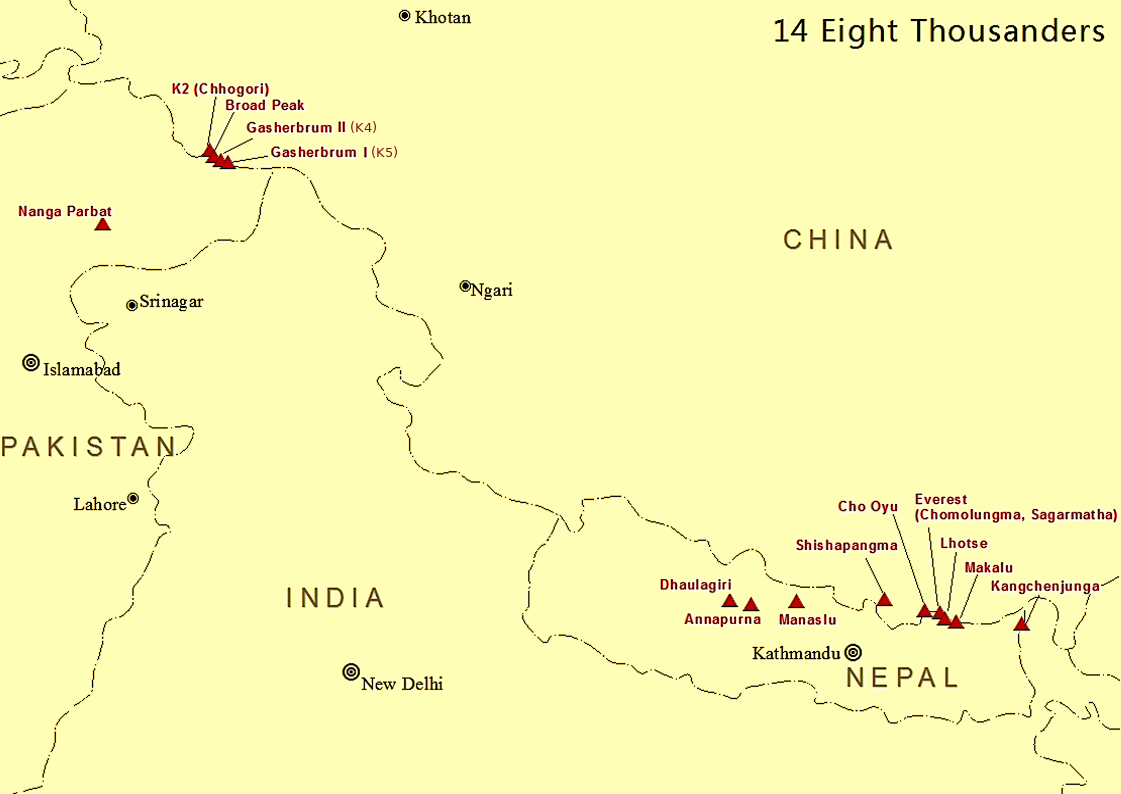
Locations of the world's 14 eight-thousanders, which are split between the Himalayan (right, including Nanga Parbat, left), and the Karakoram mountain ranges (left)

The eight-thousanders are 14 mountains recognised by the International Mountaineering and Climbing Federation (UIAA) with summits that exceed 8,000 metres (26,247 ft) in elevation above sea level and are sufficiently independent of neighbouring peaks as measured by topographic prominence. There is no formally agreed-upon definition of prominence, however, and at times the UIAA has considered whether the list of 8,000-metre peaks should be expanded to 20 peaks by including the major satellite peaks of the canonical 14 eight-thousanders. All of the Earth's eight-thousanders are located in the Himalayan and Karakoram mountain ranges in Asia, and their summits lie in the altitude range known as the death zone, where atmospheric oxygen pressure is insufficient to sustain human life for extended periods of time.

From 1950 to 1964, all 14 of the eight-thousanders were first summited by expedition climbers in the summer season (the first to be summited was Annapurna I in 1950, and the last was Shishapangma in 1964); from 1980 to 2021, all 14 were summited in the winter season (the first to be summited in winter was Mount Everest in 1980, and the last was K2 in 2021). As measured by a variety of statistical techniques, the deadliest eight-thousander is Annapurna I, with one death (of a climber or climbing-support member) for every three summiteers, followed by K2 and Nanga Parbat (each with one death for every four to five summiteers), and then Dhaulagiri and Kangchenjunga (each with one death for every six to seven summiteers).

The first person to summit all 14 eight-thousanders was the Italian climber Reinhold Messner in 1986, who did not use any supplementary oxygen. In 2010, Edurne Pasaban, a Basque Spanish mountaineer, became the first woman to summit all 14 eight-thousanders, though with the aid of supplementary oxygen. In 2011, Austrian Gerlinde Kaltenbrunner became the first woman to summit all 14 eight-thousanders without the aid of supplementary oxygen. In 2013, South Korean Kim Chang-ho set a speed record by climbing all 14 eight-thousanders in 7 years and 310 days, without the aid of supplementary oxygen. In July 2023, Kristin Harila and Tenjen Lama Sherpa set a speed record of 92 days for climbing all 14 eight-thousanders, with supplementary oxygen. In July 2022, Sanu Sherpa became the first person to summit all 14 eight-thousanders twice, which he achieved from 2006 to 2022.

== Climbing history ==
=== First ascents ===
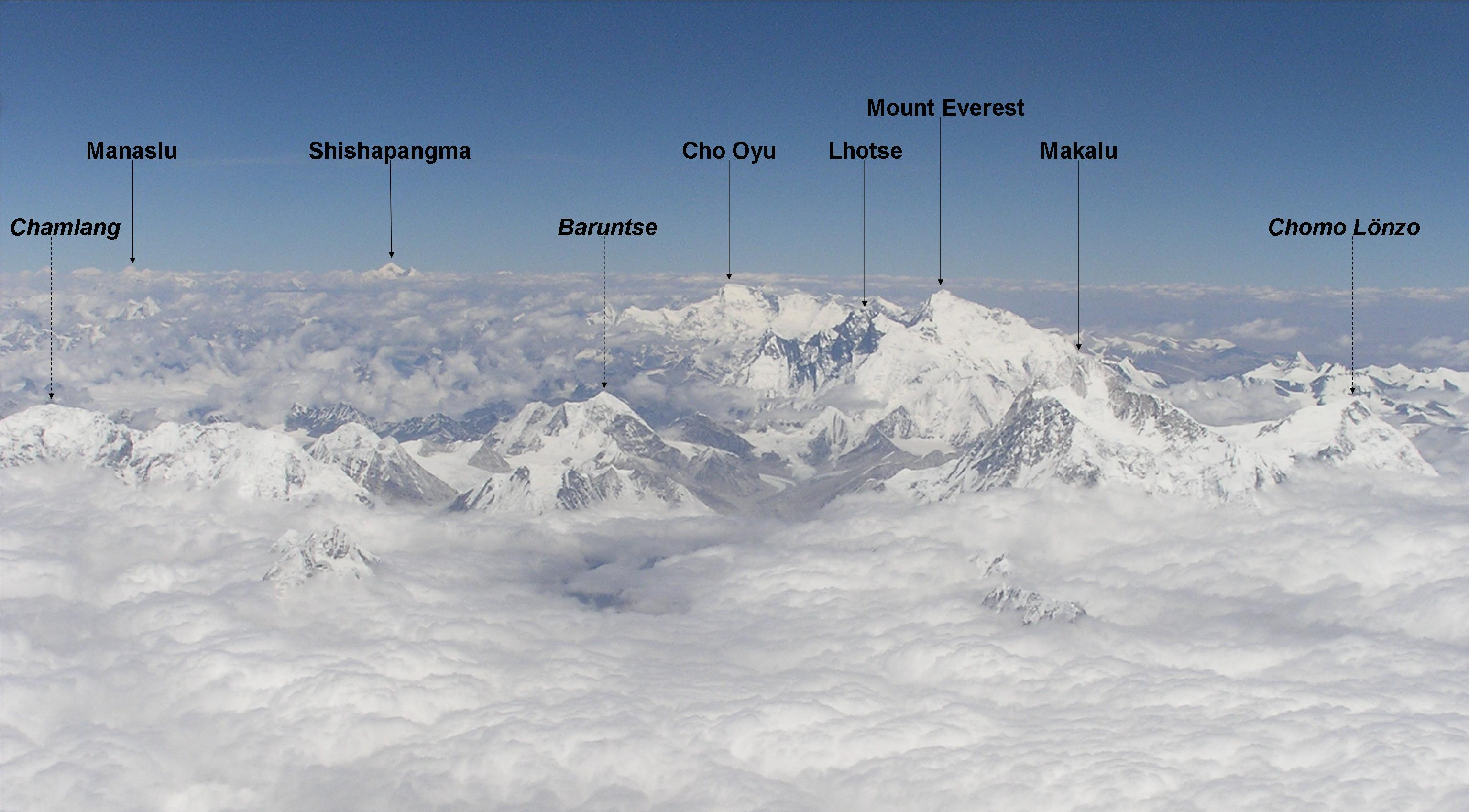
Flight over the Khumbu region; six eight-thousanders are visible

The first recorded attempt on an eight-thousander occurred when Albert F. Mummery, Geoffrey Hastings and J. Norman Collie tried to climb Nanga Parbat in 1895. The attempt failed when Mummery and two Gurkhas, Ragobir Thapa and Goman Singh, died in an avalanche.

The first successful ascent of an eight-thousander was by the French climbers Maurice Herzog and Louis Lachenal, who reached the summit of Annapurna on 3 June 1950 using expedition climbing techniques as part of the 1950 French Annapurna expedition. Due to its location in Tibet, Shishapangma was the last eight-thousander to be ascended for the first time; a Chinese team led by Xu Jing completed the ascent in 1964 (Tibet's mountains were closed by China to foreigners until 1978).

The first winter ascent of an eight-thousander was by a Polish team led by Andrzej Zawada on Mount Everest, with Leszek Cichy and Krzysztof Wielicki reaching the summit on 17 February 1980; all-Polish teams would complete nine of the first fourteen winter ascents of eight-thousanders. The final eight-thousander to be climbed in winter was K2, whose summit was ascended by a 10-person Nepalese team on 16 January 2021.

Only two climbers have completed the first ascent of more than one eight-thousander: Hermann Buhl (Nanga Parbat and Broad Peak, in 1953 and 1957) and Kurt Diemberger (Broad Peak and Dhaulagiri, in 1957 and 1960). Buhl's summit of Nanga Parbat in 1953 is notable as being the only solo first-ascent of an eight-thousander. The Polish climber Jerzy Kukuczka is noted for creating over ten new routes on various eight-thousander mountains. Italian climber Simone Moro made the first winter ascent of four eight-thousanders (Shishapangma, Makalu, Gasherbrum II, and Nanga Parbat), while three Polish climbers have each made three first winter ascents of an eight-thousander, Maciej Berbeka (Cho Oyu, Manaslu, and Broad Peak), Krzysztof Wielicki (Everest, Kangchenjunga, and Lhotse) and Jerzy Kukuczka (Dhaulagiri I, Kangchenjunga, and Annapurna I).

=== All 14 ===
Comparison of the heights of the Eight-thousanders (red triangles) with the Seven Summits and Seven Second Summits

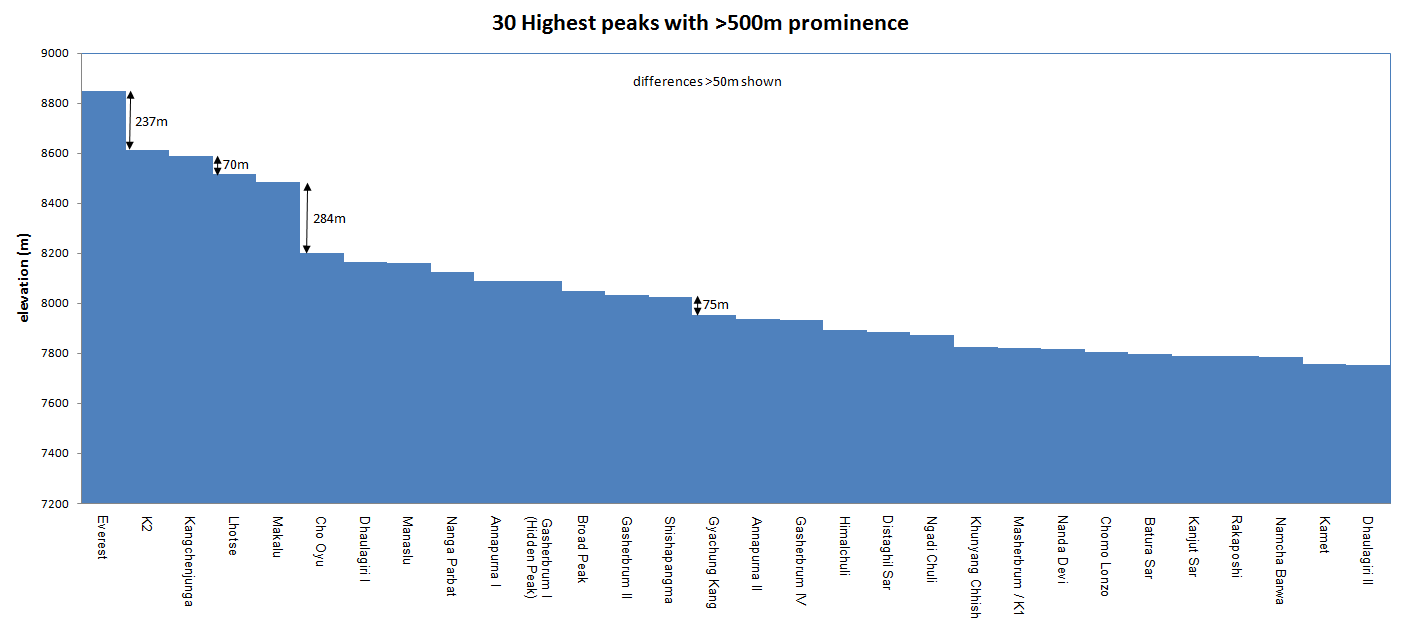
The 30–highest peaks in the world with over 500 m (1,640 ft) in prominence

On 16 October 1986, Italian Reinhold Messner became the first person to climb all 14 eight-thousanders. In 1987, Polish climber Jerzy Kukuczka became the second person to accomplish this feat. Messner summited each of the 14 peaks without the aid of bottled oxygen, a feat that was only repeated by the Swiss Erhard Loretan nine years later in 1995 (Kukuczka had used supplementary oxygen while summiting Everest but on no other eight-thousander).

On 17 May 2010, Spanish climber Edurne Pasaban became the first woman to summit all 14 eight-thousanders. In August 2011, Austrian climber Gerlinde Kaltenbrunner became the first woman to climb the 14 eight-thousanders without the use of supplementary oxygen.

The first couple and team to summit all 14 eight-thousanders were the Italians Nives Meroi (who was the second woman to accomplish this feat without supplementary oxygen), and her husband Romano Benet on 11 May 2017. The couple climbed alpine style, without the use of supplementary oxygen or other support.

On 22 May 2024, Nepali guide Kami Rita summited Everest for the 30th time (a record for Everest), also becoming the first-ever person to climb an eight-thousander 41 times. In July 2022, Sanu Sherpa became the first person to summit all 14 eight-thousanders twice. He started with Cho Oyu in 2006, and completed the double by summiting Gasherbrum II in July 2022.

On 20 May 2013, South Korean climber Kim Chang-ho set a new speed record of climbing all 14 eight-thousanders, without the use of supplementary oxygen, in 7 years and 310 days. On 29 October 2019, the British-Nepali climber Nirmal Purja set a speed record of 6 months and 6 days for climbing all 14 eight-thousanders with the use of supplementary oxygen. On 27 July 2023, Kristin Harila and Tenjen Lama Sherpa set a new speed record of 92 days for climbing all 14 eight-thousanders with supplementary oxygen.

=== Deadliest ===
Estimated sample death rates for the 14 eight-thousanders
Eight thousander	From 1950 to March 2012			Climber death rate (Note: Per The Himalayan Database (HDB) tables, the Climber (or Member) Death Rate is the ratio of deaths above base camp, of all climbers who were hoping to summit and who went above base camp, for 1950 to 2009, and is closer to a true probability of death; the data is only for Nepalese Himalaya. Summary tables from the HDB report for all mountains above 8,000 metres, imply that the death rate for the period 1990 to 2009 (e.g. modern expeditions), is roughly half that of the combined 1950 to 2009 period.)
Eight thousander	Total ascents (Note: As recorded by Eberhard Jurgalski)	Total deaths (Note: As recorded by Eberhard Jurgalski and being any death (climber or other) above Base Camp.)	Deaths as % of ascents (Note: This should not be mistaken as being a death rate; it does not imply a probability of death for a climber attempting to climb an eight-thousander as it includes all deaths from all activities undertaken above base camp (e.g. training or reconnaissance trips, camp stocking activities by porters who will not be summiting the mountain, rescue attempts etc.). Thus it compares deaths from the larger group of people who were, and were not, making a summit attempt, with the smaller group who were making a summit attempt. While it is not a probability, the statistic does reflect the ratio of people who died above base camp for each climber who summited.)	Climber death rate
Everest	5656	223	3.9%	1.52%
K2	800	96	12%	– (Note: Data is not available for the Karakoram Himalayas)
Kangchenjunga	243	40	16%	3.00%
Lhotse	461	13	2.8%	1.03%
Makalu	361	31	8.6%	1.63%
Cho Oyu	3138	44	1.4%	0.64%
Dhaulagiri I	448	69	15.4%	2.94%
Manaslu	661	65	9.8%	2.77%
Nanga Parbat	335	68	20.3%	–
Annapurna I	191	61	31.9%	4.05%
Gasherbrum I (Hidden Peak)	334	29	8.7%	–
Broad Peak	404	21	5.2%	–
Gasherbrum II	930	21	2.3%	–
Shishapangma	302	25	8.3%	

The eight-thousanders are some of the world's deadliest mountains. The extreme altitude and the fact that the summits of all eight-thousanders lie in the Death Zone mean that climber mortality (or death rate) is high. Two metrics are quoted to establish a death rate (i.e. broad and narrow) that are used to rank the eight-thousanders in order of deadliest.

- Broad death rate: The first metric is the ratio of total deaths on the mountain to successful climbers summiting over a given period. The Guinness Book of World Records uses this metric to name Annapurna I as the deadliest eight-thousander, and the world's deadliest mountain with roughly one person dying for every three people who successfully summit, i.e. a ratio of circa 30%. Using consistent data from 1950 to 2012, mountaineering statistician Eberhard Jurgalski (see table) used this metric to show Annapurna is the deadliest mountain (31.9%), followed by K2 (26.5%), Nanga Parbat (20.3%), Dhaulagiri (15.4%) and Kangchenjunga (14.1%). Other statistical sources including MountainIQ, used a mix of data periods from 1900 to Spring 2021 but had similar results showing Annapurna still being the deadliest mountain (27.2%), followed by K2 (22.8%), Nanga Parbat (20.75%), Kangchenjunga (15%), and Dhaulagiri (13.5%). Cho Oyu was the safest at 1.4%.
- Narrow death rate: The drawback of the first metric is that it includes the deaths of any support climbers or climbing sherpas that went above base camp in assisting the climb; therefore, rather than being the probability that a climber will die attempting to summit an eight-thousander, it is more akin to the total human cost in getting a climber to the summit. In the Himalayan Database (HDB) tables, the climber (or member) "Death Rate" is the ratio of deaths above base camp, of all climbers who were hoping to summit and who went above base camp (calculated for 1950 to 2009), and is closer to a true probability of death (see table below). The data is only for the Nepalese Himalaya and therefore does not include K2 or Nanga Parbat. HDB estimates the probability of death for a climber attempting the summit of an eight-thousander is still highest for Annapurna I (4%), followed by Kangchenjunga (3%) and Dhaulagiri (3%); the safest is still Cho Oyu at 0.6%.

The tables from the HDB for eight-thousanders also show that the death rate of climbers for the period 1990 to 2009 (e.g. modern expeditions), is roughly half that of the combined 1950 to 2009 period, i.e. climbing is becoming safer for the climbers attempting the summit.

== List of first ascents ==
From 1950 to 1964, all 14 of the eight-thousanders were summited in the summer (the first was Annapurna I in 1950, and the last was Shishapangma in 1964), and from 1980 to 2021, all 14 were summited in the winter (the first being Everest in 1980, and the last being K2 in 2021).

First ascent and first winter ascent for each of the 14 eight-thousanders
Mountain				First ascent		First winter ascent	
Name	Height	Prom.	Country	Date	Summiteer(s)	Date	Summiteer(s)
Everest	8,849 m (29,032 ft)	8,849 m (29,032 ft)	Nepal; China	29 May 1953 (Note: It remains unclear whether George Mallory and Andrew Irvine reached the summit in 1924 or not. For more details, see 1924 British Mount Everest expedition.)	(New Zealand) Edmund Hillary (India) (Nepal) Tenzing Norgay on British expedition	17 February 1980	(Poland) Krzysztof Wielicki (Poland) Leszek Cichy
K2	8,611 m (28,251 ft)	4,020 m (13,190 ft)	Pakistan; China	31 July 1954	(Italy) Achille Compagnoni (Italy) Lino Lacedelli on Italian expedition	16 January 2021	(Nepal) (United Kingdom) Nirmal Purja (Nepal) Gelje Sherpa (Nepal) Mingma David Sherpa (Nepal) Mingma Gyalje Sherpa (Nepal) Sona Sherpa (Nepal) Mingma Tenzi Sherpa (Nepal) Pem Chhiri Sherpa (Nepal) Dawa Temba Sherpa (Nepal) Kili Pemba Sherpa (Nepal) Dawa Tenjing Sherpa
Kangchenjunga	8,586 m (28,169 ft)	3,922 m (12,867 ft)	Nepal; India	25 May 1955	(United Kingdom) George Band (United Kingdom) Joe Brown on British expedition	11 January 1986	(Poland) Krzysztof Wielicki (Poland) Jerzy Kukuczka
Lhotse	8,516 m (27,940 ft)	610 m (2,000 ft)	Nepal; China	18 May 1956	(Switzerland) Fritz Luchsinger (Switzerland) Ernst Reiss	31 December 1988	(Poland) Krzysztof Wielicki
Makalu	8,485 m (27,838 ft)	2,378 m (7,802 ft)	Nepal; China	15 May 1955	(France) Jean Couzy (France) Lionel Terray on French expedition	9 February 2009	(Italy) Simone Moro (Kazakhstan) Denis Urubko
Cho Oyu	8,188 m (26,864 ft)	2,344 m (7,690 ft)	Nepal; China	19 October 1954	(Austria) Joseph Joechler (Nepal) Pasang Dawa Lama (Austria) Herbert Tichy	12 February 1985	(Poland) Maciej Berbeka (Poland) Maciej Pawlikowski
Dhaulagiri I	8,167 m (26,795 ft)	3,357 m (11,014 ft)	Nepal	13 May 1960	(Austria) Kurt Diemberger (West Germany) Peter Diener (Nepal) Nawang Dorje (Nepal) Nima Dorje (Switzerland) Ernst Forrer (Switzerland) Albin Schelbert	21 January 1985	(Poland) Andrzej Czok (Poland) Jerzy Kukuczka
Manaslu	8,163 m (26,781 ft)	3,092 m (10,144 ft)	Nepal	9 May 1956	(Japan) Toshio Imanishi (Nepal) Gyalzen Norbu	12 January 1984	(Poland) Maciej Berbeka (Poland) Ryszard Gajewski
Nanga Parbat	8,125 m (26,657 ft)	4,608 m (15,118 ft)	Pakistan	3 July 1953	(Austria) Hermann Buhl on German–Austrian expedition	26 February 2016	(Pakistan) Muhammad Ali Sadpara (Italy) Simone Moro (Spain) Alex Txikon
Annapurna I	8,091 m (26,545 ft)	2,984 m (9,790 ft)	Nepal	3 June 1950	(France) Maurice Herzog (France) Louis Lachenal on French expedition	3 February 1987	(Poland) Jerzy Kukuczka (Poland) Artur Hajzer
Gasherbrum I (Hidden Peak)	8,080 m (26,510 ft)	2,155 m (7,070 ft)	Pakistan; China	5 July 1958	(United States) Andrew Kauffman (United States) Pete Schoening	9 March 2012	(Poland) Adam Bielecki (Poland) Janusz Gołąb
Broad Peak	8,051 m (26,414 ft)	1,701 m (5,581 ft)	Pakistan; China	9 June 1957	(Austria) Fritz Wintersteller (Austria) Marcus Schmuck (Austria) Kurt Diemberger (Austria) Hermann Buhl	5 March 2013	(Poland) Maciej Berbeka (Poland) Adam Bielecki (Poland) Tomasz Kowalski (Poland) Artur Małek
Gasherbrum II	8,034 m (26,358 ft)	1,524 m (5,000 ft)	Pakistan; China	7 July 1956	(Austria) Fritz Moravec (Austria) Josef Larch (Austria) Hans Willenpart	2 February 2011	(Italy) Simone Moro (Kazakhstan) Denis Urubko (United States) Cory Richards
Shishapangma	8,027 m (26,335 ft)	2,897 m (9,505 ft)	China	2 May 1964	(China) Xu Jing (China) Chang Chun-yen (China) Wang Fuzhou (China) Chen San (China) Cheng Tien-liang (China) Wu Tsung-yue (China) Sodnam Doji (China) Migmar Trashi (China) Doji (China) Yonten	14 January 2005	(Poland) Piotr Morawski (Italy) Simone Moro

== List of climbers of all 14 ==
First to climb all 14 eight-thousanders

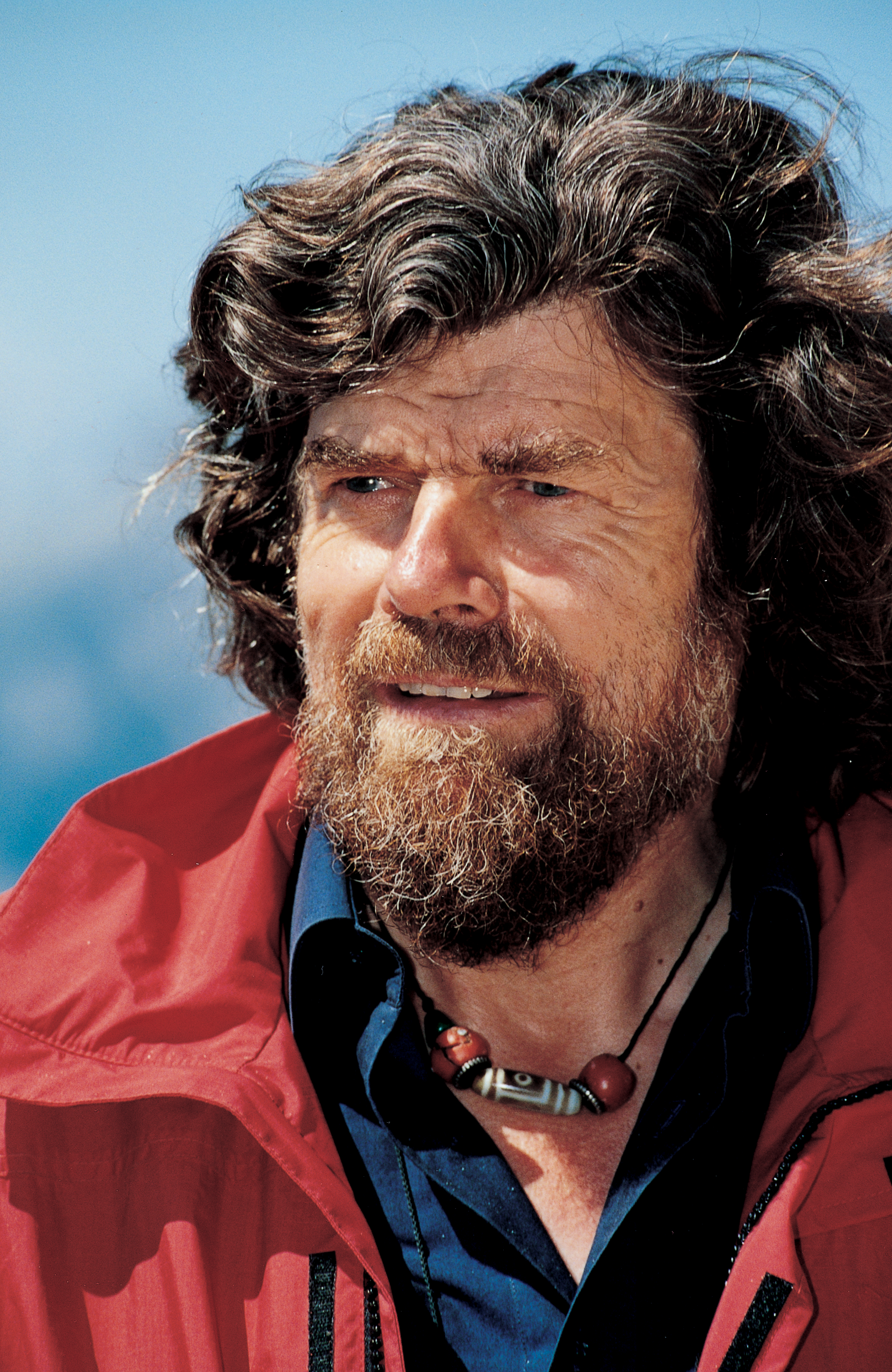
Reinhold Messner, first to climb all 14, and without oxygen

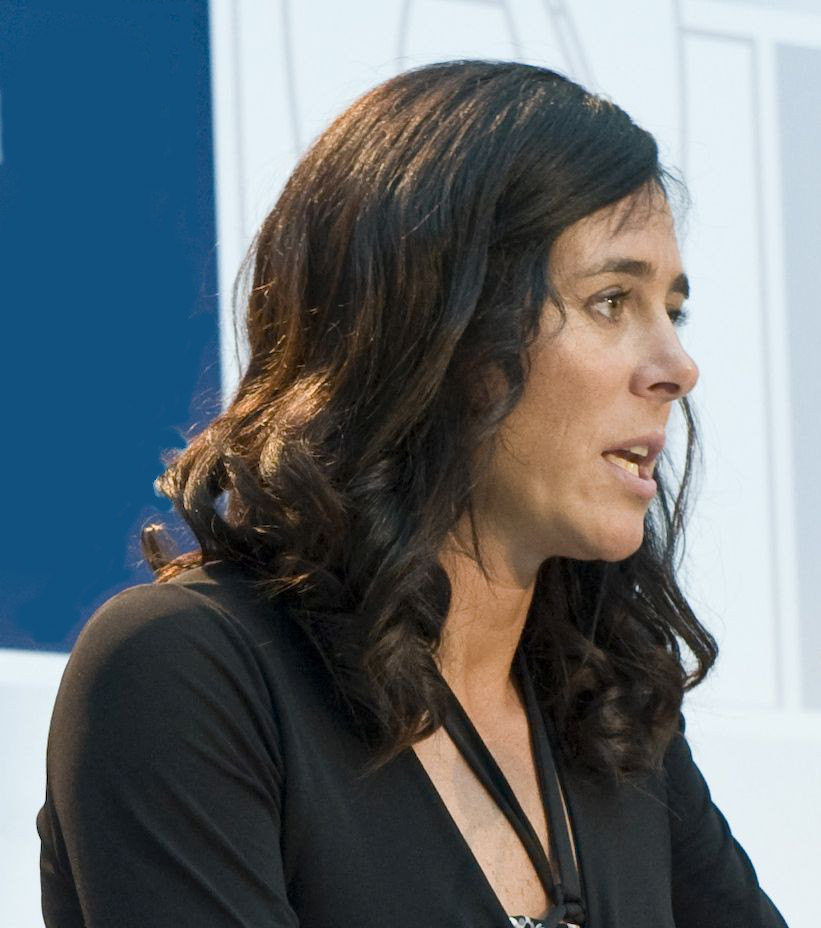
Edurne Pasaban, the first woman to climb all 14 after Oh Eun-sun's claim was disputed

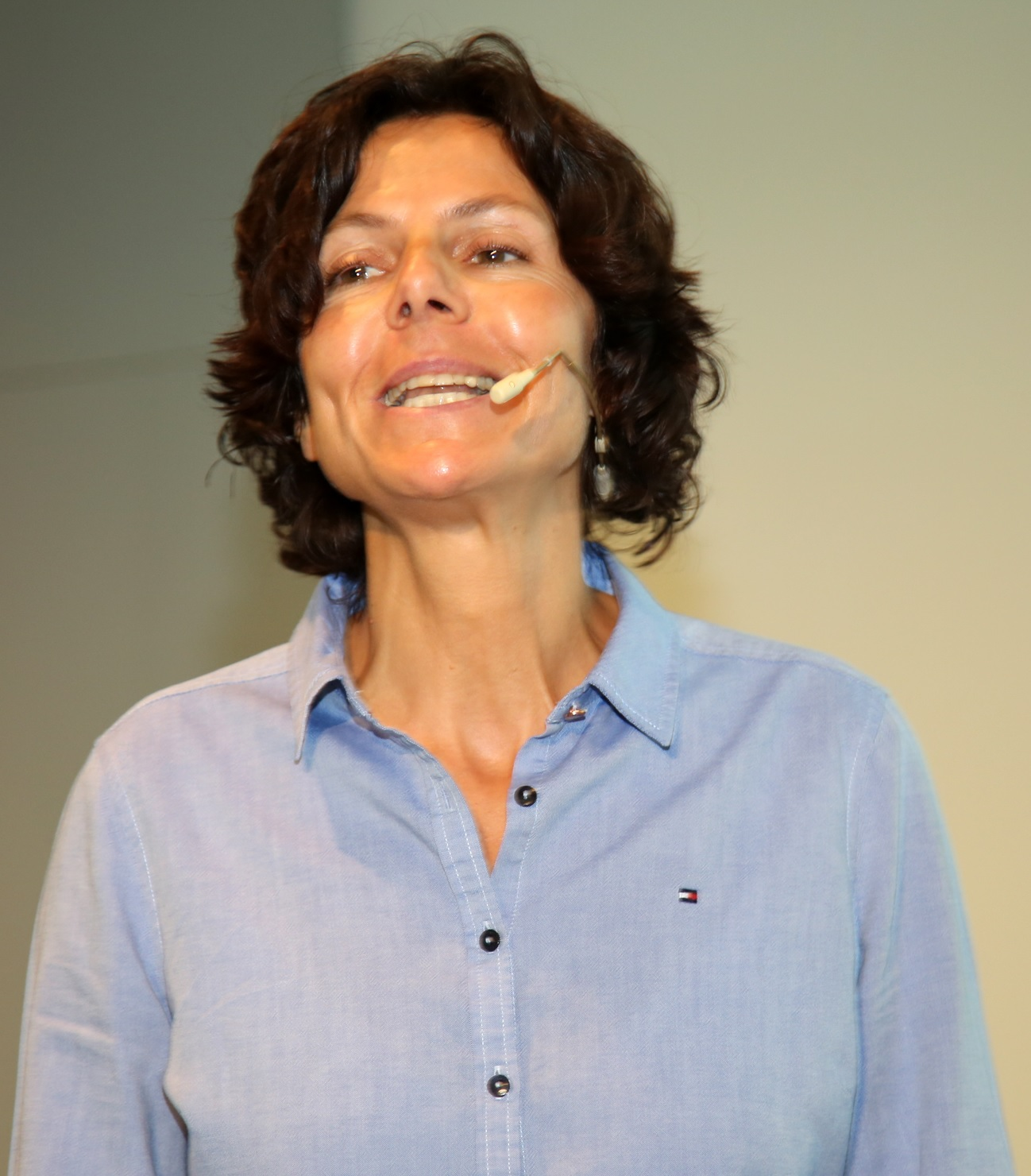
Gerlinde Kaltenbrunner, the first woman to climb all 14 without oxygen

There is no single undisputed source or arbitrator for verified ascents of Himalayan eight-thousander peaks.

Various mountaineering journals, including the Alpine Journal and the American Alpine Journal, also maintain extensive records and archives on expeditions to the eight-thousanders, but do not always opine on disputed ascents, and nor do they maintain registers or lists of verified ascents of the eight-thousanders.

Elizabeth Hawley's The Himalayan Database, is considered as an important source for verified ascents for the Nepalese Himalayas. Online databases of Himalayan ascents pay close regard to The Himalayan Database, including the website AdventureStats.com, and the Eberhard Jurgalski List.

=== Verified ascents ===
First person to summit all 14 eight-thousanders, and first to do so without supplementary oxygen
First female to summit all 14 eight-thousanders; with supplementary oxygen
First female to summit all 14 eight-thousanders; no supplementary oxygen (legacy)
Fastest ascent of all 14 eight-thousanders; with supplementary oxygen
Fastest ascent of all 14 eight-thousanders; no supplementary oxygen
Youngest person to climb all 14 eight-thousanders
First disabled person to have summited all 14 eight-thousanders

The "No O_{2}" column lists people who have climbed all 14 eight-thousanders without supplementary oxygen.

List of climbers who have summited all 14 eight-thousanders
Order	Order (No O_{2})	Name	Period climbing eight-thousanders	Born	Age	Nationality
1	1	Reinhold Messner	1970–1986	1944	42	(Italy) Italian
2		Jerzy Kukuczka	1979–1987	1948	39	(Poland) Polish
3	2	Erhard Loretan	1982–1995	1959	36	(Switzerland) Swiss
4		Carlos Carsolio	1985–1996	1962	33	(Mexico) Mexican
5		Krzysztof Wielicki	1980–1996	1950	46	(Poland) Polish
6	3	Juanito Oiarzabal	1985–1999	1956	43	(Spain) Spanish
7		Sergio Martini	1983–2000	1949	51	(Italy) Italian
8		Park Young-seok	1993–2001	1963	38	(South Korea) Korean
9		Um Hong-gil	1988–2001	1960	40	(South Korea) Korean
10	4	Alberto Iñurrategi	1991–2002	1968	33	(Spain) Spanish
11		Han Wang-yong	1994–2003	1966	37	(South Korea) Korean
12	5	Ed Viesturs	1989–2005	1959	46	(United States) American
13	6	Silvio Mondinelli	1993–2007	1958	49	(Italy) Italian
14	7	Iván Vallejo	1997–2008	1959	49	(Ecuador) Ecuadorian
15	8	Denis Urubko	2000–2009	1973	35	(Kazakhstan) Kazakhstani
16		Ralf Dujmovits	1990–2009	1961	47	(Germany) German
17	9	Veikka Gustafsson	1993–2009	1968	41	(Finland) Finnish
18		Andrew Lock	1993–2009	1961	48	(Australia) Australian
19	10	João Garcia	1993–2010	1967	43	(Portugal) Portuguese
20		Piotr Pustelnik	1990–2010	1951	58	(Poland) Polish
21		Edurne Pasaban	2001–2010	1973	36	(Spain) Spanish
22		Abele Blanc	1992–2011	1954	56	(Italy) Italian
23		Mingma Sherpa	2000–2011	1978	33	(Nepal) Nepali
24	11	Gerlinde Kaltenbrunner	1998–2011	1970	40	(Austria) Austrian
25		Vassily Pivtsov	2001–2011	1975	36	(Kazakhstan) Kazakhstani
26	12	Maxut Zhumayev	2001–2011	1977	34	(Kazakhstan) Kazakhstani
27		Kim Jae-soo	2000–2011	1961	50	(South Korea) Korean
28	13	Mario Panzeri	1988–2012	1964	48	(Italy) Italian
29		Hirotaka Takeuchi [ja]	1995–2012	1971	41	(Japan) Japanese
30		Chhang Dawa Sherpa	2001–2013	1982	30	(Nepal) Nepali
31	14	Kim Chang-ho	2005–2013	1970	43	(South Korea) Korean
32		Jorge Egocheaga	2002–2014	1968	45	(Spain) Spanish
33	15	Radek Jaroš	1998–2014	1964	50	(Czech Republic) Czech
34/35	16/17	Nives Meroi	1998–2017	1961	55	(Italy) Italian
34/35	16/17	Romano Benet	1998–2017	1962	55	(Italy) Italian / (Slovenia) Slovenian
36		Peter Hámor	1998–2017	1964	52	(Slovakia) Slovak
37	18	Azim Gheychisaz	2008–2017	1981	37	(Iran) Iranian
38		Ferran Latorre	1999–2017	1970	46	(Spain) Spanish
39	19	Òscar Cadiach	1984–2017	1952	64	(Spain) Spanish
40		Kim Mi-gon	2000–2018	1973	45	(South Korea) Korean
41		Sanu Sherpa	2006–2019	1975	44	(Nepal) Nepali
42	22	Nirmal Purja	2014–2019 (Note: Nirmal Purja climbed all fourteen 8,000m peaks between April 2019 and October 2019, but climbed his first, Dhaulagiri, in 2014.)	1983	36	(United Kingdom) British
43		Mingma Gyabu Sherpa	2010–2019	1989	30	(Nepal) Nepali
44		Kim Hong-bin	2006–2021	1964	57	(South Korea) Korean
45		Nima Gyalzen Sherpa	2004–2022	1985	37	(Nepal) Nepali
46		Dong Hong Juan	2015–2023	1981	42	(China) Chinese
47		Kristin Harila	2021–2023	1986	37	(Norway) Norwegian
48		Sophie Lavaud	2012–2023	1968	55	(Switzerland) Swiss / (France) French / (Canada) Canadian
49		Tunç Fındık	2001–2023	1972	51	(Turkey) Turkish
50		Tenjen Lama Sherpa	2016–2023		35	(Nepal) Nepali
51		Gelje Sherpa	2017–2023	1992	30	(Nepal) Nepali
52		Chris Warner	1999–2023	1965	58	(United States) American
53	20	Marco Camandona	2000–2024	1970	54	(Italy) Italian
54		Naoki Ishikawa	2001–4 October 2024	1977	47	(Japan) Japanese
54		Tracee Metcalfe	2016–4 October 2024		50	(United States) American
54	21	Sirbaz Khan	2017–4 October 2024	1987	37	(Pakistan) Pakistani
54		Dawa Gyalje Sherpa	?–4 October 2024			(Nepal) Nepali
54	22	Mingma Gyalje Sherpa	2006–4 October 2024	1986	38	(Nepal) Nepali
59		Tejan Gurung	2022-9 October 2024	1995	29	(Nepal) Nepali / (United Kingdom) British
59	23	Mario Vielmo	1998–9 October 2024	1964	60	(Italy) Italian
59		Naoko Watanabe [ja]	2006–9 October 2024	1981	42	(Japan) Japanese
59		Adrian Laza	2016–9 October 2024	1963	60	(Romania) Romanian
59		Pasang Nurbu Sherpa	2016-9 October 2024			(Nepal) Nepali
59		Shehroze Kashif	2019–9 October 2024	2002	22	(Pakistan) Pakistani
59		Dorota Rasińska-Samoćko	2021–9 October 2024			(Poland) Polish
59		Adriana Brownlee	2021–9 October 2024	2001	23	(United Kingdom) British
59		Nima Rinji Sherpa	2022–9 October 2024	2006	18	(Nepal) Nepali
59		Alasdair McKenzie	2022–9 October 2024	2004	20	(France) French / (United Kingdom) British
59		Alina Pekova	2023–9 October 2024	1993	31	(Russia) Russian
59		Ko-Erh Tseng	?–9 October 2024			(Taiwan) Taiwanese
59		Ming Temba Sherpa	2013-9 October 2024			(Nepal) Nepali
59		Pasang Tendi Sherpa	2011-9 October 2024			(Nepal) Nepali
73		Uta Ibrahimi	2017-11 May 2025	1983	42	Kosovo
74		Nikol Algerdos Kovalchuk	2023-19 May 2025	1983	42	(Russia) Russian
75		Saško Kedev	2009-July 2025	1962	63	North Macedonia
76		Afsane Hesamifard	2021-14 October 2025	1976	49	(Iran) Iranian
76		Chhiring Sherpa	?-14 October 2025			(Nepal) Nepali

=== Disputed ascents ===
Claims have been made for summiting all 14 peaks for which not enough evidence was provided to verify the ascent; the disputed ascent in each claim is shown in parentheses in the table below. In most cases, the Himalayan chronicler Elizabeth Hawley is considered a definitive source regarding the facts of the dispute. Her The Himalayan Database is the source for other online Himalayan ascent databases (e.g. AdventureStats.com). The Eberhard Jurgalski List is also another important source for independent verification of claims to have summited all 14 eight-thousanders.

Name and details	Period climbing eight-thousanders	Born	Age	Nationality
Fausto De Stefani (Lhotse 1997); His partner Sergio Martini reclimbed Lhotse in 2000 to verify his 14, see above.	1983–1998	1952	46	(Italy) Italian
Alan Hinkes (Cho Oyu 1990); Hinkes rejected Hawley's decision to "unrecognise" his ascent, see "Cho Oyu dispute".	1987–2005	1954	53	(United Kingdom) British
Vladislav Terzyul (Shishapangma (West) 2000, Broad Peak 1995); As he did not claim the main summit of Shishapangma, this status is unlikely to change.	1993–2004 (deceased)	1953	49	(Ukraine) Ukrainian
Oh Eun-sun (Kangchenjunga 2009); As the potential first female climber of all 14, this dispute was followed internationally.	1997–2010	1966	44	(South Korea) Korean
Carlos Pauner (Shishapangma 2012); Pauner acknowledged his uncertainty as it was dark; said he might reclimb.	2001–2013	1963	50	(Spain) Spanish
Zhang Liang (Shishapangma 2018); Suspected the 2018 Chinese Shishapangma expedition stopped at central summit.	2000–2018	1964	54	(China) Chinese

=== Verification issues ===
A recurrent problem with verification is the confirmation that the climber reached the true peak of the eight-thousander. Eight-thousanders present unique problems in this regard as they are so infrequently summited, their summits have not yet been exhaustively surveyed, and summiting climbers are often suffering the extreme altitude and weather effects of being in the death zone.

Cho Oyu for example, is a recurrent problem eight-thousander as its true peak is a small hump about a thirty minutes walk into the large flat summit plateau that lies in the death zone. The true peak is often obscured in very poor weather, and this led to the disputed ascent (per the table above) of British climber, Alan Hinkes (who has refused to re-climb the peak). Shishapangma is another problem peak because of its dual summits, which despite being close in height, are up to two hours climbing time apart and require the crossing of an exposed and dangerous snow ridge. When Hawley judged that Ed Viesturs had not reached the true summit of Shishapangma (which she deduced from his summit photos and interviews), he then re-climbed the mountain to definitively establish his ascent.

In a May 2021 interview with the New York Times, Jurgalski pointed out further issues with false summits on Annapurna I (a long ridge with multiple summits), Dhaulagiri (misleading false summit metal pole), and Manaslu (additional sharp and dangerous ridge to the true summit, like Shishapangma), noting that of the existing 44 accepted claims (as per the table earlier), at least 7 had serious question marks (these were in addition to the table of disputed ascents), and even noting that "It is possible that no one has ever been on the true summit of all 14 of the 8,000-meter peaks". In June 2021, Australian climber Damien Gildea wrote an article in the American Alpine Journal on the work that Jurgalski and a team of international experts were doing in this area, including publishing detailed surveys of the problem summits using data from the German Aerospace Center.

In July 2022, Jurgalski posted conclusions of the team's research (the wider team being of Rodolphe Popier and Tobias Pantel of The Himalayan Database, and Damien Gildea, Federico Bernardi, and Thaneswar Guragai). According to their analysis, only three climbers, Ed Viesturs, Veikka Gustafsson and Nirmal Purja have stood on the true summit of all 14 eight-thousanders, and no female climber had yet done so. Viesturs is also the first to have done so without the use of oxygen. Jurgalski allowed for the fact that they had deliberately not stood on the true summit of Kangchenjunga out of religious respect. The team has not formally published their work, and according to Popier, they had not decided about "the best respectful form to present it".

== Proposed expansion ==
In 2012, to relieve capacity pressure and overcrowding on the world's highest mountain, greater restrictions were placed on expeditions to the summit of Mount Everest. To address the growing capacity constraints, Nepal lobbied the International Climbing and Mountaineering Federation (or UIAA) to reclassify five subsidiary summits (two on Lhotse and three on Kanchenjunga), as standalone eight-thousanders, while Pakistan lobbied for a sixth subsidiary summit (on Broad Peak) as a standalone eight-thousander. See table below for list of all subsidiary summits of eight-thousanders.

In 2012, the UIAA initiated the ARUGA Project, with an aim to see if these six new 8,000 m (26,247 ft)-plus peaks could feasibly achieve international recognition. The proposed six new eight-thousander peaks have a topographic prominence above 60 m (197 ft), but none would meet the wider UIAA prominence threshold of 600 m (1,969 ft) (the lowest prominence of the existing 14 eight-thousanders is Lhotse, at 610 metres (2,001 ft)). Critics noted that of the six proposed, only Broad Peak Central, with a prominence of 181 metres (594 ft), would even meet the 150 metres (492 ft) prominence threshold to be a British Isles Marilyn. The appeal noted the UIAA's 1994 reclassification of Alpine four-thousander peaks used a prominence threshold of 30 m (98 ft), (Note: The UIAA main list also includes summits that have a prominence far lower than 30 metres.) amongst other criteria; the logic being that if 30 m (98 ft) worked for 4,000 m (13,123 ft) summits, then 60 m (197 ft) is proportional for 8,000 m (26,247 ft) summits.

As of April 2024, there has been no conclusion by the UIAA and the proposals appear to have been set aside.

Proposed to the UIAA in 2012 for reclassification as standalone eight-thousanders.

List of the subsidiary peaks of the 14 eight-thousanders
Proposed new eight-thousander	Height (m)	Prominence (m)	Dominance (Prom / Height) as a %	Dominance classification
Broad Peak Central	8011	181	2.26	B2
Kangchenjunga W-Peak (Yalung Kang)	8505	135	1.59	C1
Kangchenjunga S-Peak	8476	116	1.37	C2
Kangchenjunga C-Peak	8473	63	0.74	C2
Lhotse C-Peak I (Lhotse Middle)	8410	65	0.77	C2
Lhotse Shar	8382	72	0.86	C2
K 2 SW-Peak	8580	30	0.35	D1
Lhotse C-Peak II	8372	37	0.44	D1
Everest W-Peak	8296	30	0.36	D1
Yalung Kang Shoulder	8077	40	0.49	D1
Kangchenjunga SE-Peak	8150	30	0.37	D1
K 2 P. 8134 (SW-Ridge)	8134	35	0.43	D1
Annapurna C-Peak	8013	49	0.61	D1
Nanga Parbat S-Peak	8042	30	0.37	D1
Annapurna E-Peak	7986	65	0.81	C2
Shisha Pangma C-Peak	8008	30	0.37	D1
Everest NE-Shoulder	8423	19	0.23	D2
Everest NE-Pinnacle III	8383	13	0.16	D2
Lhotse N-Pinnacle III	8327	10	0.12	D2
Lhotse N-Pinnacle II	8307	12	0.14	D2
Lhotse N-Pinnacle I	8290	10	0.12	D2
Everest NE-Pinnacle II	8282	25	0.30	D2

== Gallery ==
Note: This gallery is arranged in order of height, from tallest to shortest, of the eight-thousanders.

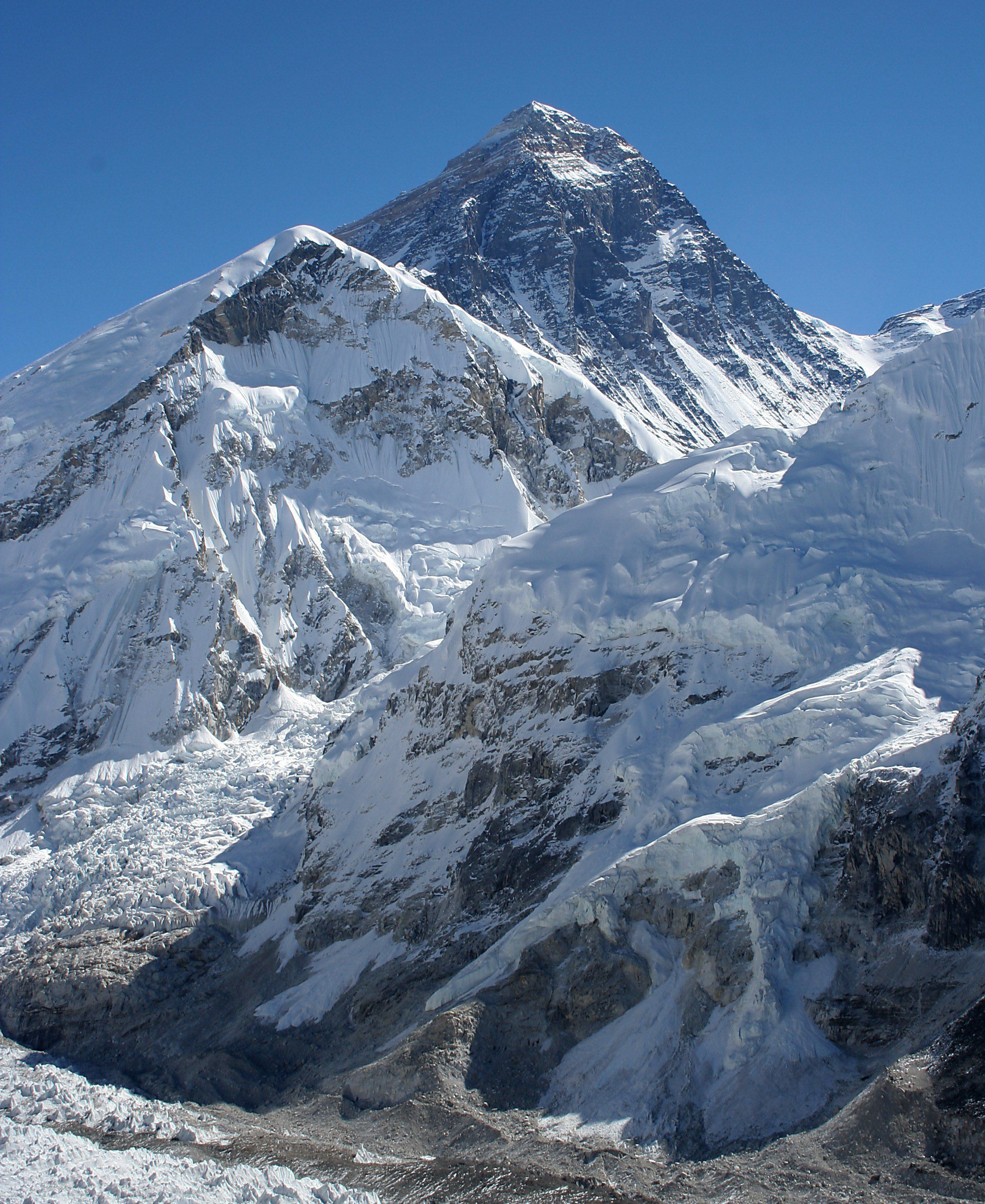
No. 1 – Mount Everest

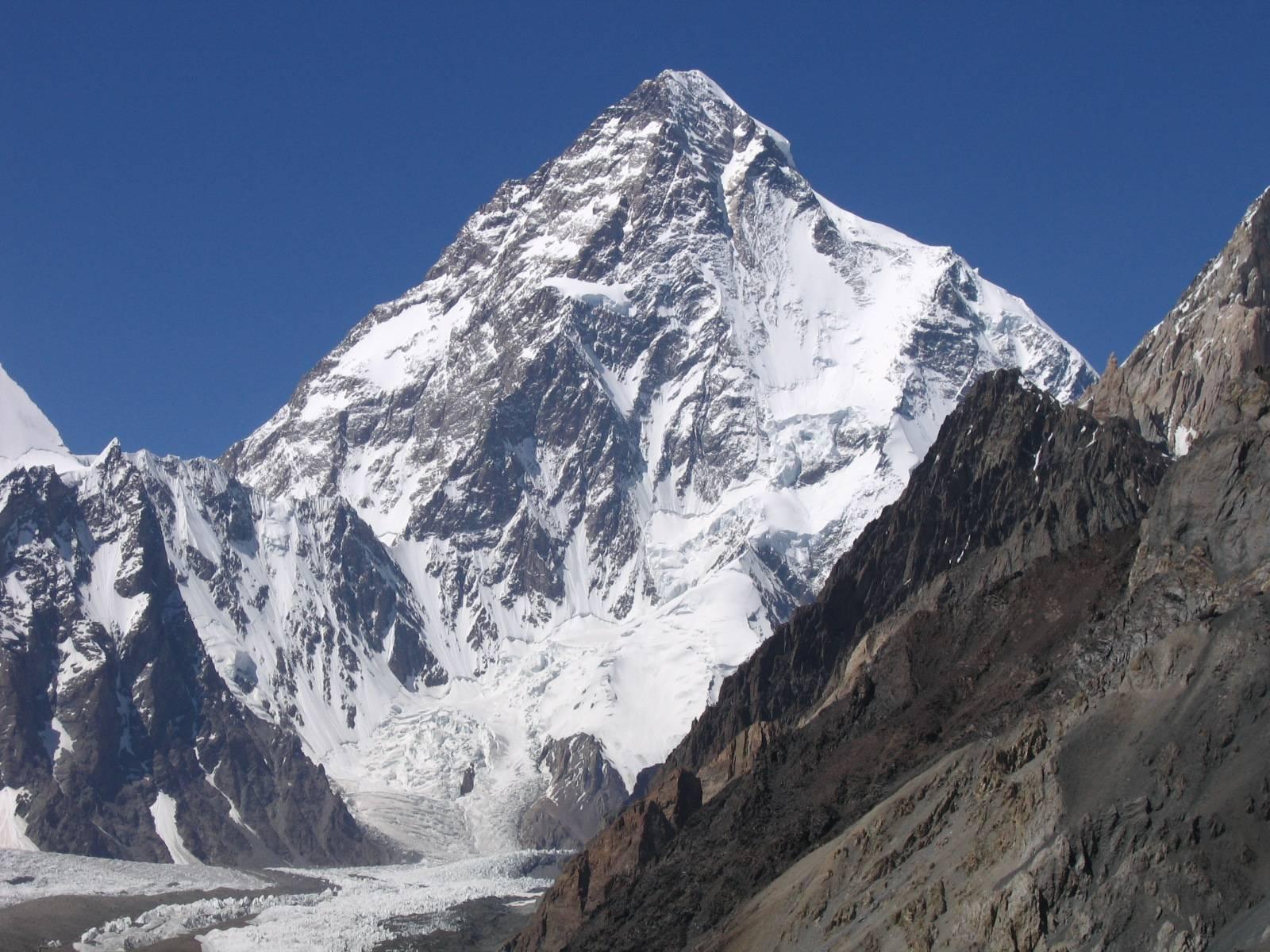
No. 2 – K2

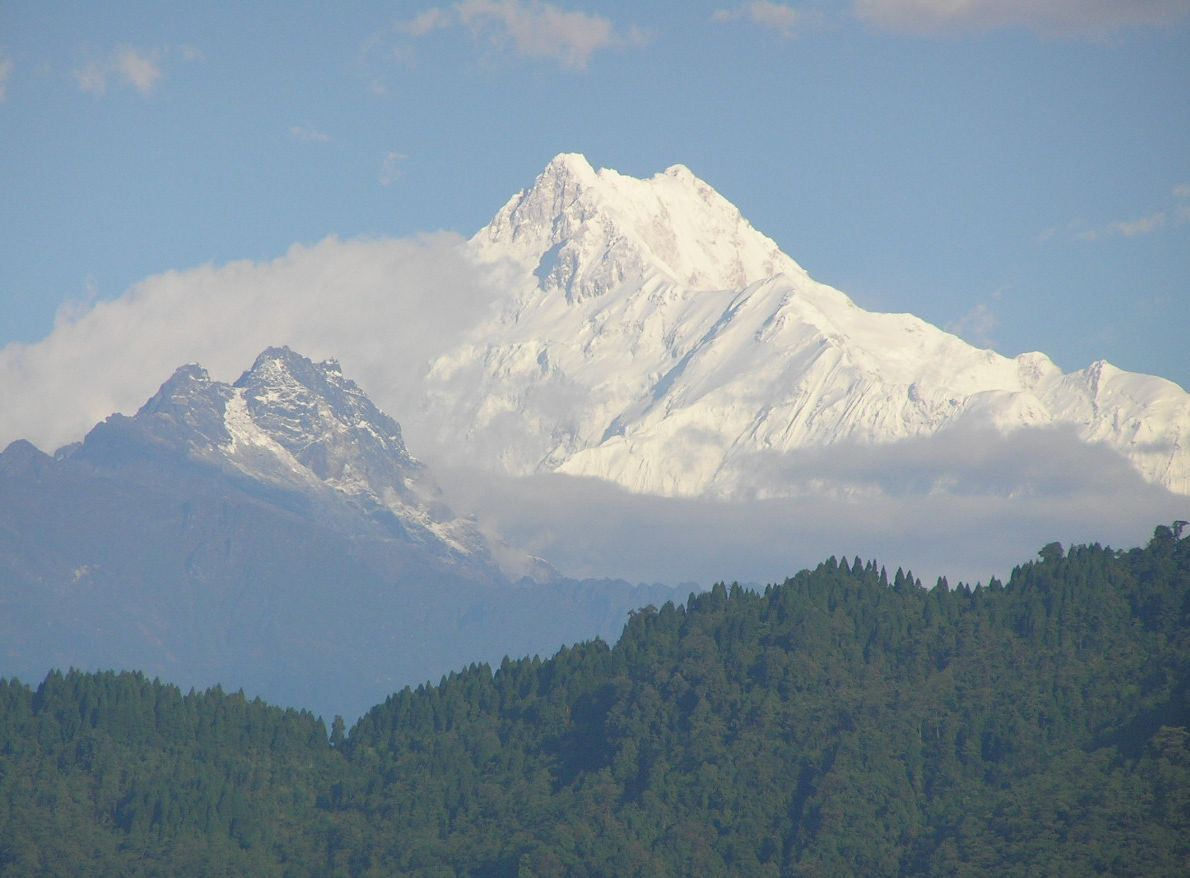
No. 3 – Kangchenjunga

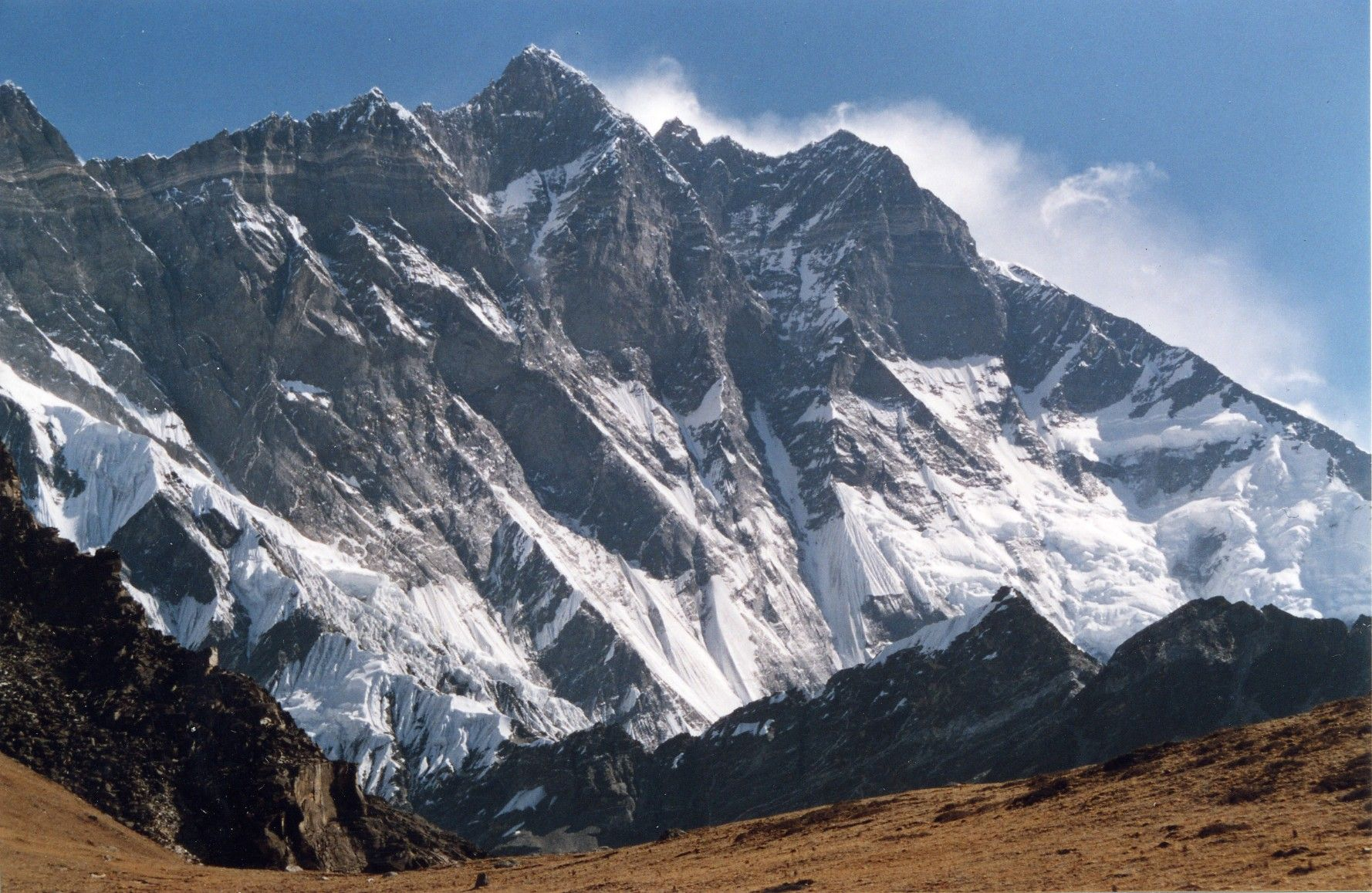
No. 4 – Lhotse

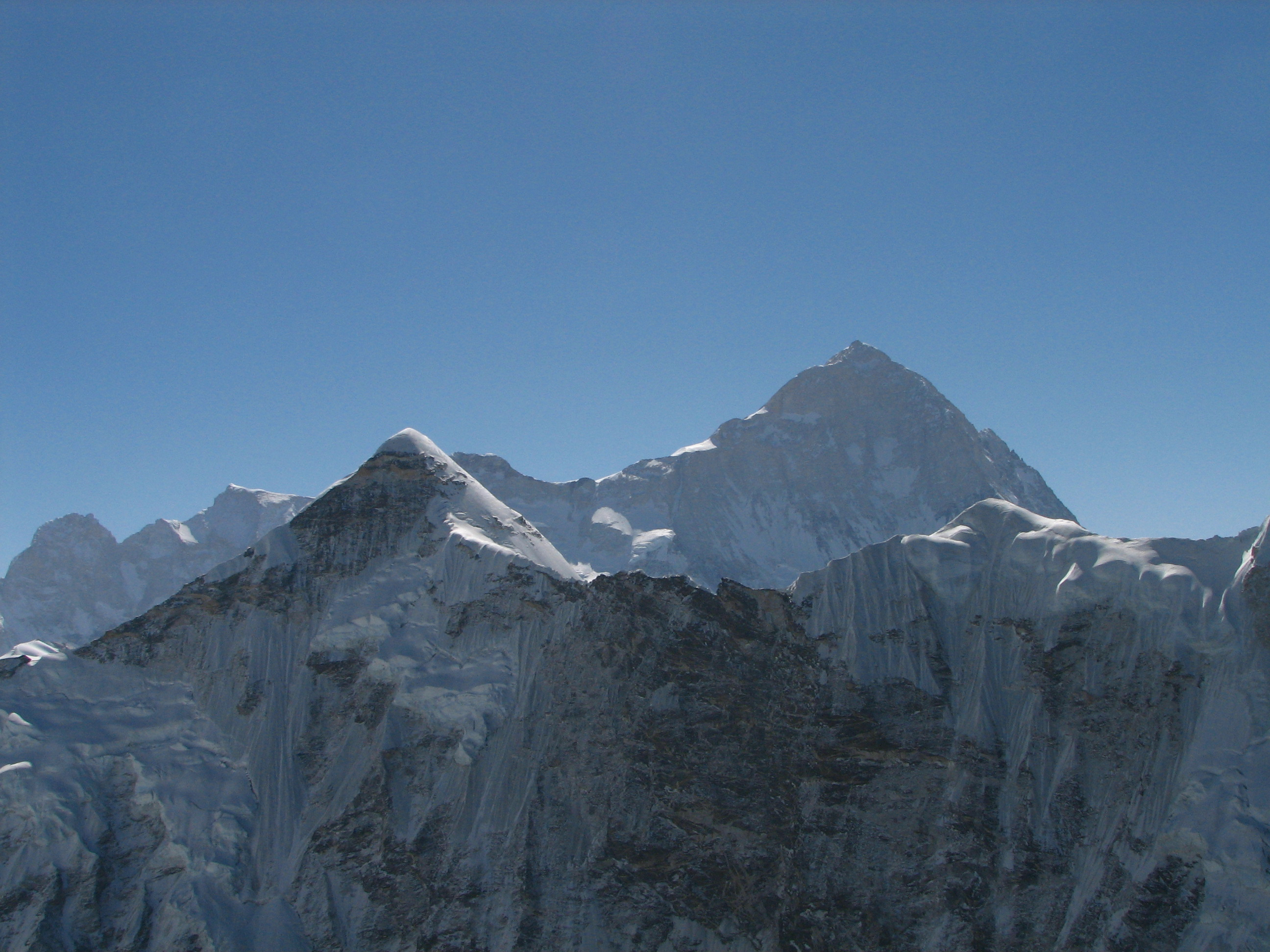
No. 5 – Makalu

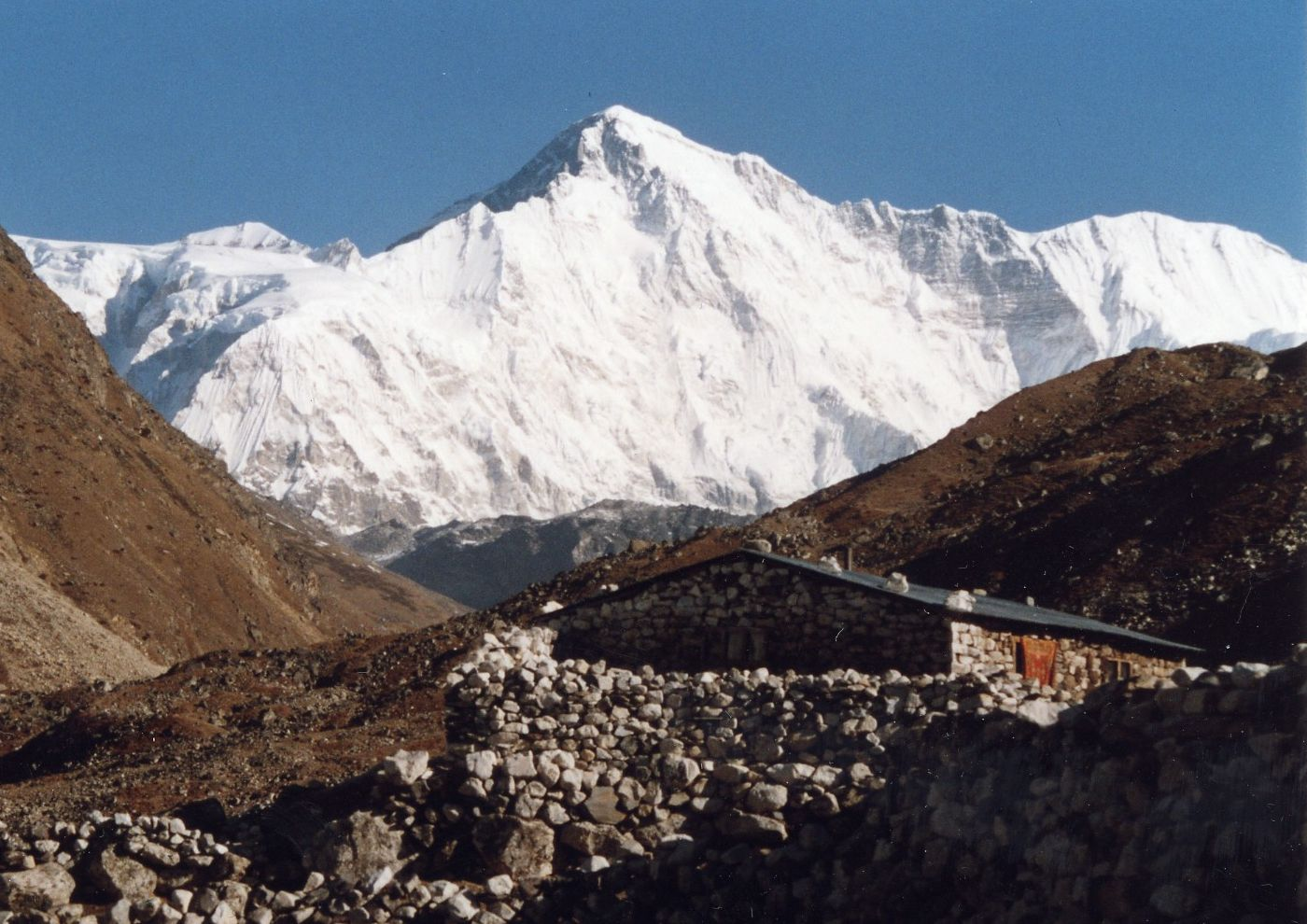
No. 6 – Cho Oyu

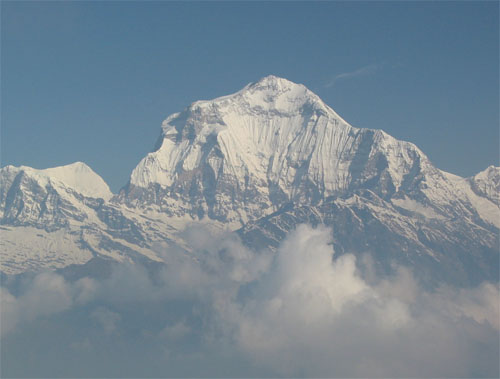
No. 7 – Dhaulagiri

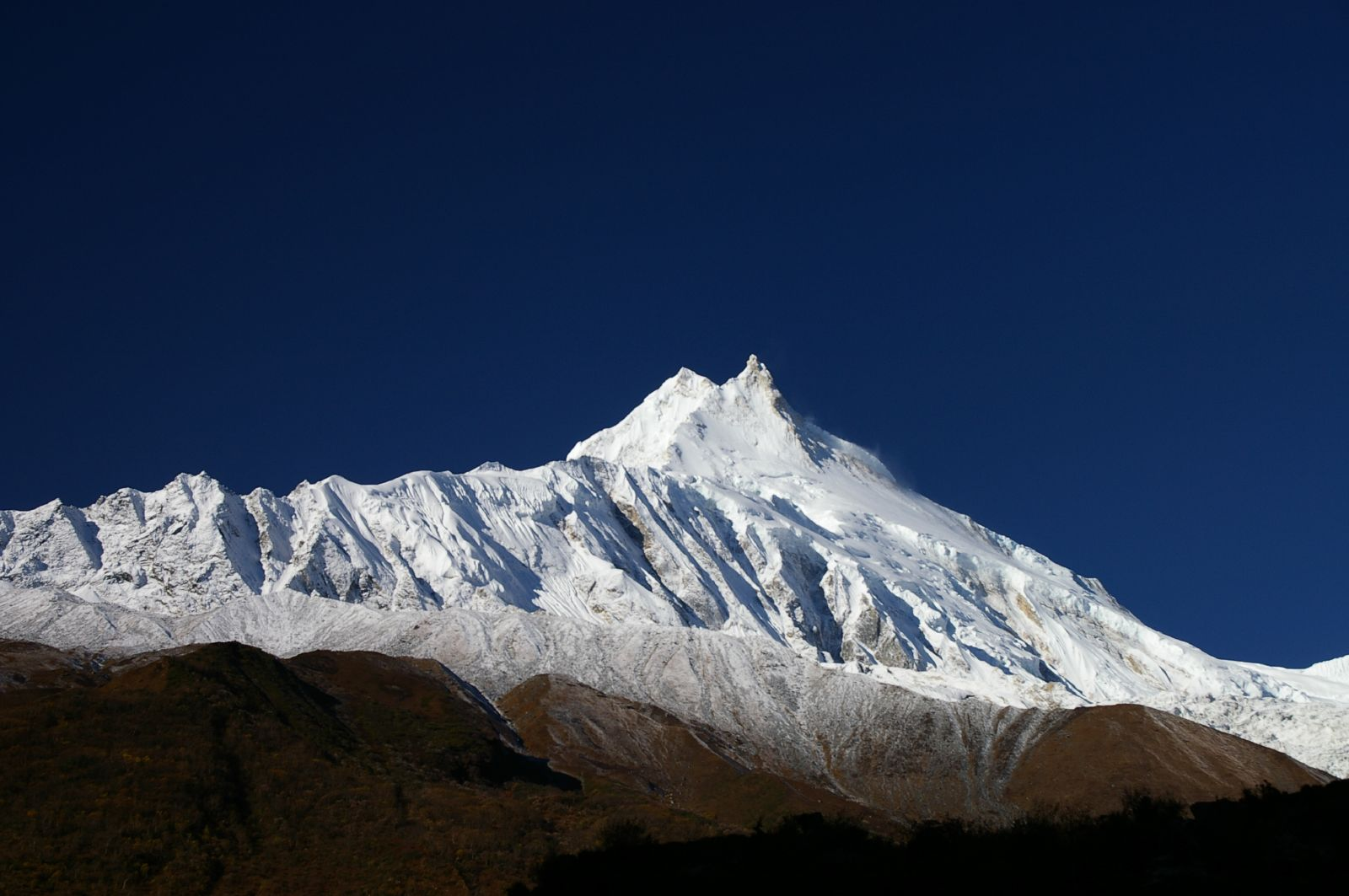
No. 8 – Manaslu

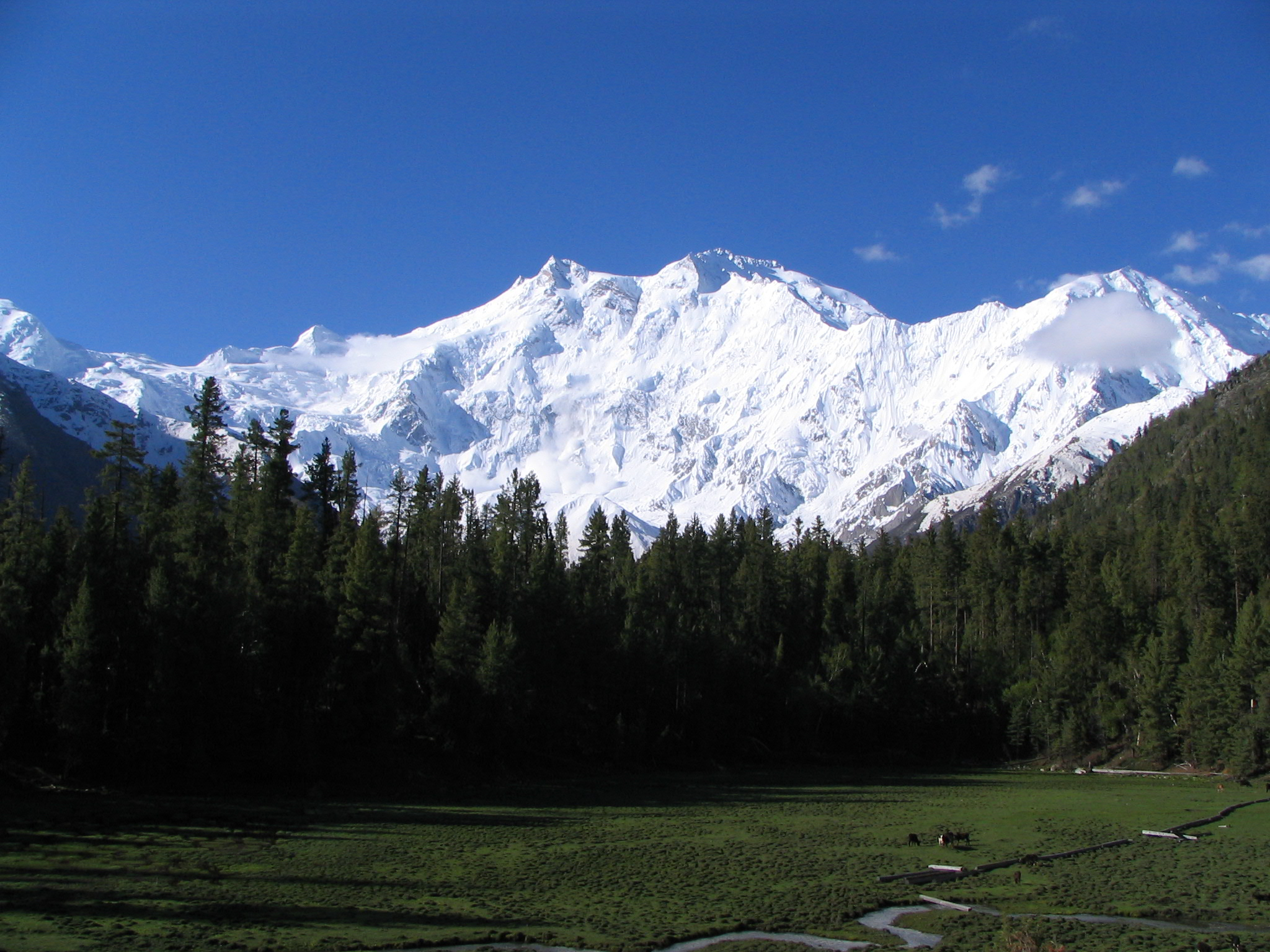
No. 9 – Nanga Parbat

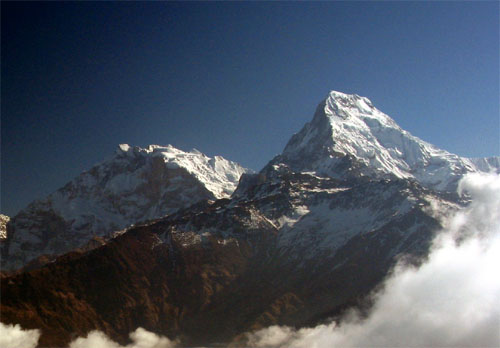
No. 10 – Annapurna

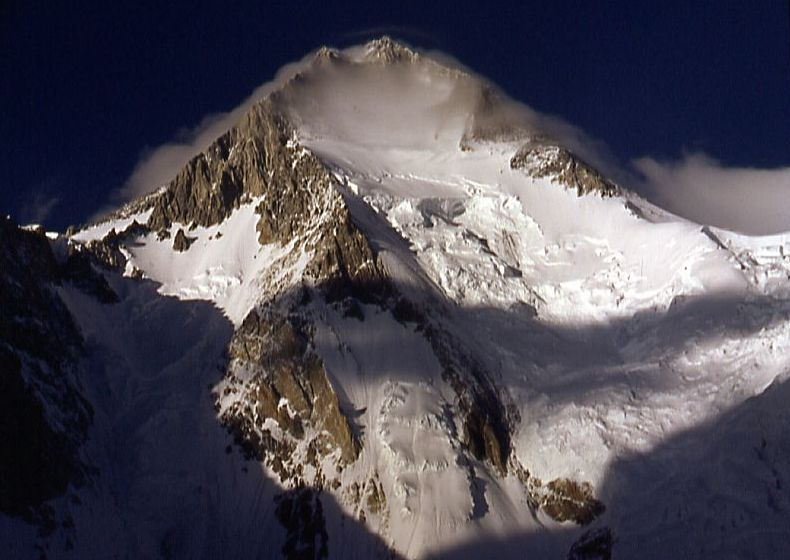
No. 11 – Gasherbrum I

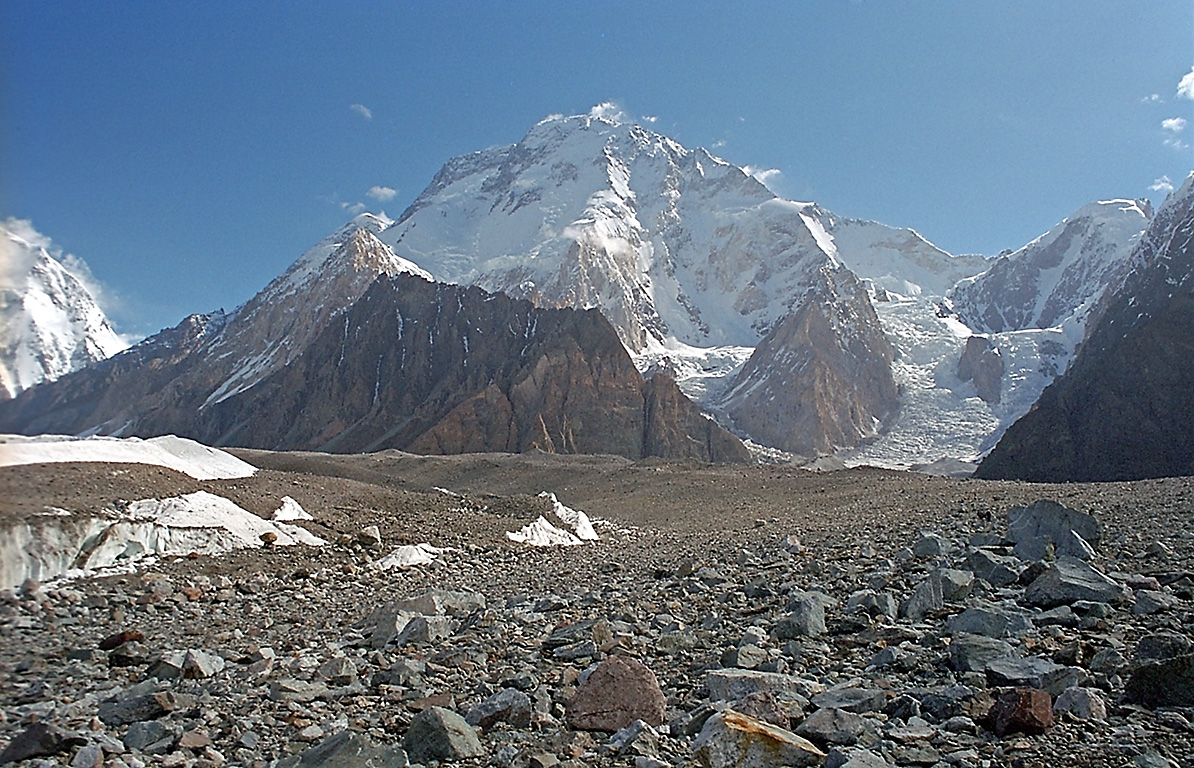
No. 12 – Broad Peak

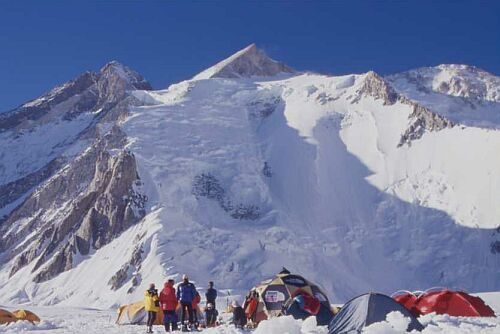
No. 13 – Gasherbrum II

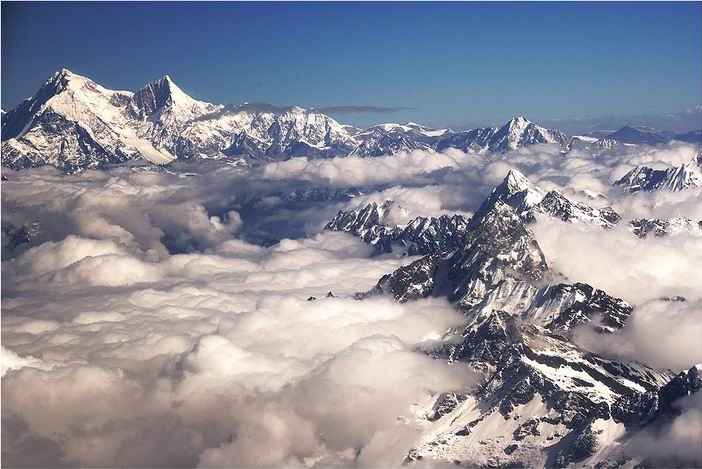
No. 14 – Shishapangma

== See also ==
- List of deaths on eight-thousanders
- List of Mount Everest summiteers by frequency
- List of ski descents of eight-thousanders
- Three Poles Challenge, the North Pole, the South Pole, and Mount Everest
- Explorers Grand Slam, the North Pole, the South Pole, and the Seven Summits
- Volcanic Seven Summits, the highest volcanos on each continent
- Fourteener, peak with at least 14,000 ft. elevation
- List of mountains by elevation
