= Sophie Lavaud =

French-Swiss-Canadian mountaineer

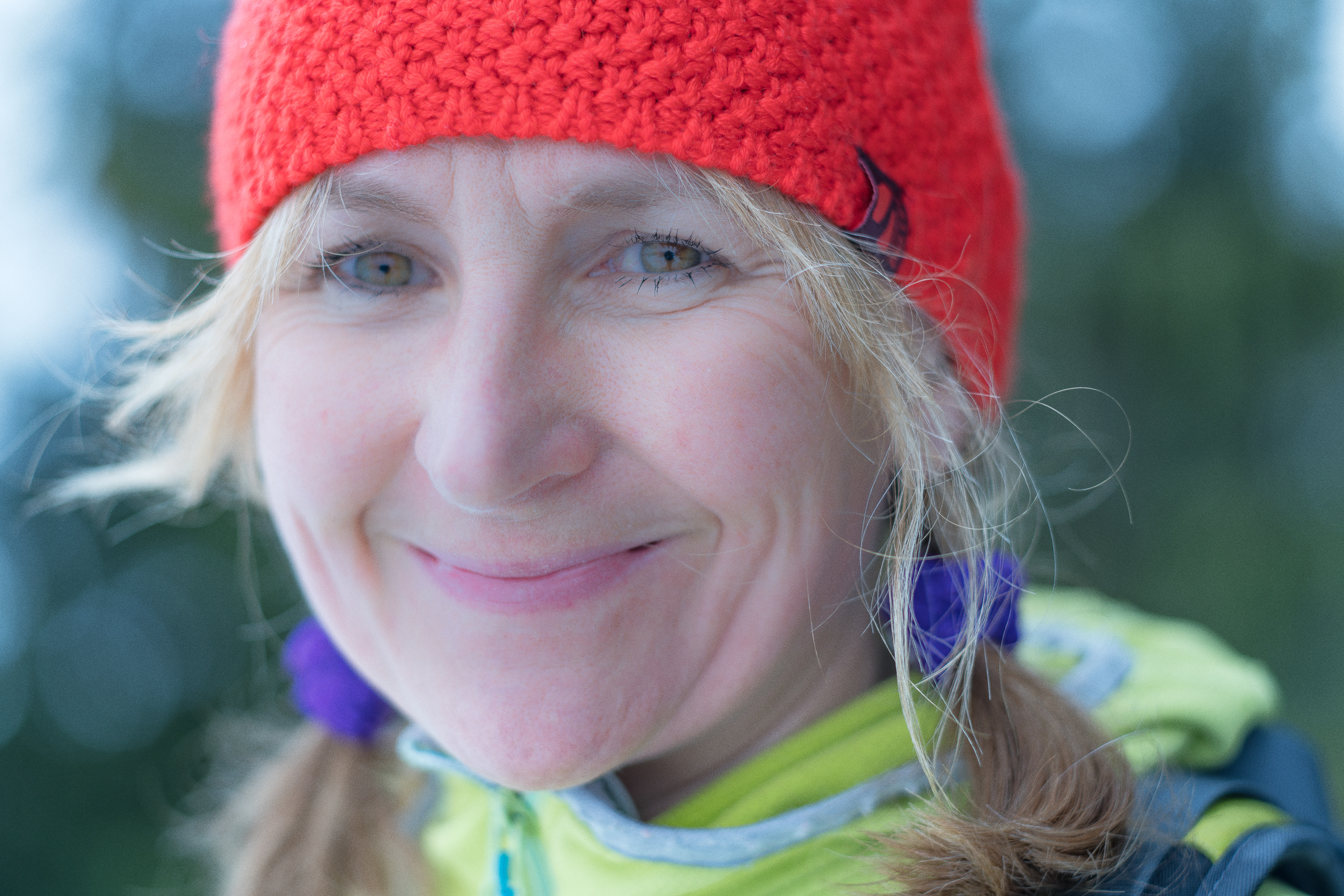
- Lavaud in her 2018 K2 expedition.
- Born: May 15, 1968 (age 58); Lausanne, Switzerland
- Other name: 112000 Lady (Note: Derived from 14 times 8000, referring to her accomplishment of summiting all 14 eight-thousanders)
- Citizenship: France; Canada; Switzerland
- Occupations: Mountaineer, entrepreneur
- Known for: Being the first French person, first Canadian person, and first Swiss woman to summit all fourteen 8,000-meter peaks
- Awards: Ordre national du Mérite (2024)
- Website: www.sophielavaud.com

Sophie Lavaud (born 15 May 1968 in Lausanne, Switzerland) is a French-Canadian-Swiss mountaineer and entrepreneur. In June 2023, she became the sixth woman, (Note: Excluding Oh Eun-sun's claim) the first French person, the first and (as of October 2026) only Canadian, and the first Swiss woman (second Swiss overall, after Erhard Loretan), to climb all 14 peaks of over 8,000 meters in elevation (eight-thousanders) and being 48th overall.

== Early life ==
Sophie Lavaud was born on 15 May 1968 in Lausanne, Switzerland to French-Canadian parents. She spent her childhood at her parents' flat in Argentière, a town situated in the French Alps, and learned how to put on ski footwear at the age of 3. At age 12, she attended classical dance classes.

Between 1986 and 1989, she studied at a business school in Lyon, before going to Milan. She worked in an inn, then a store selling luxury goods, and later moved to Geneva for her new job as the sales and marketing director for Le Richemond.

== Mountaineering career ==
In 2004, being offered a friendly challenge, Lavaud climbed the highest mountain in the Alps and discovered her passion for mountaineering, even though "nothing had really prepared her for it."

Eight years later in 2012, Lavaud became the first Geneva woman to summit two peaks of over 8,000 meters in elevation (eight-thousanders) — Shishapangma (foresummit) and Cho Oyu — in a single season. In 2016, she reached her fifth eight-thousander, becoming one of the very few women to do so.

In May 2014, she attempted to summit the Everest through the northern path. Fellow mountaineer and high-elevation mountain guide François Damilano went with her to film a 52-minute documentary titled "On a climb to the Everest". She later recalled her experience in the 2016 film "K2, Une journée particulière".

In July 2018, after a 2-year delay due to an avalanche, she successfully summited the K2, becoming the first Swiss woman to do so.

In Spring 2019, Lavaud broke her previous record of summiting two eight-thousanders in a season by an additional mountain, by summiting the Annapurna I (8091 m) in 23 April, then Kangchenjunga (8585 m) in 15 May, and later Gasherbrum I (8068 m) in 12 July.

In May 2022, she reached the Lhotse (8516 m), the 4th tallest mountain in the world. A month later, she intended to attempt the Nanga Parbat (8126 m) in Pakistan, though this was never made until a year later.

On 1 October 2022, she summited the Manaslu (8163 m), and later re-summited Shishapangma to the true summit (8027 m) in April 2023.

On 23 June 2023, Lavaud summited the Nanga Parbat, completing all 14 eight-thousanders, and becoming the first French person, first Canadian, and first Swiss woman to do so. As a result, she was awarded the Ordre national du Mérite by the French government on 23 May 2024.

== Timeline of eight-thousander summits ==
1. Shishapangma (foresummit, 8013 m), 14th tallest mountain, 11 May 2012
2. Cho Oyu (8188 m), 6th tallest mountain, 25 May 2012
3. Everest, tallest mountain, 25 May 2014
4. Gasherbrum II (8035 m), 13th tallest mountain, 16 July 2015
5. Makalu (8485 m), 5th tallest mountain, 25 May 2016
6. Broad Peak (8051 m), 12th tallest mountain, 11 July 2017
7. K2 (8611 m), 2nd tallest mountain, 21 July 2018
8. Annapurna I (8091 m), 10th tallest mountain, 23 April 2019
9. Kangchenjunga (8586 m), 3rd tallest mountain, 15 May 2019
10. Gasherbrum I (8068 m), 11th tallest mountain, 12 July 2019
11. Dhaulagiri (8167 m, Nepal), 7th tallest mountain, 1 October 2021
12. Lhotse (8516 m), 4th tallest mountain, 14 May 2022
13. Manaslu, (8163 m), 8th tallest mountain, 1 October 2022
14. Shishapangma, (true summit, 8027 m), 14th tallest mountain, 26 April 2023
15. Nanga Parbat (8125 m), 9th tallest mountain, 26 June 2023

== See also ==
- Erhard Loretan
- Eight-thousander
