= Sergio Martini =

Italian mountaineer (born 1949)

- Born: July 29, 1949 (age 76)
- Known for: 7th person to climb the fourteen eight-thousanders

Sergio Martini (born 29 July 1949) is an Italian mountaineer. In 2000, he became the 7th person to climb the fourteen eight-thousanders (and the second Italian after Reinhold Messner) having done so during 1983–2000.
