= 2021 K2 disaster =

Fatal mountaineering expedition on K2

Coordinates: 35.865°N 76.531°E

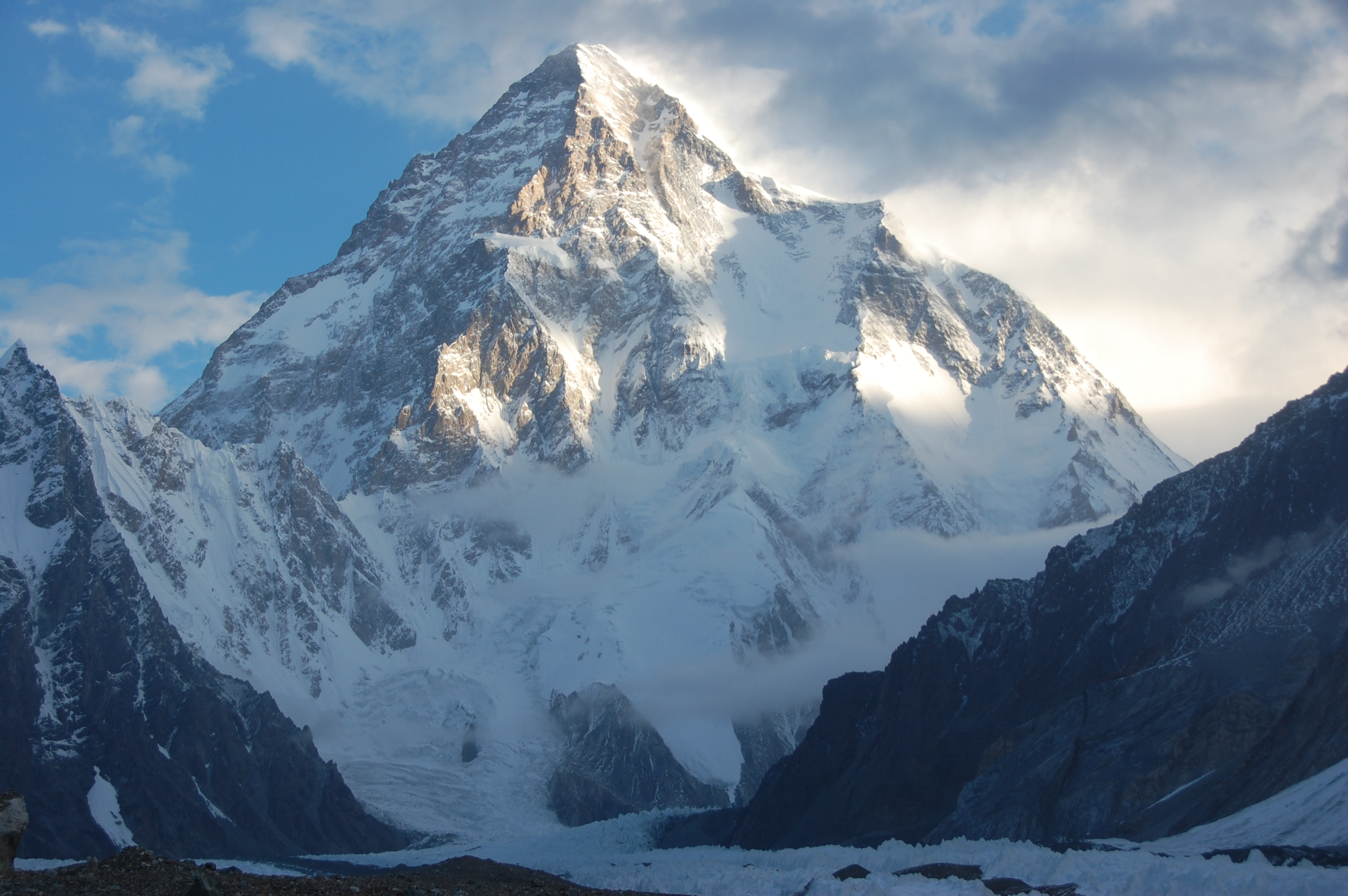
- Date: 5 February 2021
- Location: K2
- Cause: Unknown, possibly by hypothermia
- Deaths: 3

On 5 February 2021, three mountaineers went missing while attempting to summit K2 without supplementary oxygen, in extreme winter conditions. After extensive search and rescue efforts, they were declared dead. The group consisted of four seasoned climbers: Ali Sadpara, a veteran mountaineer; his 21-year-old son, Sajid Sadpara; Icelandic mountaineer John Snorri Sigurjónsson; and Chilean climber Juan Pablo Mohr Prieto. Sajid Sadpara survived, while the others died during the expedition.

== Ascent ==
On 4 February 2021, the group of four mountaineers began a winter expedition of K2, with the intention of making history by conquering the mountain in the winter without supplementary oxygen.

Weeks before, Nepalese-British mountaineer Nirmal Purja and a group of nine Nepalese mountaineers had made history by ascending the mountain in the harsh weather for the first time.

=== Bottleneck ===
On 5 February 2021, when the group reached the Bottleneck, a particularly technical part of the climb, Sajid Sadpara started feeling altitude sickness. His father, Ali Sadpara, advised him to use some oxygen from the emergency kit. The kit malfunctioned and he decided to return to Camp 3, where he planned to await the return of his companions. This was the last time the three mountaineers were seen.

Sajid Sadpara waited hours at Camp 3, but when they did not return at the scheduled time, he started preparing for the worst. Sajid returned to the base camp to arrange a search and rescue mission.

== Search and rescue mission ==
On 6 February 2021, a search and rescue mission was arranged, with Sajid Sadpara assisting the team. Helicopters flew up to 7,000 meters but were not able to locate the lost mountaineers. After the weather conditions worsened, the search and rescue operation was called off. Experts speculated that the three lost mountaineers would have perished by that time, as they were lost in the death zone, where the chance of survival was slim to none.

Sajid continued looking for the bodies for the next few months with the assistance of other mountaineers and volunteers. The bodies of the three mountaineers were found in July, four months after their disappearance, when the snow started thawing. They were found hanging by the safety ropes near the Bottleneck. Sajid was able to bring his father’s body down from the Bottleneck and bury him under the snow, with a Pakistani flag marking the location.

Commenting on the death of his father and his mountaineering companions, Sajid Sadpara said:

He set many records including the winter ascent of Nanga Parbat in 2016 and earned immense respect and praise from the best climbers in the world. This is his lasting legacy.

== List of fatalities ==
Name	Nationality	Date	Cause of death
Ali Sadpara	Pakistan	5 February 2021	Precise details unknown; likely hypothermia and exhaustion. No evidence of fall or avalanche. The position of the bodies and extreme winter temperatures suggest they froze to death.
John Snorri Sigurjónsson	Iceland	5 February 2021	Precise details unknown; likely hypothermia and exhaustion. No evidence of fall or avalanche. The position of the bodies and extreme winter temperatures suggest they froze to death.
Juan Pablo Mohr Prieto	Chile	5 February 2021	Precise details unknown; likely hypothermia and exhaustion. No evidence of fall or avalanche. The position of the bodies and extreme winter temperatures suggest they froze to death.

== See also ==
- List of deaths on eight-thousanders
- 1986 K2 disaster
- 1995 K2 disaster
- 2008 K2 disaster
