= K2 disaster =

K2 disaster can refer to one of several mountaineering incidents on the mountain K2:

- the 1986 K2 disaster
- the 1995 K2 disaster
- the 2008 K2 disaster
- the 2021 K2 disaster
