= Skatov =

Skatov (masculine, Russian: Скатов) or Skatova (feminine, Russian: Скатова) is a Russian surname. Notable people with the surname include:

- Atanas Skatov (born 1978), Bulgarian agronomist, mountaineer, and vegan
- Timofey Skatov (born 2001), Kazakh tennis player
