= Sergi Mingote =

Spanish mountaineer and politician (1971–2021)

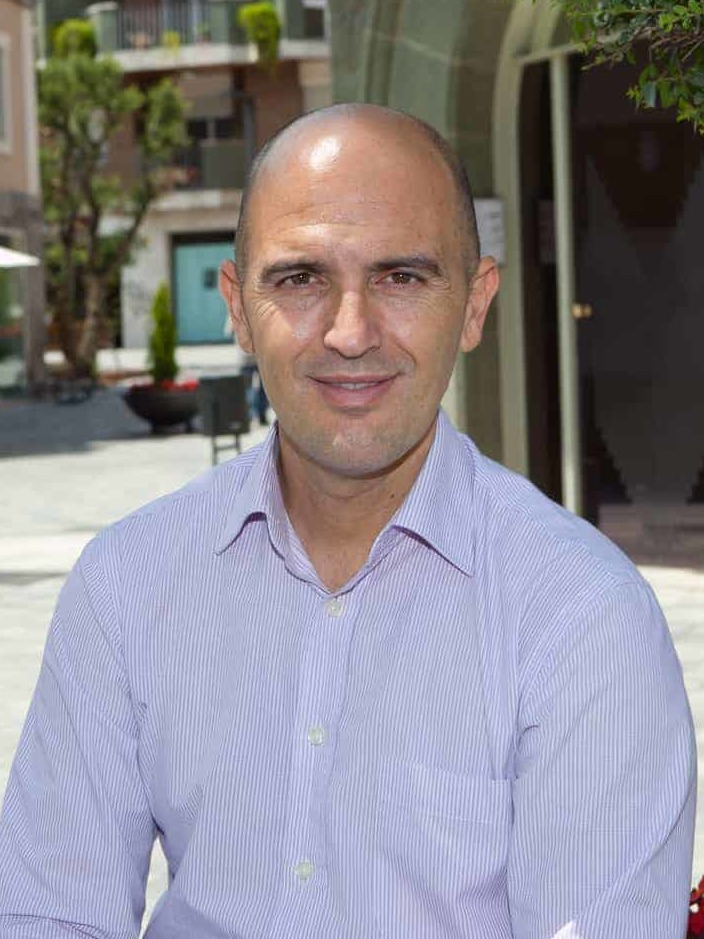
- Born: Sergi Mingote Moreno; 9 March 1971; Parets del Vallès, Spain
- Died: 16 January 2021 (aged 49); K2, Pakistan
- Occupations: Politician, mountaineer
- Website: https://www.sergimingote.cat/

Sergi Mingote i Moreno (9 March 1971 – 16 January 2021) was a Spanish mountaineer. He was also a lecturer and executive coach for The International School of Coaching. He held a diploma in managerial function from ESADE and Master in International Cooperation and Management of NGOs.

He was mayor of Parets del Vallès for the Socialists' Party of Catalonia between 2011 and 2018, when he left the mayor's office to focus on mountaineering.

Mingote was attempting to set a record by climbing the fourteen 8000 metre peaks without the help of supplementary oxygen in less than 1000 days which was named as '14x1000 Catalonia Project'.

In 2021, Mingote died while attempting to descend K2 in winter without supplementary oxygen. While descending from around Camp 1, he fell down to Advanced Base Camp (ABC). His GPS tracker showing unnatural movements alerted the climbers at the Base Camp and at Advanced Base Camp. The unexpected movement on his GPS tracker showed that he made a big fall and died shortly after being reached by fellow climbers and a medical team.

Mingote would be the first of five climbers to die on K2 during the 2020–2021 winter climbing season.

== Achievements ==
Mingote accomplished several mountaineering feats:

- Summited 10 eight-thousanders
- Summited 6 (one source mentions 6, another states 7) eight-thousanders without the use of supplementary oxygen in 367 days
- Record for the fastest back-to-back summits of K2 and Broad Peak (7 days)
- Summited Manaslu in 10 days without supplementary oxygen
- Summited Lhotse, Nanga Parbat, and Gasherbrum II without supplementary oxygen in 63 days

== See also ==
- Atanas Skatov
- Ali Sadpara
- Juan Pablo Mohr Prieto
- John Snorri Sigurjónsson
