= Rob Slater =

20th-century American mountain climber (1960–1995)

- Born: December 6, 1960
- Died: August 13, 1995 (aged 34); K2
- Education: University of Colorado, Boulder
- Occupation: Bond trader
- Known for: First ascent of Wyoming Sheep Ranch on El Capitan, 1995 K2 Disaster

Robert John Slater (6 December 1960 – August 13, 1995) was an American mountaineer known for his first ascent of the big wall route Wyoming Sheep Ranch on El Capitan. An avid outdoor recreationalist, Slater made notable climbs during his college years and later as he worked as a trader on the Chicago Board of Trade and for Goldman Sachs. He died on August 13, 1995, while descending from the summit of K2.

== Climbing background ==
Rob started climbing early, summiting the Grand Teton at age 13 with mountaineering pioneer Paul Petzoldt. He attended high school in Cheyenne, Wyoming and college at the University of Colorado at Boulder, an institution he chose for its proximity to the Flatirons. Slater climbed the very difficult route Wide Country (11a R) in nearby Eldorado Canyon, which is still considered difficult today despite the availability of sticky rubber climbing shoes and advanced equipment.

While in college, Slater began making summer trips to Yosemite Valley, where he climbed his first big wall route Zodiac with Tom Cosgriff, and Aquarian Wall with Robert Kayen. During his junior year, Slater met Randy Leavitt, who taught Slater how to BASE jump. Attempting a jump with Leavitt in the Black Canyon of the Gunnison National Park, Slater was forced to make a downwind landing on the wrong side of the river, twisting his foot and scrubbing their plans to exit the canyon by climbing one of the walls.

In 1982, he made the first solo ascent of the Pacific Ocean Wall, at the time one of the hardest routes on El Capitan. Slater capped his ascent with a BASE jump. In 1984, Slater put up Wyoming Sheep Ranch (A5) with John Barbella. Wyoming Sheep Ranch was considered the most difficult and dangerous aid climb on El Capitan for several years, until being downgraded to A4 later.

Slater may be the first person to take a leash-protected fall on a high slackline. In 1983, he set up a short 22 ft line under a freeway overpass in Pasadena with Scott Balcom and others. The line was 80 feet above the ground.

In 1992/93, Slater was the first to summit all the Fisher Towers near Moab, Utah. He contributed to the desert climbing trend of summiting all towers in an area.

In 1995, Slater ascended the 3000 ft ice waterfall route Slipstream in the Canadian Rockies. It took four attempts to reach the summit.

=== Final climb ===
Slater died in a storm on the descent from K2 along with five other team members, including noted English climber Alison Hargreaves. It was his first attempt at an eight-thousander. His body was never found.

== See also ==
- 1995 K2 disaster
