= John Snorri Sigurjónsson =

Icelandic mountaineer (1973–2021)

- Born: 20 June 1973; Ölfus, Iceland
- Disappeared: 5 February 2021; K2, Pakistan
- Died: c. 5 February 2021 (aged 47) (officially presumed dead at K2 Bottleneck on 18 February 2021); K2, Pakistan
- Body discovered: 26 July 2021
- Resting place: K2 Mountain
- Occupations: Mountaineer, member of the Icelandic National Rescue Team, Emergency Medical Technician
- Known for: First Icelander to summit K2
- Spouse: Lína Móey Bjarnadóttir
- Children: 6
- Website: johnsnorri.com

John Snorri Sigurjónsson (20 June 1973 – c. 5 February 2021) was an Icelandic mountaineer. In May 2017, he became the first Icelander to summit Lhotse in the Himalayas, which is 8,516 meters high and the 4th highest mountain in the world. On July 28 of the same year, he became the first Icelander to summit K2. On 4 August 2017, he successfully summited Broad Peak (8051 m).

On 5 February 2021, John Snorri along with Ali Sadpara and Juan Mohr went missing while attempting a K2 summit push from Camp 3. On 18 February, Pakistan authorities officially presumed the three men dead, but stated that the search for their remains would continue. On 26 July 2021, the bodies of the three missing mountaineers were found in the slopes above Camp 4.

== Early life ==
Born in the countryside of Ölfus, Iceland, he excelled at sports at an early age, and later found his physical and mental passion in mountain climbing.

== Mountaineering ==
His first notable success was Mont Blanc (4,808 meters) in 2011, the highest mountain in the Alps. In the following years he conquered some of the world's most challenging summits.

- Ama Dablam (6,812 meters) in 2015
- Mount Elbrus (5,642 meters) in 2016
- Lhotse (8,516 meters) in 2017 (first Icelander to summit)
- K2 (8,611 meters) in 2017 (first Icelander to summit)
- Broad Peak (8,047 meters) in 2017
- Matterhorn (4,478 meters) in 2018
- Breithorn (4,164 meters) in 2018
- Pollux (4,092 meters) in 2018
- Manaslu (8,156 meters) in 2019

=== Final climb ===
In November 2020, John Snorri, along with Ali Sadpara and Sajid Sadpara had organized an attempt to summit K2 during the winter season. On January 18, Russian-American climber Alex Goldfarb went missing during a training climb on nearby Pastore Peak. John delayed his plans to help with search and rescue operation, although the operation was not successful.

After arriving at K2, Chilean mountaineer Juan Pablo Mohr Prieto joined the group and on 4 February 2021, the group started their final summit push. Sajid had to descend to Camp 3 due to a technical issue with his oxygen device, leaving the others at the Bottleneck, close to the summit. His father, Snorri, and Mohr continued the ascent, but they did not return by night as planned.

Pakistani authorities declared on 18 February that the three men were officially presumed dead, but that the search for their remains would continue. At the end of June 2021, filmmaker Elia Saikaly, along with Sajid Sadpara and PK Sherpa, started a search on the mountain for the missing climbers. On 26 July 2021, the bodies of the three missing mountaineers were found by a Madison Mountaineering Sherpa Team fixing ropes above Camp 4. Snorri's body was found above the Bottleneck around 8,400 meters, still latched to the fixed ropes. Exhaustion has been cited as the cause of death.

At the request of his family he was buried on the mountain.

== Personal life ==
John Snorri was married to Lína Móey Bjarnadóttir. He had six children.

== See also ==
- Ali Sadpara
- Atanas Skatov
- Juan Pablo Mohr Prieto
- List of solved missing person cases (2020s)
- Sergi Mingote
