= K2: Siren of the Himalayas =

2012 American documentary film directed by Dave Ohlson

- Film poster
- Directed by: Dave Ohlson
- Written by: Darren Lund; Andy McDonough; Dave Ohlson; Jason Reid
- Produced by: Andy McDonough; Dave Ohlson; Jason Reid
- Starring: Fabrizio Zangrilli; Gerlinde Kaltenbrunner; Jake Meyer; Chris Szymiec
- Narrated by: Simone Leorin
- Cinematography: Dave Ohlson
- Edited by: Darren Lund; Dave Ohlson; Jason Reid
- Music by: Jonathan Haidle
- Production companies: Ursus Films; Roped In Productions; 2R Productions; Lucid Visual Media; Mind Vise
- Distributed by: First Run Features; XTreme Video
- Release dates: November 2, 2012 (Banff Mountain Film Festival); August 22, 2014
- Running time: 75 minutes
- Country: United States
- Language: English

K2: Siren of the Himalayas is a 2012 American documentary film directed by Dave Ohlson. The film follows a group of climbers during their 2009 attempt to climb K2, chronicling the climbers' attempt to surmount the peak on the 100th anniversary of the Duke of Abruzzi's landmark K2 expedition in 1909. The film also delves into the history and geography of the Karakoram mountain region.

== Production ==
The film was shot in Pakistan in the summer of 2009. Director Dave Ohlson made the trek to climb K2 with elite alpinists Gerlinde Kaltenbrunner (2012 National Geographic Explorer of the Year), Fabrizio Zangrilli, Jake Meyer and Chris Szymiec.

Upon returning to Seattle from his K2 expedition, Ohlson partnered with filmmaker Jason Reid, who brought in his post-production team to co-produce, edit and finish the documentary.

As the film takes place on the 100th anniversary of the Duke of Abruzzi and Vittorio Sella's landmark Italian expedition to the same peak in 1909, the filmmakers licensed rare archival footage, written commentary and vintage photos from the Duke's century-old summit attempt to provide a historical perspective on extreme mountaineering expeditions throughout the past century.

== Release ==
K2: Siren of the Himalayas world premiered at the Banff Mountain Film Festival on November 2, 2012, followed by its U.S. premiere at Mountainfilm in Telluride, CO on May 25, 2013.

The film had a successful worldwide festival run in 2013, and U.S. distributor First Run Features picked up North American rights for the film in 2014. First Run Features gave K2 a limited theatrical release in 2014, opening in New York City on August 22 and playing in select cities across the country.

The film launched on DVD in North America via First Run Features in August 2014, and it is now available digitally on iTunes, Netflix, Xbox, PlayStation, Vudu and Google Play. It was the Number One movie on iTunes in both the Sports and Documentary categories in late 2014.

Following the film's domestic success, worldwide distributor XTreme Video picked up international VOD rights, and K2 launched on the international platforms of iTunes, Google Play, Vimeo, Steep Edge, Garage Entertainment and Reelhouse on May 6, 2015.

== Reception ==
=== Critical reception ===
The film has received acclaim by critics collectively, earning a combined rating of 100 percent on Rotten Tomatoes and a Metacritic score of 63.

The Village Voice called it "a trek as thrilling as any Hollywood summer blockbuster, with real-life plot twists of death, unexpected heroism, and surprise endings…", and The Hollywood Reporter deemed K2 "an account of one modern expedition that draws fruitfully upon the lore of another."

Film Journal International wrote, "K2: Siren of the Himalayas captures courage, hardship and at times defeat, but above all Ohlson and his crew document the mountain itself, in all its staggering majesty. Some of the shots here are astonishing..." The National Review wrote, "The climbers viewed amazing sights, and they brought back something worthwhile — something worth seeing on as big a screen as possible.”

Some reviews of the movie were mixed, with The New York Times saying, "The documentary’s biggest highlight is its climbing footage...; the film gets in close, with snow on the lens, and captures the sound of piercing winds at high altitude”, but adding that "shedding light on the filmmaking process would have only enriched this well-wrought but limited extreme-sports portrait." The Dissolve also critiqued that "in this 75-minute straight shot of Discovery Channel cinema, no emotional crests are peaked, but viewers will come away informed."

=== Awards ===
The film was won numerous film festival awards including:

- Inkafest (2014) - Grand Prize.
- Festival De Cinema De Muntanya (2013) - Grand Prize.
- Festival Sayulita (2014) - Best Action Sports Film.
- Spokane International Film Festival (2014) - Golden Spiffy Award.
- Spokane International Film Festival (2014) - Audience Award, Best Documentary.
