= Jake Meyer =

British mountaineer and adventurer (born 1984)

Jake Julian Barrington Meyer (born 20 January 1984) is a British mountaineer and adventurer. He achieved fame by becoming the youngest Briton to climb Mount Everest in 2005, aged 21 years 4 months. In doing so, Meyer also became the youngest man in the world to climb the Seven Summits. More recently in 2018 he summited K2, the second highest mountain in the world, and climbed Everest a second time. He has taken part in over 30 expeditions around the world.

== Early life ==
From Tetbury in Gloucestershire, England, Meyer was educated at Beaudesert Park School, Hawtreys, Cheam School and Marlborough College, then embarked on the study of Environmental Geoscience at Bristol University, where he was also a member of Bristol University Officer Training Corps. He has since been commissioned into the Royal Wessex Yeomanry as an Armoured Troop Leader and has served in Afghanistan.

Meyer began climbing at 13. Aged 15, he saw in the new millennium with his father from the crater rim of his first summit, Kilimanjaro. At 18, he climbed Mount Elbrus in Southern Russia, Europe's highest peak. In 2002, he was awarded with a Winston Churchill Memorial Trust travelling fellowship to climb Elbrus (aged 18), Aconcagua (aged 18), Denali (aged 19) and Mount Kosciuszko (aged 19), the highest peaks in North and South America and Australia. He then climbed Mount Vinson, the highest peak in Antarctica, before attempting Everest.

== Everest ==
Meyer ascended from the Tibetan side, via the North Col-North East Ridge route. The climb started on 2 April 2005, reaching the summit on 4 June 2005.

He was accompanied by Diahanne Gilbert, the Scottish team leader, and two Sherpas, Mingma Nuru and Anil Bhattarai, who became the first Brahmin in the Hindu community to summit Everest from the North Col route.

Meyer's climb was in aid of the Children's Wish Foundation.

On the 23rd May 2023, Meyer summited Everest for a second time via the South Col Route from Nepal with Fursang Sherpa. This followed an attempt to climb Kanchenjunga, where he was part of a team that reached c8350m before turning back after the rope fixing team ran out of rope.

== Records ==
Meyer has broken and holds or has previously held several records:

- Youngest Briton to climb Mount Everest (2005-held until 2006). His "youngest Briton to climb Mount Everest" record was broken in 2006 by Rob Gauntlett who was 19 at the time.
- Youngest man in the world to have completed the Seven Summits (Bass Variant). Meyer was 'pipped at the post' to the title of "youngest person in the world" to climb the Seven Summits by 20-year-old American Danielle Fisher, who summitted three days earlier, taking the South Col route, but was able to claim being the youngest man in the world to complete the Seven Summits.
- Youngest ascent of Mount Vinson (highest mountain in the Antarctic) (2004 - held for 8 days)
- Youngest solo ascent of Aconcagua (highest mountain outside the Himalayas) (2002)
- Tenth (and youngest) Briton to summit K2 2018. His successful summit was the culmination of 3 attempts over 9 years (2009, 2016 and 2018). At the time he was the seventh Briton to have survived summiting K2. Meyer used his 2016 and 2018 expeditions to raise money for Walking With The Wounded.
- Shortest time to visit the highest point in every county in the UK. 82 counties, metropolitan counties and unitary authorities in 7 days, 4 hours and 20 minutes (2008)
- Shortest time to climb the highest peak in each of the 48 states of the Continental USA. The Freestyle Challenge was completed in 23 days 19 hours 31 minutes in 2006 as Meyer reached the summit of Mount Katahdin in Maine. The British team of 6 mountaineers were all from Bristol University and shaved nearly six days off the existing record of 29 days, previously held by American Ben Jones. Meyer's record held for nearly 9 years until it was broken by American's Josh and Lindsay Sanders in a time of 19 days, 7 hours and 37 minutes.

== Charity and youth work ==
Meyer has often used his expeditions to raise money for charities which are close to his heart, especially military and youth charities. He is an ambassador for Walking With The Wounded, and has also fundraised for Help for Heroes and the ABF (Soldier's Charity). He is a keen supporter of the Duke of Edinburgh's Award Scheme, and has also supported the Prince's Trust, Make a Wish Foundation, Prince's Teaching Institute, the CAIRN Trust (Child Action in Rural Nepal), and Mercy Ships . He is a regular speaker at schools around the UK and has an Explorer Scout Group named after him (The Meyer Explorer Scouts in Dursley, Gloucestershire).

Meyer was awarded the British Empire Medal (BEM) in the 2020 Birthday Honours for services to mountaineering, young people and charity.
