= Alison Hargreaves =

20th-century British mountain climber (1962–1995)

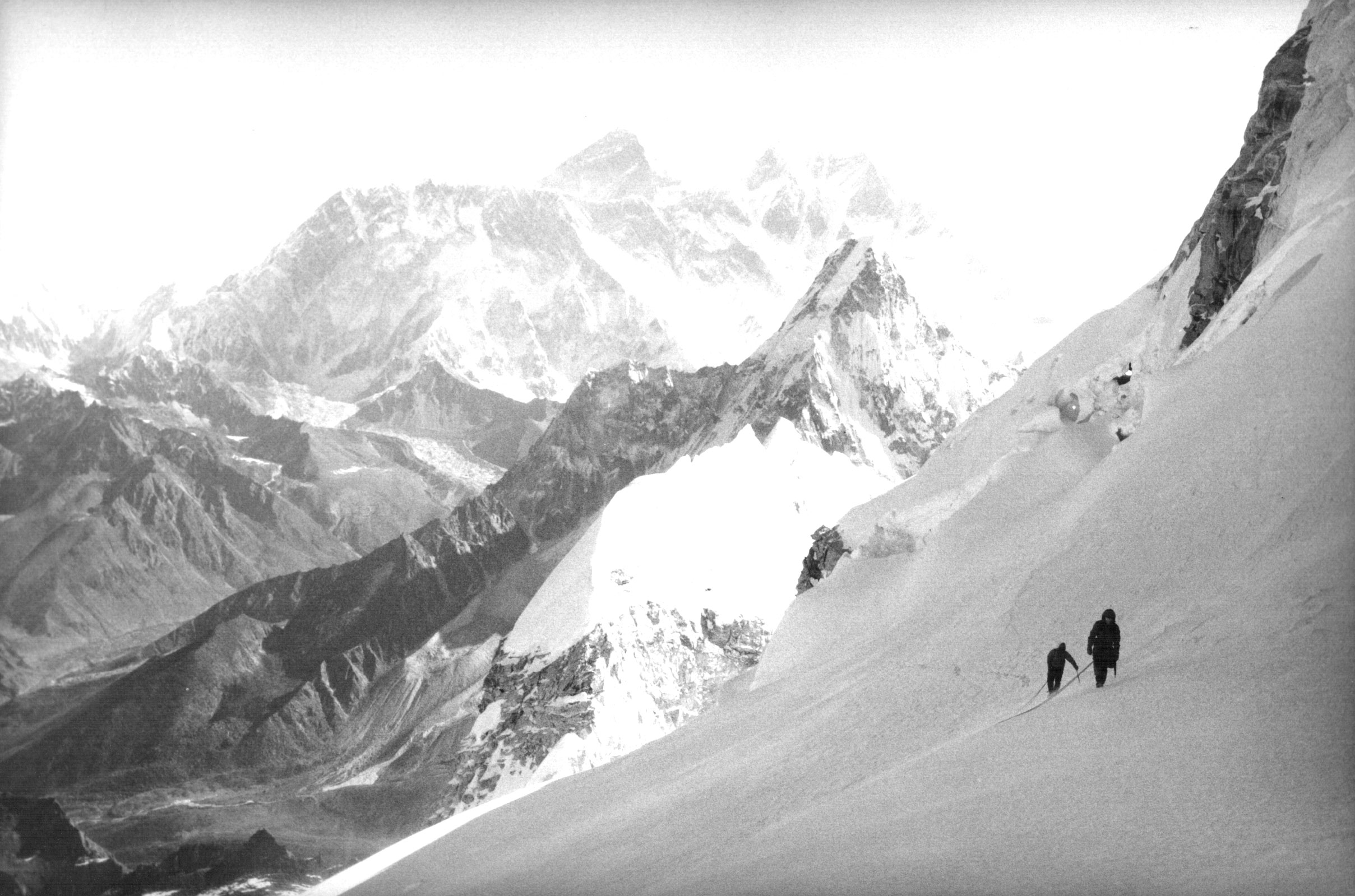
- Hargreaves and Jeff Lowe climbing Kangtega, 1 May 1986

Personal information
- Born: 17 February 1962 Derbyshire, England
- Died: 13 August 1995 (aged 33) K2, Pakistan
- Children: Tom Ballard Kate Ballard

Climbing career
- Type of climber: Mountaineering; Alpine climbing; Mixed climbing
- Known for: First female unaided ascent of Mount Everest.; First person to complete the solo ascents of the Great north faces of the Alps in a single summer season.

Alison Jane Hargreaves (17 February 1962 – 13 August 1995) was a British mountaineer and alpinist. Her accomplishments included scaling Mount Everest in 1995 solo and without supplementary oxygen or support from a Sherpa team. She solo climbed all of the great north faces of the Alps in a single season—a first for any climber. This feat included climbing the north face of the Eiger in the Alps. Hargreaves also climbed 6,812-metre (22,349 ft) Ama Dablam in Nepal.

In 1995, Hargreaves intended to climb the three highest mountains in the world—Mount Everest, K2, and Kangchenjunga—unaided. On 13 May 1995, she became the first woman to reach summit of Everest without the aid of Sherpas or bottled oxygen; on 13 August, she died while descending from the summit of K2.

== Personal life ==
Hargreaves grew up in Belper, Derbyshire, and attended Belper High School. After leaving home at 18, she lived with and later married Jim Ballard and, in 1995, the family moved to Spean Bridge, in the Scottish Highlands, closer to conditions suitable for her training.

She was six months pregnant with her first child, Tom, when she climbed the Eiger north face. Tom Ballard went on to become the first person to solo climb all of the six great north faces of the Alps in a single winter. He died in 2019 while descending Nanga Parbat.

== Great north faces of the Alps ==
In 1993, Hargreaves decided to solo climb the six great north faces of the Alps in a single season, and become the first person to do so. The spring and summer weather were particularly bad that year, and she was forced to use alternative routes for the Grandes Jorasses and the Eiger. Without pictures to prove her success and with the use of alternative routes, the media and climbing community did not initially approve of her climb. In order to settle things, Hargreaves solo climbed the Croz spur on the north face of the Grandes Jorasses the following winter. With pictures taken from a professional photographer, the media and climbing community believed her claim.

== Ascent of K2 ==
In June 1995, Hargreaves joined an American team with a permit to climb 8,611-metre (28,251 ft) K2. By 13 August 1995, the remnants of the US team, along with Hargreaves, had joined forces with a team from Canada and New Zealand at Camp 4, around 7,600 metres (24,900 ft) above sea level, and at least 12 hours from the summit. Later that day, having joined with a Spanish team of mountaineers above Camp 4, New Zealander Peter Hillary, son of Everest pioneer Sir Edmund Hillary, decided to turn back, noting that the weather that had been fine for the previous four days appeared to be changing. At 6:45 pm, in fine conditions, Hargreaves and Spaniard Javier Olivar reached the summit, followed by American Rob Slater, Spaniards Javier Escartín and Lorenzo Ortiz, and New Zealander Bruce Grant. All seven died in a violent storm while returning from the summit. Canadian Jeff Lakes, who had turned back below the summit earlier, managed to reach one of the lower camps but died from the effects of exposure.

The next day, two Spanish climbers, Pepe Garcés and Lorenzo Ortas, who had survived the storm at Camp 4, were descending the mountain while suffering from frostbite and exhaustion. Before reaching Camp 3, they found a bloodstained anorak, a climbing boot, and a harness. They recognised the equipment as belonging to Hargreaves. From Camp 3 they could also see a body in the distance. They did not approach the body, so it was not positively identified, but they had little doubt it was Hargreaves and concluded she had been blown off the mountain during the storm. After the incident, Captain Fawad Khan, the Pakistani army officer who was the team's intermediary with the rescue services, claimed that he had urged her not to climb beyond base camp because it would be "suicidal" in the deteriorating weather conditions.

== See also ==
- Catherine Destivelle, French alpine climber
- List of deaths on K2
- The Last Mountain (2021 film)
- Ed Douglas

== Sources ==
- "British Woman Conquers Everest (with pictures)". BBC.
- Curran, Jim (February 2000). K2: Triumph and Tragedy. Mountaineers Books. ISBN 0-89886-683-9.
- Susan Frohlick, "'Wanting the Children and Wanting K2': The incommensurability of motherhood and mountaineering in Britain and North America in the late twentieth century," Gender, Place and Culture, 13:5 (October 2006): 477–490.
- Peter H. Hansen, ‘Hargreaves, Alison Jane (1962–1995)’, Oxford Dictionary of National Biography, Oxford University Press, Sept 2004; online edn, May 2006
- Hargreaves, Alison (1995). A Hard Day's Summer: Six Classic North Faces Solo. London: Hodder & Stoughton. ISBN 0-340-60602-9
- Jordan, Jennifer (2005.) Savage Summit: The True Stories of the First Five Women Who Climbed K2, The World's Most Feared Mountain. New York: William Morrow.
- "Review of BBC documentary". Inside Story – Alison's Last Mountain'. Archived from the original on 17 June 2006.
- Rose, David; Douglas, Ed (2000). Regions of the Heart: The Triumph and Tragedy of Alison Hargreaves. National Geographic Society. ISBN 0-7922-7695-7.

== Bibliography ==
- Stephen Venables (1995) Obituary 21 August 1995 Independent Digital News & Media
