= Pastore Peak =

Mountain in Pakistan

Pastore Peak is a mountain in the Karakoram region of Pakistan close to the China border, near the famous K2 mountain. Pastore Peak has a height of 6,210 metres (20,370 ft). and is used as a training route by climbers while acclimating in K2 base camp. While it is considered an easy “trekking peak” during summer climbing season, the winter ascend is very challenging even for experienced climbers. One of the earliest descriptions of 'Pastore Peak as a trekking route was done by Ardito Desio in his 1956 book "Victory Over K2: Second Highest Peak in the World".
