= Christine Grant (alpine skier) =

New Zealand alpine skier (born 1962)

Christine Margaret Grant (born 1962) now Christine Kelly is an alpine skier from New Zealand.

In the 1984 Winter Olympics at Sarajevo, Grant came 26th in the downhill event. Her brother Bruce Grant competed at the same Olympics, also in alpine skiing.
