= Atanas Skatov =

Bulgarian mountaineer (1978–2021)

- Атанас Георгиев Скатов
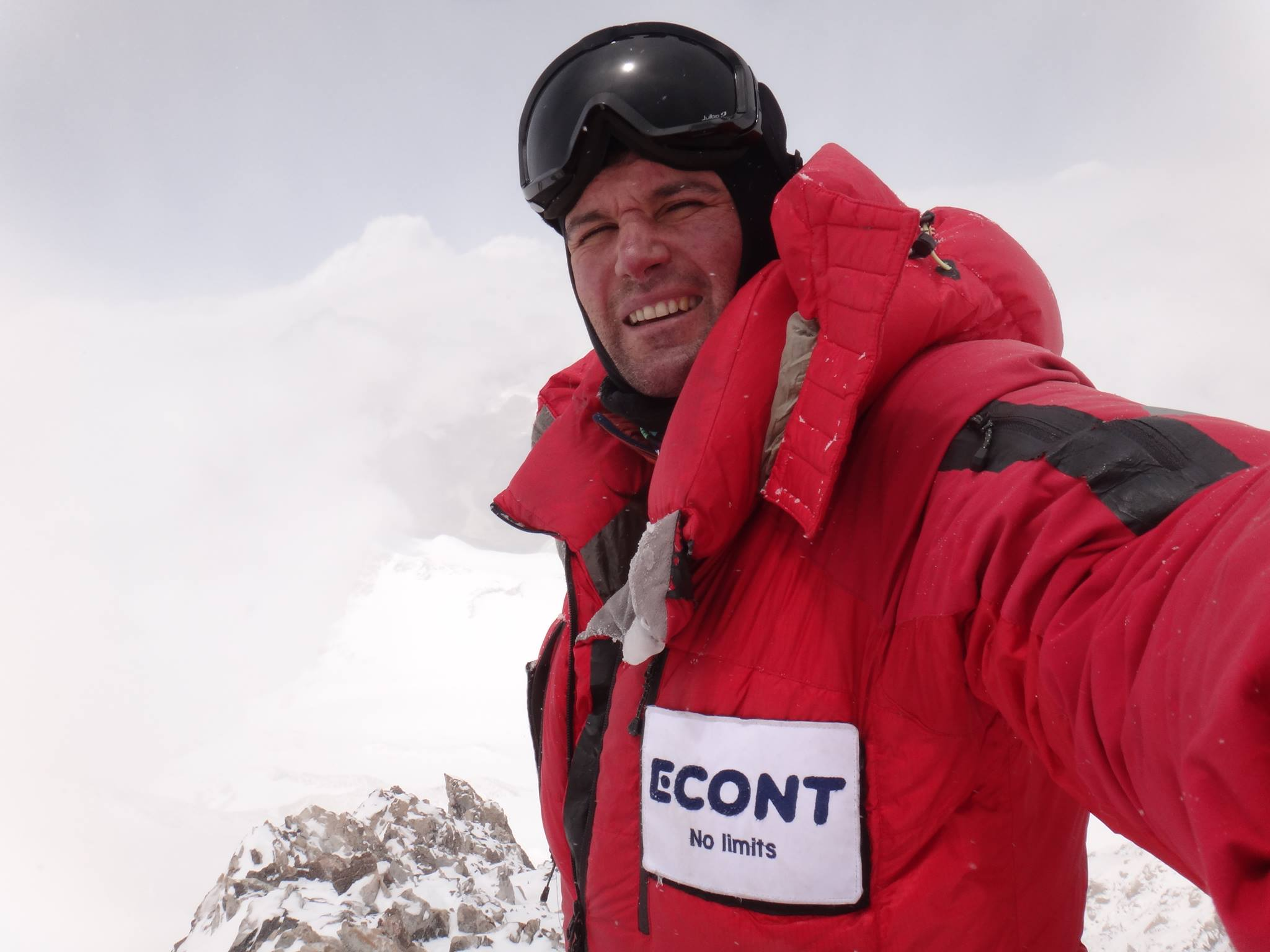
- Skatov, 23 May 2016, Summit Makalu, 8485m
- Born: Atanas Georgiev Skatov; 11 March 1978; Sliven, Bulgaria
- Died: 5 February 2021 (aged 42); K2, Pakistan
- Cause of death: Mountaineering fall
- Education: Humboldt University, Berlin
- Occupation: Agricultural scientist
- Years active: 2012–2021
- Known for: Veganism; Mountaineering
- Children: 1
- Awards: 2019 Green Person of Bulgaria
- Website: atanasskatov.com

Atanas Georgiev Skatov (Bulgarian: Атанас Георгиев Скатов; 11 March 1978 – 5 February 2021) was a Bulgarian mountaineer, vegan and agronomist in plant protection.

== Biography ==
Skatov was born in Sliven, Bulgaria. In 2001, he graduated from the Agricultural University of Plovdiv and held a master's degree in plant protection. He later earned a doctorate from Humboldt University in Berlin and worked as a scientist. Skatov later published scientific articles in Bulgaria and abroad.

In the summer of 2010, Skatov discovered his love of the mountains while hiking a mountain trail at home in Bulgaria. It sparked a drive to begin a more active lifestyle. He claimed that he had never been on a mountain until 2010 and had not been an active sports person before 2012. As he began to develop his physical health, he adopted a vegan lifestyle.

=== Mountaineering ===
Skatov was self-educated in the subject of climbing and mountaineering, often joining climbing expeditions as an expedition climber.

In May 2014, he claimed to have become the first known vegan to ascend Everest. His attempt was later refuted, as he admitted to having consumed honey. Skatov would become the first known person on a vegan diet to successfully climb the highest summits on six continents in less than two years, including four eight – thousanders in a week apiece.

In 2015, Skatov was awarded an "Honorary Citizen" of Sliven, Bulgaria. In the same year, he also published his first book and released his first documentary movie.

In 2017, Skatov ascended Everest from the Nepalese south side. In June 2017, he ascended Denali in Alaska becoming the first Bulgarian and the world's first vegan to successfully climb the Seven Summits.

In 2019, Skatov was awarded the 2019 Green Person of Bulgaria. At this time, he was attempting to become the first known vegan to climb the 14 highest peaks on Earth, and had reportedly summitted 10 of them.

=== Final climb ===
In 2020, Skatov was planning to climb K2 in his attempt to be the first vegan to climb all eight-thousanders. However, climbing expeditions that year were delayed due to the global COVID-19 pandemic. In December 2020, Skatov planned a winter ascent despite K2 being one of the world's most challenging and deadly eight-thousanders. The choice of a winter ascent was especially notable as at the time, K2 had never been successfully climbed in winter.

Skatov was described as a strong and technically competent climber, capable of making a successful winter ascent. On 16 January 2021, a Nepalese team made the first successful winter ascent of K2. Roughly three weeks later, Skatov died on 5 February, aged 42, of a fall while descending from Camp 3 after an unsuccessful ascent. Skatov and his sherpa began their descent after spending the night outside as there were not enough tents for the climbers on the mountain.

As they began to climb down, other climbers suddenly noticed Skatov's body falling from the mountain. Initial reports cited Skatov's cause of death to be due to a broken safety rope. These reports were later refuted. His cause of death was later attributed to overexertion.

His body was recovered by a Pakistani military helicopter crew later that day.

=== Legacy ===
Upon learning of his death, Bulgarian Prime Minister Boyko Borisov wrote:

"The mountain took another of our great climbers. Atanas Skatov was a brave man, a man with a cause. I express my condolences to his family and relatives. May his memory be bright!"

Skatov would be one of five climbers to lose their lives on K2 during the Winter 2020 – 21 season.

== Mountaineering expeditions ==
Year	Summit	Altitude	Mountain range	Country	Information
2013	Uhuru	5895 m	Kilimanjaro	Tanzania	
2013	Elbrus	5642 m	Caucasus	Russia	
2013	Mont Blanc	4805 m	Alps	France	
2013	Aconcagua	6961 m	Andes	Argentina	Reached 6,600m
2014	Aconcagua	6961 m	Andes	Argentina	Three-day solo expedition.
2014	Everest	8848 m	Himalayas	China	Ascent via the north route.
2014	Carstensz Pyramid	4884 m	Maoke	Indonesia	
2014	Vinson Massif	4892 m	Ellsworth	Antarctica	
2015	Manaslu	8163 m	Himalayas	Nepal	
2016	Annapurna I	8091 m	Himalayas	Nepal	
2016	Makalu	8463 m	Himalayas	Nepal	Four-day expedition.
2016	Gasherbrum II	8035 m	Karakoram	Pakistan	Reached 6,350m
2017	Lhotse	8516 m	Himalayas	Nepal	
2017	Everest	8848 m	Himalayas	Nepal	Ascent via the south route.
2017	Denali	6190 m	Alaska Range	USA	Seven Summits completed
2018	Nanga Parbat	8126 m	Himalayas	Pakistan	Without Sherpa and without oxygen
2019	Kangchenjunga	8586 m	Himalayas	Nepal	
2019	Gasherbrum I	8080 m	Karakoram	Pakistan	Without Sherpa
2019	Gasherbrum II	8035 m	Karakoram	Pakistan	Without Sherpa
2019	Dhaulagiri	8167 m	Himalayas	Nepal	Fourth eight-thousander in 140 days

== See also ==
- Sergi Mingote
- Ali Sadpara
- Juan Pablo Mohr Prieto
- John Snorri Sigurjónsson
