= Juan Pablo Mohr Prieto =

Chilean architect and mountaineer (1987–2021)

Juan Pablo "JP" Mohr Prieto
- Born: 9 February 1987; Santiago, Chile
- Disappeared: 5 February 2021; K2, Pakistan
- Died: c. 5 February 2021 (aged 33) (officially presumed dead at K2 Bottleneck on 18 February 2021)
- Body discovered: July 2021
- Resting place: K2
- Education: Colegio San Benito
- Alma mater: Diego Portales University
- Occupations: Architect and Mountaineer
- Known for: First to summit Lhotse and Everest without returning to base camp in less than a week
- Spouse: Juana Fernández (married 2011)
- Children: 3
- Parent(s): Raúl Mohr and Carmen Prieto

Juan Pablo Mohr Prieto (born February 9, 1987 – c. February 5, 2021) was a Chilean architect, rock climber and mountaineer. He held a Guinness World Record for making the first enchainment of Lhotse and Mount Everest without oxygen in 2019.

== Biography ==
In 2012, he graduated as an architect from the Diego Portales University and later devoted himself to taking mountaineering and rescue courses. He created the DeporteLibre Foundation, a non-profit organization that creates public sports infrastructure in abandoned spaces. Mohr was behind the development of one of the foundation's facilities, Parque de Escalada Los Silos, a free outdoor climbing gym in Santiago. Los Silos is the highest urban climbing park in Latin America.

=== Mountaineering ===
In 2017, Mohr and Sebastián Rojas summited Annapurna, becoming the first Chileans to achieve this feat. In 2019, Mohr was registered in the Guinness Records for being the first person to summit Lhotse and Everest without having to return to the Base camp in less than a week, without the help of Sherpas and without oxygen. In October of the same year, he made an ascent of Dhaulagiri, also without supplementary oxygen and without the help of Sherpas.

After these ascents, Mohr began to outline a project to climb to the highest summit of each of Chile's sixteen regions and build mountain shelters in all of them, declaring that “as an architect I want to design and build shelters in the highest mountains from each region to expand mountaineering in Chile", also developing mountaineering workshops and training for local communities with the aim of generating a system that allows the local administration of each refuge and generating activities that promote mountain culture, with the support of the Ministry of National Assets, the National Institute of Sports and the National Tourism Service.

=== Final climb ===
In late 2020, Mohr traveled to K2 with Sergi Mingote in an attempt to make the first successful winter ascent of the mountain. Mohr was on the mountain with Mingote when he fell and died on January 16, 2021. After the death of his partner, Mohr decided to continue his attempt with the Italian mountaineer Tamara Lunger, who later could not continue either. Mohr then followed the route of ascent alongside Pakistani mountaineers Muhammad and Sajid Ali Sadpara and Icelander John Snorri Sigurjónsson. Sajid, Muhammad's 20-year-old son, was forced to return from the so-called 'bottleneck' area of K2 due to a malfunctioning oxygen regulator.

On Friday, February 5, when the trio was preparing to conquer the summit, they lost contact with their GPS devices, presumably frozen by the extreme cold in the area. On Saturday the 6th, the three mountaineers were reported missing and the search began with the help of helicopters from the Pakistani army that reached up to 7000 meters, but due to adverse weather conditions they had to suspend the rescue without seeing Mohr and his companions. He was declared dead on February 18, 2021.

Mohr would be one of five climbers to lose their lives on K2 during the 2020–2021 winter season. In July 2021, Mohr's body was found on K2. In accordance with his family's wishes, his body remains on the mountain.

== See also ==
- Atanas Skatov
- Ali Sadpara
- Sergi Mingote
- John Snorri Sigurjónsson
- List of solved missing person cases (2020s)
