= Bruce Grant (alpine skier) =

New Zealand alpine skier (1963–1995)

- Born: 1963
- Died: 1995 (aged 31–32)

Bruce Lindsay Grant (1963–1995) was an alpine skier from New Zealand.

In the 1984 Winter Olympics at Sarajevo, Grant came 31st in the downhill event. His sister Christine Grant competed at the same Olympics, also in alpine skiing.

On 13 August 1995, Grant died during a violent storm while descending from the summit of K2 in Pakistan.

== See also ==
- 1995 K2 disaster
- List of deaths on eight-thousanders
