= Siddhi Bahadur Tamang =

Nepalese mountaineer

Siddhi Bahadur Tamang is a Nepalese mountaineer who holds the record for most successful ascents of K2, summiting seven times. He achieved his seventh ascent of K2 on 11 August 2025. On 29 July 2024 Siddhi Tamang became the first person to summit K2 twice within 24 hours between each summit.

== Early Life ==
Siddhi Bahadur Tamang was born in Gongar, Dolakha district, Nepal. He began work as a porter during the late 1990s before travelling to Ladakh in 2001 to become a kitchen helper. During this time he began rock climbing.

== Mountaineering career ==
=== K2 ascents ===
Siddhi Bahadur Tamang holds the world record for most ascents of K2 with seven successful ascents. He achived his first ascent on 22 July 2018, second on 28 July 2021, third on 22 July 2022, fourth on 27 July 2023, fifth on 28 July 2024, sixth on 29 July 2024 and seventh on 11 August 2025.

Tamang achieved his seventh ascent of K2 on 11 August 2025 whilst fixing ropes to the summit. This ascent had surpassed the previous record of six summits. After reaching the summit, Tamang descended K2 in an exceptionally fast time of 12 hours due to his national park permit time expiring on 13 August.

During July 2024, Tamang summited K2 twice within 24 hours between each summit. He achieved his fifth total ascent of K2 on 28 July 2024 at approximately 10am and then summited again for his sixth total ascent on 29 July 2024 at approximately 6.30am. This was the first time K2 had been climbed for a second time 24 hours after the first. This ascent also equalised Mingma Gyabu Sherpa's record for most ascents of K2.

=== Other mountains ===
Tamang summited his first 8,000m mountain in 2010 when he reached the summit of Cho Oyu without using supplemental oxygen.

Siddhi Bahadur Tamang has summited Mount Everest 12 times. On 14 May 2019 Siddhi Tamang led the rope fixing team to the summit of Everest, opening the route for the spring climbing season. The team consisted of eight Nepali mountaineers including Pasang Dawa Sherpa and Dorjee Gyaljen Sherpa.

During October 2026, Siddhi Tamang was one of seven Nepali mountaineers who fixed the ropes to the summit of Ama Dablam, opening the route for the autumn climbing season.
