= 1995 K2 disaster =

Mountaineering expedition disaster on K2

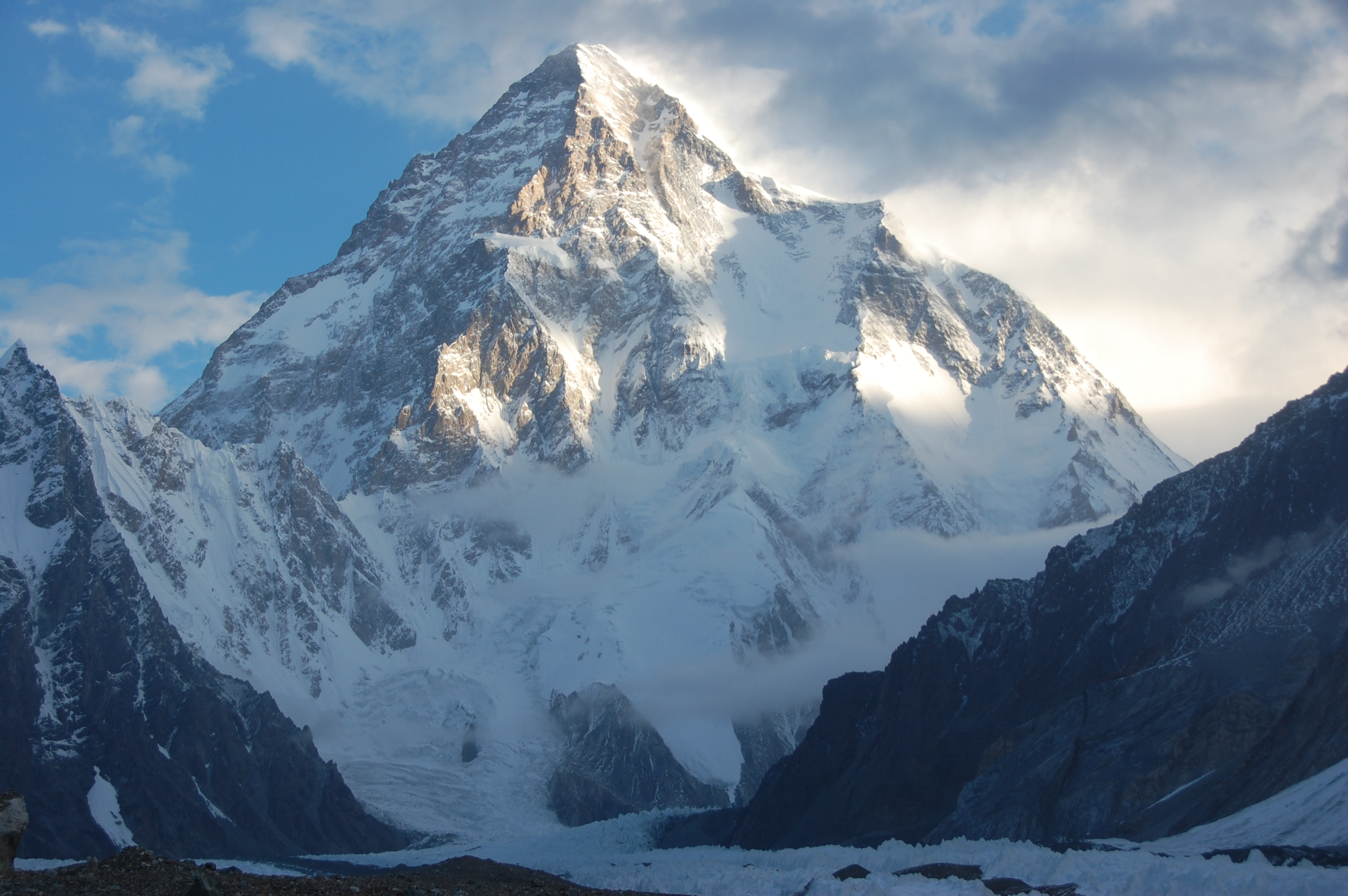
- Date: 13 August 1995 – 15 August 1995
- Location: K2
- Cause: Storm
- Deaths: 7
- Injuries: 2

The 1995 K2 disaster was a mountaineering disaster on K2 in Pakistan, the world's second highest mountain. Six people are reported to have died on 13 August 1995, on K2, largely related to bad weather, especially regarding the high winds present. Scott Fischer was climbing Broad Peak at the time, and suggested that a contributing factor was the combination of brutal cold and 160-kilometre-per-hour-plus (100 mph) winds.

== Background ==
=== The Mountain ===
K2 is the second-highest mountain on Earth, after Mount Everest, at 8,611 metres (28,251 ft). It lies in the Karakoram range and is often considered to be the most deadly mountain on Earth due to its steepness as compared to other eight-thousanders. Prior to 2021, approximately one person had died on the mountain for every four who reached the summit.

=== Expedition Goal ===
The primary goal for the climbers was to successfully climb K2 which only few had done at this point. Besides that, several climbers aimed to accomplish significant personal and professional milestones, as outlined below.

==== Alison Hargreaves ====
Alison Hargreaves, a British mountaineer had set out to climb K2 in 1995 as part of grand objective of climbing all three of the world's highest mountains unaided. She had recently climbed Mount Everest without any supplemental oxygen, being the first woman to do so alone.

Hargreaves, after completing her climb to Everest in May, flew to Pakistan on June 11, 1995. She then travelled to the Karakoram region, where she joined a group of international climbers at the base camp. Hargreaves then made several attempts to climb K2 throughout the months of June and July but was unsuccessful due to severe weather conditions.

Hargreaves planned another attempt to climb in the month of August despite the fact she was warned by others to not go climbing, as in such conditions it could potentially be life threatening.

==== Spanish Team ====
Two Spanish clubs, Montañeros de Aragón from Zaragoza, and Peña Guara Club from Huesca were also planning to climb K2 in the Summer of 1995. Their members included Javier Escartín, Lorenzo Ortíz, Lorenzo Ortas Monson, Javier Olivar and several others all of whom had previously climbed nearby peaks like Hidden Peak and Nanga Parbat, and their goal was to successfully climb K2.

==== American Team ====
The American team consisting of Rob Slater, Scott Johnston, Jack Roberts and many others had come to Pakistan in late May with the goal of summiting K2. The team made several attempts to climb K2 but were unable to do so due to bad weather conditions. By August 8, porters were called to leave K2 and the team left, except for Slater who planned to continue the expedition with the New Zealand team.

Slater had no prior experience in climbing peaks more than 7,000 metres and K2 was both his first seven-thousander and eight-thousander. Despite the risk, he had prepared for the expedition for almost two years and was hoping to climb the mountain in 1995.

== Expedition ==
An American team had gained a permit to climb 8,611-metre (28,251 ft) K2 in the summer of 1995. K2 is regarded as a significantly more difficult and dangerous climb than Mount Everest. By 13 August 1995, the remnants of the U.S. team and Alison Hargreaves had joined forces with a New Zealand and Canadian team at Camp 4, around 7,600 metres (24,900 ft) above sea level, and at least 12 hours from the summit. Later that day, having joined with a Spanish team of mountaineers above Camp 4, New Zealander Peter Hillary, son of Everest pioneer Sir Edmund Hillary, decided to turn back, noting that the weather that had been fine for the previous four days appeared to be changing. At 6:45 p.m., in fine conditions, Hargreaves and Spaniard Javier Olivar reached the summit, followed by American Rob Slater, Spaniards Javier Escartín and Lorenzo Ortíz, and New Zealander Bruce Grant. All six died in a violent storm while returning from the summit. Canadian Jeff Lakes, who had turned back below the summit earlier, managed to reach one of the lower camps but died from the effects of exposure.

The next day, two Spanish climbers, Pepe Garces and Lorenzo Ortas Monson (not Lorenzo Ortíz, who was killed in the storm), who had survived the storm at Camp 4, were descending the mountain suffering from frostbite and exhaustion. Before reaching Camp 3 they found a bloodstained anorak, a climbing boot, and a harness. They recognized the equipment as belonging to Hargreaves. From Camp 3 they could also see a body in the distance. They did not approach the body, so it was not positively identified, but they had little doubt it was Hargreaves and concluded she had been blown off the mountain during the storm. Lorenzo Ortas and Pepe Garces survived but had to be airlifted out, enduring six days without a tent.

== List of fatalities ==
Name	Nationality	Date	Cause of death
Alison Hargreaves	United Kingdom	13 August 1995	Precise details unknown; possibly blown off the mountain
Javier Olivar	Spain	13 August 1995	Precise details unknown; lost in storm
Rob Slater	United States	13 August 1995	Precise details unknown; lost in storm
Javier Escartín	Spain	13 August 1995	Precise details unknown; lost in storm
Lorenzo Ortíz	Spain	13 August 1995	Precise details unknown; lost in storm
Bruce Grant	New Zealand	13 August 1995	Precise details unknown; lost in storm
Jeff Lakes	Canada	15 August 1995	Exposure

Earlier in the season, Jordi Anglès died from a fall at K2.

== See also ==
- 1953 American Karakoram expedition
- 1986 K2 disaster
- 2008 K2 disaster
- Gilkey Memorial
