= Bottleneck (K2) =

Location on K2

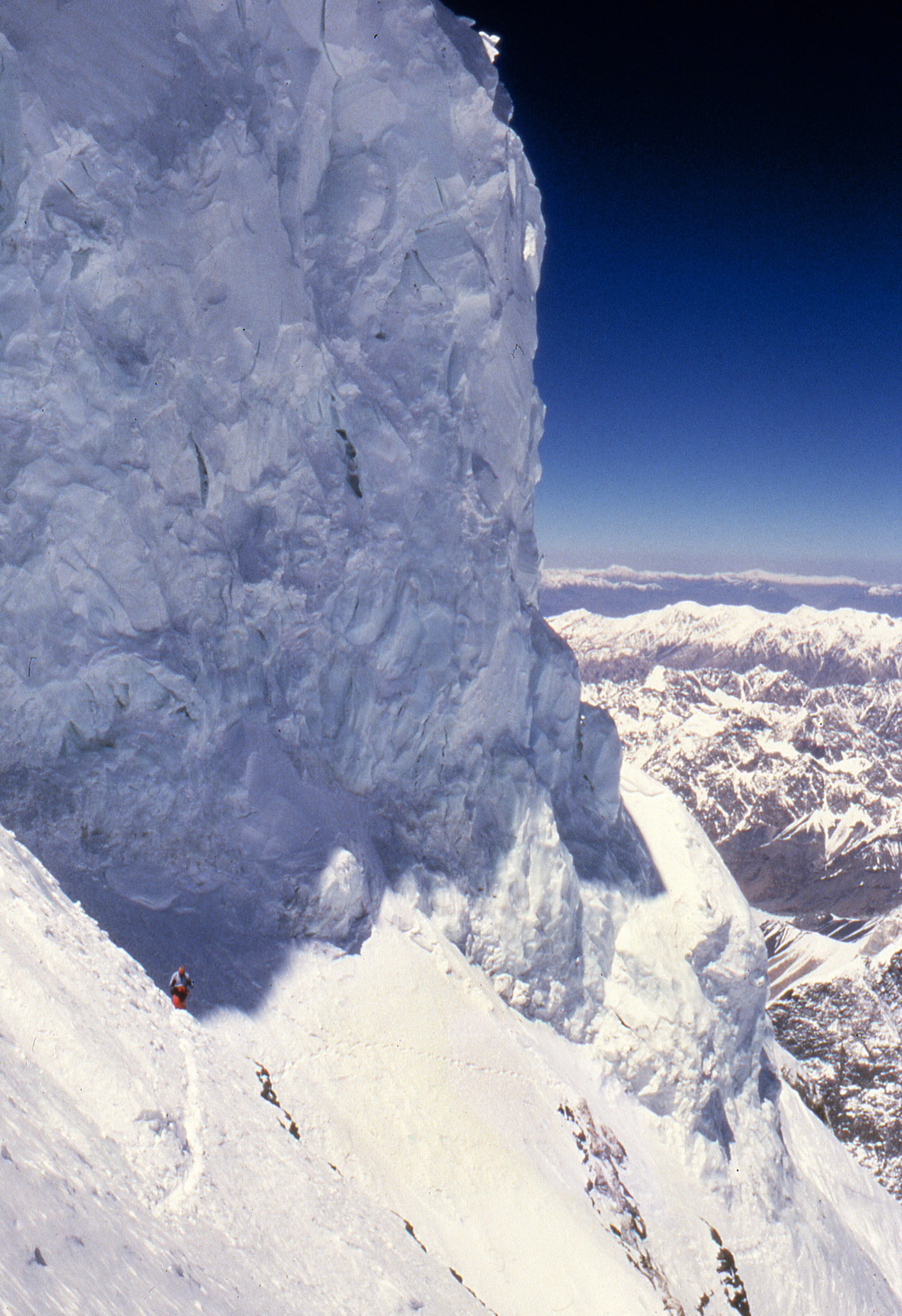
High on K2: Seracs above the Bottleneck

The Bottleneck is a location along the southeast ridge of K2, the second-highest mountain in the world, on the west side of the mountain.

The Bottleneck is a narrow couloir overhung by seracs from the ice field east of the summit. The couloir is located only 400 m (1,300 ft) below the summit, and climbers have to traverse about 100 m (330 ft) while exposed to the seracs to pass it. Due to the height of 8,200 m (26,900 ft), and the steepness of 50 to 60 degrees, this stretch is the most dangerous part of the route. According to AdventureStats, 13 out of the last 14 fatalities on K2 have occurred at or near the Bottleneck.

Despite the danger, the Bottleneck is still technically the easiest and fastest route to the summit. Most climbers choose to use it to minimize time required to spend above 8,000 m (26,000 ft) (the "death zone"). The standard Abruzzi Spur route along the southeast ridge attains the summit via the Bottleneck, as do other routes that join at the ridge, including the Cesen route (SSE ridge, which joins SE ridge) and the NE ridge route (traverse across E face to SE ridge).

The climbers approaching the Bottleneck start from a shoulder on almost level ground just below 8,000 m, where the highest camp is typically located. The bottom end of the couloir drops to the south face of the mountain, and it gradually steepens to 60 degrees just below the ice field. It is not possible to climb up the icefield, which rises straight up tens of metres; instead, a climber must traverse leftwards 100 m (330 ft) at the bottom of the icefield until it is possible to pass it.

It is possible to bypass the Bottleneck by climbing the cliffs on the left. However, due to the technical difficulty of this approach, it has only been done once, by Fritz Wiessner and Pasang Dawa Lama Sherpa on the 1939 American Karakoram expedition.

On August 4, 2009, Dave Watson became the first person to ski down the Bottleneck.

On February 5, 2021, Pakistani mountaineer Muhammad Ali Sadpara, John Snorri of Iceland, and Juan Pablo Mohr of Chile went missing near the Bottleneck. By February 18, 2021, the climbers had been declared dead after rescue and recovery missions conducted by the Pakistani Army failed to spot them. On July 26, 2021, a team of sherpas discovered the dead bodies of the three climbers.

== See also ==
- 2008 K2 disaster
