= Sebastián Rojas =

Peruvian footballer (born 1999)

Personal information
- Full name: Sebastián André Rojas Quesada
- Date of birth: 29 October 1999 (age 27)
- Place of birth: Lima, Peru
- Height: 1.85 m (6 ft 1 in)
- Position: Goalkeeper

Team information
- Current team: Unión Minas

Youth career
- Universitario
- 2018: Melgar

Senior career*
Years	Team	Apps	(Gls)
2018	Melgar	0	(0)
2019–2022	Carlos A. Mannucci	1	(0)
2023	Deportivo Llacuabamba	1	(0)
2024	Deportivo Coopsol	16	(0)
2025	ADA	20	(0)
2026–	Unión Minas	0	(0)
- * Club domestic league appearances and goals as of 19:24, 15 February 2026 (UTC)

Sebastián André Rojas Quesada (born 29 October 1999) is a Peruvian footballer who plays as a goalkeeper for Unión Minas.

== Career ==
=== Club career ===
Rojas is a product of Universitario. He later joined FBC Melgar ahead of the 2018 season. At Melgar, he played for the clubs reserve team, but was also on the bench for one professional game against Sport Boys in June 2018.

Ahead of the 2019 season, Rojas moved to Carlos A. Mannucci. He was mainly playing for the reserve team in his first season. Rojas got his official and professional debut for the club on 5 October 2019 in the Peruvian Primera División against Deportivo Binacional, which was lost 4–0. In the following season, he continued to play for the reserve team and act as reserve goalkeeper for the first team.

In January 2023, Rojas joined Peruvian Segunda División side Deportivo Llacuabamba. In the 2024 season, he moved to Deportivo Coopsol.

In January 2025, Rojas moved to Peruvian Segunda División club ADA. In early 2026, Rojas joined Unión Minas.
