= Sajid Sadpara =

Pakistani mountaineer

Sajid Ali Sadpara
- ساجد علی سدپارہ
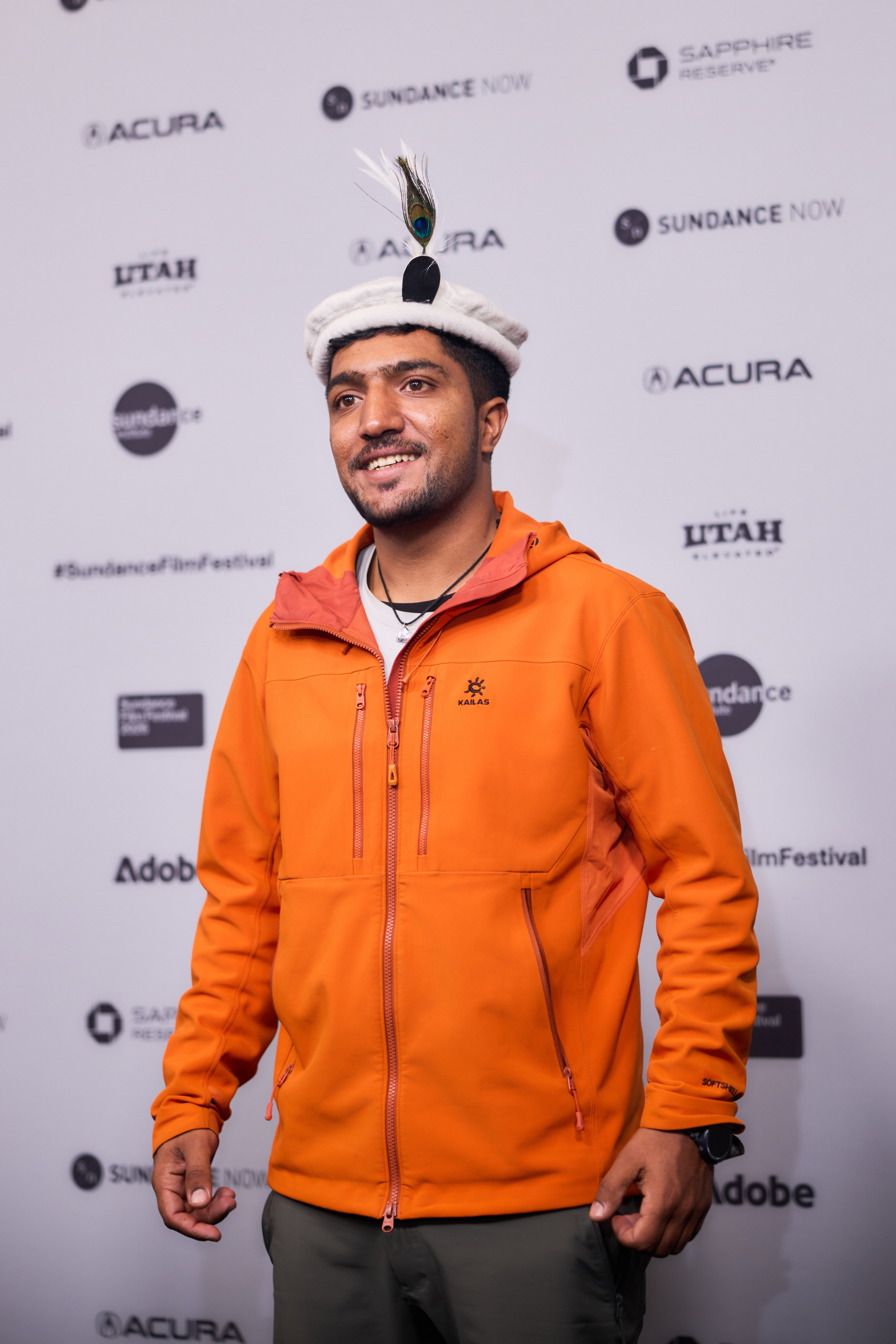
- Sajid Sadpara at the 2026 Sundance Film Festival
- Born: Skardu, Gilgit-Baltistan, Pakistan
- Occupation: Mountaineer
- Parent: Ali Sadpara

Sajid Ali Sadpara (Urdu: ساجد علی سدپارہ) is a Pakistani high-altitude mountaineer.

== Personal life ==
Sajid Sadpara is the son of high-altitude climber Ali Sadpara. In July 2023, Sajid Ali Sadpara, in a team of 5, organised the cleaning of a section of K2, the mountain where his father died.

== Career ==
In July 2021, Sadpara reached the peak of K2 — the world's 2nd highest mountain — for the second time.

In November 2021, Sadpara had to be rescued from Mount Everest after he fell sick during an expedition to explore a new route.

In August 2022, Sadpara summited the 8,035-metre high Gasherbrum-II — the world’s 13th highest mountain.

In September 2022, Sadpara climbed the world's 8th highest peak — the 8,163-metre Manaslu — in Nepal without the aid of supplemental oxygen.

In April 2023, Sadpara became the first Pakistani to climb the 8,091-metre tall Annapurna mountain in Nepal — the world's 10th highest peak — without the support of supplemental oxygen as a part of Seven Summit Treks’ Annapurna Expedition 2023.

In May 2023, Sadpara became the first Pakistani to climb the Mount Everest without supplemental oxygen and assistance from Sherpas.

In June 2023, Sadpara successfully summited the 8126-metre high Nanga Parbat, the 9th highest peak in the world, without supplemental oxygen.
