= Ali Sadpara =

Pakistani mountaineer (1976–2021)

Muhammad Ali Sadpara
- محمد علی سدپارہ
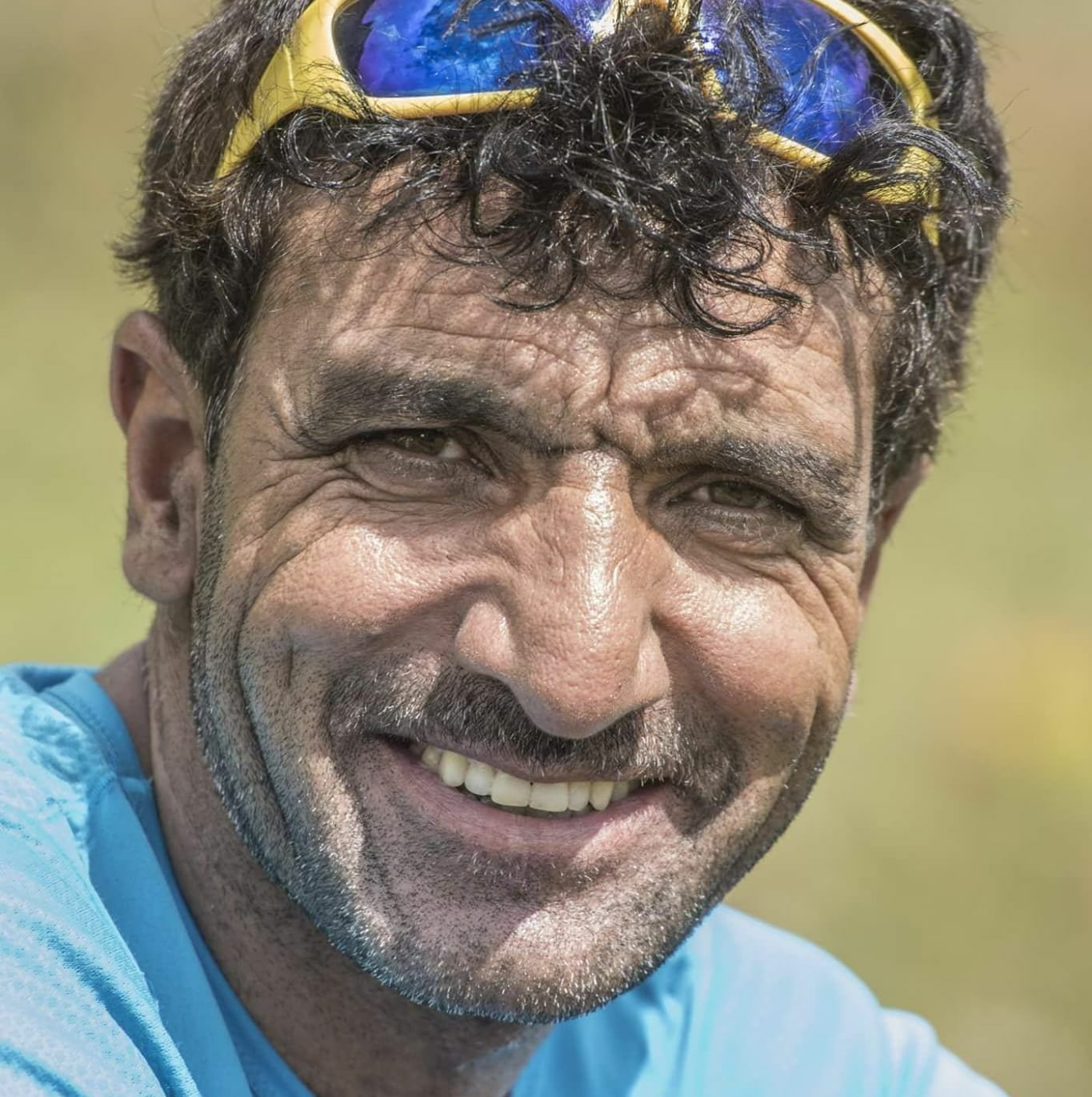
- Sadpara in 2019
- Born: 2 February 1976; Skardu, Gilgit−Baltistan, Pakistan
- Disappeared: 5 February 2021; K2, Pakistan
- Died: c. 5 February 2021 (aged 45) (officially presumed dead at K2 Bottleneck on 18 February 2021)
- Body discovered: 26 July 2021
- Occupation: Mountaineer
- Known for: First winter ascent of Nanga Parbat
- Spouse: Fatima Sadpara
- Children: Sajid Sadpara

Muhammad Ali Sadpara (Urdu: محمد علی سدپارہ; 2 February 1976 – February 2021) was a Pakistani mountaineer. He was part of the team (which included Italian alpinist Simone Moro and Spanish alpinist Alex Txikon) that completed the first winter ascent of Nanga Parbat in 2016. Throughout his career, Sadpara successfully climbed a total of eight eight-thousanders, four of which he ascended in a single calendar year.

== Early life ==
Sadpara was born on 2 February 1976 in the village of Sadpara, located near Skardu in Gilgit−Baltistan, Pakistan. He was the youngest of eleven children, and eight of his siblings did not survive childhood. He married his wife, Fatima, when he was 19 and had his first son, Sajid, shortly afterwards; he had a total of three children. He completed his FA from a government college in Skardu and was a member of his college football team. He began his career as a high-altitude porter, serving as an assistant in mountain-climbing expeditions. Like most other porters, Sadpara traversed the Baltoro Glacier in flip-flops and castoff gear.

== Mountaineering career ==
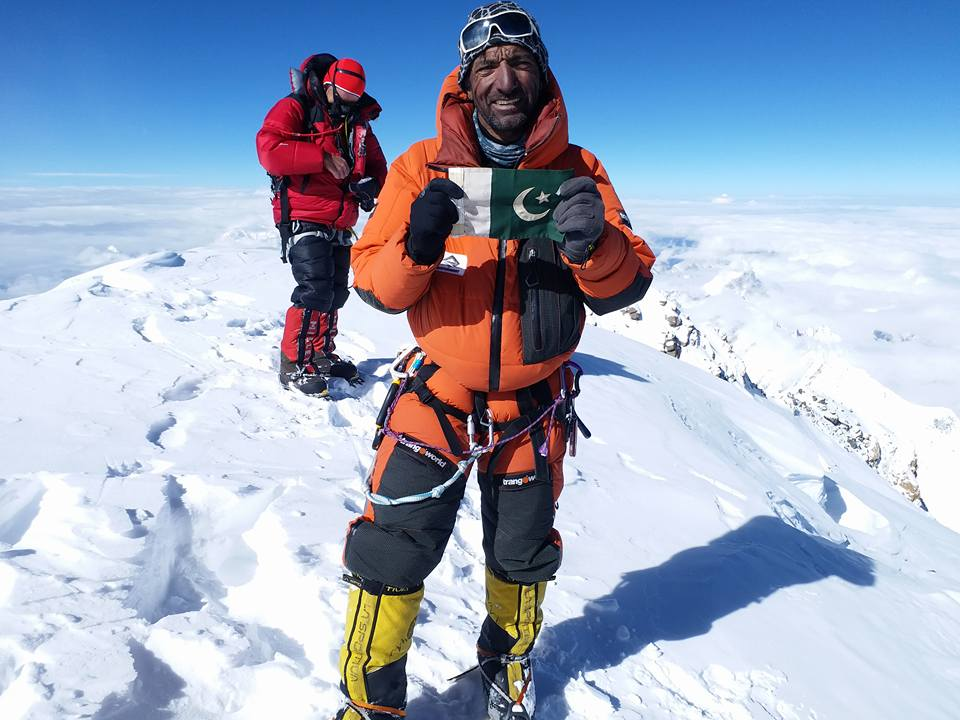
Sadpara on the summit of K2 in August 2018

In 2006, Sadpara climbed his first eight-thousander, Gasherbrum II, located in the Karakoram range.

=== The first winter ascent of Nanga Parbat ===
Before Sadpara, Simone Moro and Alex Txikon made the first-ever winter ascent of Nanga Parbat on 26 February 2016, Nanga Parbat had been attempted by 31 teams in winter however none had been successful.

In 2015, Sadpara made his first winter attempt on Nanga Parbat alongside Alex Txikon. The team reached 7,200 metres but took a wrong turn during the summit bid and lost the route. Sadpara also showed signs of altitude sickness so the team descended.

In 2016, Sadpara returned for another winter attempt on Nanga Parbat. This time he was successful. Sadpara reached the summit on 26 February 2016 at 3.17pm (Pakistan time) alongside Simone Moro and Alex Txikon. This was the first time Nanga Parbat had been successfully climbed during winter. Sadpara also became the first Pakistani to summit an 8,000m mountain during winter. They returned safely to base camp on 27 February. The team had climbed the Kinshofer route on the Diamir side. This ascent was the second-to-last 8,000m mountain to be summited during winter.

Sadpara would successfully summit Nanga Parbat four times in his mountaineering career. The first time in 2008, the second in 2009, the third in 2016 and the fourth in 2017.

=== Everest Winter Attempt (2018) ===
In January 2018, Sadpara joined Basque mountaineer Alex Txikon, in an unsuccessful attempt on Mount Everest during winter without supplemental oxygen. Whilst preparing for Everest, Sadpara and Txikon successfully completed a winter ascent of Pumori. They stood on the summit on 28 January 2018 at 11.29am (Nepal Time).

=== Marc Batard's "Beyond Mount Everest" Project ===
In June 2018, he joined French speed climber Marc Batard to undertake a five-year program known as "Beyond Mount Everest". The pair planned to summit Nanga Parbat, K2 and Mount Everest in 2019, 2021, and 2022, respectively.

List of successful mountaineering ascents
Mountain Name	Range	Country	Year of Ascent	Notes
Gasherbrum II	Karakoram	Pakistan / China	2006	
Golden Peak	Karakoram	Pakistan	2006	
Nanga Parbat	Himalayas	Pakistan	2008	
Muztagh Ata	Pamir	China	2008	
Nanga Parbat	Himalayas	Pakistan	2009	
Gasherbrum I	Karakoram	Pakistan / China	2010	
Nanga Parbat	Himalayas	Pakistan	2016	First winter ascent
Broad Peak	Karakoram	Pakistan / China	2017	
Nanga Parbat	Himalayas	Pakistan	2017	First autumn ascent
Pumori	Himalayas	Nepal / China	2017	
K2	Karakoram	Pakistan / China	2018	
Lhotse	Himalayas	Nepal / China	2019	
Makalu	Himalayas	Nepal / China	2019	
Manaslu	Himalayas	Nepal	2019	

=== Final climb ===
During the winter season of 2020–2021, Sadpara, along with his 21-year-old son Sajid (who had also climbed K2 in 2019), teamed up with Icelandic mountaineer John Snorri Sigurjónsson and Chilean mountaineer Juan Pablo Mohr Prieto for a joint ascent of K2. After acclimatising, the team left the highest camp on the evening of 4 February 2021. Sajid was later forced to descend due to an oxygen regulator malfunction, leaving the other members of the team at the K2 Bottleneck, close to the summit. Sadpara, Sigurjónsson, and Prieto continued their ascent to K2's summit, but did not return by night as planned, and were declared missing on 5 February 2021. A rescue mission with two Pakistan Army helicopters was organised on 6 February 2021 to search for the team.

On 18 February 2021, Pakistani authorities announced that the three men were officially presumed dead, but the search for their remains would continue. Sadpara's family also declared him as presumably dead on the same day. On 26 July 2021, three bodies believed to be of the missing mountaineers were found on the slopes above Camp 4. Sadpara's body was found around 300 meters (980 ft) below the K2 Bottleneck. The bodies were found by a Madison Mountaineering Sherpa Team that was fixing ropes above the camp. Sajid then retrieved the bodies of the three missing climbers including his father.

== Tributes ==
- A climbing wall named after Sadpara was inaugurated at Qayyum Stadium, Peshawar.
- US based NGO Paani Project built a well in honour of Sadpara.
- Pakistan International Airlines renamed its air safari in the honour of Ali Sadpara.
- A park in Korangi, Karachi was made in honour of Sadpara.
- Sadpara was honoured with a monument at MP Chowk in Somikot, Gilgit. The roundabout was also renamed to Sadpara Chowk.

== See also ==
- List of solved missing person cases (2020s)
- List of unsolved deaths
