= Cristina Castagna =

Italian mountainier (1977–2009)

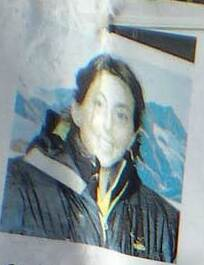
- Born: 23 December 1977; San Quirico, Valdagno, Italy
- Died: 18 July 2009 (aged 31); Broad Peak, Pakistan-China
- Other name: El Grio
- Occupations: nurse, mountaineer
- Known for: mountaineering

Cristina "El Grio" Castagna (23 December 1977 – 18 July 2009) was an Italian mountaineer and the first Italian woman to climb Makalu. She died in 2009 on Broad Peak, after reaching the summit.

== Early life ==
Castagna was born near San Quirico di Valdagno, near Vicenza. Youngest of four children, during her childhood, she began discovering mountains with her father and her uncle. After a technical degree she became a nurse in the ER hospital in Vicenza, a job she kept for all her life.

During her childhood, Castagna was very active, so her father gave her the nickname "Grio" (Cricket). She liked the nickname so much she kept it in her adult life ("El Grio") often in conjunction with "acchiappasogni" (dreamcatcher). She was also an avid reader and writer. After she became the first Italian woman to climb Makalu, she began to appear on Italian national news and newspapers. Nevertheless, she kept working as a nurse, climbing in her spare time, and initially at her own expense.

After a brief interest in volleyball, in her twenties she began climbing and ski mountaineering with Club Alpino Italiano (CAI). Although she had several sponsors, and was a member of the Salewa AlpineXtrem team, she never became a fully professional climber by status. She also worked as a nurse with the Alpini, and was enrolled with the National Alpini Association and Club Alpino Italiano.

== Climbing achievements ==
Castagna was the first Italian woman to climb Makalu and at the time of her death, remained the youngest Italian woman to climb an eight-thousander (Shishapangma) at 27 years. In 2003, during an expedition headed by Tarcisio Bellò along with Mario Vielmo], she met Giampaolo Casarotto, who would later be her climbing partner for many expeditions. The Mount Everest attempt ended at 7,800 metres (25,600 ft)

In 2004 she climbed again with Vielmo, this time to the summit of Shishapangma, along with Michele Fait. In 2005 she climbed Gasherbrum II, alongside Gerlinde Kaltenbrunner In 2006 she attempted to climb Lhotse, again with [and Silvio Mondinelli, Marco Confortola and Giampaolo Corona. However, cold weather and frostbite drove her back at 8,120 metres (26,640 ft). In 2008 came the successful Makalu attempt, with Casarotto. At 8,000 metres (26,000 ft) she was struck by the cold but met Waldemar Nicleviczand Irivan Burda who helped her. On 11 May she became the first Italian woman to reach the summit of Makalu, but suffered seriously frostbitten feet that would leave her in hospital for weeks.

In her last trip, she planned to climb both Broad Peak and Gasherbrum I along with Casarotto, but died during the descent after reaching the summit of Broad Peak. The Italian press agency Ansa mentioned her death in the prominent events of 2009 for Italy.

== Broad Peak incident ==
Castagna and Giampaolo Casarotto planned to climb Broad Peak and Gasherbrum I in their 2009 expedition. Before leaving home, in a note later found by relatives, Castagna asked to be left on the mountains in case of severe accident.

The same day Fabrizio Zangrilli, Benedikt Böhm and Sebastian Haag from the Dynafit Gore-Tex-Team were climbing the mountain and spent a few stops with the Italian duo. On 18 July at 3 pm local time, Castagna and Casarotto reached the summit, despite severe weather conditions that had slowed the two climbers for nearly ten hours. During the descent, at 7,800 metres (25,600 ft), Castagna slipped down, gaining momentum and stopping several metres below in a crevasse. Giampaolo Casarotto eventually managed to reach and try to rescue her, to no avail. Her body is at 7,800 metres (25,600 ft), making recovery difficult for helicopters. The family, following her last will, decided to not attempt a recovery, thus avoiding risking other mountaineers' and porters' lives.

Castagna was remembered during an Italian Senate meeting by Lega Nord senators Paolo Franco and Gianvittore Vaccari. A month after Castagna's death, following an Italian expedition in Hindu Kush, Tarcisio Bellò solo-climbed an unnamed peak and named it after her.

=== Notable climbs ===
- Aconcagua, Argentina, 2003
- Shishapangma, Tibet, 2004, at 27 the youngest Italian woman to successfully climb an Eight thousander
- Gasherbrum II, Pakistan-China, 2005
- Lhotse, Nepal, 2006 (did not reach summit)
- Dhaulagiri, Nepal, 2007
- Makalu, Nepal-Tibet, 2008, first Italian woman to climb Makalu
- Broad Peak, Pakistan-China, 2009 (died during descent)

== Humanitarian work ==
In 1999 Castagna served as a nurse in Valona during Italian government humanitarian mission "Missione Arcobaleno" in Albania. An eye hospital service, specialized in early cataract treatment, has since been created in Alepe, Ivory Coast to remember Castagna.

== Places and routes ==
- Cristina Castagna peak, 5.311 metres (17.42 ft) Hindu Kush, first ascent by Tarcisio Bellò, August 10, 2009
- Cristina Castagna eye service, Alepè, Ivory Coast, an eye hospital.
- Cristina Castagna mountaineering Center, Gothulti, Pakistan, in progress.
- Via Fragile Esistenza (route in memory of Castagna), Campanile di Scagina, Piccole Dolomiti, Veneto, Italy. By Mario Brighente, Simone Gianesin, Bottegal, Gino Dal Cero, 2009

== Books ==
On 1, July 2010 CAI Valdagno and Recoaro Terme sections published a biography by Massimo Fontana, on Castagna's life and achievements.

== See also ==
- Nives Meroi
- Edurne Pasaban
- Gerlinde Kaltenbrunner
- Iñaki Ochoa de Olza
- Broad Peak
