= Marca Leyenda =

Spanish award

Marca Leyenda (Marca legend) is an award given by the Spanish sports newspaper Marca to the best sport professionals in history. Since its inception in 1997 over 80 people have received this award.

== List of winners ==
Date	Winner	Sport
3 November 2026	(Spain) Carolina Marín	Badminton
1 June 2026	(Norway) Johannes Høsflot Klæbo	Cross-country skiing
13 December 2025	(Georgia (country)) Ilia Topuria	Mixed martial arts
25 November 2025	(Spain) Carlos Soria Fontán	Mountaineering
25 September 2025	(Argentina) Fernando Belasteguín	Padel
27 May 2025	(Spain) Saúl Craviotto	Canoeing
6 March 2025	(Spain) Toni Bou	Motorcycle sport
24 January 2024	(Spain) Sandra Sánchez	Karate
27 July 2023	(Italy) Sergio Scariolo	Basketball
1 June 2023	(France) Karim Benzema	Football
24 March 2023	(Brazil) Ronaldinho	Football
22 February 2023	(Cuba) Iván Pedroso	Athletics
10 June 2022	(Italy) Pierluigi Collina	Football
18 May 2022	(Croatia) Luka Modrić	Football
16 May 2022	(Spain) Jesús Ángel García	Athletics
30 December 2021	(United States) Simone Biles	Artistic gymnastics
18 December 2020	(New Zealand) Russell Coutts	Sailing
29 January 2020	(United States) Mike Powell	Athletics
16 November 2019	(Spain) Sergio García	Golf
29 July 2019	(Portugal) Cristiano Ronaldo	Football
7 March 2019	(Spain) Javier Fernández	Figure skating
14 December 2018	(Spain) Juan Carlos Navarro	Basketball
8 November 2018	(United States) Bob Beamon	Athletics
4 April 2018	(Mexico) Hugo Sánchez	Football
11 December 2017	(Spain) Marc Márquez	Motorcycle sport
14 December 2016	(Spain) Luis Suárez	Football
13 September 2016	(Spain) Ruth Beitia	Athletics
1 May 2016	(Serbia) Novak Djokovic	Tennis
2 December 2015	(Spain) Xavi	Football
29 November 2015	(Spain) José María Olazábal	Golf
7 October 2015	(Spain) Teresa Perales	Swimming
5 May 2015	(Spain) David Cal	Canoe racing
2 October 2014	(Spain) Kilian Jornet	Trail running
24 September 2014	(Spain) Javier Gómez Noya	Triathlon
12 February 2014	(Spain) Marcelino	Football
28 September 2012	(United States) Kelly Slater	Surfer
27 September 2012	(Spain) Luis Arconada	Football
15 June 2012	(Spain) Quini	Football
2 June 2012	(Spain) Fernando Torres	Football
14 March 2012	(Germany) Franz Beckenbauer	Football
10 November 2011	(Spain) Fernando Hierro	Football
8 August 2011	(Spain) Andrés Iniesta	Football
14 April 2011	(Italy) Fabio Capello	Football
1 April 2011	(Brazil) Ronaldo	Football
18 January 2011	(Spain) Ángel María Villar	Football
18 January 2011	(Spain) Vicente del Bosque	Football
16 December 2010	(United States) David Stern	Basketball
27 November 2010	(Spain) Fernando Alonso	Auto racing
2 November 2010	(Spain) Jorge Lorenzo	Motorcycle sport
2 June 2010	(United States) Kareem Abdul-Jabbar	Basketball
27 May 2010	(Spain) Edurne Pasaban	Mountaineering
18 March 2010	(United States) Muhammad Ali	Boxing
17 November 2009	(Italy) Paolo Maldini	Football
19 October 2009	(Brazil) Kaká	Football
24 September 2009	(Italy) Luca Cordero di Montezemolo	Auto racing
31 August 2009	(Jamaica) Usain Bolt	Athletics
30 June 2009	(Spain) Federico Martín Bahamontes	Road bicycle racing
29 April 2009	(Argentina) Lionel Messi	Football
3 March 2009	(Spain) Raúl González	Football
15 December 2008	(Spain) Rafael Nadal	Tennis
15 December 2008	(Spain) Juan Carlos I	Others
24 October 2008	(Italy) Valentino Rossi	Motorcycle sport
20 August 2008	(United States) Michael Phelps	Swimming
1 July 2008	(Spain) Luis Aragonés	Football
30 January 2008	(France) Zinedine Zidane	Football
5 December 2007	(Spain) Francisco Gento	Football
18 October 2007	(Switzerland) Roger Federer	Tennis
25 September 2006	(Spain) Pau Gasol	Basketball
7 July 2005	(United States) John McEnroe	Tennis
6 March 2005	(Ukraine) Sergey Bubka	Athletics
28 January 2005	(Ethiopia) Haile Gebrselassie	Athletics
25 November 2004	(Spain) Manolo Santana	Tennis
18 October 2004	(United States) Andre Agassi	Tennis
22 May 2002	(Japan) Daijiro Kato	Motorcycle sport
2 April 2002	(United States) Mark Spitz	Swimming
6 January 2002	(United States) Magic Johnson	Basketball
4 June 2001	(Spain) Juanito Oiarzabal	Mountaineering
1 March 2001	(Germany) Michael Schumacher	Auto racing
26 July 2000	(Belgium) Eddy Merckx	Road bicycle racing
7 May 2000	(Austria) Niki Lauda	Auto racing
26 December 1999	(United States) Carl Lewis	Athletics
11 November 1999	(Spain) Ángel Nieto	Motorcycle sport
5 October 1999	(Argentina) Alfredo Di Stéfano	Football
1 October 1999	(Argentina) Diego Armando Maradona	Football
21 September 1999	(Spain) Juan Antonio Samaranch	International Olympic Committee
21 June 1999	(Netherlands) Johan Cruyff	Football
11 January 1999	(Spain) Seve Ballesteros	Golf
27 November 1998	(United States) Pete Sampras	Tennis
20 July 1998	(Spain) Arantxa Sánchez Vicario	Tennis
17 June 1998	(Italy) Alberto Tomba	Alpine skiing
28 March 1998	(Spain) Carlos Sainz	Auto racing
23 March 1998	(Romania) Nadia Comăneci	Artistic gymnastics
22 January 1998	(Spain) Manel Estiarte	Waterpolo
18 December 1997	(Russia) Garry Kasparov	Chess
11 December 1997	(Spain) Miguel Indurain	Road bicycle racing
27 November 1997	(Australia) Michael Doohan	Motorcycle sport
15 November 1997	(Brazil) Pelé	Football
16 October 1997	(United States) Michael Jordan	Basketball
