= Oh Eun-sun =

South Korean mountaineer (born 1966)

- Oh Eun-sun meeting with President Lee Myung-bak in 2013
- Born: March 5, 1966 (age 60); Namwon, South Korea
- Occupation: Mountaineer
- Known for: First South Korean woman to climb the Seven Summits
- Height: 5 ft 1 in (1.55 m)

Korean name
- Hangul: 오은선
- Hanja: 吳銀善
- RR: O Eunseon
- MR: O Ŭnsŏn

Oh Eun-sun (Korean: 오은선; Hanja: 吳銀善, born March 5, 1966) is a South Korean mountaineer. She was the first South Korean woman to climb the Seven Summits. On April 27, 2010, she reached the summit of Annapurna; upon doing so, she claimed to have climbed all fourteen eight-thousanders, which would have made her the first woman to achieve this feat. However, her claim to have ascended Kangchenjunga was disputed by multiple experts. Oh later admitted that she had stopped a few hundred meters before the summit of Kangchenjunga, and so the Korean Alpine Federation ruled that she had not summited. The mountaineering site ExplorersWeb officially considers the Basque Edurne Pasaban as the first woman to have successfully climbed all fourteen peaks.

== Early life and education ==
Oh was born in Namwon, North Jeolla Province. Before taking up climbing, she studied engineering at the University of Suwon in Gyeonggi Province. After completing the 14 eight-thousanders, she said she would take a break from climbing for three to four years. "The last few years have been too tiring, now I am going to rest," she said. She planned to attend graduate school and do charity work during her break.

== Career ==
=== Race to complete all 14 eight-thousanders ===
On July 17, 1997, Oh summited Gasherbrum II without supplementary oxygen, completing her first climb to a summit of over 8,000 meters. Over the next several years, she attempted several eight-thousanders without success. In 2004, she climbed Mount Everest with the aid of supplementary oxygen. In 2006, she added scaling Shishapangma to her list of accomplishments. At the time, two women, Edurne Pasabán and Gerlinde Kaltenbrunner, had completed nine different eight-thousanders to Oh's three. In 2007, she conquered Cho Oyu and K2, bringing her total 8000ers to five. Two other women achieved their 10th such climb that year. In 2008, Oh added four more 8000+ meter climbs, while the leaders in the chase for all 14 added only one each.

On May 6, 2009, Oh claimed to have summited Kangchenjunga, the world's third-highest mountain (see below). In so doing, she became just the third woman to conquer the mountain and first from Korea. The accomplishment also made her the first woman to scale the world's five highest peaks. It was her 10th different 8000er. On August 3, 2009, Oh reached the summit of Gasherbrum I after a twelve-hour climb from Camp 3.

In April 2010, Oh made her second attempt at climbing Annapurna, the last of the eight-thousanders. A previous attempt in October 2009 came up 500 meters short when a blizzard made further ascent impossible. As she approached the top, strong winds and snow delayed further ascent. On April 23, Oh reached camp C3, located at 6,400 m, but was forced to retreat the next day due to wind. She announced that she would delay her summit attempt. On April 26, Oh took 11 hours to climb from C2 (5,600m) to C4. On April 27, 2010, Oh left camp C4 located at 7,200 meters on Annapurna. Thirteen hours later, she reached the summit at 3:15pm local time, completing her quest. Upon reaching the peak, she planted a South Korean flag, waved to the camera which was broadcasting the climb live, and thanked her fellow Koreans for being with her throughout the whole expedition. She was accompanied by five other climbers. Congratulating Oh on her accomplishment, South Korean president Lee Myung-bak said, "She showed us what challenge means". Oh completed her descent from Annapurna on May 3.

==== Accomplishment disputed ====
Oh's 2009 summit of Kangchenjunga has been questioned, throwing her accomplishment into doubt. The dispute stems from a photograph said to have been taken by Oh at the summit which is too blurry to confirm exactly where she stood when she took it. The photo is the only visible evidence she has of her ascent. After doubts were first raised in Korea, Oh held a press conference in which she tearfully remarked that the blurriness "was unavoidable due to fog and a violent snowstorm." One of the Sherpas who accompanied her on the climb assured the media that he knew the layout of the mountain well from previous climbs and that Oh had indeed made the summit.

In April 2010, Oh's main rival, Edurne Pasaban from Spain, who was also aiming to become the first woman to climb all fourteen eight-thousanders, weighed in on the controversy. Pasabán spoke with Oh and her team while descending Annapurna, Pasabán's thirteenth eight-thousander. After Pasabán spoke with Elizabeth Hawley upon descending, Hawley agreed to mark Oh's summit of Kangchenjunga as "disputed" in her Himalayan Database. On April 24, Hawley explained her decision, "The only picture that anyone has seen shows Miss Oh standing on bare rock. But Miss Pasabán (who was on the mountain at the same time) showed me a picture of her team on the summit, and they are standing on snow." She added that "of the three Sherpas that climbed with Miss Oh, two have said she did not reach the summit." The latter comment apparently stems from conversations Pasabán had with said Sherpas while on Annapurna. Although her data was unofficial, Hawley was considered the final arbiter on such disputes. At the time of Hawley's death in 2018, she counted the record as valid, but had planned to do further research. Ferran Latorre, a Spanish climber, claimed that the green rope affixed to the mountain by Oh's team (visible in the picture) stopped 200 meters short of the summit. Eberhard Jurgalski of 8000ers.com, a website devoted to keeping mountaineering records, said, "It's all mixed up, you cannot say what is true and what's invented." On April 27, 2010, Nepal Mountaineering Association president Ang Tshering said, "We recognize [Oh's] achievement as the first woman climber to scale all the highest mountains in the world." 8000ers.com also credits Oh with having completed all fourteen eight-thousanders. The Nepalese government also stated that it believes Oh climbed Kangchenjunga.

ExplorersWeb looked into the disputed summit in detail in 2009, before it made headlines, and concluded that the dispute was based largely on third parties confusing Go Mi-young's team, who was climbing at the same time, with Oh's, and a misunderstanding about the starting point of Oh's final push. The organization concluded that "doubts about Miss Oh's Kanchen summit were not backed by enough fact", but said it would be happy to review any new evidence the involved parties had to offer. Reinhold Messner, the first person to climb all fourteen eight-thousanders, also acknowledged Oh's achievement after meeting with her.

==== Response ====
On April 26, Oh's sponsor responded on her behalf while she was climbing Annapurna. According to a press release by Black Yak, there were several teams on the mountain at the time and none of them doubted Oh's summit then. At the time, Pasabán herself wrote "Korean Oh Eun Sun just reached the top in spite of the wind." The release goes on to say the Kangchenjunga summit is not visible by telescope even during good weather, so it was not surprising no one can visually verify Oh's summit. It states that Oh was last seen at 8,400 m 3 hours and 40 minutes before the claimed summit time. Veteran climbers have said that that is a realistic time frame. Finally, according to the release, the final 200 meters of the mountain are "comparatively gentle, so fixed rope is not a necessary option". Others, including Pasabán, have scaled that portion of the mountain without the use of fixed rope. For her part, Pasabán remarked, "I am confused. Had I known this so-called race was going to be such a mess, I would have thought twice before getting involved."

After descending from Annapurna, Oh addressed the allegations on May 3. "I am really sad that it has come to this," she said. Oh claimed that Korea's KBS Television had video and picture evidence of her summit that had not yet been made public. Rejecting Pasabán's claims, Oh added, "I believe that according to Pasabán, some Sherpas told her that I hadn't climbed Kangchenjunga. But no names of the Sherpas have been mentioned. Why?" On May 4, Pasabán specified the names of seven Sherpas involved. She declined to give these names earlier as some of these Sherpas were still working for Oh. Oh has no plans to re-climb Kangchenjunga.

==== Acknowledgement by Hawley ====
On May 3, 2009, Oh had an hour-long discussion with Elizabeth Hawley in Kathmandu, in which she asked Oh about the details of her Kangchenjunga climb. At the conclusion of the interview, Hawley asked Oh if she had really conquered all 14 eight-thousanders, to which Oh replied. "Yes, I did." Hawley reportedly replied "Congratulations", indicating the feat would continue to be acknowledged. "Oh will be credited for her climb to Kangchenjunga," she later told the press. "Her account was completely different from Pasabán's so I really don't know who is right," she added. Hawley's database will continue to list the climb as disputed unless Pasabán withdraws her complaint. Pasabán had previously said she would respect Hawley's decision either way. On May 23 Pasabán conceded that she was the second woman to climb world's 14 highest peaks, but still questioned whether Oh actually held the record.

Hawley stated "I think it's likely that Miss Oh's climb is going to be disputed for the rest of her life" and that evidence was "piling up" against her.

==== Korean Alpine Federation statement ====
On August 26, 2010, the Korean Alpine Federation (KAF) judged that Oh "probably failed" to reach the top of Kangchenjunga. The KAF secretary general, Lee Eui-jae, said participants in the meeting all shared the view that Miss Oh's photographs on Kangchenjunga did not "seem to match the actual landscape" and that "Oh's previous explanations on the process of her ascent to Kangchenjunga are unreliable".

Oh responded to the verdict by describing it as "a unilateral opinion" and adding that all participants in the meeting - seven Korean climbers who had scaled Kangchenjunga previously - "were climbers who had doubts about my achievement from the beginning, so their conclusion must have been already set".

Hawley declared, "it would seem her only choice now is to go back and climb it again with lots of clear photos".

==== Next team to reach the peak ====
BBC News also reported on 27 August 2010 that "A member of the next team to reach the peak of Kangchenjunga, in May 2009, the Norwegian climber Jon Gangdal, says he found Ms Oh's Korean flag weighed down by stones, some 50m or 60m below the summit."

==== Climbing strategy and inspiration ====
Oh has used helicopters to travel between base camps, and employed teams to prepare for her ascents in advance. She is under the sponsorship of Black Yak, a South Korean outdoor product maker. She has been nicknamed "Iron Woman" and "Squirrel" for her climbing accomplishments. Oh was criticized for failing to come to the aid of ailing Spanish climber Tolo Calafat, who died on Annapurna while waiting for help. Oh responded that she was unaware that Calafat was sick until after she had descended and was no longer able to help. "We reached the summit around 3 p.m. and the Spanish climber got there an hour later. By the time we got back down to Camp 4 we were all exhausted," Oh said, adding that she "really wanted" to help but was "not in a state to climb [the seven hours back] up the slopes and rescue him."

Oh lists former rival Go Mi-young, who plummeted to her death in 2009 after completing 11 eight-thousanders, as a source of inspiration. She has described mountain climbing as a sort of "addiction, which is much stronger than any drug."

== Mountaineering accomplishments ==
| Date | Eight-thousanders |
|---|---|
| July 17, 1997 | Gasherbrum II |
| May 20, 2004 | Everest (with supplementary oxygen) |
| October 3, 2006 | Shishapangma |
| May 8, 2007 | Cho Oyu |
| July 20, 2007 | K2 (with supplementary oxygen) |
| May 13, 2008 | Makalu |
| May 26, 2008 | Lhotse |
| July 31, 2008 | Broad Peak |
| October 12, 2008 | Manaslu |
| May 21, 2009 | Dhaulagiri |
| July 10, 2009 | Nanga Parbat |
| October 3, 2009 | Gasherbrum I |
| April 27, 2010 | Annapurna |

| Year | Seven Summits |
|---|---|
| 2002 | Elbrus |
| 2003 | Denali |
| 2004 | Aconcagua |
| 2004 | Kilimanjaro |
| 2004 | Vinson Massif |
| 2004 | Kosciuszko |
| 2004 | Everest |
