= Kinga Baranowska =

Polish mountaineer (born 1975)

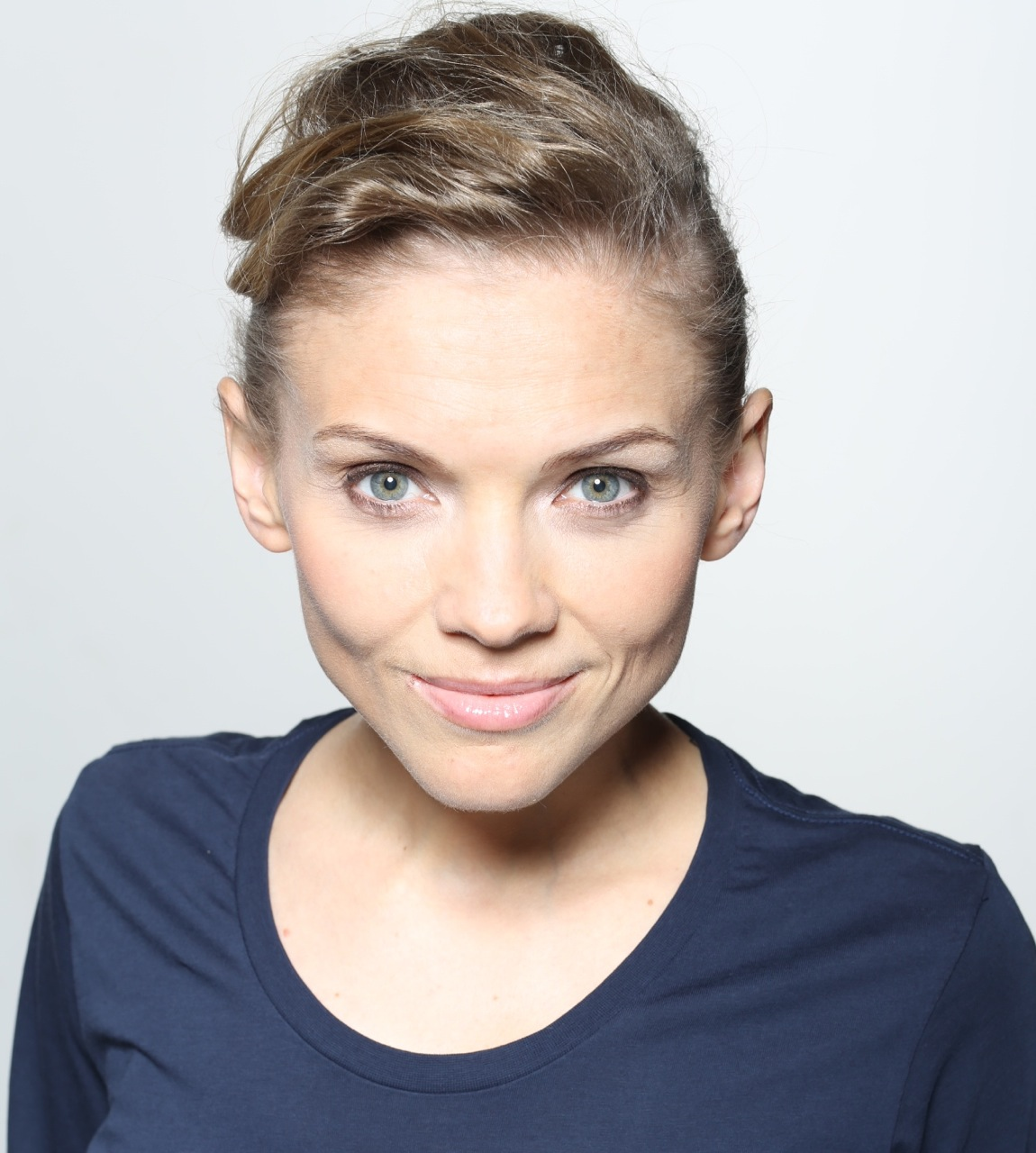
- Kinga Baranowska, 2016
- Born: 17 November 1975 (age 50); Wejherowo, Poland
- Occupation: Mountaineer

Kinga Baranowska (born 17 November 1975 in Wejherowo) is a Polish mountaineer. She made ascents of nine eight-thousanders and is the first Polish woman to have climbed Dhaulagiri, Manaslu and Kangchenjunga. She has also climbed the seven summits.

== Climbing career ==
Baranowska summited her first eight-thousander, Cho Oyu, in 2003. She failed on an attempt to reach one of the most difficult seven-thousanders, Jengish Chokusu in Tian-Shan range. In 2006, she successfully reached the top of Broad Peak. On June 11, 2007, she summited Denali, following this up just five weeks later - on July 18 - with a successful climb of Nanga Parbat. One year later, she summited Dhaulagiri (May 1, 2008) – her first attempt to reach the summit from north-east face, in September 2007, failed.

Baranowska summited Dhaulagiri along with other prominent climbers on May 1, 2008. Fellow summiteers included: Ivan Vallejo (his 14th 8000er), Ferrán Latorre, Nacho Orviz, Fernando Gonzalez-Rubio, Edurne Pasaban (her 10th 8000er), Gerlinde Kaltenbrunner (her 11th 8000er), David Göttler, Carlos Pauner (his 8th 8000er), Marta Alejandre, Asier izaguirre, Alex Txicon, Muptu Sherpa and Kinga Baranowska Dhaulagiri in 40 km/h winds, thunder and lightning on the summit.

On 18 May 2009, Baranowska became the first Polish woman (Alpinus Expedition Team, KW Warsaw) to summit Kangchenjunga (8586 m), which is located on the India-Nepal border. Kangchenjunga has been summited in high winds - however, descent on Kang is reportedly very difficult.

Baranowska is the first Polish female climber to reach the collective summits of Dhaulagiri, Manaslu and Kangchenjunga. Baranowska's summits include: Cho Oyu (8201 m) - October, 2003; Broad Peak (8047 m) - July 22, 2006 - the 11th female ascent; Nanga Parbat (8125 m) July 18, 2007; Dhaulagiri (8167 m) May 1, 2008; Manaslu (8156 m) October 5, 2008; Kangchenjunga (8586 m) May 18, 2009; Annapurna (8091 m) April 27, 2010; Lhotse (8516 m) May 25, 2012; Gasherbrum II (8035 m) July 17, 2015. She attempted Makalu (8481 m) in May 2013, but failed to reach summit due to early monsoon.

She climbs without the use of supplemental oxygen.

== Recognition ==
On 25 April 2015, she received Golden Cross of Merit from President Bronisław Komorowski for her contributions to the promotion of alpinism and Poland's image abroad.

== See also ==
- Jerzy Kukuczka
- Wanda Rutkiewicz
- Krzysztof Wielicki
- Adam Bielecki
