= Go Mi-young =

South Korean mountaineer (1967–2009)

- Born: Go Mi-young; March 3, 1967; Buan, South Korea
- Died: July 11, 2009 (aged 42); Nanga Parbat, Pakistan
- Occupation: Mountaineer
- Known for: Participated in a competition to become the first woman to climb eight-thousanders

Korean name
- Hangul: 고미영
- Hanja: 高美英
- RR: Go Miyeong
- MR: Ko Miyŏng

Go Mi-young (Korean: 고미영; Hanja: 高美英; March 3, 1967 – July 11, 2009) was a South Korean mountaineer.

Together with the Korean mountaineer Jae-Soo Kim, she became one of the first climbers to summit three 8,000-metre peaks in a single season when they climbed Makalu, Kangchenjunga, and Dhaulagiri in six weeks. In 2007, she summited Everest. On July 11, 2009, after reaching the top of Nanga Parbat, she fell off a cliff on the descent in bad weather and was later found dead. At the time of her death, she was in the quest to become the first woman to scale the world's 14 highest peaks (the eight-thousanders), competing against the Korean climber Oh Eun-sun and Basque Spanish climber Edurne Pasaban, who later achieved this goal.
