= Tolo Calafat =

Spanish mountaineer

Bartolomé “Tolo” Calafat Marcus
- Born: 14 September 1970; Palma de Mallorca, Spain
- Died: 29 April 2010 (aged 39); Annapurna
- Cause of death: Exhaustion, edema
- Resting place: Annapurna, 7400 m
- Occupations: Electrical engineer, alpinist
- Years active: 2004-2010
- Known for: Mountaineering
- Children: 2

Bartolomé "Tolo" Calafat Marcus (17 September 1970 Palma de Mallorca — 29 April 2010, Annapurna) was a Spanish climber. In his career, Calafat reached the summit of five eight-thousanders, Cho Oyu, Mount Everest, Broad Peak, Shishapangma and Annapurna. In 2010, Calafat died while descending Annapurna on an expedition led by Juanito Oiarzabal.

== Biography ==
Calafat grew up on Palma de Mallorca and worked as a telecommunications engineer. He became involved in athletics at an early age, later moving to triathlons and helped initiate some of the early mountain racing competitions in Mallorca and the Baleric Islands.

=== Mountaineering ===
Calafat first began mountain climbing close to home on Mallorca's Serra de Tramuntana. Not long after he would climb in the Alps and then make expeditions to Argentina's Aconcagua and Peru's Cordillera Blanca. In 2004, he first climbed in the Himalayas, successfully summiting Cho Oyu. In 2006, he summited Mount Everest. Calafat reached the summit of Mount Everest on May 18, 2006, with Juan Antonio Olivieri 'Oli', a fellow Baleric mountaineer. They would be the first from the Balearics to summit the world's highest peak. Calafat would additionally make successful summits of Shishapangma and Broad Peak before attempting his next eight-thousander, Annapurna.

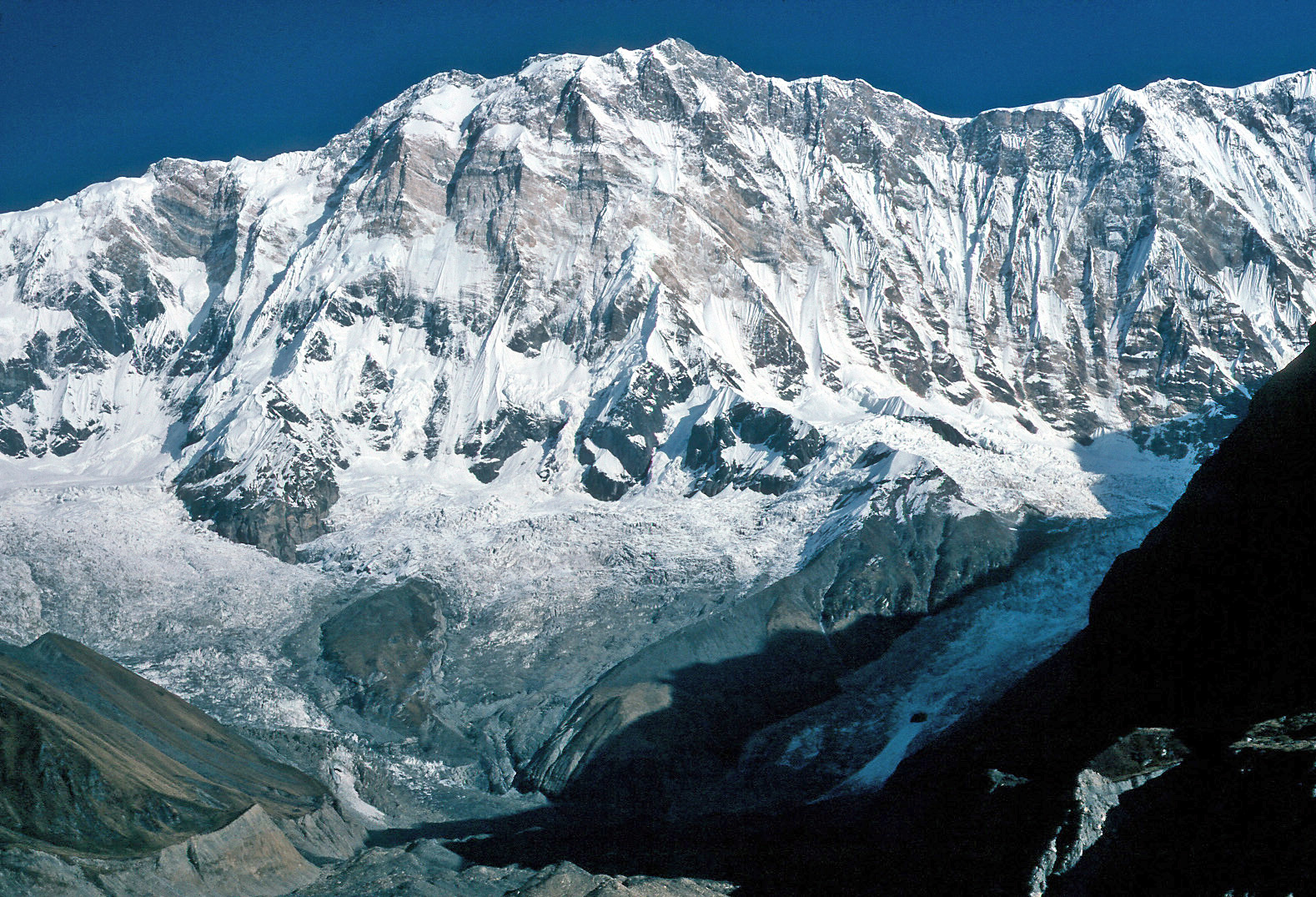
Annapurna, Calafat's final expedition

=== Final expedition ===
In 2010, joined an expedition to Annapurna led by Basque mountaineer Juanito Oiarzabal. After reaching the summit at 4:15pm on April 27, Calafat and his team were trapped 7,600m on the mountain by a blizzard when he became ill with cerebral edema. Two members of his team managed to descend far enough to reach their high camp, but Calafat was unable to continue. Calafat reached his team via radio, reportedly pleading, "For my children's sake, come and get me down from here".

Calafat would remain exposed at altitude for the next two days, unable to move, as his team was unsuccessful at convincing sherpas to rescue him. Sherpas had diverted to support Oh Eun-sun who was undertaking her final eight-thousander and were unwilling to assist Calafat off the mountain. After reaching out to ground support for a helicopter assist, a high altitude rescue attempt was made, but delayed by the weather. By the time a helicopter with doctor and mountaineer Jorge Egocheaga reached Calafat's position, it was too late, and he had been covered by snow and died.

Due to the altitude, Calafat's body remained on Annapurna, at an elevation of 7,400m. The remainder of Calafat's team was evacuated from the mountain by a Swiss rescue team helicopter that had originally come to Calafat's aid.

=== Aftermath ===
Calafat's death was widely reported in Spain and across Europe, due to the high profile of the expedition team, the similar circumstances of climber Ochoa de Olza's death two years previously, and from increasing speculation over Oh Eun-sun's summit claim considering the weather on the mountain. Controversy was further raised when one of the expedition team members, Carlos Pauner indicated that Calafat himself was to blame for his death, due to not having enough strength to continue.

Oiarzabal's expedition to Annapurna was documented by filmmaker Arancha Vega. In 2010, the film, "Annapurna" was released, which features Calafat's final climb.

== See also ==
- Iñaki Ochoa de Olza, Spanish climber who died in similar circumstances to Calafat on Annapurna two years prior
