= Horia Colibășanu =

Romanian mountaineer (born 1977)

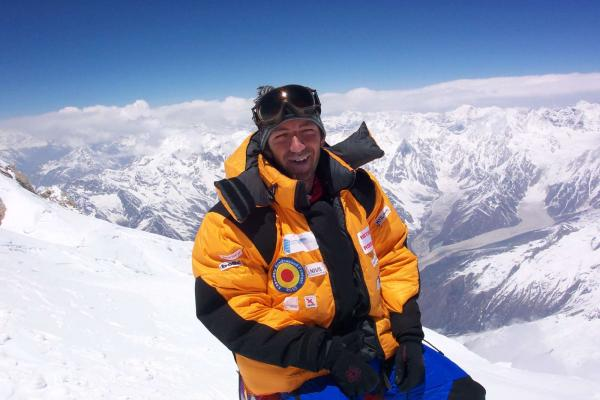
- Born: Horia Colibășanu; January 4, 1977 (age 49); Timișoara, Romania
- Awards: Spirit of Mountaineering Award (2009)

Horia Colibășanu (born 4 January 1977) is a Romanian climber. He is the first Romanian to have climbed K2, Manaslu, Dhaulagiri, Annapurna, and Kangchenjunga. He climbed 11 of the 14 highest peaks in the world, above 8,000 m. In 2009 Horia received the “Spirit of Mountaineering” award for his role in the rescue operation of Iñaki Ochoa de Olza.

== 8,000 m+ mountains summited ==
- 2004: K2 (8,611 m) – first Romanian ascent, without bottled oxygen
- 2006: Manaslu (8,163 m) – first Romanian ascent, without bottled oxygen
- 2007: Dhaulagiri (8,167 m) – first Romanian ascent, without bottled oxygen
- 2009: Shishapangma Central Summit (8,013 m) - without bottled oxygen
- 2010: Annapurna (8,091 m) - first Romanian ascent, without bottled oxygen
- 2011: Makalu (8,481 m) - without bottled oxygen
- 2013: Lhotse (8,516 m) - first Romanian ascent, without bottled oxygen
- 2014: Shishapangma Main Summit (8,027 m) - without bottled oxygen
- 2017: Everest (8,848 m) - first Romanian ascent without bottled oxygen
- 2022: Kangchenjunga (8,586 m) - first Romanian ascent, without bottled oxygen
- 2023: Broad Peak (8,051 m) - without bottled oxygen
- 2025: Nanga Parbat (8,125 m) - without bottled oxygen

== Other notable ascents ==
- 1998: Gumachi (3,805 m), Elbrus (5,642 m)
- 1999: Khan Tengri (7,010 m)
- 2002: Elbrus (5,642 m)
- 2003: Matterhorn (4,462 m) – via Lion ridge – Italy
