= Edurne Pasaban =

Spanish Basque mountaineer (born 1973)

Edurne Pasaban Lizarribar
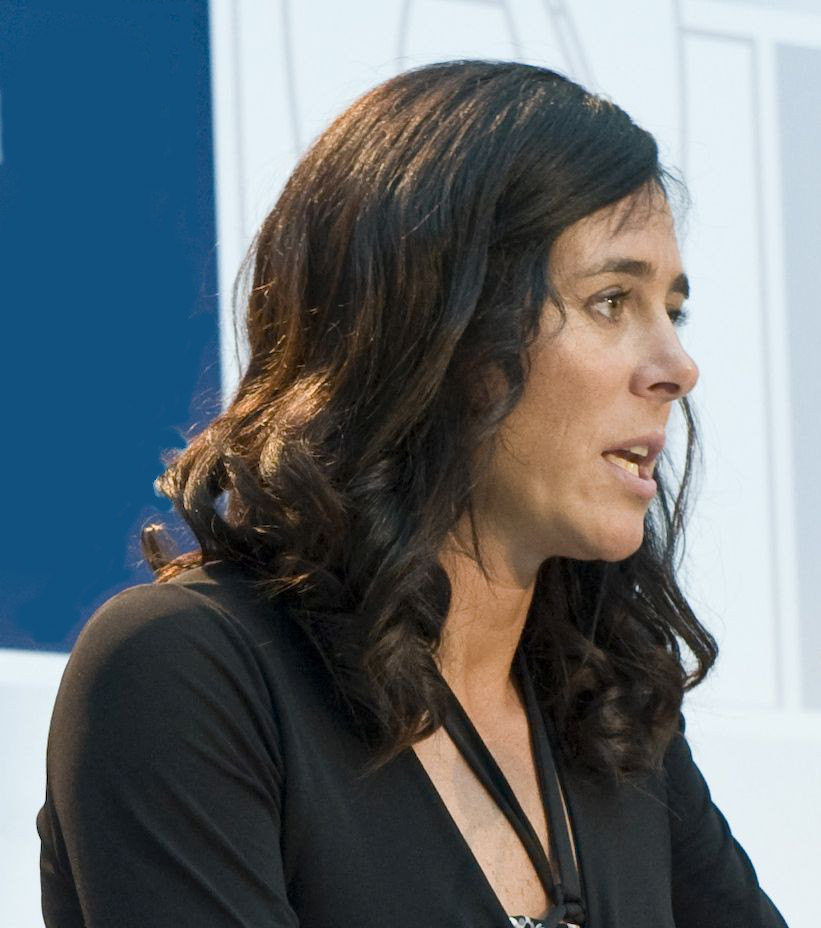
- Born: 1 August 1973 (age 53); Tolosa, Gipuzkoa, Spain
- Occupation: Mountaineering
- Website: http://www.edurnepasaban.com

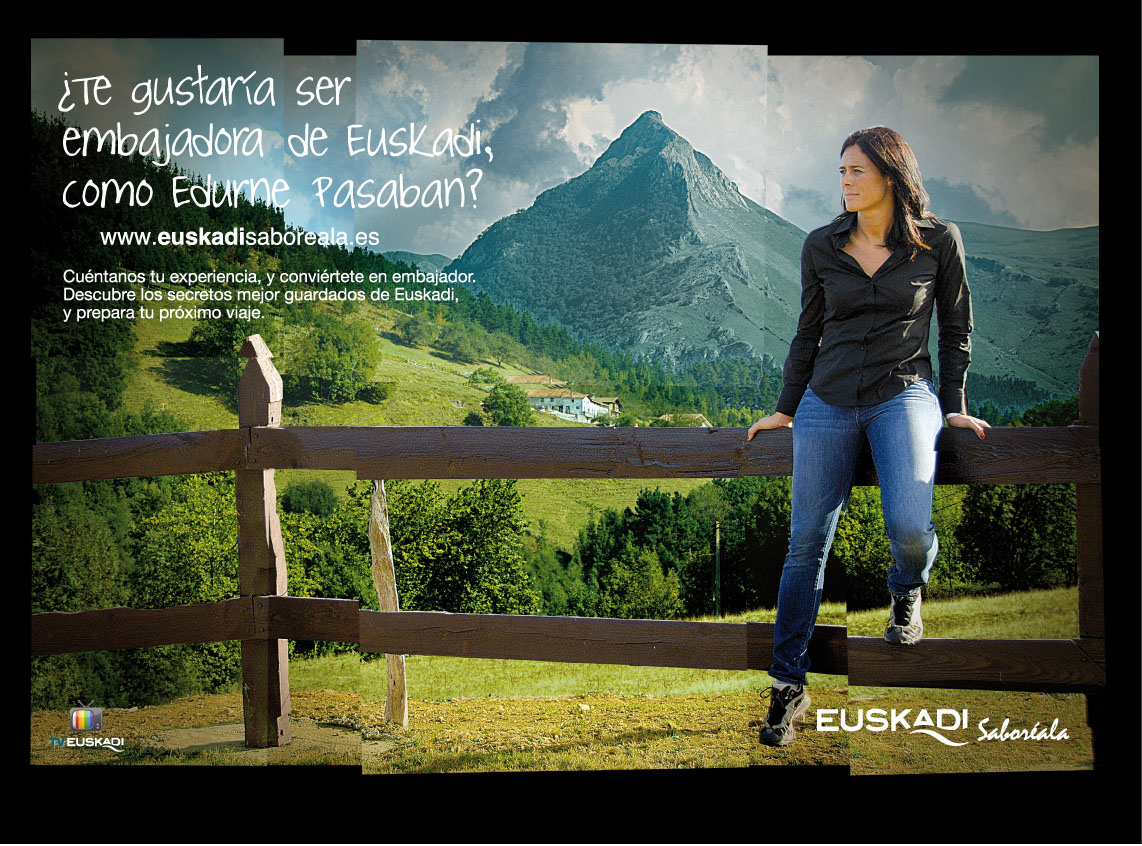
Poster with Edurne Pasaban

Edurne Pasaban Lizarribar (born August 1, 1973) is a Basque Spanish mountaineer. On May 17, 2010, she became the first woman to climb all 14 of the eight-thousanders – and the 21st person to do so. Her first 8,000 peak had been achieved 9 years earlier, on May 23, 2001, when she reached the summit of Mount Everest. She has also completed the seven summits.

== Life and career ==
Pasaban was born on August 1, 1973 in Tolosa in the province of Gipuzkoa in the Basque Autonomous Community, Spain.

=== Climbing ===
She summited her ninth eight-thousander, Broad Peak, on July 12, 2007, together with the Austrian climber Gerlinde Kaltenbrunner. On May 1, 2008, Pasaban summited Dhaulagiri, as did Kaltenbrunner the same day again. Both downplayed the aspect of a race between them for the first woman to climb all 14 eight-thousanders. On May 18, 2009, Pasaban climbed Kangchenjunga with, among others, Juanito Oiarzabal and the Polish climber Kinga Baranowska. With that she exceeded Kaltenbrunner and Nives Meroi and she became the first woman to climb twelve eight-thousanders. Gerlinde Kaltenbrunner equaled her two days later when summited Lhotse. Nives Meroi, an Italian climber, then tried to reach the summit of Kangchenjunga, but was forced to abandon the climb when her husband and fellow climber, Romano Benet, began suffering health problems during the ascent.

On April 17, 2010, she added Annapurna to her record, and proceeded directly thereafter to climb Shishapangma, where she completed her quest on May 17.

=== Temporary Dispute Over 14 Peaks Record ===
On April 27, 2010, it was announced that Pasaban might have lost out on becoming the first woman to climb all 14 8,000 meter peaks to Korean climber Oh Eun-sun. However, Pasaban and other experts disputed Oh's summit of Kangchenjunga. Following a conversation between Elizabeth Hawley and Pasaban, Hawley announced that Oh's summit would be marked as "disputed" in future editions of her Himalayan database. On May 3, Oh had an hour long discussion with Hawley in Kathmandu, in which she asked Oh about the details of her Kangchenjunga climb. "Oh will be credited for her climb to Kangchenjunga but the ascent will be marked as disputed," Hawley later told the press. "Her account was completely different from Pasaban's so I really don't know who is right," she added. Hawley reportedly said the Kangchenjunga entry will be switched back to "successful" if the Spanish team withdraws its allegations. Rejecting Pasaban's claims, Oh added, "I believe that according to Pasaban, some Sherpas told her that I hadn't climbed Kangchenjunga. But no names of the Sherpas have been mentioned. Why?"

On May 4, 2010 Pasaban mentioned the names of the seven Sherpas involved: "Dawa Ongchu Sherpa, Pema Chiring Sherpa, Chheji Nurbu Sherpa, Dawa Sangge Sherpa, Ong Darchi Sherpa, Cuombi Sherpa and Phurdorchi Sherpa." She declined to give these names earlier as these Sherpas were still working for the Korean climber. Later Pasaban conceded that she was the second woman to climb the 14 highest peaks, but questioned whether Oh Eun-sun had actually conquered them all.

However, on August 29, 2010, it was announced that the South Korean Hiking Federation, after examining the proofs presented by Oh, had refused to acknowledge her Kangchenjunga ascent, accepting the sherpas' version according to which Oh was not able to complete the ascent due to bad weather conditions. Oh later admitted that she had to stop a few hundred meters below the Kangchenjunga summit, and the mountaineering site ExplorersWeb considered on December 10, 2010 that Edurne Pasaban is the first woman that has climbed all fourteen peaks, settling the debate.

== Eight-thousanders climbed ==
- 2010, May 17 – Shishapangma
- 2010, April 17 – Annapurna
- 2009, May 18 – Kangchenjunga
- 2008, October 5 – Manaslu
- 2008, May 1 – Dhaulagiri
- 2007, July 12 – Broad Peak
- 2005, July 20 – Nanga Parbat
- 2004, July 26 – K2
- 2003, July 26 – Gasherbrum I
- 2003, July 19 – Gasherbrum II
- 2003, May 26 – Lhotse
- 2002, October 5 – Cho Oyu
- 2002, May 16 – Makalu
- 2001, May 23 – Mount Everest

Awards
Preceded by Marta Domínguez	Spanish Sportswoman of the Year; 2010	Succeeded by Marina Alabau
