= Carlos Soria Fontán =

Spanish mountain climber (born 1939)

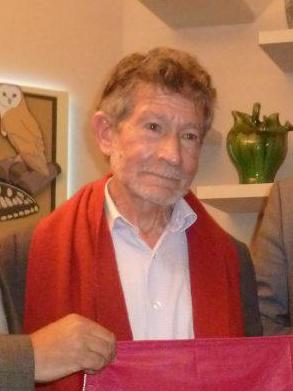
- Fontán in 2018
- Born: 5 February 1939 (age 87); Ávila, Spain
- Occupation: Mountaineering
- Website: www.carlossoriaalpinista.com

Carlos Soria Fontán (Ávila, Spain, February 5, 1939) is a Spanish mountaineer who has taken up the challenge of becoming the oldest person in the world to reach the summits of the 14 eight-thousanders. He is the only climber to have ascended ten mountains above 8,000 meters after turning 60, and is the oldest person in history to have successfully climbed K2 (65 years old), Broad Peak (68), Makalu (69), Gasherbrum I (70), Kanchenjunga (75 years old), Annapurna (77 years old) and Manaslu (86 years old).

== Beginnings ==
Carlos Soria became interested in mountaineering at the early age of 14, he set out to ascend the Sierra de Guadarrama (province of Madrid, Spain), accompanied by a friend, Antonio Riaño. That was the first of many climbs until at the age of 21, when he moved up to a different category altogether. Accompanied by another friend, in 1960 he rode a Vespa all the way to the Alps for his first high-difficulty climbings.

In 1968, he was on the first Spanish expedition to the Soviet Union to climb Mount Elbrus, the highest mountain in Europe (5,642 meters), and in 1971 he went on an expedition to Alaska's Denali, at 6,194 meters the highest mountain peak in North America.

Ever since, Soria has been inextricably linked to the history of Spanish mountain climbing. In 1973 and 1975 he took part in the first Spanish expeditions to the Himalayas, witnessing Spain's first successful ascent of an eight-thousander, by Jerónimo López and Gerardo Blázquez. It was not until 1990, however, that he achieved his first 'eight-thousander' (Nanga Parbat), 17 years after his first attempt. In 2010 he first climbed Manaslu, 37 years after his first attempt, which attests to his tenacity and determination to succeed.

Carlos Soria has undertaken most of his expeditions practically solo, assisted only by some sherpas and porters, in particular, Muktu Sherpa, who has accompanied him on six expeditions and four 8,000-meter ascents (K-2, Shishapagma, Manaslu and Lhotse). However, since July 2011, Soria has been supported by the Spanish bank BBVA, allowing him to face the last of his planned 14 'eight-thousanders' with greater guarantees and resources. Carlos Soria has become a leading sports figure because of his achievement of extraordinary feats at an age when most persons of his generation are spectators. His 2004 ascent of the K2 (8,611 meters) at the age of 65 and his 2008 solo ascent without oxygen of the Makalu (8,463 meters), have revolutionized mountaineering.

== All his eight-thousanders ==
=== In chronological order ===
1. Nanga Parbat (8.125 m.), Pakistan, 1990
2. Gasherbrum II (8.035 m.), China/Pakistan, 1994
3. Cho Oyu (8.201 m.), China/Nepal, 1999
4. Everest (8.848 m.), China/Nepal, 2001
5. K2 (8.611 m.), China/Pakistan, 2004
6. Broad Peak (8.047 m.), China/Pakistan, 2007
7. Makalu (8.465 m.), China/Nepal, 2008
8. Gasherbrum I (8.068 m.), China/Pakistan, 2009
9. Manaslu (8.163 m.), Nepal, 2010
10. Lhotse (8.516 m.), China/Nepal, 2011
11. Kanchenjunga (8.586 m.), Nepal, 2014
12. Annapurna (8.091 m.), Nepal, 2016
13. Manaslu (8.163 m.), Nepal, 2025

== A life in sports ==
- 12 summits above 8,000 meters
- Oldest person in history to have climbed an eight-thousander: 86 years old (2025).
- Oldest person in history to have climbed K2 (8,611 meters), Broad Peak (8,047 meters), Makalu (8,463 meters), Manaslu (8,163 meters), Lhotse (8,516 meters), Kanchenjunga (8,586 meters) and Anapurna (8,091 meters).
- Only mountaineer in the world to have climbed ten mountains of more than 8,000 meters after turning 60
- First person in the world to reach the peak of the Dome Khang (7,260 meters)
- Ascent of the 7 highest summits of 7 continents—a challenge that he completed when he was more than 70 years old: Elbrus (Europe-1968), McKinley (North America-1971), Aconcagua (South America-1986), Everest (Asia-2001), Mount Vinson (Antarctica- 2007), Carstensz (Oceania-2010) and Kilimanjaro (Africa-2010).

== Awards ==
- Silver Medal for Sporting Achievement, Spain's High Council of Sports, 2011
- National Award, Spanish Geographic Society
- Gold Medal, Peñalara Royal Society in 1991, 1994, 2000, 2002 and 2004.
- Silver Medal for Sporting Achievement, Madrid Regional Government
- Gold Medal, Spanish Mountaineering Federation, 1968, 1971 and 1975
- Sportsperson of the Year, Spanish Mountaineering Federation, 1976
- Sportsperson of the Year, Spanish Ski Federation, 1979
- Admittance into the Royal Order of Sports Achievement with a bronze medal presented by H.M., Juan Carlos I, King of Spain, in 2001

== Interviews and features ==
- "Informe Robinson", Canal Plus, February 2011. Part 1 on YouTube
- "Informe Robinson", Canal Plus, February 2011, Part 2 on YouTube
- “Al filo de lo imposible”, RTVE, December 2011
- El Pais newspaper, November 2011
- Cadena SER Radio, November 2011
- Vocento Group, October 2011
- Deia newspaper, November 2011
- Revista Desnivel, julio de 2008 on YouTube

== Documentaries ==
- "7-70", by Dani Salas on YouTube
- “The end of loneliness”, by Igapín Cinema and Dokumalia on YouTube
- “Carlos Soria and the K2”, by Avista Multimedia and AXN on YouTube
