= Iñaki Ochoa de Olza =

Spanish mountaineer (1967–2008)

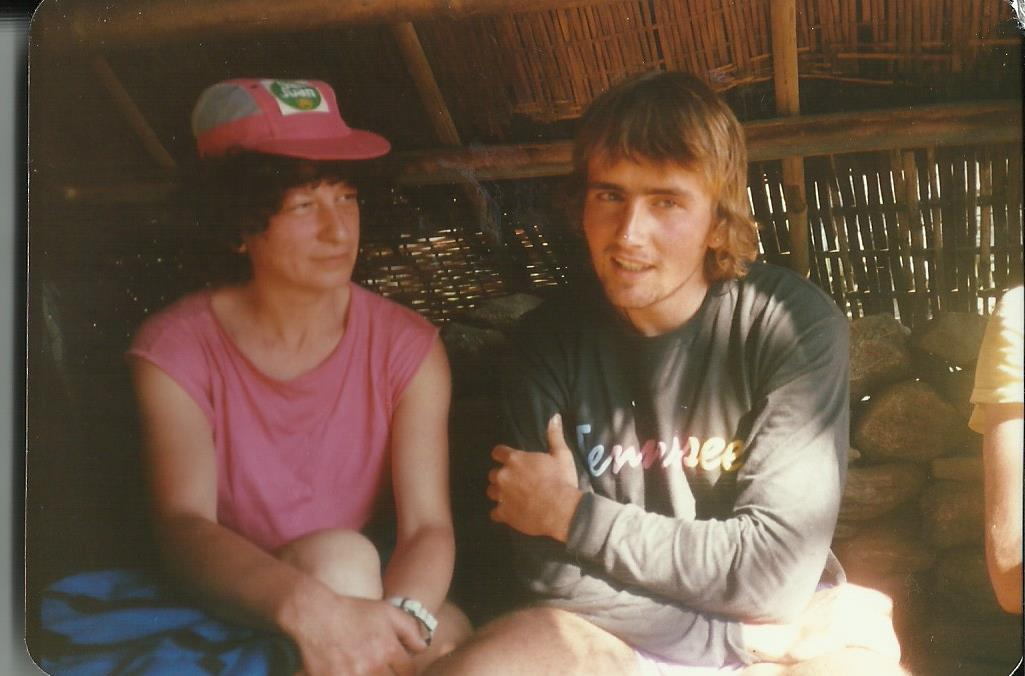
- Amalia Kaploniak (left) and Iñaki Ochoa de Olza (right) in 1991
- Born: May 29, 1967; Pamplona, Navarre, Spain
- Died: May 23, 2008 (aged 40); Annapurna, Nepal

Iñaki Ochoa de Olza (May 29, 1967 in Pamplona, Navarre – May 23, 2008 on Annapurna, Nepal) was a Spanish climber. Ochoa de Olza took part in more than thirty separate climbing expeditions in the Himalayas over the course of his career, and was involved in more than 200 expeditions as a guide. He climbed 12 of the world's 14 tallest mountains (repeating one of them, Cho Oyu) without using oxygen. Ochoa went on record as saying that he did not believe in using oxygen to climb mountains, claiming "if you use oxygen, you are not an alpinist; you are more of an astronaut or a scuba diver.". He died of pulmonary edema in May 2008 while climbing Annapurna (which would have been his 13th eight thousander).

== Mountaineering ==
Iñaki Ochoa de Olza was born in Pamplona, Navarra, north of Spain, on May 29, 1967. He completed his first climb over 8,000 meters when he reached the peak of Kangchenjunga at the age of 22. He also worked as a high altitude guide and cameraman. In 2005, he completed a solo climb on a new route on Shishapangma.

In recognition of his sporting career he was awarded with the Gold Medal of Sports Merit of the Government of Navarre, his homeland. All the alpinists who contributed and took part in his rescue received the award as well.

== Death ==
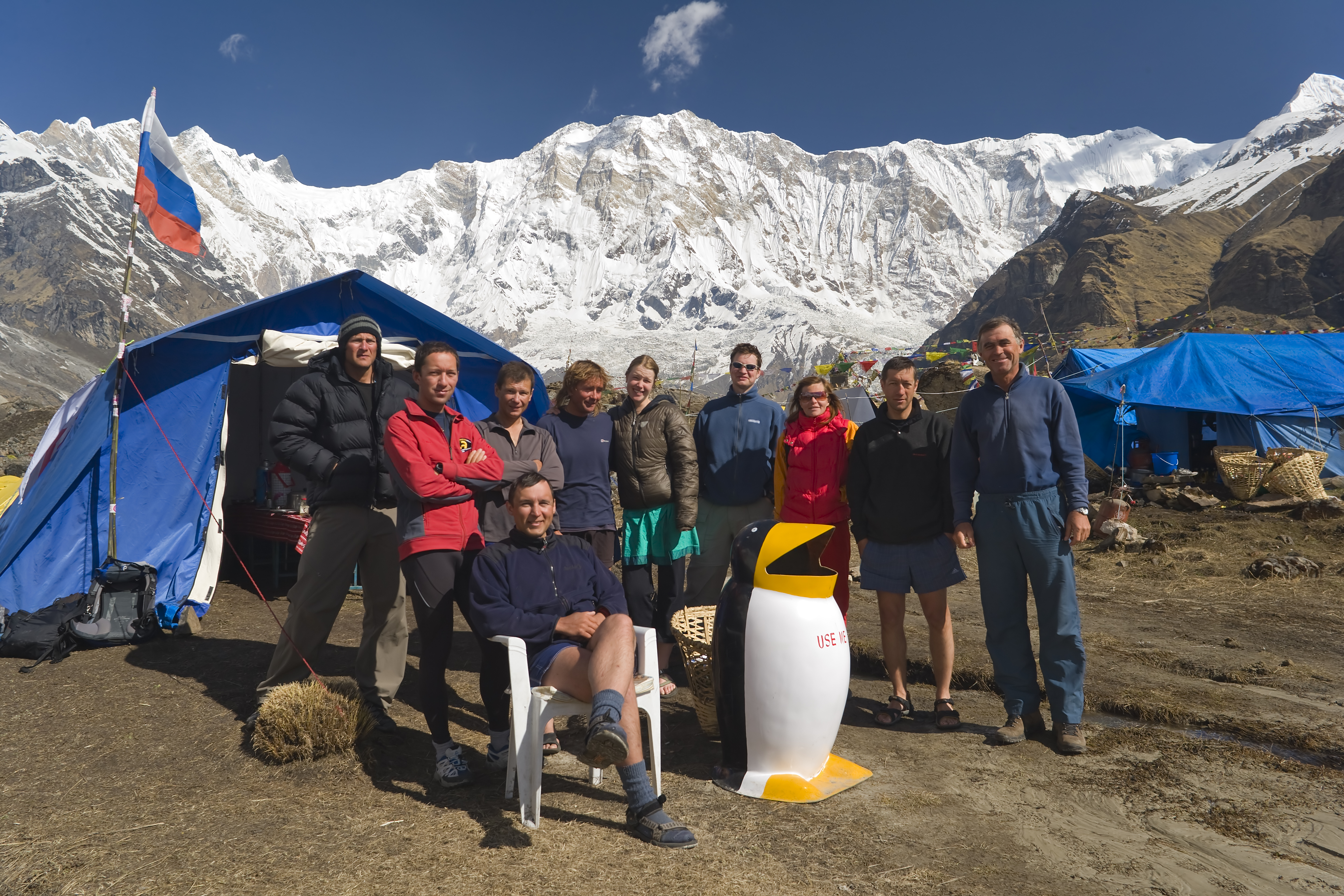
Last photo Iñaki Ochoa de Olza. Annapurna Base Camp, April 30, 2008

Ochoa died in 2008 while attempting to climb the 8,091-metre (26,545 ft) Nepalese mountain, Annapurna. He was with his climbing partner, Romanian alpinist Horia Colibășanu, when they were forced to halt their climb near the summit of the mountain because of dangerous weather conditions. Ochoa had suffered severe frostbite to his hands. Upon their descent back down the mountain, Ochoa collapsed and suffered a seizure near Annapurna's Camp 4. He and his partner were unable to descend any further due to Ochoa's sudden illness and incapacitation. Ochoa suffered from lung and brain damage due to the seizure. His condition was further complicated by pulmonary edema. Attempts were made to save Ochoa's life. Swiss climber Ueli Steck, who had abandoned his own attempt with Simon Anthamatten to climb Annapurna's south face due to avalanche threat the previous week, climbed to Ochoa's position to administer emergency medical aid. Doctors from the Hospital of Navarre also tried to help Ochoa remotely from Pamplona. However, heavy snow conditions and the high altitude made all rescue attempts impossible. (Rescues above 7400 metres are usually impossible because helicopters cannot hover at that altitude and few people are able to handle the altitude.) Steck and Colibasanu were left to administer first aid to Ochoa.

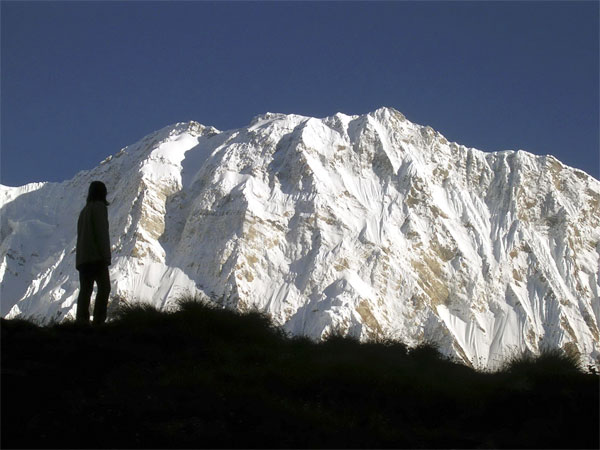
Annapurna

Ochoa died on May 23, 2008, at 6:45 a.m. GMT in an emergency tent on Annapurna, where he had been trapped in a semiconscious and immobile state for five days. He died from a suspected pulmonary edema, as well as a brain lesion, according to the Spanish newspaper, Diario de Navarra. His body was left on the mountain, at the request of his family.

== Notable ascents ==
1. Cho Oyu (8,201 m): in 1993.
2. Gasherbrum I (8,068 m): in 1996.
3. Gasherbrum II (8,035 m): in 1996.
4. Lhotse (8,516 m): in 1999.
5. Mount Everest (8,848 m): in 2001.
6. Nanga Parbat (8,125 m): in 2003.
7. Broad Peak (8,046 m): in 2003.
8. Makalu (8,463 m): in 2004.
9. K2 (8,611 m): in 2004.
10. Manaslu (8,163 m): in 2006.
11. Shisha Pangma (8,027 m): in 2006.
12. Dhaulagiri (8,167 m): in 2007.

== See also ==
- Tolo Calafat, Spanish mountaineer who died on Annapurna in similar circumstances two years later
