= Juanito Oiarzabal =

Basque mountain climber, summiteer of all eight-thousanders

Juan Eusebio Oiarzabal
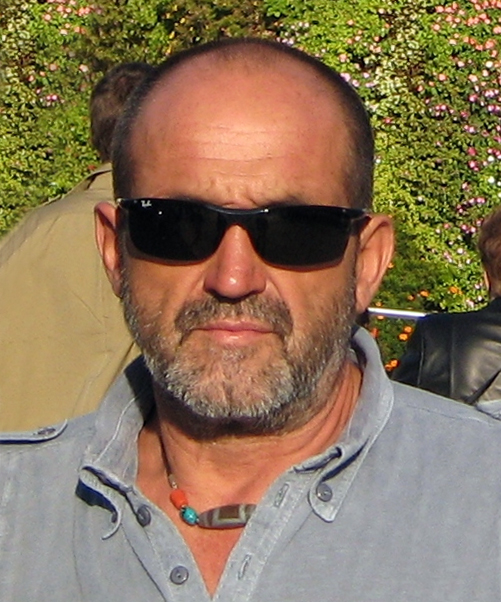
- Juanito Oiarzabal in 2007
- Born: March 30, 1956 (age 70); Vitoria-Gasteiz, Basque Country, Spain
- Occupations: Mountaineer; author
- Website: www.juanitooiarzabal.com

Juan Eusebio Oiarzabal Urteaga (born 30 March 1956), commonly known as Juanito Oiarzabal, is a noted Spanish Basque mountaineer. He has written four books on the subject. He was the 6th man to reach all 14 eight-thousander summits, and the third to do so without supplemental oxygen. He was the first person to climb the top three summits twice (Everest + K2 + Kangchenjunga) and the oldest climber to summit Kangchenjunga, at almost 53, until Carlos Fontan did so in 2014, at 75 years old. In 2004, he lost all his toes to frostbite after summiting K2.

In 2009, he announced wanting to become the first person in history to reach a "double 14", summiting each 8000er twice. In April 2010 he reached 24 eight-thousanders, after climbing Annapurna, a world record. In 2011 he climbed Lhotse for a second time, which was his 25th eight-thousander. He is second all-time for 8000er ascents behind Nepali climber Phurba Tashi Sherpa, who has 30.

== The Himalayas ==
His success in the Himalayas is documented, but before starting on those ascents he had already accumulated an extensive resume in Spain. He undertook ascents on all the Spanish mountain masses, including technically demanding paths, and also several first ascents. He has extensive experience in climbing the Alps, undertaking climbs for the technical challenges they presented. In addition to his climbs in the Alps, he has climbed in North America, South America, and Africa. To date, he has participated in 35 Himalayan expeditions over a period of 23 years.

== Mountaineering curriculum ==
=== Alaska ===
- 1984 – Denali ( known also as McKinley) (6,194 m or 20,322 ft) – West Buttress Route.

=== Argentina ===
- 1983 – Aconcagua (6,957 m or 22,825 ft) – 5th world winter ascent (he has accredited 16 ascents to the Aconcagua, as a "guide").

=== Kenya ===
- 1988 – Mount Kenya – Diamond Corridor.

=== Nepal ===
- 1982 – Kangchuntse (Makalu II) (7,640 m or 25,070 ft). Altitude reached: 7,200 m (23,600 ft).
- 1988 – Kangchenjunga (8,586 m or 28,169 ft). North side. Altitude reached: 8,000 m (26,000 ft).
- 1989 – Makalu (8,465 m or 27,772 ft). West Pillar. Altitude reached: 8,350 m (27,400 ft).
- 1990 – Everest (8,848 m or 29,029 ft). Southwest side. Altitude reached: 8,300 m (27,200 ft).
- 1991 – Kangchenjunga (8,586 m or 28,169 ft). North side. Altitude reached: 8,400 m (27,600 ft).
- 1993 – Everest (8,848 m or 29,029 ft). South-Southeast Route - crest. Summit.
- 1995 – Makalu (8,465 m or 27,772 ft). Normal route. Summit.
- 1995 – Lhotse (8,516 m or 27,940 ft). Normal Route. Summit.
- 1996 – Kangchenjunga (8,586 m or 28,169 ft). North side. British route. Summit.
- 1997 – Manaslu (8,163 m or 26,781 ft). Normal route. Summit.
- 1998 – Dhaulagiri (8,167 m or 26,795 ft). Normal route. Summit.
- 1999 – Annapurna (8,091 m or 26,545 ft). German route. Summit.
- 2002 – Makalu (8,465 m or 27,772 ft). West pillar. Altitude reached: 7,600 m (24,900 ft).
- 2004 – Ama Dablam (6,856 m or 22,493 ft). Southwestern sharp edge. Summit.
- 2008 – Makalu (8,465 m or 27,772 ft). Normal route. Summit.
- 2009 – Kangchenjunga (8,586 m or 28,169 ft). Normal route. Summit.
- 2010 – Annapurna (8,091 m or 26,545 ft). Summit (helicopter used on descent, expedition death of Tolo Calafat).
- 2011 – Lhotse (8,516 m or 27,940 ft). Summit.
- 2011 – Manaslu (8,163 m or 26,781 ft). Normal route. Summit.

=== Pakistan ===
- 1987 – Gasherbrum II (8,035 m or 26,362 ft). Summit.
- 1987 – Hidden Peak (8,068 m or 26,470 ft). Messner route. Altitude reached: 6,800 m (22,300 ft).
- 1992 – Nanga Parbat (8,125 m or 26,657 ft). Kinshofer route. Summit.
- 1994 – K2 - Chogori (8,611 m or 28,251 ft). Tomo Cesen route (1st integral). Summit.
- 1995 – Broad Peak (8,047 m or 26,401 ft). Normal route. Summit.
- 1997 – Hidden Peak (8,068 m or 26,470 ft). Japanese Corridor. Summit.
- 2003 – Broad Peak (8,047 m or 26,401 ft). Winter. Altitude reached: 6,900 m (22,600 ft).
- 2003 – Gasherbrum II (8,035 m or 26,362 ft). Normal route. Summit.
- 2003 – Hidden Peak (8,068 m or 26,470 ft). Japanese Corridor. Summit.
- 2004 – K2 - Chogori (8,611 m or 28,251 ft). Summit.

=== China ===
- 1985 – Cho-Oyu (8,201 m or 26,906 ft). Normal route. Summit.
- 1998 – Shisha Pangma (8,046 m or 26,398 ft). Southwest side. British route. Summit.
- 2000 – Everest (8,848 m or 29,029 ft). North side. Altitude reached: 8,700 m (28,500 ft) (without O_{2}).
- 2001 – Everest (8,848 m or 29,029 ft). North side. Summit (without O_{2}).
- 2002 – Cho-Oyu (8,201 m or 26,906 ft). Normal route. Summit.
- 2003 – Cho-Oyu (8,201 m or 26,906 ft). Normal route. Summit (23 September).
- 2003 – Cho-Oyu (8,201 m or 26,906 ft). Normal route. Summit (5 October).

==== China (autonomous region of Xinjiang) ====
- 2000 – Taklamakan 800 km (500 mi) desert crossing, (desert, within the Gobi desert), only with the help of camels.

=== Greenland ===
- 2000 – Crossing between the localities of Narsasoak and Kangarlosoak (650 km or 400 mi) on a sleigh, pulled by a kite.

=== Russia ===
- 2001 – Mount Elbrus (5,642 m or 18,510 ft) Normal route. Winter. The highest European summit.

== Awards and distinctions ==
- In his role as an expert, he has participated in several mountain rescue activities, receiving recognition for them.
- He is a Member of Honour of different mountaineering clubs.
- He is a Member of the Basque Mountaineering Club.
- He is a climbing professor.
- He is a professor of the Basque Mountaineering School (EVAM)
- Mountaineering Guide, Member of the International Union of Mountaineering Guide Associations (UIAGM).
- Golden Insignia from the Basque Mountaineering Federation.
- Member of the "Comité de Patronage du Cinquantenaire de l'Annapurna" in 2000.
- Member of Honor of the Spanish Geography Society.
- Nominated for the "Prince of Asturias" Award for Sports in 1999.
- Finalist for the "Prince of Asturias" Award for Sports in 2001.
- According to the Mundo Deportivo newspaper, he is among the 20 most important Spanish sportsmen of the century.
- Golden Medal for Sports Merit, awarded by the Spanish government in 1999.
- On the proposal of the editors of Basque jeans of communication, the Basque Government awarded him the distinction of Universal Basque Citizen in the year 2000. That year the Jesuit, Ion Sobrino (standard-bearer of the freedom theology in El Salvador), also won the award, which had previously been won by Etxenike, Oteiza and Chillida.
- Member of Honour of the Spanish Exploration and Adventure Cub.
- The sports newspaper Marca awarded him its maximum prize: Marca de Leyenda (Legendary Mark), a distinction that only a handful of elite sportsmen around the world have.
- In recognition of his sports achievements, he has been officially received by outstanding officials and personalities: The Vitoria-Gasteiz City Council, Diputación Foral de Álava, the Lehendakari (Basque President), the former Spanish prime Minister (José María Aznar) and the King of Spain, Juan Carlos de Borbón.
- He was Guest of Honor at the activities organised by the French Government on the occasion of the 50th anniversary of the conquering of Annapurna, invited by its President Jacques Chirac. He was also a member of the activities Committee.
- In 2005 he was awarded the FCG International Award for Sports by the Fundación Cristóbal Gabarrón.

== Books ==
Juanito Oiarzabal has published four books:

- Buscando las catorce estrellas [Searching for the Fourteen Stars] (in Spanish). Editorial Lur. 1997.
- Los 14 ochomiles de Juanito Oiarzabal [The Fourteen Eight-Thousanders of Juanito Oiarzabal] (in Spanish). Ediciones Desnivel. 1999.
- Conversaciones con Juanito Oiarzabal [Conversations with Juanito Oiarzabal] (in Spanish). Ediciones Desnivel. 2001.
- El Everest de Juanito Oiarzabal [Juanito Oiarzabal's Everest] (in Spanish). Ediciones Desnivel. 2002.

== Audiovisual productions ==
- He has undertaken 16 audiovisual productions that have been used to promote mountaineering, offering prestige to this sport at all levels and setting a high standard for both Vitoria-Gasteiz and Alava.
- On TVE, he filmed his ascent of Annapurna for the Al filo de lo imposible (On the Edge of the Impossible) television program.
- He has also recorded many programs, such as the one he did on Everest, recreating the story of Mallory and Irvine who disappeared in 1924 while they tried to reach the summit.
- On the public Basque broadcasting corporation's ETB2 TV channel, he has featured as team leader in several instalments of The conqueror of the world's end, an adventure reality show located in Patagonia (Argentina).
