= Gerlinde Kaltenbrunner =

Austrian mountaineer

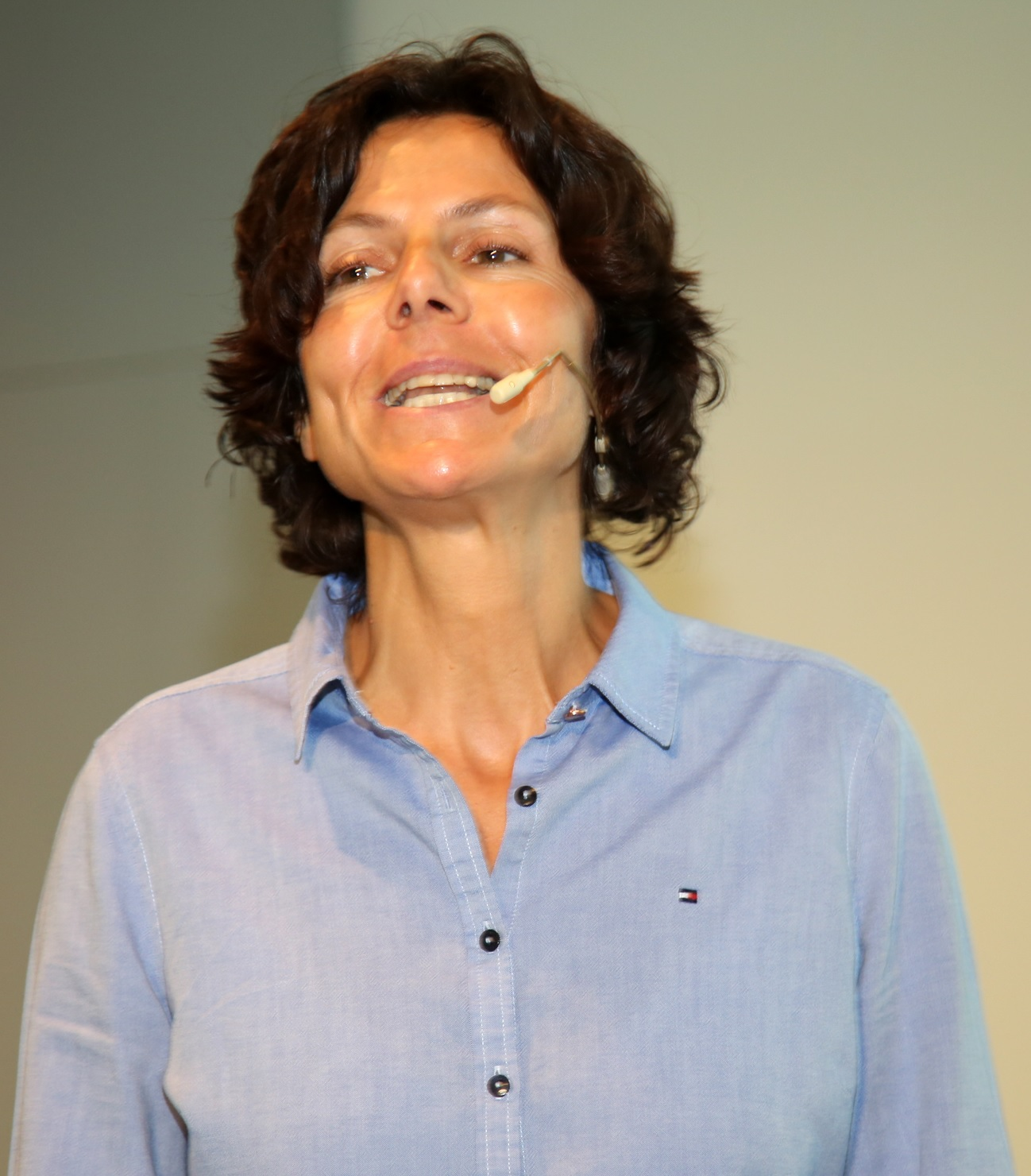
- Gerlinde Kaltenbrunner in July 2015

Personal information
- Nationality: Austrian
- Born: 13 December 1970 (age 55) Kirchdorf an der Krems, Austria
- Occupations: Mountaineer, speaker, trained nurse
- Website: www.gerlinde-kaltenbrunner.at/en/

Climbing career
- Known for: First woman to climb the 14 eight-thousanders in alpine style, without supplemental oxygen or porters

Gerlinde Kaltenbrunner (born 13 December 1970) is an Austrian mountaineer. In August 2011, she became the second woman to climb the fourteen eight-thousanders and the first woman to do so without using supplemental oxygen or high-altitude porters. In 2012, she won the prestigious National Geographic Explorer of the Year Award.

== Mountaineering ==
Her interest in mountain climbing developed at a young age, and by the age of 13, she had completed climbing tours at the local Sturzhahn. As she pursued her nursing training in Vienna, Austria, she continued to hone her skills by participating in numerous ski, ice- and rock-climbing tours. At the age of 32, Kaltenbrunner climbed her fourth 8000m peak, Nanga Parbat, and decided to pursue professional mountain climbing full-time.

=== Eight-thousanders ===
Together with Edurne Pasaban, Kristin Harila and Nives Meroi she is one of only four women who have climbed the fourteen eight-thousanders. Kaltenbrunner climbs without supplemental oxygen, which makes her the first woman to officially reach all fourteen eight-thousanders without the use of supplementary oxygen.

- 1998 – Cho Oyu
- 2001 – Makalu
- 2002 – Manaslu
- 2003 – Nanga Parbat
- 2004 – Annapurna I
- 2004 – Gasherbrum I
- 2005 – Shisha Pangma
- 2005 – Gasherbrum II
- 2006 – Kangchenjunga
- 2007 – Broad Peak
- 2008 – Dhaulagiri
- 2009 – Lhotse
- 2010 – Mount Everest
- 2011 – K2

She summited Broad Peak on 12 July 2007, together with Edurne Pasaban. On 1 May 2008, Kaltenbrunner summited Dhaulagiri, as did Pasaban. At that time both downplayed the aspect of a race between them for the first woman to climb all fourteen eight-thousanders.

On 6 August 2010, Fredrik Ericsson joined Kaltenbrunner on the way to the summit of K2. Ericsson fell 1,000 metres (3,300 ft) and was killed. Kaltenbrunner, who saw Ericsson fall, aborted her summit attempt.

Kaltenbrunner had previously attempted to climb K2 six times and finally succeeded on 23 August 2011, during her seventh expedition to the mountain. National Geographic supported the expedition and provided an account of the epic North Pillar climb.

== Personal life ==
In 2007, she married her mountaineering partner Ralf Dujmovits, from whom she later divorced.

== See also ==
- List of female adventurers
