= Nives Meroi =

Italian mountaineer (born 1961)

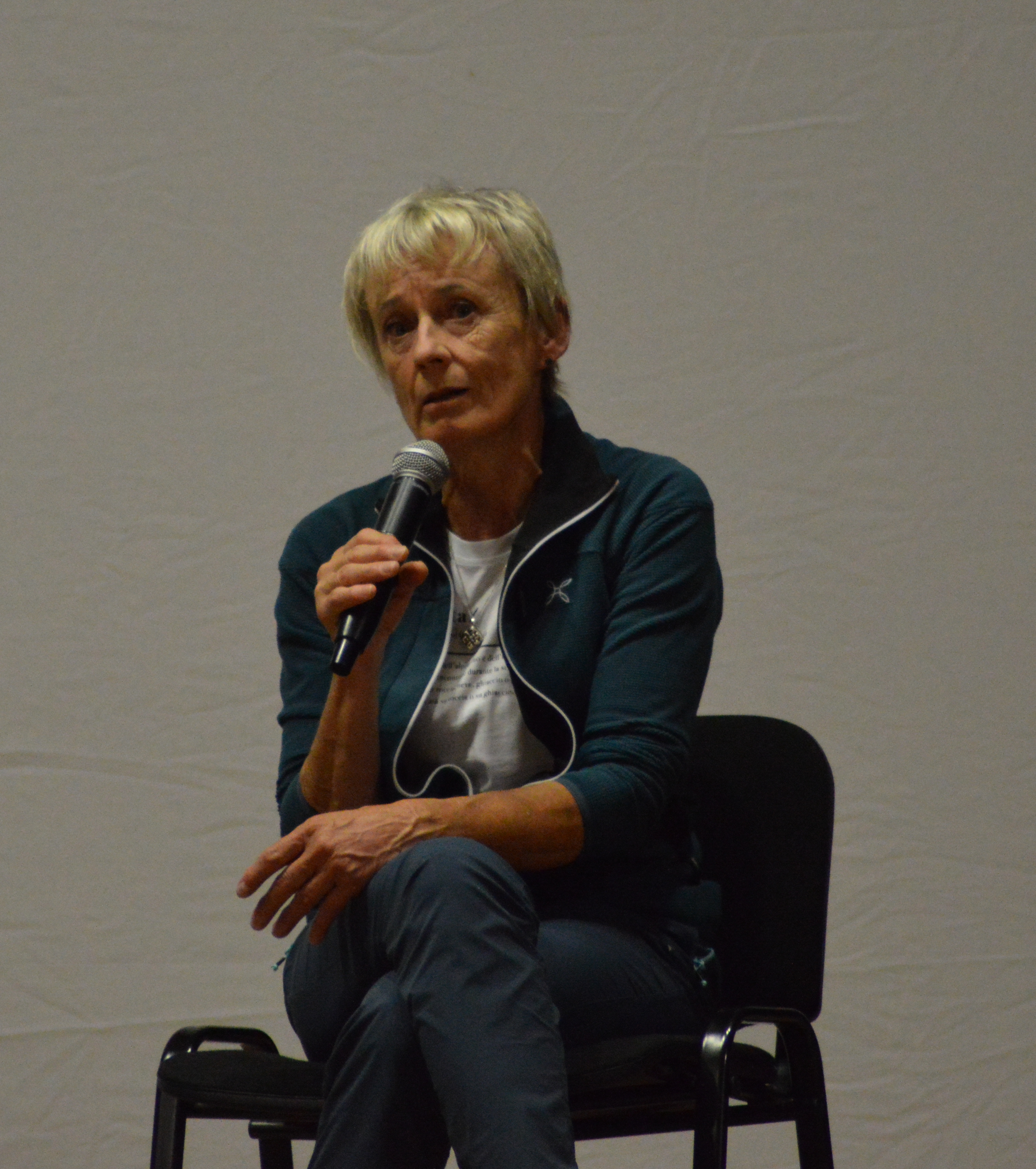
Nives Meroi in 2024

Nives Meroi (born 17 September 1961 in Bonate Sotto) is an Italian mountaineer. On 11 May 2017 she completed the ascent of all 14 eight-thousanders using the alpine style of climbing and without supplemental oxygen.

== Climbing career ==
All of Nives's (and Romano's) climbs to the summits of eight-thousanders were completed without supplementary oxygen and without use of sherpas.

In 2015 Nives published a book about their three expeditions to Kangchenjunga It. "Non ti farò aspettare. Tre volte sul Kangchendzonga, la storia di noi due raccontata da me" ("I won’t let you wait. Three times on Kangchendzonga, the story of the two of us told by me"). Later the book was published in other languages. Nives also wrote a book about their expeditions to Annapurna It. "Il volo del corvo timido" ("The flight of the shy crow")

=== List of eight-thousander climbs ===
- 11 May 2017 summit of Annapurna
- 2016 summit of Makalu
- 2014 summit of Kangchenjunga
- 2009 the second attempt on Annapurna and the first on Kangchenjunga
- 2008 summit of Manaslu
- 2007 summit of Mount Everest, the first summit success of an Italian woman without bottled oxygen
- 2006 summit of K2 (the first Italian woman)
- 2006 summit of Dhaulagiri
- 2004 summit of Lhotse
- 2003 she is the first woman who succeeded in ascending all three eight-thousanders of the Gasherbrum massif (Gasherbrum I, Gasherbrum II and Broad Peak) during one season, within 20 days.
- 1999 summit of Cho Oyu
- 1999 summit of Shishapangma
- 1998 the first summit of the 8000s, Nanga Parbat
- 1996 the first attempt on Mount Everest, missed
- 1994 the first attempt on K2, she gained 8450 m

== Personal life ==
Since 1989, Meroi has been married to Romano Benet, a climber and her partner in Himalayan mountaineering. Meroi and Benet live in Tarvisio in the Alps in northern Italy.
