= Nima Rinji Sherpa =

Nepalese mountaineer

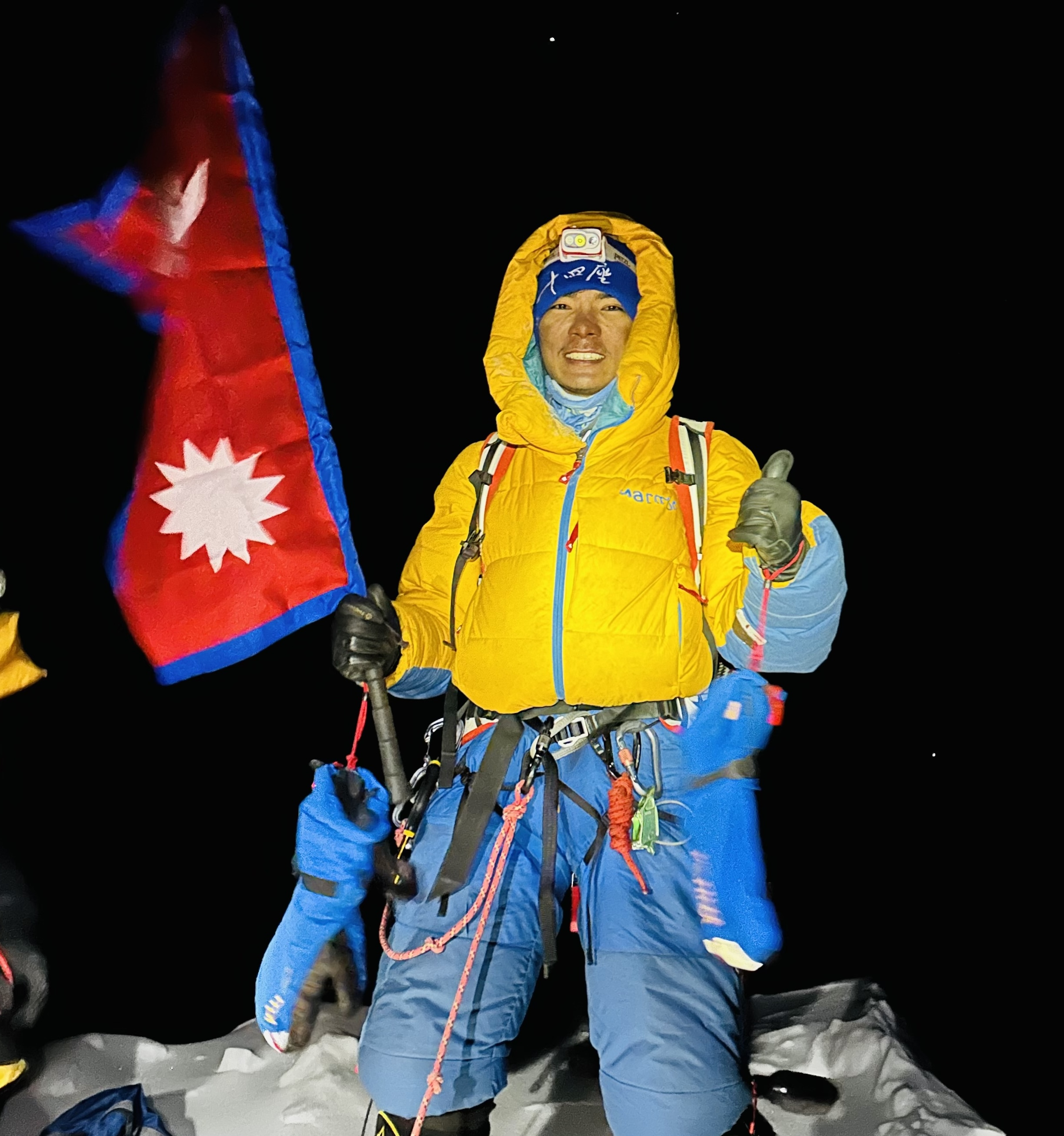
- Nima Rinji Sherpa on the top of Shisha Pangma on 9 October 2024, completing his last 8000 m.

Personal information
- Nationality: Nepalese (Nepal)
- Born: 18 April 2006 (age 20) Sankhuwasabha District, Nepal
- Parent: Tashi Lakpa Sherpa
- Relatives: Mingma and Chhang Dawa

Climbing career
- Major ascents: Youngest person to climb all eight-thousanders

Nima Rinji Sherpa (Nepali: निमा रिन्जी शेर्पा; born 2006) is a Nepalese mountaineer recognized by the Guinness World Records as the youngest person to climb all 14 of the world's 8,000-meter peaks. Achieving this milestone at the age of 18 years, 5 months, and 21 days, Nima completed his record-breaking accomplishment over a period of just 740 days. He reached his final summit on October 9, 2024, at Shishapangma (8,027 m) in China, marking the last of the fourteen highest mountains in the world.

Nima embarked on his high-altitude climbing career at 16, with his first 8,000-meter summit of Manaslu on September 30, 2022. This came shortly after he had completed his 10th-grade exams. Nima's achievement breaks the previous record held by Mingma David Sherpa, who completed all 14 peaks at the age of 30.

== Early life ==
Nima was born into a renowned Sherpa family of mountaineers. His father, Tashi Lakpa Sherpa, became the youngest to summit Mount Everest without supplemental oxygen at 19 and has completed the climb eight times. His uncles, Mingma Sherpa and Chhang Dawa Sherpa, were the first siblings to climb all 14 eight-thousanders and the Seven Summits. Despite the family legacy, Nima recognized the dangers of mountaineering, witnessing around 30 deaths during his expeditions, including the loss of a mentor in an avalanche.

== Climbing career ==
Nima began his mountaineering journey at 16 and gained recognition within the mountaineering community. Over two years, he successfully summited several of the world's tallest peaks, including Everest and K2, completing five climbs in under five weeks. His favorite summit remains Annapurna. He completed his climbs alongside his climbing partner, Pasang Nurbu Sherpa, and was supported by Seven Summit Treks and Fourteen Peaks Expedition.

== 14 Peaks Journey ==
List of 8,000-meter summits by Nima Rinji Sherpa
Rank	Mountain	Height (m)	Summit Date	Remarks
1	Everest	8,848.86	24-May-23	
2	K2	8,611	27-Jul-23	
3	Kangchenjunga	8,586	08-Jun-24	
4	Lhotse	8,516	24-May-23	
5	Makalu I	8,485	04-May-24	
6	Cho Oyu	8,188	06-Oct-23	
7	Dhaulagiri	8,167	29-Sep-23	
8	Manaslu	8,163	30-Sep-22	
9	Nanga Parbat	8,125	26-Jun-23	
10	Annapurna I	8,091	12-Apr-24	No O2
11	Gasherbrum I	8,080	18-Jul-23	
12	Broad Peak	8,051	23-Jul-23	
13	Gasherbrum II	8,034	19-Jul-23	
14	Shishapangma	8,027	09-Oct-24	

== Notable ascents ==
- Youngest Person to climb all 14 Peaks.
- Youngest Person to climb top five 8000ers.
- Youngest person to climb the all 8,000 m peaks in Pakistan

== See also ==
- Chhang Dawa Sherpa
- Tashi Lakpa Sherpa
- Mingma Sherpa
- Mingma Gyabu Sherpa
- Kristin Harila
- Adriana Brownlee
- Tejan Gurung
- Sherpa People
- List of climbers and mountaineers
- Death zone
