= Dawa Sherpa =

Dawa Sherpa may refer to:

- Dawa Dachhiri Sherpa (born 1969) a Nepalese trail runner and a cross-country skier
- Dawa Ongju Sherpa (born 1972), a Nepalese mountaineer who has summited 13 or the 14 highest peaks
- Chhang Dawa Sherpa (born 1982) a Nepalese mountaineer and the youngest mountaineer to summit the 14 highest peaks
- Dawa Yangzum Sherpa (born 1990) a Nepali female mountain climber and first female international mountain guide from Nepal
