= Tenjen Sherpa =

Nepalese mountaineer (1987/1988–2023)

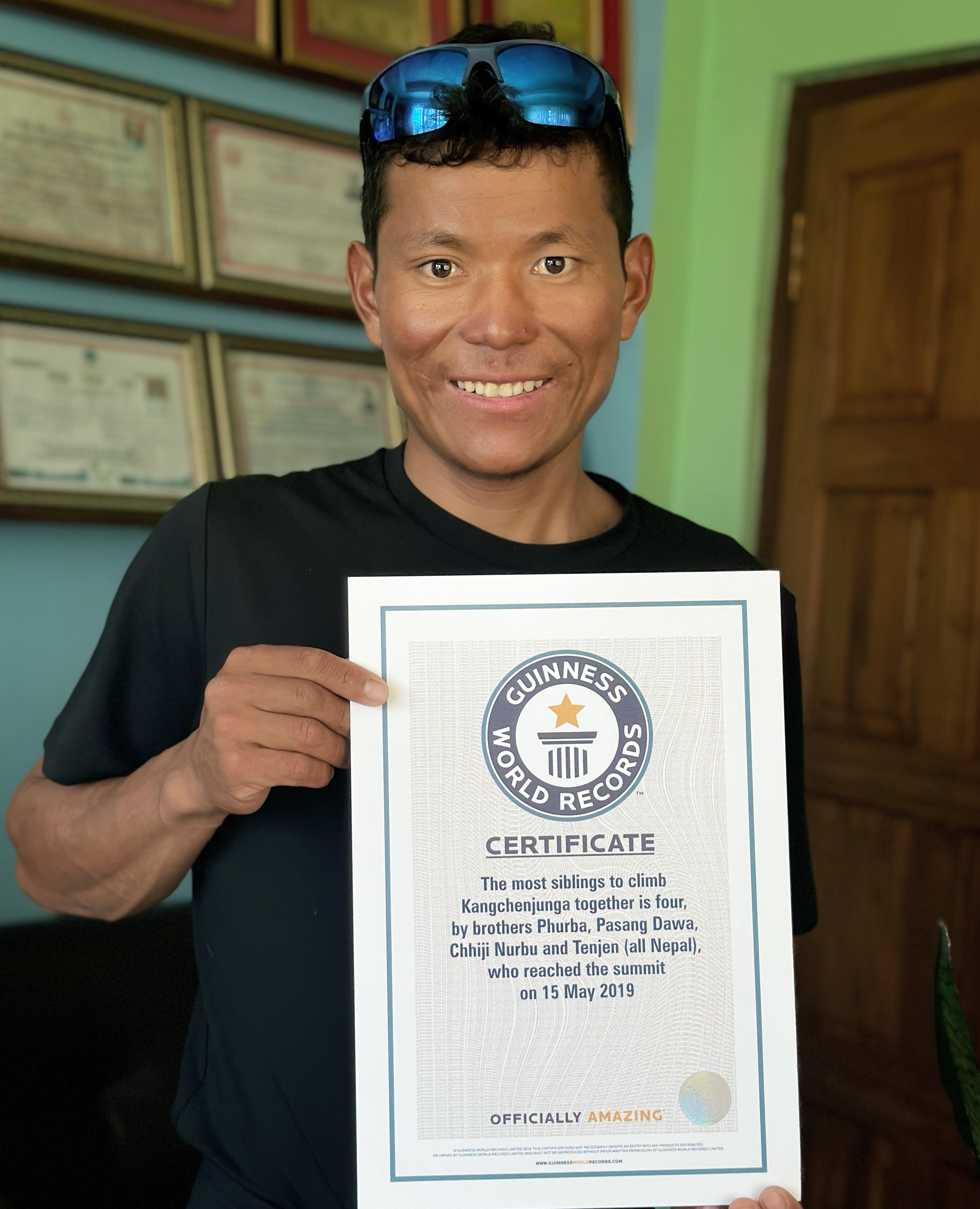

Personal information
- Nationality: Nepalese
- Born: 1987/1988 Makalu, Sankhuwasbha, Nepal
- Died: 7 October 2023 Shishapangma, Tibet

Climbing career
- Major ascents: Fastest to climb all 14 eight-thousanders within 92 days.
- Known for: Mountaineering

Tenjen Sherpa (1987/1988 – 7 October 2023), also known as Tenjen Lama Sherpa, was a Nepalese mountaineer who climbed all 14 eight-thousanders together with Kristin Harila in 92 days. He went missing after an avalanche hit on Shishapangma on 7 October 2023. He was declared dead by Chinese authorities on 8 October 2023.

== Climbing career ==
On 15 May 2019, he and his brothers established the record Most siblings to climb Kangchenjunga. On 27 July 2023, Tenjen Lama Sherpa became the 50th recorded mountaineer to have successfully climbed all 14 eight thousanders. Since 27 July 2023, together with Kristin Harila, he held the record as the fastest person to reach the summit of all 14 peaks above 8,000 metres, which they did in 92 days. They used helicopters to move between base camps and added supplemental oxygen.

Tenjen worked as a climbing guide for the Nepalese adventure company Seven Summit Treks.

=== 2016 ===
- Dhaulagiri

=== 2017 ===
- Ama Dablam
- Manaslu

=== 2018 ===
- Everest
- Lhotse
- Manaslu
- Ama Dablam

=== 2019 ===
- Kangchenjunga – 15 May 2019

=== 2021 ===
- Everest
- Lhotse
- Dhaulagiri
- Ama Dablam

=== 2022 ===
- Everest
- Lhotse
- Makalu (2 times)
- Nanga Parbat

=== 2023 ===
- Manaslu – 6 January 2023 – Winter summit.
- Shishapangma – 26 April 2023.
- Cho Oyu – 3 May 2023
- Makalu – 13 May 2023
- Kangchenjunga – 18 May 2023
- Mount Everest – 23 May 2023
- Lhotse – 23 May 2023
- Dhaulagiri – 29 May 2023
- Annapurna – 5 June 2023
- Manaslu – 10 June 2023
- Nanga Parbat – 26 June 2023
- Gasherbrum II – 15 July 2023
- Gasherbrum I – 18 July 2023
- Broad Peak – 23 July 2023
- K2 – 27 July 2023
- Manaslu – autumn 2023
- Dhaulagiri – autumn 2023

== Death ==
Lama was guiding American climber Gina Marie Rzucidlo, when they were lost in an avalanche on Shishapangma. At the time, Rzucidlo was vying with Anna Gutu to become the first American woman to climb all 14 of the eight-thousanders, a rivalry some have suggested as why the pair kept climbing despite deteriorating weather conditions.

== See also ==
- Nirmal Purja, a previous speed record-holder for ascents of all 14 eight-thousanders
- Kim Chang-ho (climber), a previous holder of world speed record for all 14 eight-thousanders
