= Seven Summit Treks =

Nepalese adventure operating company

Seven Summit Treks P. Ltd
- Type: Private limited company
- Industry: Adventure sport & Mountaineering
- Founded: 2009; 17 years ago
- Founder: Mingma Sherpa
- Headquarters: Kathmandu, Nepal
- Key people: Thaneswar Guragai
- Website: https://www.sevensummittreks.com

Seven Summit Treks is a commercial adventure operator established in 2010 based in Kathmandu, Nepal. They specialize in expedition climbing trips to the eight-thousanders of Nepal, China, and Pakistan. The company was established by four Sherpa brothers, Mingma Sherpa, Chhang Dawa Sherpa, Tashi Lakpa Sherpa and Pasang Phurba Sherpa. Mingma and Chhang Dawa are the first siblings and first South Asians to have climbed all 8000ers.

Lit up tents of Seven Summit Treks seen at Everest base camp

In 2019, Seven Summit Treks was recognized as the largest royalty/taxpayer firm of Nepal, having organised the highest number of climbing expeditions in the Nepal Himalayas. Seven Summit Treks gained popularity from managing logistics for a number of pioneers and veteran climbers like Alex Txikon and Carlos Soria Fontán.

== Associated climbers ==
- Kami Rita Sherpa – 31 ascents of Mount Everest
- Sanu Sherpa – summited all 14 8000ers twice
- Shehroze Kashif – the youngest person to summit both Everest and K2
- Lakpa Dendi Sherpa – fastest triple summit of Everest from basecamp to summit on 13, 18, and 24 May 2018
- Sona Sherpa – part of the first team to summit K2 in winter
- Kristin Harila – summited all 14 8000ers within three months
- Tenjen Sherpa – summited all 14 8000ers within three months with Kristin Harila
- Allie Pepper – summited three 8000ers without bottled oxygen
- Lucia Janičová – first Slovak woman to summit Mt. Everest
- Andrzej Bargiel – skied down Everest in September 2025 after climbing with no bottled oxygen

== Notable expeditions ==
- K2 Winter Expedition 2020/21: 10 climbers from an international expedition made the first winter summit on 16 January 2021.
- Nanga Parbat Expedition 2023: 29 climbers, the biggest team in history, climbed Nanga Parbat in the summer of 2023.
- Shisha Pangma Expedition 2024: 29 climbers successfully reached the summit of Shisha Pangma; 12 of these were climbing their 14th 8000er.

== Controversy ==
In 2018 Seven Summit Treks guided two climbers up Mount Everest without valid permits. As a result Seven Summit Treks was fined $44,000 USD. The two climbers were investigated for climbing Everest without a permit, and the company claimed the permit was forged by a former employee.

In 2020/2021, the 2021 K2 Disaster occurred with Seven Summit Treks clients on the mountain. Speculation ensued regarding the company's culpability in the disaster following the release of The Last First: Winter K2, where the alleged negligence of the Seven Summit Treks' team is displayed.

== Deaths during expeditions ==
Name	Date	Age	Expedition	Nationality	Cause of death	Location	Remains status	Refs
Lam Babu Sherpa	May 14, 2018	45	Mount Everest	Nepal	Disappearance (reportedly suffered from snow blindness)	Above South Col	Not recovered	
Damai Sarki Sherpa	May 21, 2018	37	Mount Everest	Nepal	Fall	Camp II	Evacuated, succumbed to head injury	
Wui Kin Chin	May 2, 2019	49	Annapurna	Malaysia	Multiple injuries and complications, including severe hypothermia and frostbite, sustained after being stranded without food, water, or supplementary oxygen for 40 hours.	7,500 metres	Evacuated, succumbed to injuries.	
Séamus (Shay) Lawless	May 16, 2019	39	Mount Everest	Ireland	Presumed dead after fall	Balcony	Not recovered	
Dipankar Ghosh	May 2019	53	Makalu	India	Altitude sickness	above Camp IV	Recovered	
Ravi Thakar	May 17, 2019	28	Mount Everest	India	Altitude sickness	Camp IV	Recovered	
Puwei Liu	May 12, 2021	55	Mount Everest	United States	Exhaustion, snow blindness	Turned back at Hillary Step (8800m)	Recovered, died in Camp IV	
Abdul Waraich	May 12, 2021	41	Mount Everest	Switzerland	Exhaustion	8350m South Summit	Recovered	
Joshua Cheruiyot Kirui	May 22, 2024	40	Mount Everest	Kenya	Fall	Below the Summit	Remains found in 2024	
Nawang Sherpa	May 22, 2024		Mount Everest	Nepal	Disappeared	Below the Summit	Not recovered	
Rima Rinje Sherpa	April 8, 2025	27	Annapurna	Nepal	Avalanche		Recovered	
Ngima Tashi Sherpa	April 8, 2025	32	Annapurna	Nepal	Avalanche		Recovered	
Ngima Dorji Sherpa	May 2025		Mount Everest	Nepal	Heart attack	Base camp	Recovered	
