= Dawa Ongju Sherpa =

Nepalese mountaineer

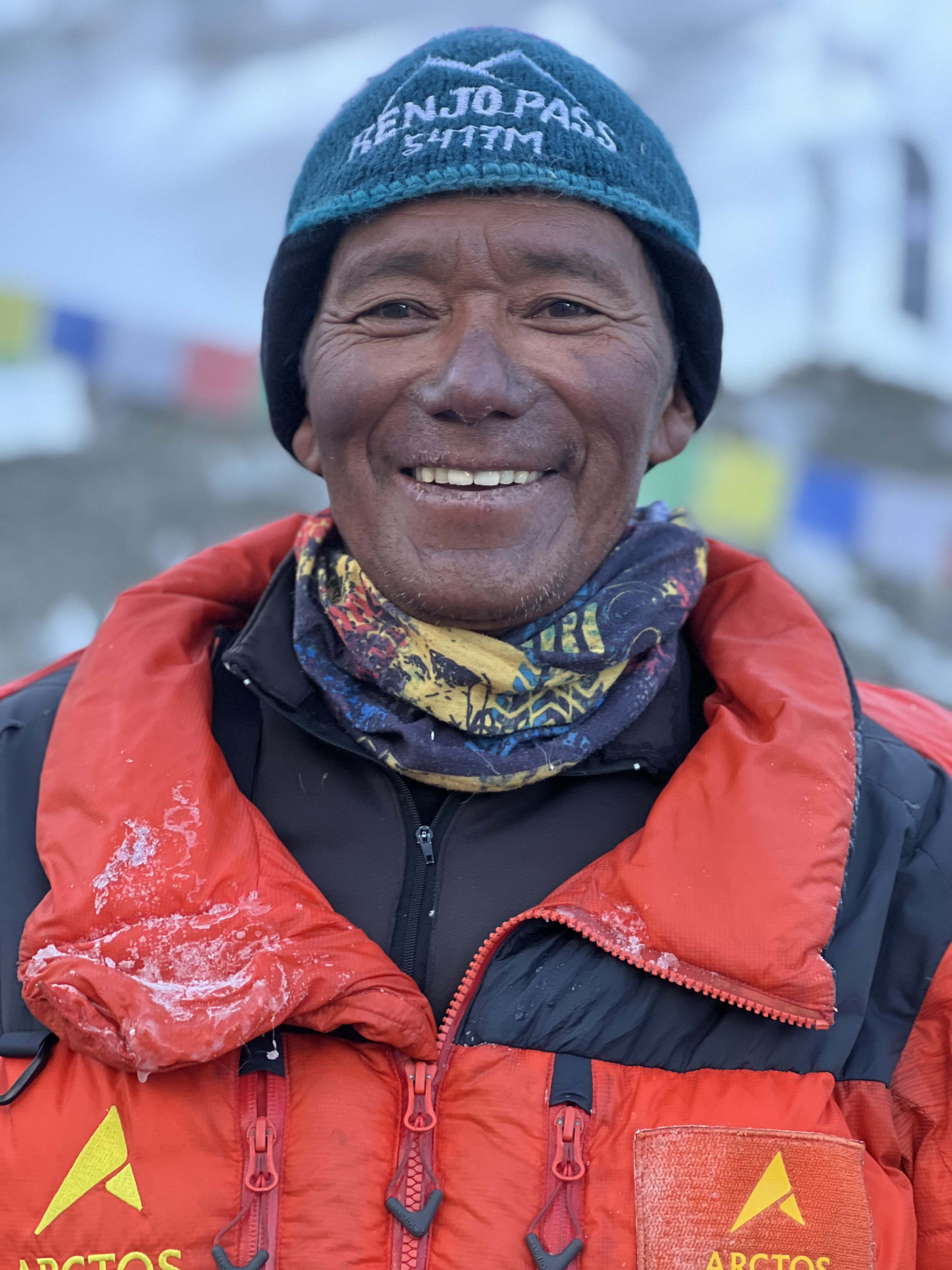

Personal information
- Nationality: Nepalese
- Born: 17 December 1972 (age 53) Makalu, Nepal
- Spouse: Jibu Sherpa
- Children: Lakpa Renji Sherpa, Nang Tenji Sherpa (Sons), Pasang Lhamu Sherpa (Daughter)

Dawa Ongju Sherpa- Nepali: दावा ओङ्जु शेर्पा (born December 17, 1972) is a Nepalese Sherpa mountaineer. He has climbed 13 of the 14 highest peaks in the world.

== Early life ==
Born in Makalu Village, Sankhuwasabha district, Nepal, Dawa is the fifth child, among seven siblings, from his father Namgyal Sherpa and mother Doma Sherpa. He travelled to Darjeeling, India to work and train at the Himalayan Mountaineering Institute (HMI Darjeeling) to acquire mountaineering skills to climb the Himalayas and Karakoram.

== Mountaineering career ==
In 2000, he climbed his first eight thousander, Kangchenjunga. He continues to work on his eight thousander mission.

=== Eight thousanders ===
In 2022, Dawa attempted an ambitious goal of climbing 14 eight thousanders at a speed record. He kicked off this initiative with Pasdawa Sherpa and Kristin Harila in April 2022 and had the aim of completing it by May 2023, climbing six peaks (Annapurna (April 28, 2022), Dhaulagiri (May 8, 2022), Kangchenjunga (May 14, 2022), Everest (May 22, 2022), Lhotse (May 22, 2022) and Makalu (May 27, 2022) in just 29 days, thereby setting the record of fastest climb.

He climbed additional peaks in Pakistan and again in Nepal: Nanga Parbat (July 1, 2022), K2 (July 22, 2022), Broad Peak (July 28, 2022), Gasherbrum II (August 8, 2022), Gasherbrum I (August 11, 2022) and Manaslu on September 22, 2022, but abruptly stopped leaving Shishapangma and Cho Oyu still waiting to be climbed.

Since 2022, he has continued to climb, and as of 2025, he has added more ascents, like Everest (2024, 2025), K2 (2024), Manaslu (2024, 2025), and Ama Dablam (2024).

=== Climbing records ===
- Climbed Six 8000ers peaks located within Nepal in a record 29 days
- “Double Header” Everest Summit to Lhotse Summit - 8hrs 35mins - May 22, 2022

== Notable ascents ==
S.no	Name of mountain	Number of times	Year
1	Mount Everest (8848 m)	9	2004, 2005, 2006, 2008, 2013, 2021, 2022, 2024, 2025
2	K2 (8611 m)	2	2022, 2024
3	Kangchenjunga (8586 m)	6	2000, 2002, 2004, 2009, 2019, 2022
4	Lhotse (8516 m)	2	2012, 2022
5	Makalu (8463 m)	2	2011, 2022
6	Cho Oyu (8201 m)	1	2000
7	Dhaulagiri (8167 m)	2	2009, 2022
8	Manaslu (8163 m)	6	2008, 2021, 2022, 2023, 2024, 2025
9	Nanga Parbat (8125 m)	2	2009, 2022
10	Annapurna I (8091 m)	3	2010, 2021, 2022
11	Gasherbrum I (8068 m)	4	2005, 2008, 2009, 2022
12	Broad Peak (8047 m)	2	2003, 2022
13	Gasherbrum II (8035 m)	3	2003, 2005, 2022
14	Shishapangma (8027 m)	--	--
15	Ama Dablam (6812 m)	4	2006, 2007, 2008, 2024
