= Tejan Gurung =

Nepalese-British mountaineer

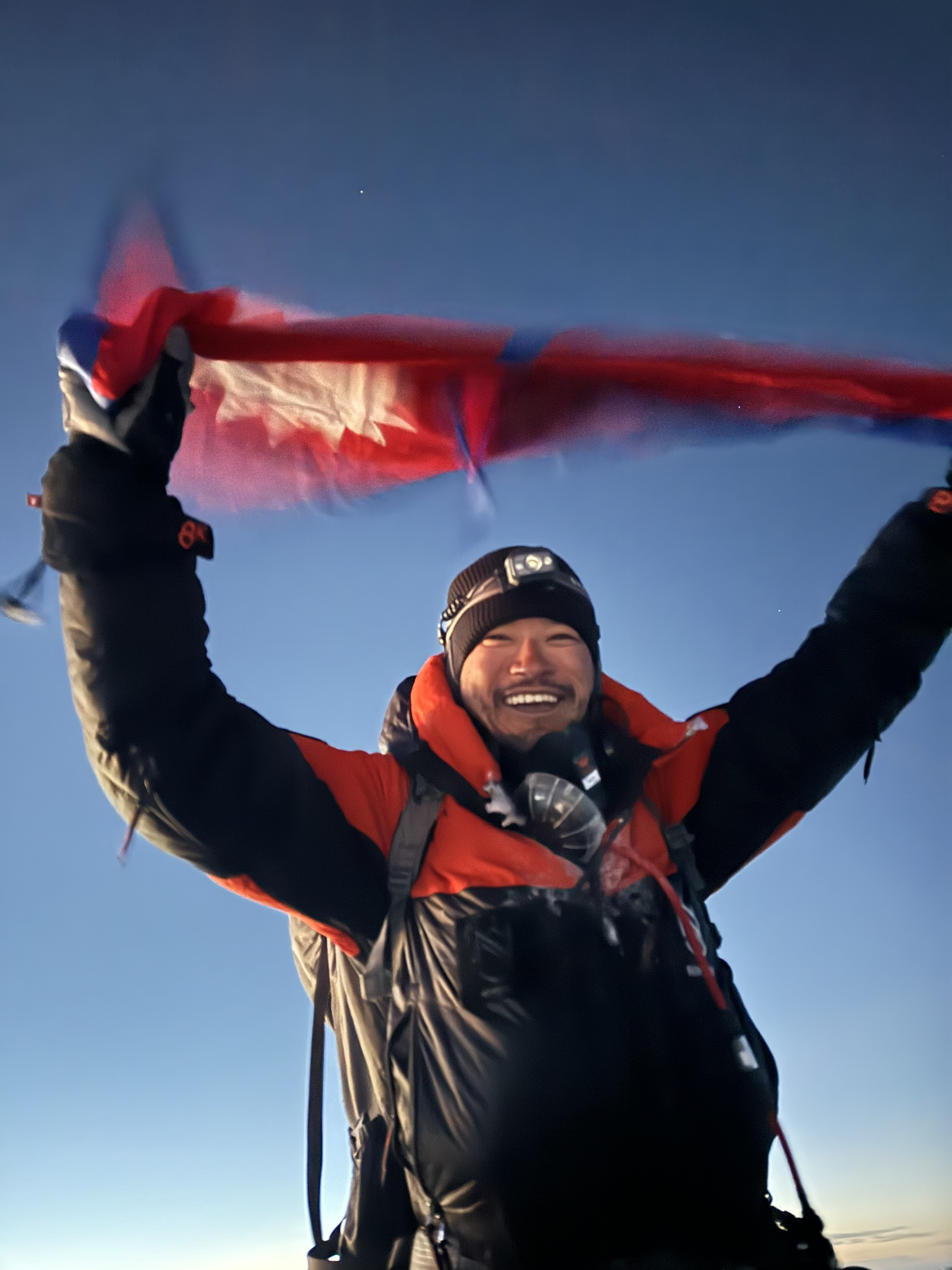
- Gurung summiting Shisha Pangma, 9 Oct 2024

Personal information
- Nationality: Nepalese, British (Nepal) (United Kingdom)
- Born: 3 February 1995 (age 31) Pokhara, Nepal
- Relative: Nirmal Purja (brother-in-law)

Climbing career
- Major ascents: Youngest British person to climb all 14 Eight-thousanders

Tejan Gurung (नेपाली: तेजन गुरुङ, born 1995) is a Nepali mountaineer known for his involvement in high-altitude climbing expeditions in the Himalayas. He has participated in multiple international expeditions, working with climbers and expedition teams from different countries. From 2022 to 2024, Gurung has climbed all the 14 eight-thousanders, being mountains above 8,000 metres (26,247 ft), and was the youngest British person to do so.

== Early life ==
Born in Pokhara, Nepal, Tejan Gurung moved to the United Kingdom with his family in 2005 following his father’s retirement from the Brigade of Gurkhas. In 2014, at the age of 19, he joined the British Army and served with the Royal Engineers. After completing the All-Arms Commando Course, he was assigned to the 24 Commando Regiment, part of 3 Commando Brigade. Gurung served for six years, during which he developed skills and experience that later influenced his mountaineering career.

== Climbing career ==
Tejan Gurung began his mountaineering career in 2017 with the ascent of Lobuche Peak (6,119 m). He climbed Mount Everest on 27 May 2022 and summited Mount Lhotse the following day, marking his first ascents of 8,000-metre peaks. After leaving the British Army in 2022, he focused full-time on high-altitude mountaineering. In 2023, Gurung completed ascents of eleven 8,000-metre mountains within a single year. These included Annapurna (15 April), Makalu (23 May), Kangchenjunga (1 June), Nanga Parbat (2 July), Gasherbrum II (17 July), Gasherbrum I (21 July), Broad Peak (25 July), K2 (28 July), Manaslu (17 September), Dhaulagiri (29 September), and Cho Oyu (2 October).

On 9 October 2024, Gurung summited Shishapangma (8,027 m) in China, completing the ascent of all fourteen mountains above 8,000 metres. In addition to his Himalayan climbs, Gurung has also ascended mountains outside Nepal, including Mount Elbrus in Russia and Aconcagua in Argentina.

== Eight-thousanders ==
List of 8,000-meter summits by Tejan Gurung
Summit Order	Peak's Rank	Mountain	Height (m)	Summit Date	O2 = Oxygen use
1	1	Everest	8,848.86	27 May 2022	O2
2	4	Lhotse	8,516	28 May 2022	O2
3	10	Annapurna I	8,091	15 April 2023	O2
4	5	Makalu	8,485	23 May 2023	O2
5	3	Kangchenjunga	8,586	1 June 2023	O2
6	9	Nanga Parbat	8,125	2 July 2023	O2
7	13	Gasherbrum II	8,034	17 July 2023	O2
8	11	Gasherbrum I	8,080	21 July 2023	O2
9	12	Broad Peak	8,051	25 July 2023	O2
10	2	K2	8,611	28 July 2023	O2
11	8	Manaslu	8,163	17 Sep 2023	O2
12	7	Dhaulagiri	8,167	29 Sep 2023	O2
13	6	Cho Oyu	8,188	2 Oct 2023	O2
14	14	Shishapangma	8,027	9 Oct 2024	O2

The total time he took to climb the 14 eight-thousanders was 2 years, 4 months, and 13 days.

During the 2023 climbing season on Shishapangma, multiple avalanches on the upper slopes resulted in the deaths of four climbers, including American mountaineer Anna Gutu. Tejan Gurung was present on the mountain at the time and later returned to complete his own summit on 9 October 2024, finishing his 14-peaks project.

== See also ==
- Nima Rinji Sherpa
- Adriana Brownlee
- Nirmal Purja
- Eight-thousander
