= Makalu (disambiguation) =

Makalu may refer to:

- Makalu, Himalayan mountain on the China–Nepal border, fifth-highest in the world
- Makalu, Sankhuwasabha, a rural municipality in Sankhuwasabha District, Nepal
- Makalu, Nepal
- UP Makalu, a German paraglider design, named for the mountain
