= Gina Marie Rzucidlo =

American mountain climber (1978–2023)

- Born: 28 January 1978; Auburn, Massachusetts, U.S.
- Died: 7 October 2023 (aged 45); Shishapangma, Tibet Autonomous Region, China
- Cause of death: Avalanche
- Occupation: High altitude mountaineer
- Known for: First American woman to climb all 3 highest peaks in the world; Attempted to become the first American woman to climb all 14 peaks above 8,000 m (completed 13 peaks, died while attempting 14th and final peak)

Gina Marie Rzucidlo (January 28, 1978 – October 7, 2023) was an American high-altitude mountaineer. She is recognized for her pursuit to become the first American woman and the third American climber to climb all 14 of the eight-thousanders (which are peaks above 8,000 meters in elevation).

== Climbing ==
Rzucidlo successfully climbed Mount Everest in May 2018, she then completed the Seven Summits in 2019 with an ascent of Carstensz Pyramid. She completed K2 in 2022, becoming the first American woman to climb the world's three highest peaks. In 2023, she summited Lhotse, Cho Oyu, and Nanga Parbat, becoming the first American woman to complete the latter. In October 2023, she was climbing Shishapangma in Tibet, the last of the 14 peaks, accompanied by Tenjen Sherpa when an avalanche occurred. She was declared dead on October 7. Anna Gutu, who was also in the last leg of competing for the title of the first American woman to climb all 14 summits, died in the avalanche as well.

In 2023, she took the Iranian Women Life Freedom flag to top of the Everest in support and to show Iranian women that they can fight for their freedom.

== Personal life ==
Born to Polish immigrants, Rzucidlo was born in Auburn, Massachusetts, and was one of seven children. She received an associate degree in science in criminal justice from Quinsigamond Community College in 1999. She lived in Manhattan prior to her death.
