= Tashi Lakpa Sherpa =

Nepalese mountaineer

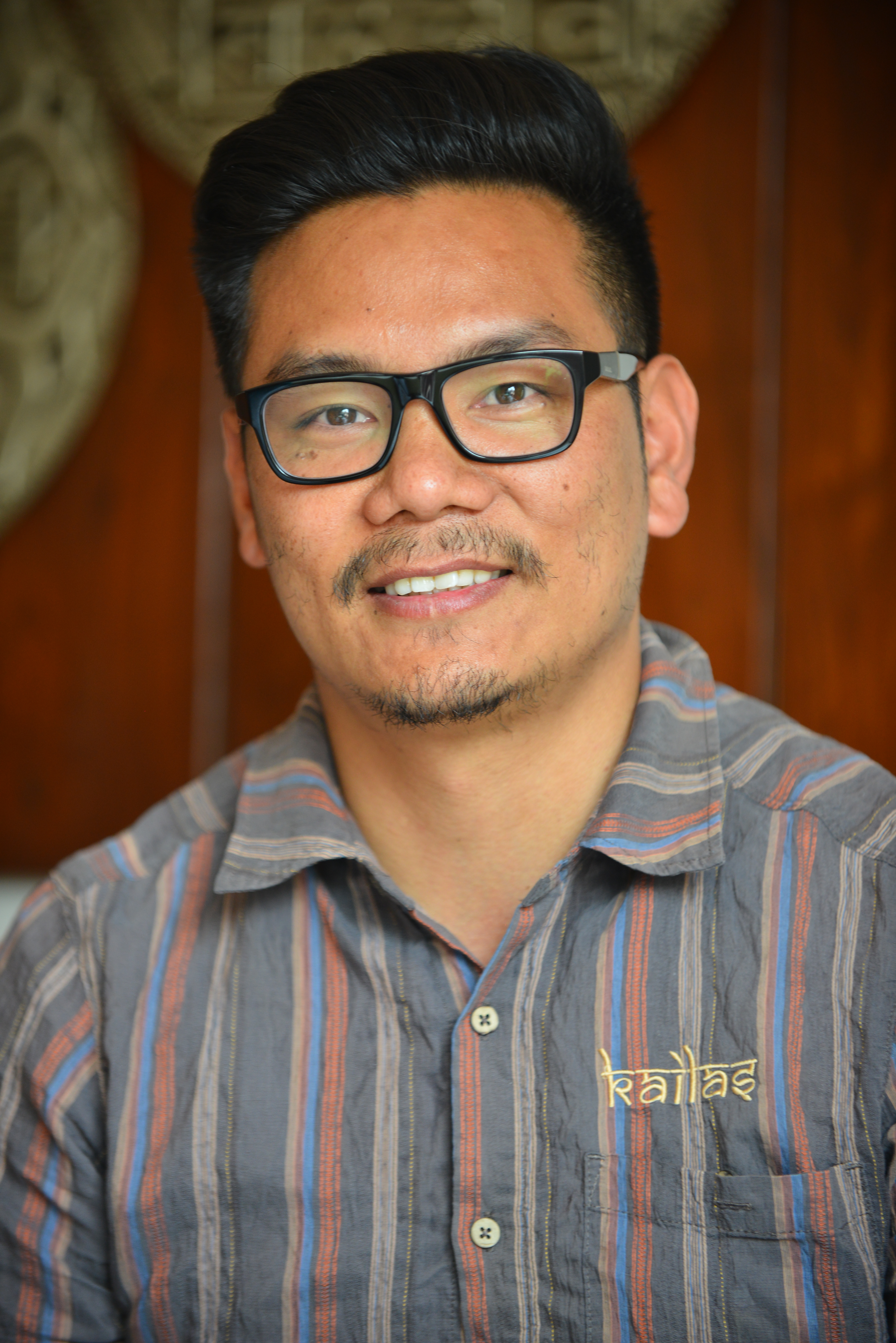
- Tashi Lakpa Sherpa

Personal information
- Nationality: Nepalese
- Born: 18 November 1985 (age 40) Makalu, Nepal
- Relatives: Chhang Dawa Sherpa & Mingma Sherpa (brothers) Nima Rinji (Son)

Climbing career
- Known for: Youngest person to climb Mt. Everest without use of supplementary oxygen.

Tashi Lakpa Sherpa (Nepali: टासी लाक्पा शेर्पा)(born 1985) in Makalu Region, Sankhuwasabha District) is a Nepalese mountaineer who climbed Mount Everest eight times, Cho Oyu twice and other 7000 metre and 6000 metre peaks. He has also climbed the Seven Summits. Everest, Denali, Elbrus, Kilimanjaro Aconcagua, Vinson and Kosciuszko.

Tashi Lakpa Sherpa is a Guinness World Records holder titled "The youngest person to climb Everest without using supplemental oxygen". In 2005 at the age of 19 Sherpa climbed the highest peak without using supplementary oxygen. Tashi and his team tried the rarest climb of Mt. Everest in Winter in 2019, though could not reach above Camp III 7300m of Everest via South Side.

== Early life ==
Born and raised in remote village named Nurbuchour (Makalu) of Sankhuwasabha District, Sherpa spent his earlier days as a herdsman grazing the sheep, goats and yaks in the yards and the forest. When he was 16, he came to the capital city, Kathmandu, took basic wall and rock climbing trainings. In 2004 Tashi climbed Mt. Everest as his first mountain to climb and also the first 8000ers. Then he joined climbing activities along with his two brothers Chhang Dawa and Mingma Sherpa.

== 8000m and other mountains climbed by Tashi Lakpa ==
S.No.	Peak	Height	Years
1	Everest	8848m	2004, 2005, 2006, 2007 (twice), 2010 (twice), 2011, 2021
2	Cho Oyu	8188m	2006, 2011
3	Ama Dablam	6814m	2005, 2009 (twice), 2013 & 2020
4	Manaslu	8163m	2020

== Seven Summits by Tashi Lakpa Sherpa ==
S.no	Name of Peak	Year
1	Mount Everest (8848 m)	2004, 2005, 2006, 2007 (twice), 2010 (twice), 2011, 2021
2	Aconcagua (6961m)	2020 (Jan), 2020 (Feb)
3	Denali (6194m)	2017
4	Kilimanjaro (5859m)	2017
5	Mount Elbrus (5642m)	2017
6	Mount Vinson (4892m)	2022 (Jan), 2023 (Jan)
7	Puncak Jaya / Carstenz (4884m)	2024 (Oct)

== Pole Explorer ==
S.no	Degree	Year
1	South Pole	2022(Jan)
