= Mingma Sherpa =

Nepalese Sherpa mountaineer

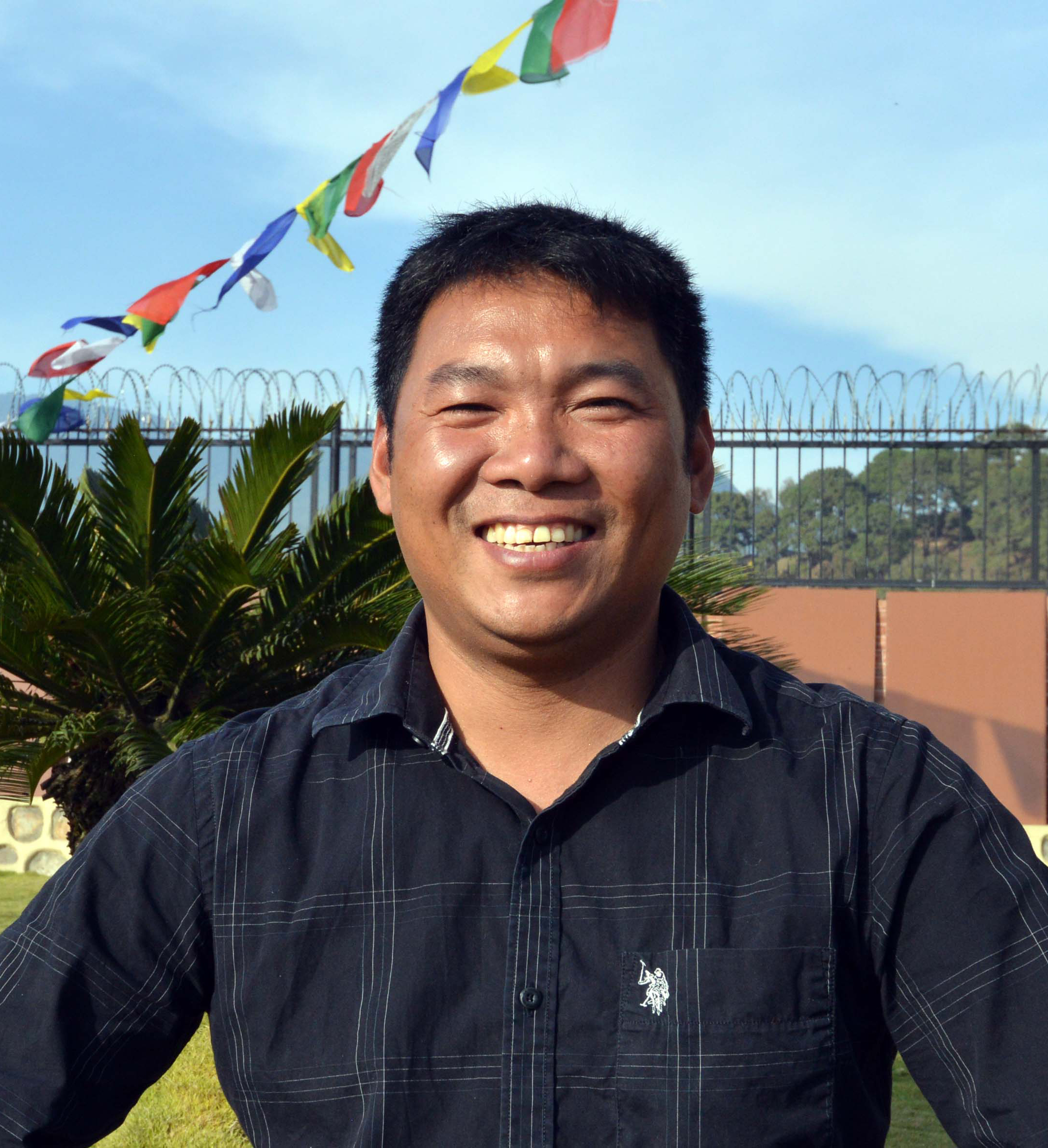

Personal information
- Nationality: Nepalese
- Born: 16 June 1978 (age 48) Makalu, Nepal
- Relative: Chhang Dawa Sherpa Tashi Lakpa Sherpa (brother)

Climbing career
- Known for: First Nepali and first South Asian to summit the 14 highest peaks in the world (8000ers); First mountaineer to summit all 14 peaks on first attempt

Mingma Sherpa (Nepali: मिङ्मा शेर्पा; born June 16, 1978) is a Nepali mountaineer from Makalu Village, which is located in Sankhuwasabha district of Nepal. On May 20, 2011, Mingma Sherpa became the first person from Nepal and the first South Asian to scale all 14 eight thousanders. He also set a new world record by becoming the first mountaineer to climb all 14 peaks on the first attempt. Mingma Sherpa and his brother, Chhang Dawa Sherpa, hold the Guinness World Records of the world's first two brothers to successfully summit the 14 eight thousanders

By October 2024, Mingma and Chhang Dawa successfully completed their mission of ascending the Seven Summits, which are the seven highest peaks on each continent. This achievement made them the first siblings to achieve this feat.

== Journey to Eight thousanders ==
The Sherpa brothers used supplementary oxygen only on the four highest mountains out of all 8000ers. They climbed all eight thousanders with no sponsor. Until Mingma climbed nine 8000ers as a Sherpa guide and then went to Japan for work. In 2009 Mingma returned to Nepal and climbed the remaining 5 other 8000ers.

Mingma Sherpa is the managing director of Seven Summit Treks, which organizes expedition over the Himalayas in Nepal, China and Pakistan.

== Awards ==
Jana Sewa Shree: In 2023, Mingma Sherpa was honoured with the Jana Sewa Shree Fifth medal by Ram Chandra Poudel at a special ceremony held at the Office of the President in Kathmandu, Nepal.

== Ascent of unclimbed peak ==
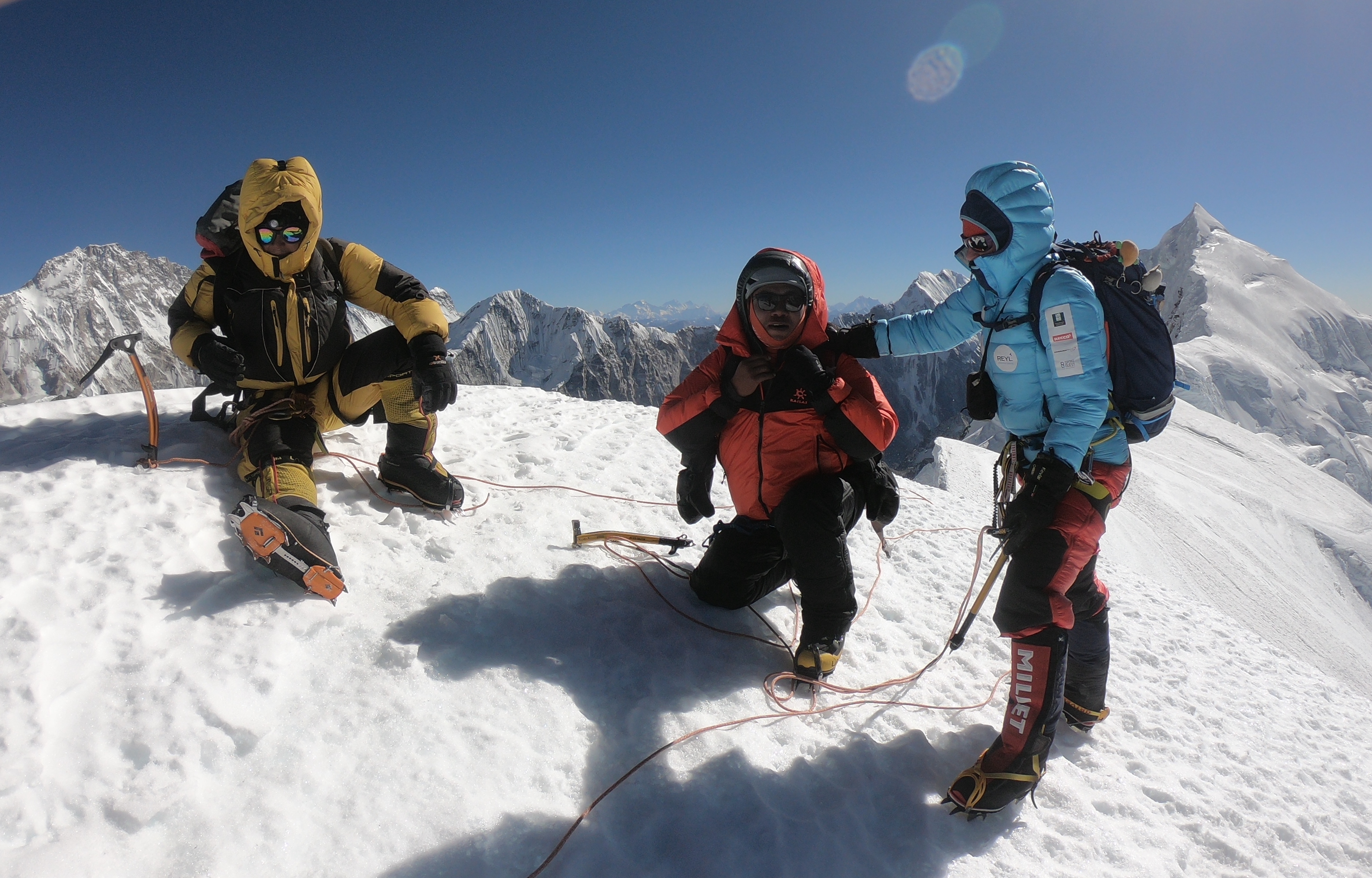
(From left to right) Tenjing Sherpa, Mingma Sherpa and Sophie Lavaud on the summit of Kyungya Ri 2 peak

In 2020 - Dec 11, Mingma Sherpa along with Swiss Climber Sophie Lavaud, Dawa Sangay and Tenjing Sherpa made first ever summit of Kyungya Ri 2 peak (6506m) located in Langtang Valley.

== 8000m Peaks summited by Mingma Sherpa ==
S.no	Name of mountain	Year
1	Mount Everest (8848 m)	2004 (spring)
2	K2 (8611 m)	2004 (summer)
3	Kangchenjunga (8586 m)	2011 (spring)
4	Lhotse (8516 m)	2002 (spring)
5	Makalu (8463 m)	2001 (spring)
6	Cho Oyu (8201 m)	2000 (autumn), 2002 (autumn)
7	Dhaulagiri (8167 m)	2010 (spring)
8	Manaslu (8163 m)	2000 (spring), 2020 (Autumn)
9	Nanga Parbat (8125 m)	2010 (summer)
10	Annapurna I (8091 m)	2010 (spring)
11	Gasherbrum I (8068 m)	2010 (summer)
12	Broad Peak (8047 m)	2003 (summer)
13	Gasherbrum II (8035 m)	2003 (summer)
14	Shishapangma (8027 m)	2001 (autumn)

== Seven Summits by Mingma Sherpa ==
S.no	Name of mountain	Year
1	Mount Everest (8848 m)	2004 (spring)
2	Aconcagua (6961m)	2022 (Jan)
3	Denali (6194m)	2022 (June)
4	Kilimanjaro (5859m)	2022 (Feb)
5	Mount Elbrus (5642m)	2022 (July)
6	Mount Vinson (4892m)	2022 (Jan)
7	Puncak Jaya / Carstenz (4884m)	2024 (Oct)

== Pole Explore ==
S.no	Name of mountain	Year
1	South Pole	2022(Jan)
