= Anna Gutu =

American mountaineer (1990/1991–2023)

- Анна Гуту
- Born: 1990 or 1991; Odesa, Ukraine
- Died: October 7, 2023 (aged 31–32); Shishapangma, China
- Cause of death: Avalanche
- Citizenship: American; Ukrainian
- Occupation: High altitude mountaineer
- Known for: Attempt to become the first American woman to climb all 14 peaks above 8,000 meters

Anna Gutu (Note: Ukrainian: Анна Гуту, romanized: Anna Hutu) (1990 or 1991 – October 7, 2023) was a Ukrainian and American climber and high-altitude mountaineer. She is known for her pursuit to become the first American woman, and the third overall American climber, to climb all 14 of the eight-thousanders (which are peaks above 8,000 meters in elevation).

== Climbing ==
In 2023, Gutu summited Dhaulagiri (June), Kangchenjunga (September), and Cho Oyu (October). In October, she was climbing her final ascent, Shishapangma in Tibet, with Mingma Sherpa, her Nepalese guide, when she was killed in an avalanche. Gina Marie Rzucidlo, who was also in the last leg of competing for the title of the first American woman to climb all 14 summits, died in the avalanche shortly afterwards.

== Personal life ==
A U.S. citizen, Gutu was born in Odesa, Ukraine in 1990 or 1991. Gutu recorded many of her climbs on social media. Near the time of her death, she had 38,000 followers on Instagram.
