= Chhang Dawa Sherpa =

Nepalese Sherpa mountaineer

Personal information
- Born: July 30, 1982 (age 44) Makalu, Nepal
- Relative: Mingma Sherpa Tashi Lakpa Sherpa (brother)

Climbing career
- Known for: Second Nepalease and Second South Asian to summit the 14 highest peaks in the world (8000ers)

Chhang Dawa Sherpa (Nepali: छाङ दावा शेर्पा): (born July 30, 1982) is a Nepalese mountaineer and the youngest climber till 2019 to summit the 14 highest peaks. Dawa and his brother Mingma Sherpa together hold the world record as "first brothers to summit the 14 highest peaks", a single record shared by the two.

By October 2024, Chhang Dawa and Mingma successfully completed their mission of ascending the Seven Summits, which are the seven highest peaks on each continent. This achievement made them the first siblings to accomplish this feat.

== Early life ==
Chhang Dawa Sherpa was born and grew up in the rural village of Narbuchaur in Makalu Village of Sankhuwasabha District in Nepal.

Dawa as his first 8000ers, first reached the summit of Makalu (8485 m) on 14 May 2001 without supplementary oxygen being youngest person along with his brother Mingma Sherpa. He and his brother Mingma Sherpa attained the Guinness world record of "World's First Two Brothers" to successfully summit the 14 mountains of the world which are over 8000 meters in height. Sherpa brothers used supplementary oxygen only on four highest 8000ers among all fourteen. They now operate the expedition company named Seven Summits Treks, which organize climbs and treks throughout Nepal, Pakistan and China.

== First Ascent ==
28 April in 2010, Chhang Dawa Sherpa along with Carlos Soria Fontán, Tente Lagunilla and Sherpa's team made the first ascent of Mt. Dome Khang (7,260m).

== Mountains summited ==
S.no	Name of mountain	Year	Season	Height (m.)	Country
1	Makalu	2001	Spring	8485	Nepal
1	Lhotse	2002	Spring	8516	Nepal
3	Cho-Oyu	2002	Autumn	8188	China
4	Mount Everest	2003	Spring	8848	China
5	Mount Everest	2004	Spring	8848	China
6	Mount Everest	2005	Spring	8848	Nepal
7	Makalu	2008	Spring	8485	Nepal
8	Broad Peak	2008	Summer	8047	Pakistan
9	Dome Kang	2009	Spring	7260	Nepal
10	Nanga Parbat	2010	Summer	8125	Pakistan
11	G-I	2010	Summer	8080	Pakistan
12	Manaslu	2010	Autumn	8163	Nepal
13	Langtang Lirung	2010	Autumn	7234	Nepal
14	Kanchanjunga	2011	Spring	8586	Nepal
15	G-I	2011	Summer	8080	Pakistan
16	G-II	2011	Summer	8034	Pakistan
17	Manaslu	2011	Autumn	8163	Nepal
18	Annapurna I	2012	Spring	8091	Nepal
19	Dhaulagiri I	2012	Spring	8167	Nepal
20	K-2	2012	Summer	8611	Pakistan
21	Shisha Pangma	2013	Spring	8027	China
22	Dhaulagiri I	2014	Spring	8167	Nepal
23	Manaslu	2020	Autumn	8163	Nepal
24	Annapurna	2024	Spring	8091	Nepal
25	Manaslu	2024	Autumn	8163	Nepal

== Leading in 8000ers ==
- K2 Expedition: Chhang Dawa has been leading expedition in the Karakorum including K2 since 2012-current.
- K2 Winter 2020/2021: 2 Nepali teams led by Nirmal Puja and Mingma "G" Gelje managed to climb K2 in winter for the first time. One member of Chhang Dawa's team was among the 10 Nepalease climbers together at the top. Chhang Dawa himself stayed in base camp.
- Nanga Parbat 2023: 60 total ascents in a single day including 29 alone from Chhang's team.
- Shisha Pangma 2024: Twenty-nine climbers successfully reached the summit of Shisha Pangma, including 12 individuals who completed the challenging 14 Peaks journey.
- Everest Autumn 2025: In September 2025, Polish ski mountaineer Andrzej Bargiel became the first person to ski down Mount Everest without supplemental oxygen, a feat never before accomplished in mountaineering history. The expedition was managed and directed by Chhang Dawa Sherpa of Seven Summit Treks and supported by Red Bull.

== Seven Summits by Chhang Dawa Sherpa ==
S.no	Name of mountain	Year
1	Mount Everest (8848 m)	2004 (spring)
2	Aconcagua (6961m)	2022 (Jan)
3	Denali (6194m)	2022 (June)
4	Kilimanjaro (5859m)	2019 (Nov)
5	Mount Elbrus (5642m)	2018 (Aug)
6	Mount Vinson (4892m)	2022 (Jan)
7	Puncak Jaya / Carstenz (4884m)	2024 (Oct)

== Pole Explore ==
S.no	Name of mountain	Year
1	South Pole	2022(Jan)

== Rescue Missions ==
In the spring of 2023, Indian climber Anurag Maloo fell into a deep crevasse. Dawa, along with six Sherpas and two Polish climbers, conducted a rescue operation and successfully brought Anurag back to safety.

== See also ==
- List of Mount Everest summiteers by number of times to the summit
