= Adriana Brownlee =

British mountaineer (born 2001)

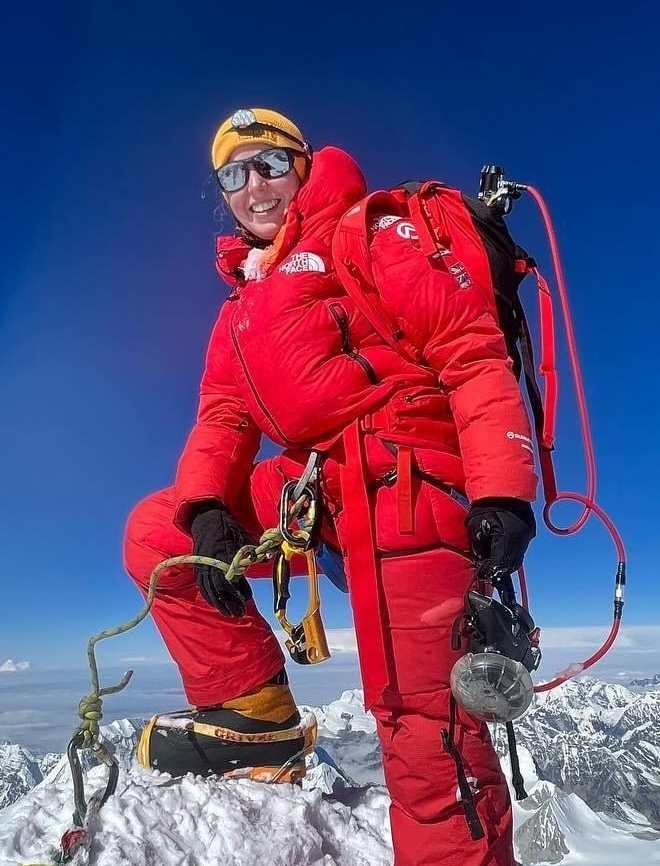
- Born: 8 January 2001 (age 25); London, England
- Citizenship: British and Spanish
- Education: University of Bath
- Occupation: Mountaineer
- Known for: Youngest woman to climb K2
- Website: adrianabrownlee.com

Adriana Brownlee (born 8 January 2001) is a British mountaineer, certified paragliding pilot and adventure athlete. She is the youngest woman to have climbed the world's second-highest peak K2 on 28 July 2022 and youngest woman to climb all 14 of the eight-thousanders on 9 October 2024.

== Early life and education ==
Brownlee was born in London. Her father, Tony, introduced her to mountains through the National Three Peaks Challenge, which she completed successfully in 22 hours when she was 9 years old. She attended Tiffin Girls' School until 2019, and then became a student at the University of Bath.

== Climbing career ==
Brownlee along with her father had successfully climbed Mount Elbrus, Kilimanjaro, and Aconcagua, before she turned 18. She then climbed the Matterhorn and Mont Blanc, both mountains in two and a half days.

Brownlee reached the summit of Mount Everest on 31 May 2021. After summiting Mount Everest, she took up Manaslu and summited on 27 September. She summited Dhaulagiri on October 7. Brownlee summited Annapurna on 28 April, followed by Kanchenjunga, Lhotse, and Makalu in May. In July 2022, she set on her expedition to summit Nanga Parbat, Broad Peak, and K2, by summiting K2 she became the youngest woman to climb the world's second-highest peak on 28 July 2022.

On 9 October 2024, Brownlee became the first British woman to climb all of the eight-thousanders.

She was appointed the ambassador of BRIT (British Inspiration Trust), which works for raising awareness on mental well-being and health in young adults.

== Mountaineering expeditions ==
- Mount Everest, 8,849m (2021)
- Manaslu, 8,153m (2021)
- Dhaulagiri, 8,167m (2021)
- Annapurna, 8,091m (2022)
- Kangchenjunga, 8,586m (2022)
- Lhotse, 8,516m (2022)
- Makalu, 8,481m (2022)
- Nanga Parbat, 8,126m (2022)
- Broad Peak, 8,051m (2022)
- K2, 8,611m (2022)
- Gasherbrum II, 8,035m (2023)
- Gasherbrum I, 8,080m (2023)
- Cho Oyu, 8,188m (2023)
- Shishapangma, 8,027m (2024)
