= Kristin Harila =

Norwegian mountaineer (born 1986)

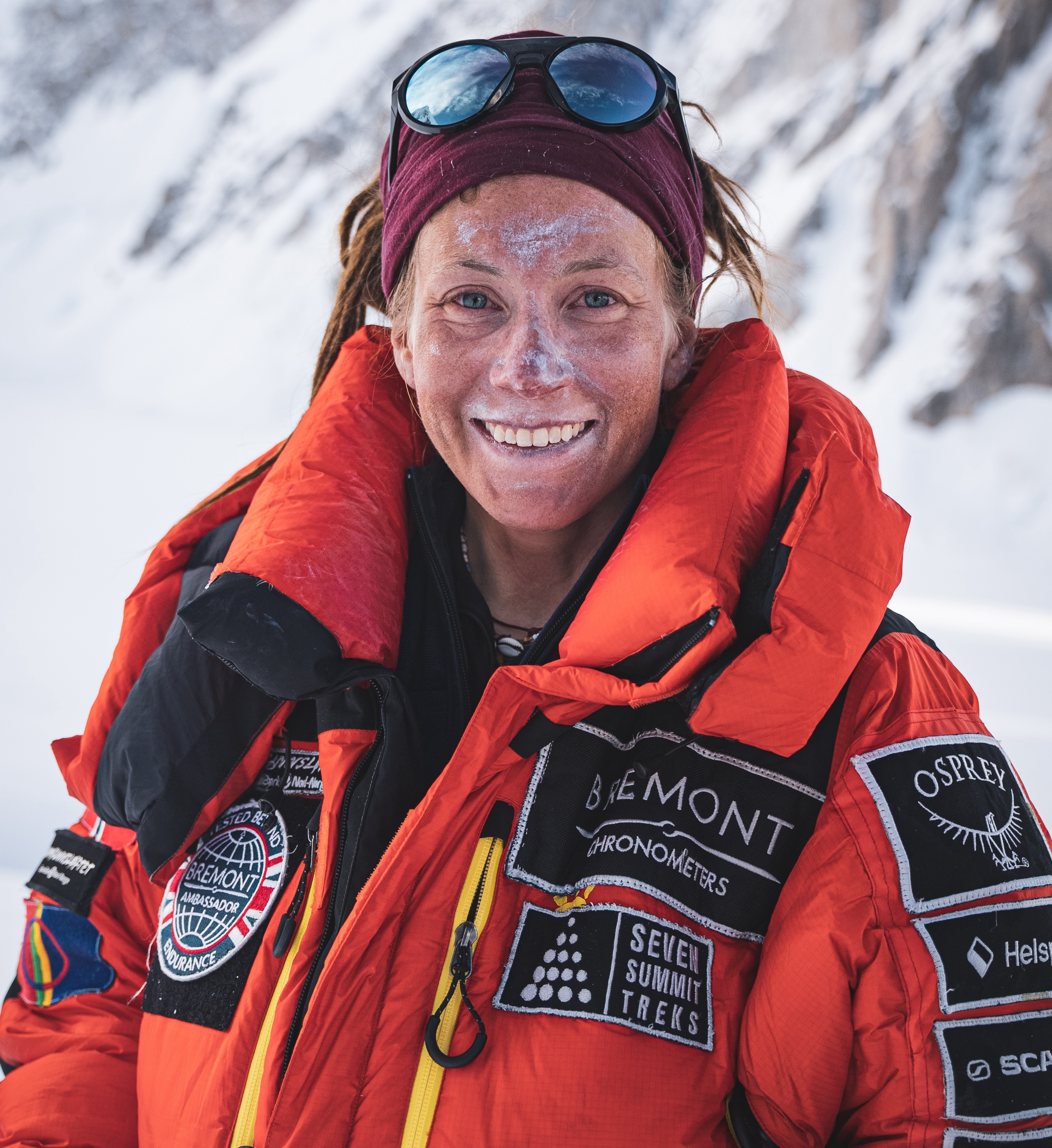
- Harila in 2023

Personal information
- Born: 28 March 1986 (age 40) Vestre Jakobselv, Vadsø Municipality, Norway
- Website: www.kristinharila.com

Climbing career
- Known for: Fastest to climb all 14 eight-thousanders in 92 days.; Fastest to climb Everest and Lhotse by a woman in 8 hours.

Kristin Harila (born 28 March 1986) is a Norwegian mountaineer and former cross-country skier. During 2022–2023, she set multiple speed records for the ascent of all 14 eight-thousanders with climbing partner Tenjen Sherpa. On 27 July 2023, she and Tenjen set the new world record for the fastest ascent of all 14 8000m peaks in 92 days.

== Climbing career ==
=== First Record Attempt (2022) ===
In 2022, Kristin Harila began her first attempt to climb the 14 highest mountain peaks in the world. She first reached the summit of Annapurna on 28 April. Mount Everest and Lhotse were the fourth and fifth mountains. On 22 May, she summited both peaks, setting a new record in moving between the peaks in less than 8.5 hours. She summited the 12th mountain in the attempt, Manaslu, on 22 September. With over 5 weeks remaining to set a new world record, the attempt was halted by COVID-19 restrictions.

During the attempt, Harila also set the world record in climbing the world's five highest mountains, Mount Everest, K2, Kanchenjunga, Lhotse and Makalu, in 69 days.

=== World Record (2023) ===
In spring 2023, Harila decided to make another attempt at climbing the 14 peaks and breaking the six month and six day speed record set by Nirmal Purja in 2019. A crucial part of her team was her climbing partner, Tenjen Lama Sherpa.

On 26 April 2023, Harila and Tenjen summited Shishapangma, marking the start of Harila's second attempt. During the expedition, Harila and her team summited Mount Everest and Lhotse on the same day, beating her own record from the year before, this time moving between the two peaks in approximately 8 hours.

Harila and Tenjen summited K2, the 14th and final mountain of the expedition, on 27 July 2023, and by doing so set a new world record for fastest ascent of all 14 eight-thousanders in 92 days. The previous record was held by Nirmal Purja, who summited the mountains in 6 months and 6 days.

==== Accident on K2 ====
Whilst ascending K2 in 2023, Harila and her team found a man, Mohammad Hassan, hanging upside down in the bottleneck-section of the mountain in the middle of the night. He was a porter for Lela Peak Expeditions, a Pakistani guiding company, and was not a part of Harila's team. Aerial drone recorded video footage showed many people including Harila and her team stepping over Hassan, who had slipped from a ledge, and continuing on their journey to the summit. Harila insisted that she and her team did everything they could to save Hassan, who later perished, but pressed on due to precarious conditions. The Pakistani government later determined in an official report that no one was to be blamed for the accident other than the climbing company Hassan worked for, Lela Peak Expeditions. The company was accused of not training their sherpas and porters properly and not providing the correct equipment. Lela Peak Expeditions was banned from operating in Pakistan for two years following the event.

==== Everest Triple Crown (2026) ====
On 27 May, Harila became the first female mountaineer to complete a feat dubbed the 'Everest Triple Crown', which involves reaching the summit of Mount Everest, Lhotse and Nuptse. She also intended to become the first person to complete this challenge without the use of supplemental oxygen, but ultimately decided to use the aid during her ascent of Lhotse due to high winds. Everest and Nuptse were climbed without supplemental oxygen. She completed the Everest Triple Crown over the course of ten days.

== Lama Sherpa Foundation ==
On 7 October 2023 several climbers were caught in an avalanche on Shishapangma in China. It was later confirmed that Tenjen Lama Sherpa perished in the avalanche. Harila established the Lama Sherpa Foundation in memory of her climbing partner. The goal of the foundation is to continue working for the causes Tenjen was passionate about, including increasing awareness and resources to porters, guides, cooks and other workers that support mountaineering expeditions in the Himalayas.

== Other activities ==
As a cross-country skier, Harila placed 24th and 25th in the Norwegian championships in 2006. She represented the club IL Polarstjernen.

== Personal life ==
Harila is Northern Saami.

== Awards ==
- European Adventurer of the Year 2022

== Expeditions ==
=== 2015 ===
- Mount Kilimanjaro, Tanzania, 5,895m

=== 2019 ===
- Putha Hiunchuli, Nepal, 7,246m – 4 October 2019
- Lobuche East, Nepal, 6,119m

=== 2020 ===
- Aconcagua, Argentina, 6,961m
- Co Adolfo Calle, Argentina, 4,270m
- Pico Vallecitos, Argentina, 5,370m

=== 2021 ===
- Mount Everest, Nepal. 8,848m – 23 May 2021
- Lhotse, Nepal. 8,516m – 23 May 2021 – World record for the fastest woman to summit Everest and Lhotse, 12 hours.
- Ama Dablam, Nepal, 6,812m – 28 October 2021
- Island Peak, Nepal, 6,165m

=== 2022 ===
- Annapurna I 8,091m – 28 April 2022
- Dhaulagiri I 8,167m – 8 May 2022
- Kanchenjunga 8,586m – 14 May 2022
- Mount Everest 8,848m – 22 May 2022
- Lhotse 8,516m – 22 May 2022 – World record for the fastest woman to summit Everest and Lhotse, 9 hours and 5min.
- Makalu 8,481m – 27 May 2022
- Nanga Parbat 8,126m – 1 July 2022
- K2 8,611m – 22 July 2022
- Broad Peak 8,051m – 28 July 2022
- Gasherbrum II 8,035m – 8 August 2022
- Gasherbrum I 8,080m – 11 August 2022
- Manaslu 8,163m – 22 September 2022

=== 2023 ===
- Shishapangma 8,027m – 26 April 2023
- Cho Oyu 8,188m – 3 May 2023
- Makalu 8,481m – 13 May 2023
- Kangchenjunga 8,586m – 18 May 2023
- Mount Everest 8,848m – 23 May 2023
- Lhotse 8,516m – 23 May 2023 – World record for fastest woman to summit Everest and Lhotse, 8 hours.
- Dhaulagiri I 8,167m – 29 May 2023
- Annapurna I 8,091m – 5 June 2023
- Manaslu 8,163m – 10 June 2023
- Nanga Parbat 8,126m – 26 June 2023
- Gasherbrum II 8,035m – 15 July 2023
- Gasherbrum I 8,080m – 18 July 2023
- Broad Peak 8,051m – 23 July 2023
- K2 8,611m – 27 July 2023

=== 2024 ===
- Attempted solo, unsupported speed record from Hercules Inlet to the South Pole which Harila called off after an injury.

=== 2025 ===
- Vinson – 4 January 2025
- Carstensz Pyramid – 21 October 2025

=== 2026 ===
- Nuptse 7,861m – 17 May 2026 (Without supplemental oxygen)
- Lhotse 8,516m – 21 May 2026
- Everest 8,848m – 27 May 2026 (Without supplemental oxygen)

== See also ==
- Nirmal Purja, a previous speed record-holder for ascents of all 14 eight-thousanders
- Kim Chang-ho (climber), a previous holder of world speed record for all 14 eight-thousanders
