= Makalu, Nepal =

Makalu मकालु
- Village development committee
- Location in Nepal
- Coordinates: 27.74°N 87.15°E
- Country: Nepal
- Zone: Koshi Zone
- District: Sankhuwasabha District

Population (1991)
  - Total: 3,560
- Time zone: UTC+5:45 (Nepal Time)

Makalu is a village development committee near the mountain of the same name, located in Sankhuwasabha District in the Koshi Zone of north-eastern Nepal. At the time of the 1991 Nepal census it had a population of 3,560 people living in 694 individual households. in Bagmati Province, earlier a part of Narayani Zone, is one of the seventy-seven districts of Nepal. The city of Hetauda serves as the district headquarters and also as the provincial headquarters. The district covers an area of 2,426 km2 (937 sq mi) and had a population of 392,604 in 2001 and 420,477 in 2011.[2] The latest census of 2021 recorded the population of Makwanpur as 466,073.

== See also ==
- Barun Valley
