= List of climbers and mountaineers =

Mountaineers, rock climbers, and ice climbers

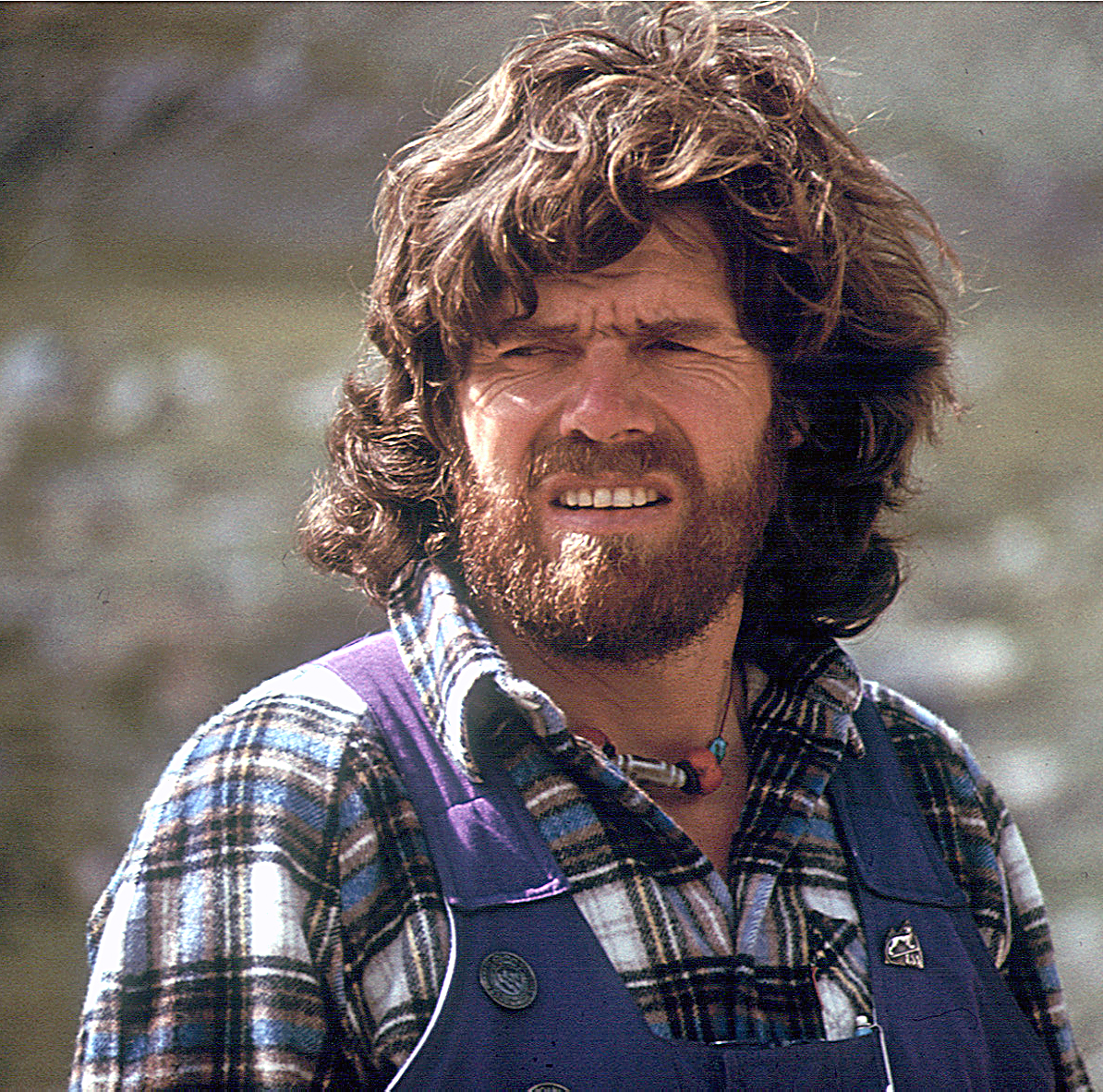
Reinhold Messner, the first mountaineer to climb all fourteen eight-thousanders

This is a list of climbers and mountaineers who are notable for their activities in mountaineering (including alpine climbing), rock climbing (including aid climbing, free climbing, bouldering, speed climbing and competition climbing) or in ice climbing (including mixed climbing).

== A ==
- Vitaly Abalakov (1906–1992) Russia, climbed Lenin Peak (1934) and Khan Tengri (1936)
- Yevgeniy Abalakov (1907–1948) Russia, climbed Communism Peak (1933)
- Premlata Agarwal (born 1963) India, first Indian woman to complete all Seven Summits
- H. P. S. Ahluwalia (fl. 1965) India, climbed Mount Everest in 1965
- Pierre Allain (1904–2000) France, developed bouldering at Fontainebleau, and rubber rock-climbing shoes
- Rick Allen (1954–2021) UK, first ascent of Mazeno Ridge, Nanga Parbat
- Christian Almer (1826–1898) Switzerland, numerous first ascents, including Eiger
- Ashraf Aman (born 1943) Pakistan, first Pakistani ascent of K2
- Luigi Amedeo, Duke of Abruzzi (1873–1933) Italy, first ascent of Mount Saint Elias, Rwenzori Mountains
- Pat Ament (born 1946) US, rock climber, and pioneer boulderer
- Melchior Anderegg (1827–1912) Switzerland, guide, with numerous first ascents, including on Mont Blanc
- Conrad Anker (born 1963) US, discovered Mallory's body on Everest in 1999
- Tyler Armstrong (born 2004) US, in 2013, at age 9, the youngest to climb Aconcagua
- Melissa Arnot (born 1983) US, six ascents of Everest
- Bernd Arnold (born 1947) Germany, more than 900 first ascents in Saxon Switzerland
- Armando Aste (1926–2017) Italy, first Italian ascent of the Eiger north face
- Peter Athans (born 1957) US, seven ascents of Mount Everest
- Peter Aufschnaiter (1899–1973) Austria, mountaineer; friend of Heinrich Harrer (per Seven Years in Tibet)
- Abdul Jabbar Bhatti, Pakistani mountaineer and the former military officer of the Pakistan Army
- Nelly Attar (born 1990) Saudi/Lebanese, was the first Arab woman to summit K2 (2022).
- Cecilia Llusco Alaña (born 1985) Bolivian, Cholita Cimber, climbed Aconcagua in Indigenous costume.

== B ==
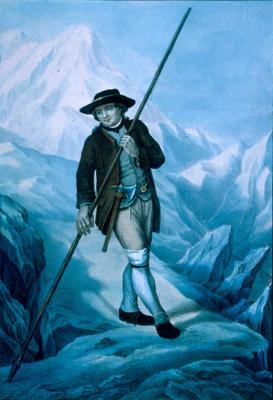
Jacques Balmat

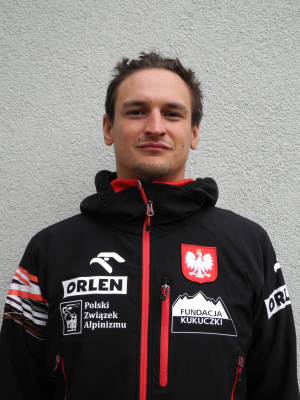
Adam Bielecki

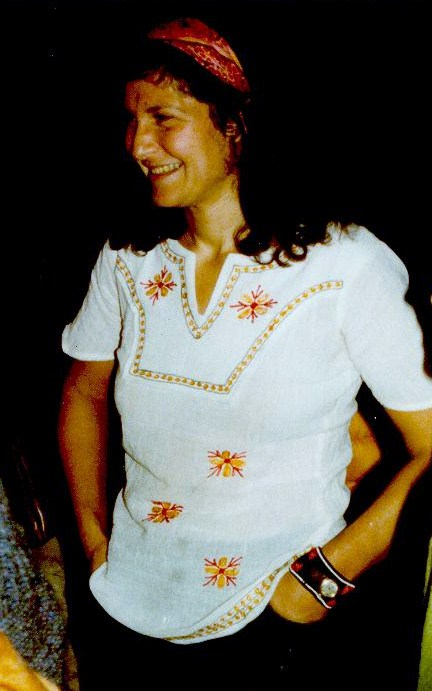
Arlene Blum

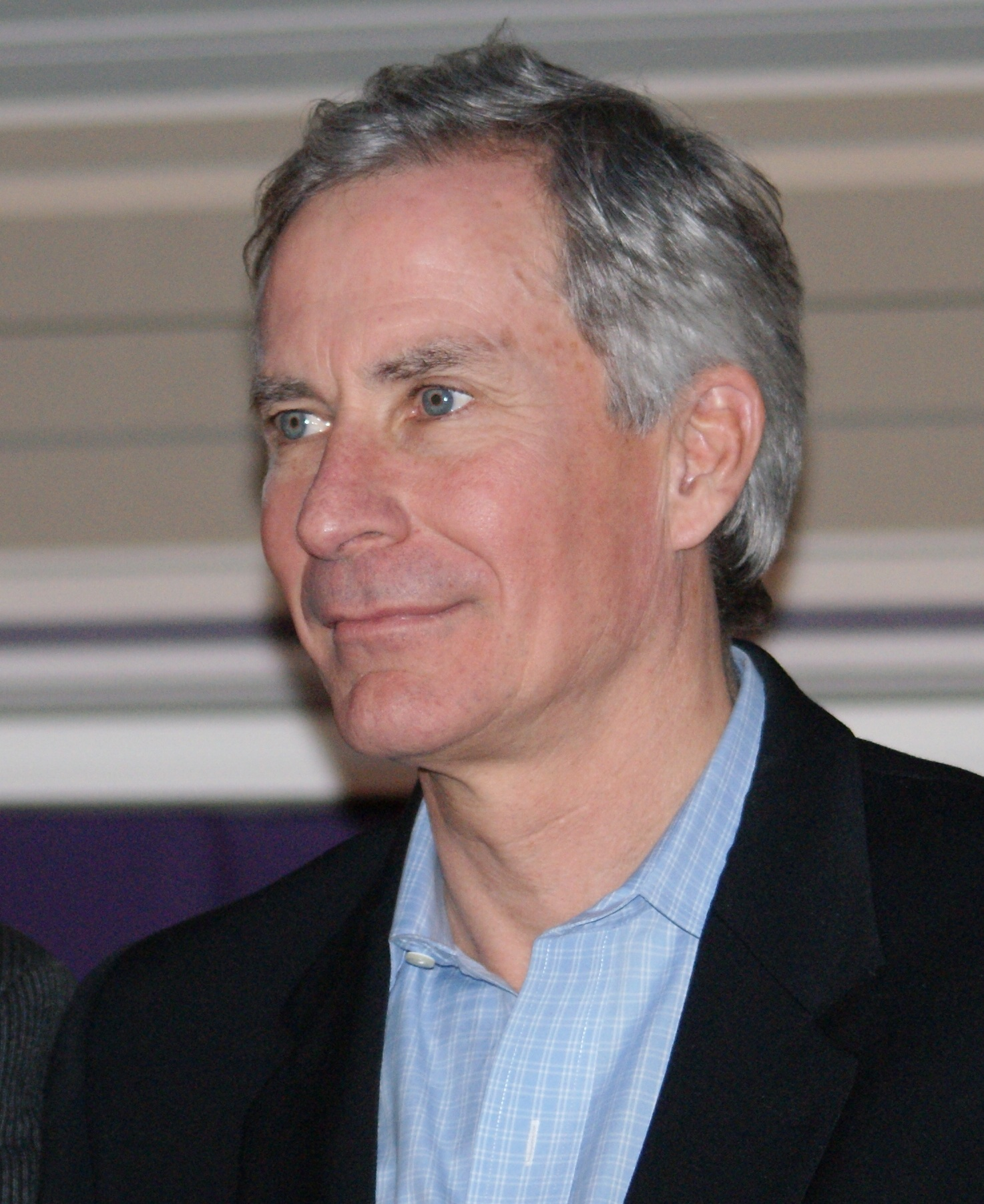
David Breashears

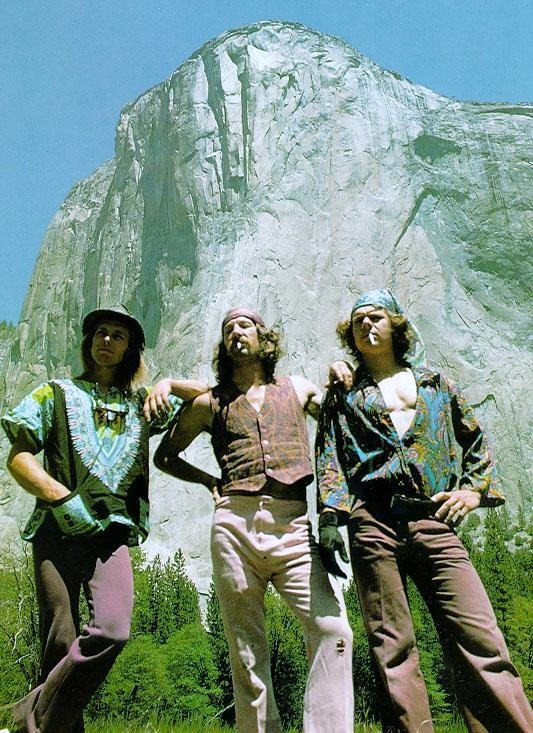
Bill Westbay, Jim Bridwell (center), and John Long

- Samina Baig (born 1990) Pakistan, third Pakistani, and the first Pakistani woman, to climb Mount Everest
- John Bachar (1957–2009) US, leading Yosemite-based rock climber and free soloist in the 1970s
- John Ball (1818–1889) Ireland, alpinist, climbing guidebook author, first president of Alpine Club (1857)
- Jacques Balmat (1762–1834) Duchy of Savoy, Chamonix-based guide, first ascent Mont Blanc (1786)
- George Band (1929–2011) UK, first ascent of Kangchenjunga on the 1955 British expedition
- Kinga Baranowska (born 1975) Poland, first Polish woman to climb Dhaulagiri, Manaslu and Kangchenjunga
- Anna Barańska (born 1976) Poland, first Polish woman to climb the North Face of Mount Everest
- Henry Barber (born 1953) US, leading US rock climber in the 1970s
- Andrzej Bargiel (born 1988) Poland, Snow Leopard record holder, several first ski mountaineering descents of eight-thousanders
- Lilliane and Maurice Barrard (1948–1986 and 1941?–1986) France, Nanga Parbat (1984, first female), both killed on K2
- Charles Barrington (1834–1901) UK, first ascent of the Eiger (1858)
- Richard Bass (1929–2015) US, businessman and amateur mountaineer, first to complete the Seven Summits (1985)
- Robert Hicks Bates (1911–2007) US, first ascent of Mount Lucania (1937), part of US attempts on K2 in 1938 and 1953
- Mark Beaufoy (1764–1827) UK, fourth ascent Mont Blanc (1787)
- Fred Beckey (Friedrich Wolfgang Beckey) (1923–2017) Germany/US, many first ascents of North American peaks
- Bentley Beetham (1886–1963) UK, member of the 1924 Everest expedition; pioneer rock climber in Borrowdale
- George Irving Bell (1926–2000) US, physicist, biologist and mountaineer, first ascent Masherbrum (1960), rescued on K2 (1953)
- Gertrude Bell (1868–1926) UK, many ascents in the Alps; the Swiss peak Gertrudspitze was named in her honor
- Maciej Berbeka (1954–2013) Poland, first winter ascents of 3 eight-thousanders: Manaslu, Cho Oyu, and Broad Peak
- Josune Bereziartu (born 1972) Basque (Spain), first female to climb grade 8c (5.14b), 8c+ (5.14c), and 9a (5.14d)
- Patrick Berhault (1957–2004) France, several first free ascents of major sport climbing and alpine climbing routes
- Didier Berthod (born 1981) Switzerland, leading traditional climber who quit after failing on Cobra Crack 5.14a (8b+)
- Adam Bielecki (born 1983) Poland, first winter ascents of 2 eight-thousanders: Gasherbrum I and Broad Peak
- John Biggar (born 1964) Scotland, several first ascents in the Andes
- Isabella Bird (1831–1904) UK, traveler, writer, and natural historian; first female fellow of the Royal Geographical Society
- Barry Blanchard (born 1959) Canada, mountain guide; first ascents in the Saint Elias range of Alaska
- Smoke Blanchard (1915–1989) US, developed The Buttermilks bouldering area in Bishop, California
- Karl Blodig (1859–1956) Austria, mountaineer, optician and journalist; first to climb all 4,000 metre peaks in the Alps
- Arlene Blum (born 1945) US, part of the first US female attempt on Everest, led the first all-woman ascent of Annapurna
- Peter Boardman (1950–1982) UK, Everest 1975, Changabang 1976, Kanchenjunga 1979, died on Everest with Joe Tasker
- Emmanuel Boileau de Castelnau (1857–1923) France, first ascent La Meije with father and son Pierre Gaspard (1877)
- Jean-Marc Boivin (1951–1990) France, first ascents of extreme alpine routes, pioneer of extreme skiing and BASE jumping
- Walter Bonatti (1930–2011) Italy, mountaineer and writer, solo new routes on Aiguille du Dru and Matterhorn
- Sir Chris Bonington (born 1934) UK, first ascent of Freney Pillar (1961), Tower of Paine (1962–3); ascent of 3 eight-thousanders
- Thomas George Bonney (1833–1923) UK, geologist and mountaineer, president of the Alpine Club
- Jack Borgenicht (1911–2005) US, garment manufacturer, philanthropist, the oldest person to climb Mount Rainier at age 81
- William Bosi (born 1998) UK, first person to repeat Burden of Dreams (climb), achieved many notable ascents at the boulder grade 9A
- Alastair Borthwick (1913–2003) Scotland, climber and author of Always a Little Further
- Christine Boskoff (1967–2006) US, 6 eight-thousanders, including Everest twice, died on Genyen Peak
- Sébastien Bouin (born 1993) France, first ascent of DNA (2022), the world's second-ever 9c (5.15d) route
- Anatoli Boukreev (1958–1997) Russia, 7 eight-thousanders without oxygen, part of 1996 Everest disaster, died on Annapurna
- Loulou Boulaz (1908–1991) Switzerland, several first ascents and first female ascents in the Alps
- Tom Bourdillon (1924–1956) UK, Cho Oyu (1952), part of 1953 British Everest expedition, first to Everest South Summit (1953)
- Stipe Božić (born 1951) FPR Yugoslavia, completed the Seven Summits, second European to climb Everest twice
- Lydia Bradey (born 1961) New Zealand, first woman to climb Everest without supplementary oxygen 1988
- Samuel Brawand (1898–2001) Switzerland, politician, and mountain guide; first ascent of Mittellegigrat (1921)
- David Breashears (born 1956) US, Everest twice, directed IMAX film Everest
- Meta Brevoort (1825–1876) US, alpinist of Victorian period, aunt of W. A. B. Coolidge
- Russell Brice (born 1952) New Zealand, set record for fastest solo ascent without oxygen of Cho Oyu and Ama Dablam
- Jim Bridwell (1944–2018) US, first ascents of major aid routes on El Capitan; first one-day ascent of The Nose (1975)
- David Brower (1912–2000) US, executive director of Sierra Club and Yosemite climber
- Joe Brown (1930–2020) UK, first ascent of Cenotaph Corner, the Aiguille de Blaitière west face, and Kanchenjunga (1955)
- Katie Brown (born 1981) US, pioneer female competition climber and big wall climber
- Adriana Brownlee (born 2001) UK, youngest woman to climb all 14 eight-thousanders.
- Geoffrey Bruce (1896–1972) UK, first to reach 8,300 metres (27,300 ft) on Mount Everest (1922).
- Hermann Buhl (1924–1957) Austria, first ascent Nanga Parbat (1953) and of Broad Peak (1957), died on Chogolisa
- Alexander Burgener (1845–1910) Switzerland, first ascent Zmuttgrat, Grands Charmoz, Aiguille du Grépon, Lenzspitze, and Grand Dru
- Jean Buridan (c. 1300–1358) France, climbed Mont Ventoux for the view, before Petrarch

== C ==
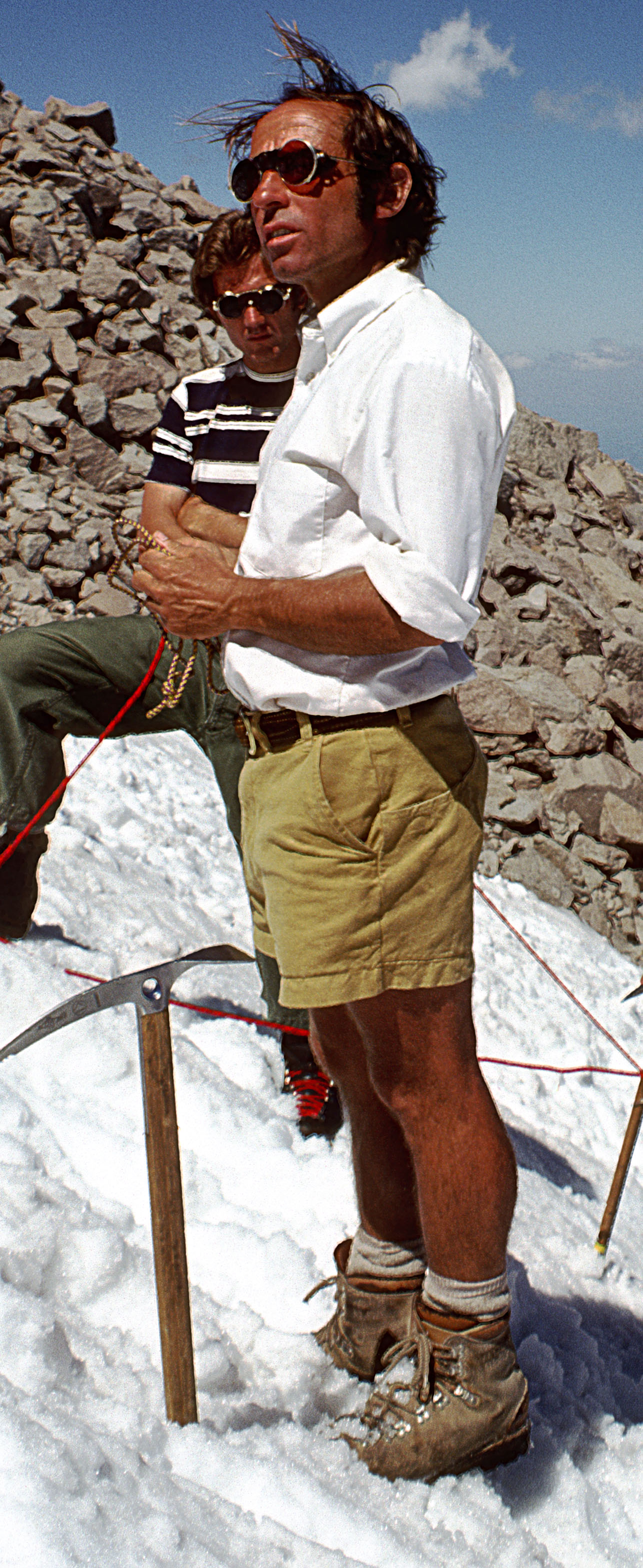
Yvon Chouinard

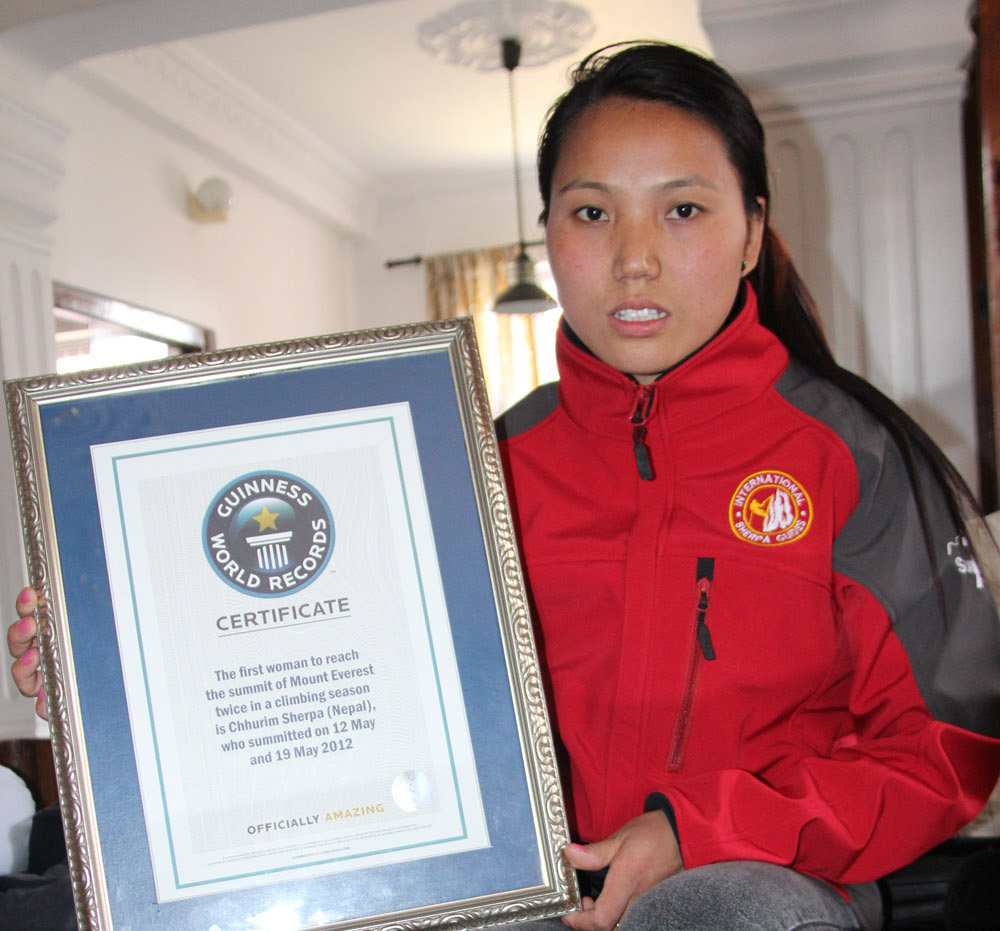
Chhurim

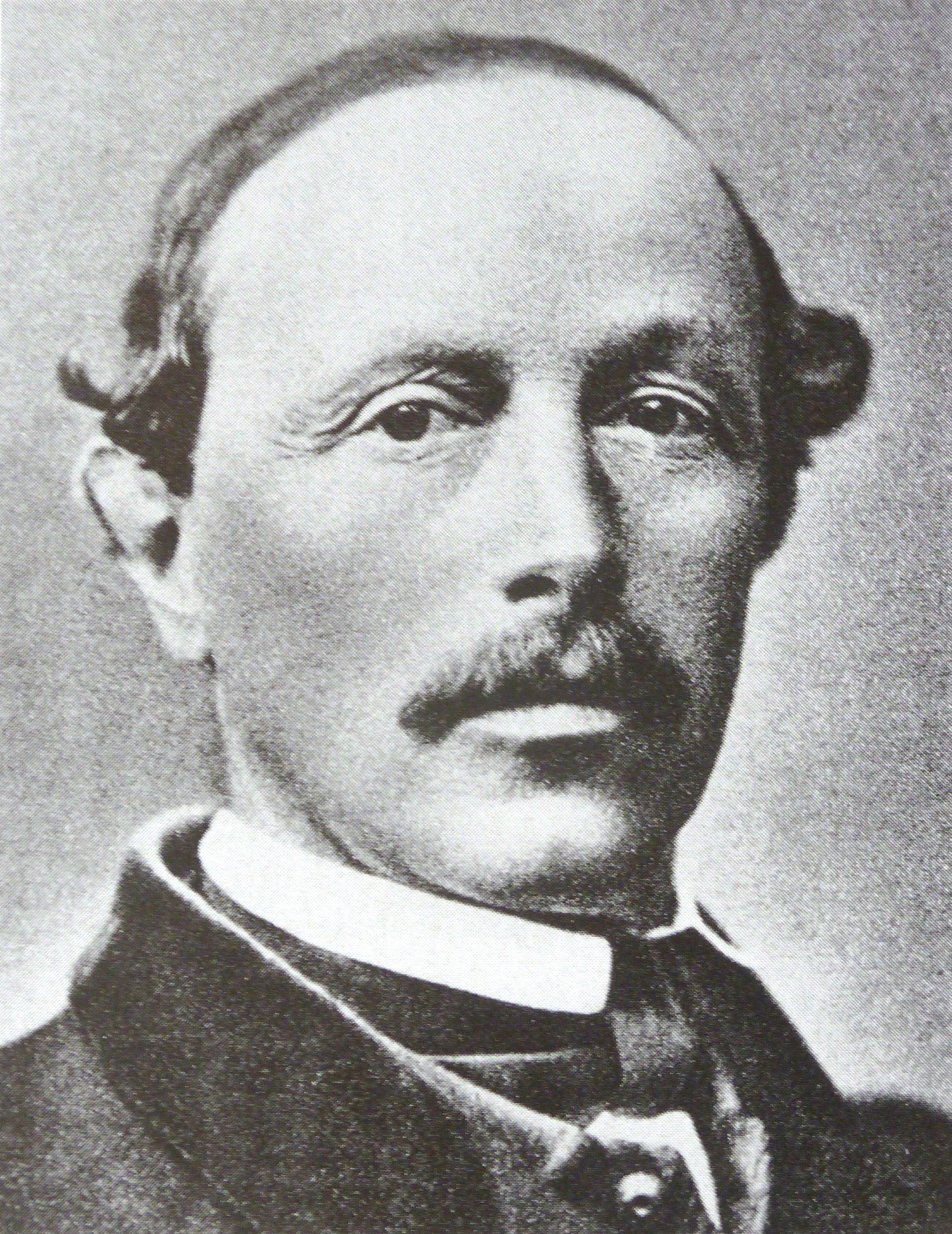
Johann Coaz

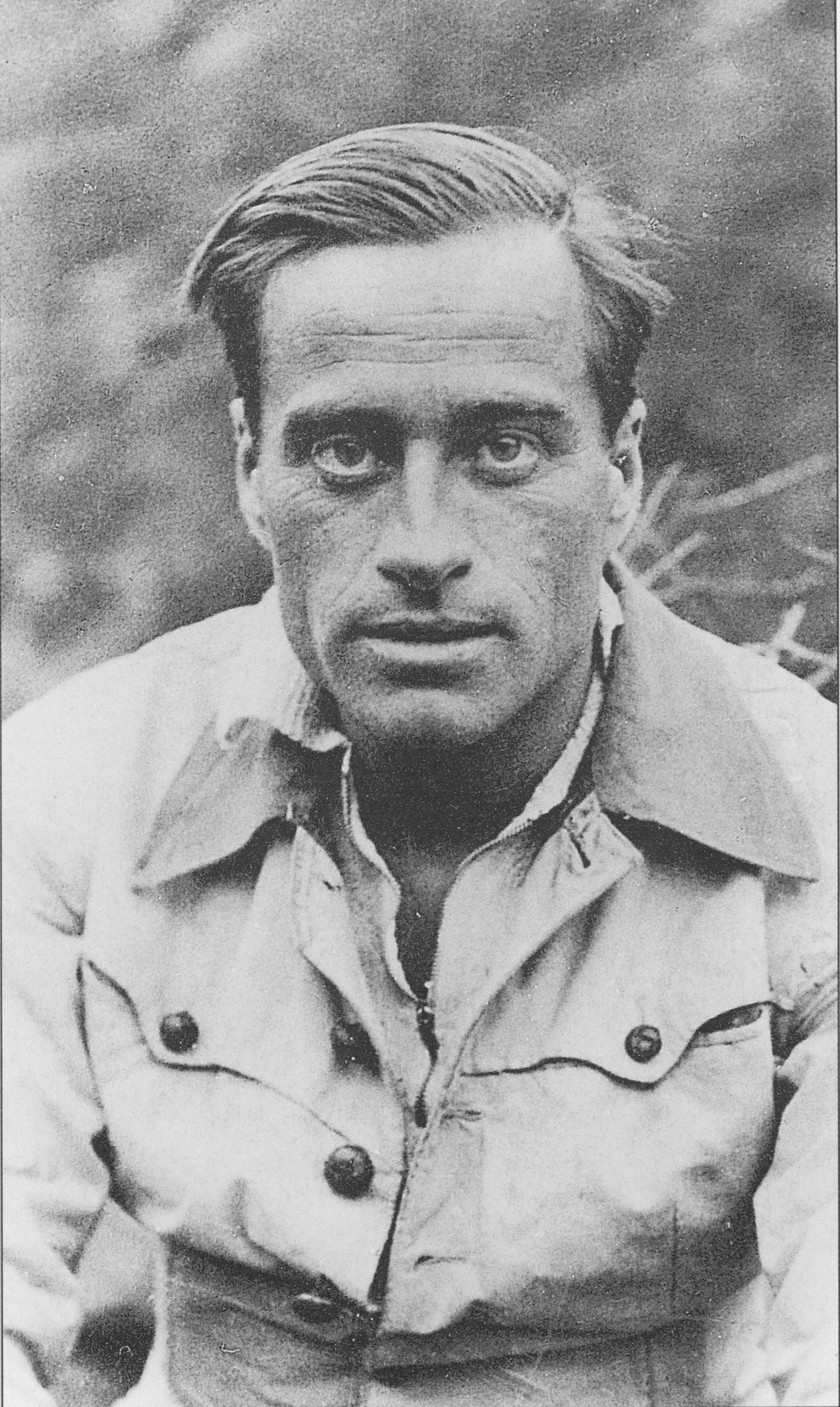
Emilio Comici

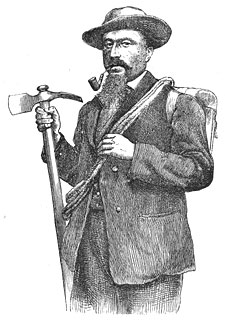
Michel Croz

- Tommy Caldwell (born 1978) US, first free ascents of big wall routes on El Capitan, including Dawn Wall, first at 9a (5.14d)
- Una Cameron (1904–1987) UK, ascents in the Alps, Caucasus, and Africa
- Louis Ramond de Carbonnières (1755–1827) France, scientist and Pyrenean pioneer
- Kim Carrigan (born 1958) Australia, first ascents of the first Ewbank grade 26, 27, 28, 29 and 30, routes.
- Carlos Carsolio (born 1962) Mexico, the fourth person to summit all 14 eight-thousanders (1985–1996)
- Riccardo Cassin (1909–2009) Italy, equipment manufacturer and pioneer alpinist; first ascent of the north face of Piz Badile (1937), and the north face of the Grandes Jorasses (Walker Spur, 1938)
- Cristina Castagna (1977–2009) Italy, first Italian female ascent of Makalu, ascent of several other eight-thousanders
- Alison Chadwick-Onyszkiewicz (1942–1978) Britain, first ascent of Gasherbrum III
- Ludwik Chałubiński (1860–1933) Poland, first ascent of Mięguszowiecki Szczyt Wielki
- Armand Charlet (1900–1975) France, many first ascents in the Mont Blanc massif
- Isabella Charlet-Straton (1838–1918) UK, first ascents in Alps, first winter ascent of Mont Blanc (1876)
- Maxime Chaya (born 1961) Lebanon, climbed Everest (2006), Seven Summits and Three Poles Challenge
- Chhurim (born 1984) Nepal, the first woman to summit Everest twice in a week
- Chang Yuan-Chih (1988 – 2024), Taiwanese first ascentionist, second from Taiwan to climb an eight-thousander
- Renata Chlumska (born 1973) Sweden, first Swedish female ascent of Everest (1999)
- Yvon Chouinard (born 1938) US, pioneer of big wall and aid climbing in Yosemite, founder of Chouinard Equipment and Patagonia
- Leszek Cichy (born 1951) Poland, first winter ascent of Everest with Krzysztof Wielicki
- John Clarke (1945–2003) Ireland-Canada, explorer with over 600 first ascents in Coast Range of British Columbia
- Vern Clevenger (born 1955) US, first ascent Cholatse (1982), numerous first routes ascents in Sierra Nevada
- Ian Clough (1939–1970) UK, first ascent Am Buachaille (1968), first UK ascent Eiger north face (1962), died on Annapurna
- Norman Clyde (1886–1972) US, pioneer of California's Sierra Nevada
- Johann Coaz (1822–1918) Switzerland, first ascent of Piz Bernina
- J. Norman Collie (1859–1942) UK, first ascent Ben Nevis Tower Ridge, Nanga Parbat expedition (1895)
- Emilio Comici (1901–1940) Italy, pioneer of big wall climbing and aid climbing; first ascent Cima Grande north face (1933)
- Achille Compagnoni (1914–2009) Italy, first ascent of K2 with Lino Lacedelli on the 1954 Italian Karakoram expedition to K2
- Kyra Condie (born 1996) US, member of the 2020 US Olympic climbing team
- Herb and Jan Conn (Herb: 1921–2012) US, early pioneers of climbing and caving in Carderock, Seneca Rocks, and the Black Hills
- William Martin Conway (1856–1937) UK, surveyor and explorer (Karakoram, Spitsbergen, Andes & Alps)
- Kenton Cool (born 1973) UK, several eight-thousanders (Everest over seventeen times); ski descents of Cho Oyu and Manaslu
- W. A. B. Coolidge (1850–1926) US, over 1,700 expeditions in the Alps with numerous first ascents, Alpine historian
- Janne Corax (born 1967) Sweden, cycled across the Tibetan plateau and claimed several first ascents of Tibetan mountains
- Henri Cordier (1856–1877) France, first ascents Aiguille du Plat de la Selle, Les Droites (east summit) (1876)
- Patrick Cordier (1947–1996) France, first and solo ascents in the Alps; French Direct Troll Wall (1967) and The Nose solo (1973)
- Jean Couzy (1923–1958) France, first ascent of Makalu with Terray on the 1955 French Makalu expedition
- Lucy Creamer (born 1971) UK, early British female competition climber, and alpine and ice climber.
- Peter Croft (born 1958) Canada, free soloing pioneer (Astroman, Rostrum); many first ascents in the Sierra Nevada
- Aleister Crowley (1875–1947) UK, occultist, writer, and rock climber, led early expeditions on K2 and on Kanchenjunga
- Michel Croz (1830–1865) France, mountain guide with numerous first ascents, died on the first ascent of the Matterhorn
- John Cunningham (1927–1980) Scotland, pioneered new climbing techniques in ice climbing
- Bronisław Czech (1908–1944) Poland, a mountain rescue pioneer in the Tatra Mountains
- Anna Czerwińska (born 1949) Poland, first woman over age 50 to ascend Everest, first Polish female to climb Seven Summits
- Andrzej Czok (1948–1986) Poland, first winter ascent of Dhaulagiri, and first ascent of Everest via the South Pillar

== D ==
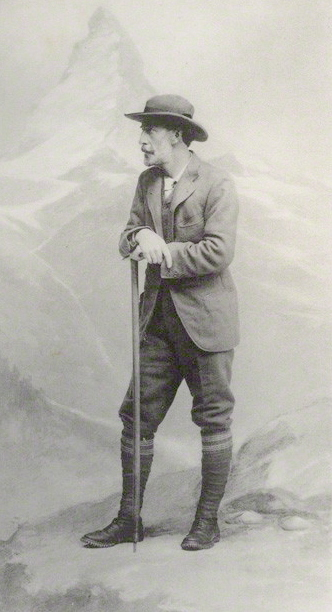
Clinton Thomas Dent

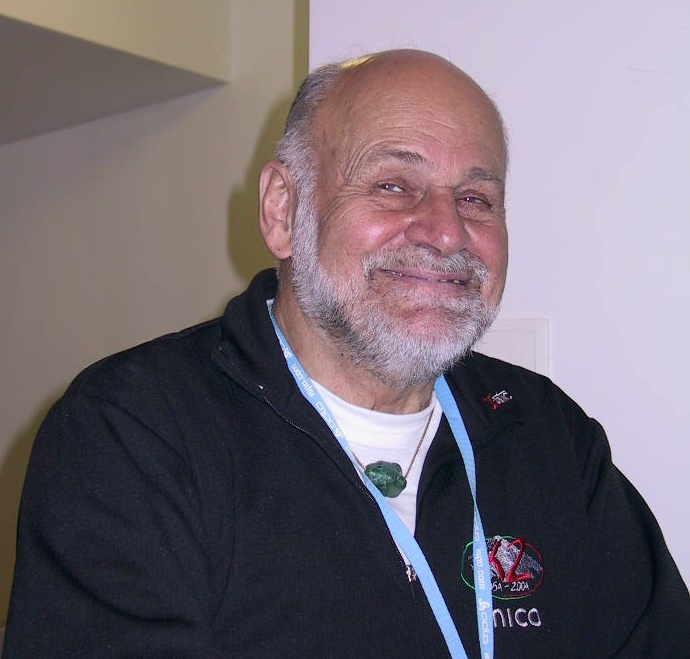
Kurt Diemberger

- Kalpana Dash (born 1966) India, first from Odisha, India to climb Everest (2008)
- Sophia Danenberg (born 1972) US, first African American and first black woman to ascend Everest (2006)
- Steph Davis (born 1973) US, second female one-day free climb El Capitan and first female to free climb the Salathé Wall (2005)
- Johnny Dawes (born 1964) UK, the first free ascent of E9 (Indian Face, 1986), and E8 (Gaia, 1985) traditional climbing routes
- José Antonio Delgado (1965–2006) Venezuela, five eight-thousanders (1994–2006), died on Nanga Parbat
- Clinton Thomas Dent (1850–1912) UK, first ascent Lenzspitze (1870), Aiguille du Dru (1878); expeditions to the Caucasus
- Ardito Desio (1897–2001) Italy, geologist and leader of successful 1954 Italian Karakoram expedition to K2
- Catherine Destivelle (born 1960) France, first female to climb 8a+ (5.13c), first female to winter solo of the "north face trilogy"
- Kurt Diemberger (born 1932) Austria, first ascent of Broad Peak (1957) and Dhaulagiri (1960), climbed K2 (1986 K2 disaster)
- Sasha DiGiulian (born 1992) US, the first female to free climb Magic Mushroom 7c+ (5.13a) on the Eiger north face
- Jan Długosz (1929–1962) Poland, numerous alpine ascents in the Tatras and Alps; first ascent of the Central Pillar of Frêney
- Sarah Doherty (1959–2023) US, the first amputee to reach the summit of Denali without a prosthetic limb
- Jim Donini (born 1943) US, first ascent of Torre Egger (1976), president of the American Alpine Club (2006–2009)
- Hans Christian Doseth (1958–1984) Norway, first ascent of the East Face of Great Trango Tower (1984), died during the descent
- Lord Francis Douglas (1847–1865) Scotland, died on the descent after the first ascent of the Matterhorn (1965)
- Lonnie Dupre (born 1961) US, Arctic explorer, made a rare solo winter ascent of Denali
- Hans Dülfer (1892–1915) Germany, pioneer free climber, inventor of the Dülfersitz abseil technique; killed in World War I
- Hayatullah Khan Durrani (born 1962) Pakistan, mountaineer, and rock climber
- Günther Dyhrenfurth (1886–1975) German/Swiss, Himalayan explorer, led German expeditions to Kanchenjunga (1930, 1931)

== E ==
- James Eccles (1838–1915) UK, first ascents in the Mont Blanc massif
- Oscar Eckenstein (1859–1921) UK, alpinist, rock climber, and pioneer of bouldering; inventor of modern crampon
- Patrick Edlinger (1960–2012) France, first person to onsight 7c (5.12d), and second-ever person to redpoint 7c+ (5.13a); prolific free soloist
- Toni Egger (1926-1959) Austria, first ascent of Jirishanca. Died whilst descending Cerro Torre.
- Angela Eiter (born 1986) Austria, first female to redpoint – and to make an FFA – at 9b (5.15b); successful competition climber
- Albert R. Ellingwood (22 June 1887 – 12 May 1934) pioneer of climbing peaks in the Rocky Mountains and Colorado in particular
- Zsolt Erőss (1968–2013) Hungary, ten eight-thousanders, two with a prosthetic leg, died on descent from Kangchenjunga
- Susan Ershler (born 1956) US, climbed Seven Summits
- Leila Esfandyari (1970–2011) Iran, first Iranian woman to climb Nanga Parbat; died on Gasherbrum II
- Jens Esmark (1763–1839) Norway, first ascent Snøhetta (1798) and Gaustatoppen, led first expedition to Bitihorn
- Nick Estcourt (1942–1978) UK, alpinist; killed on K2 by avalanche on the 1970 British Annapurna South Face expedition
- Charles Evans (1918–1995) UK, deputy leader of 1953 British Mount Everest expedition, and leader of 1955 British Kangchenjunga expedition
- John Ewbank (1948–2013) Australia, pioneer of Australian rock climbing, invented Ewbank grading system

== F ==
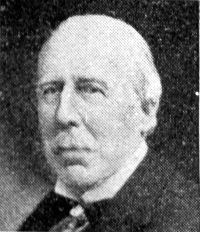
Douglas Freshfield

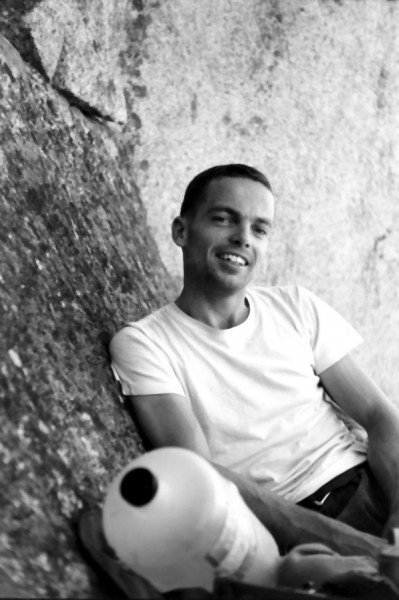
Tom Frost

- Freda du Faur (1882–1935) Australia, first female ascent of Aoraki / Mount Cook
- Ron Fawcett (born 1955) UK, pioneer professional rock climber, first ascent of Master's Edge E7 6c
- Sue Fear (1963–2006) Australia, five eight-thousanders, killed in crevasse fall on Manaslu
- Rudolf Fehrmann (1886–1947) Germany, pioneer rock climber in the Elbe Sandstone Mountains
- Darby Field (1610–1649) UK, first European to climb Mount Washington (New Hampshire) (1642)
- George Ingle Finch (1888–1970) Australia, reached 8,300 m on 1922 British Everest expedition; north face of Dent d'Hérens
- Hazel Findlay (born 1989) UK, first British female to ascend a traditional climbing route at grade E9
- Scott Fischer (1955–1996) US, ascents of Lhotse (1990), K2 (1992), Everest (1994); died in 1996 Mount Everest disaster
- Hans Florine (born 1964) US, won first world speed championships in 1991, set a speed record on The Nose of 2:36:45 (2012)
- James David Forbes (1809–1868) UK, first British ascent of the Jungfrau
- Charlie Fowler (1954–2006) US, free soloist and high-altitude mountaineer
- Mick Fowler (born 1956) UK, leading traditional climber, ice climber and alpinist; winner of three Piolet d'Ors (2003, 2013, 2016)
- Douglas Freshfield (1845–1934) UK, ascents in the Alps, Scotland, Himalayas, and Pyrenees; president of Alpine Club
- Tom Frost US, first ascents of big wall routes on El Capitan including Salathé Wall (1961) and North American Wall (1964)
- Fritiof Fryxell (1900–1986) US, geologist, and park ranger, first ascents in the Teton Range
- Wang Fuzhou (1935–2015) China, first ascent of the north face of Everest, first ascent of Shishapangma

== G ==
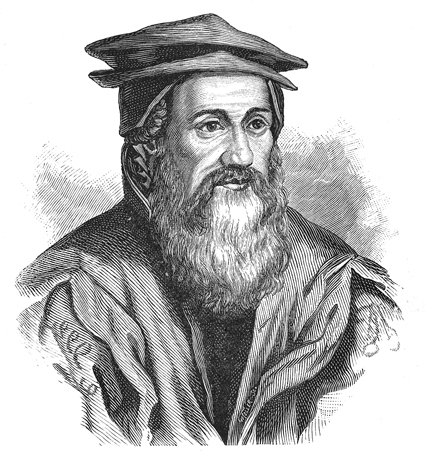
Conrad Gessner

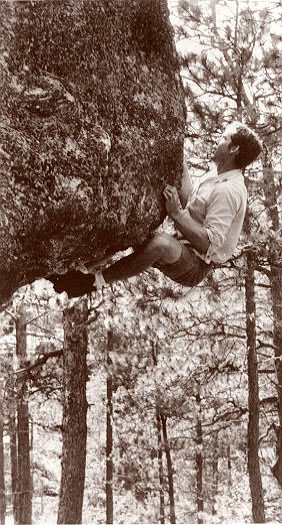
John Gill

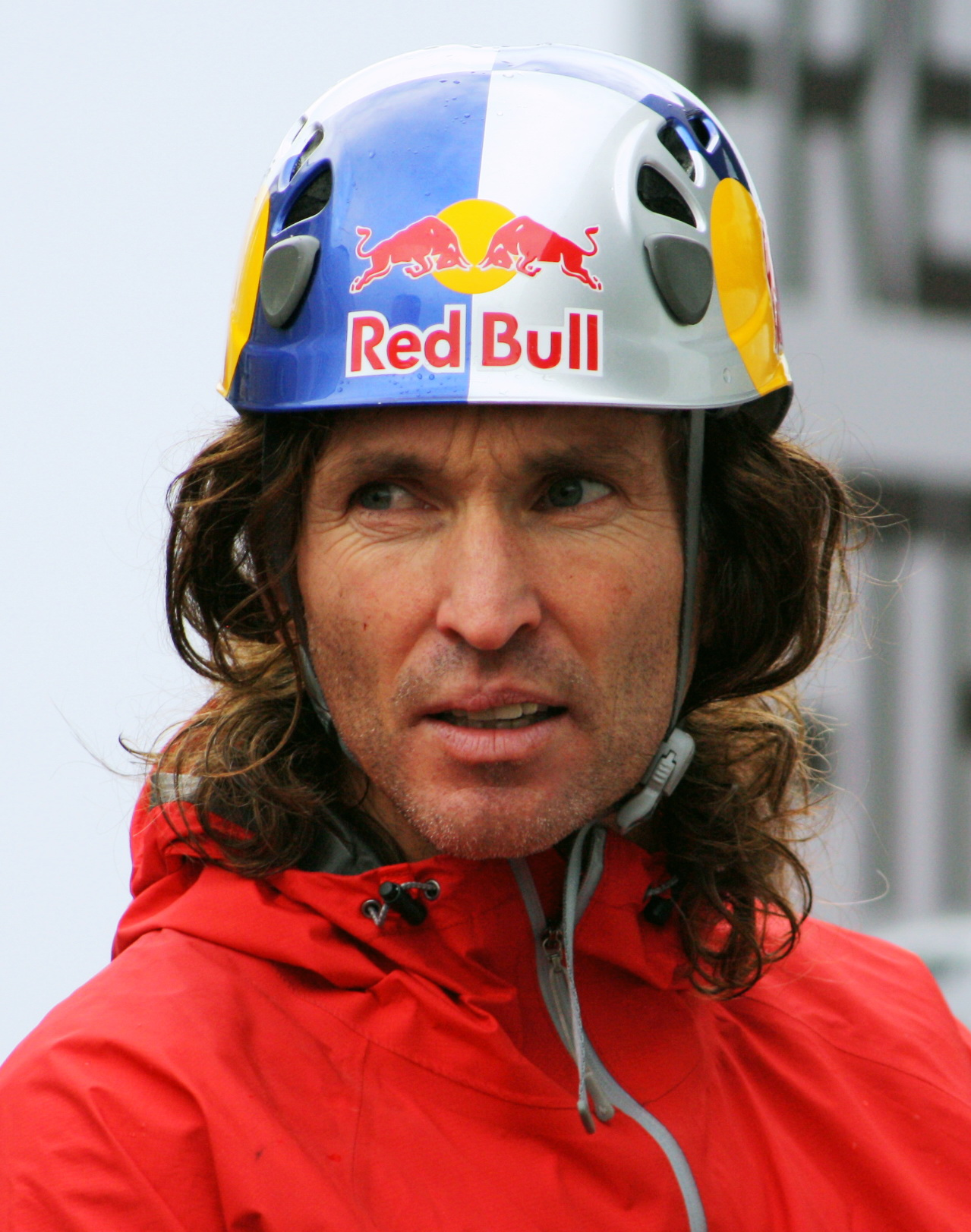
Stefan Glowacz

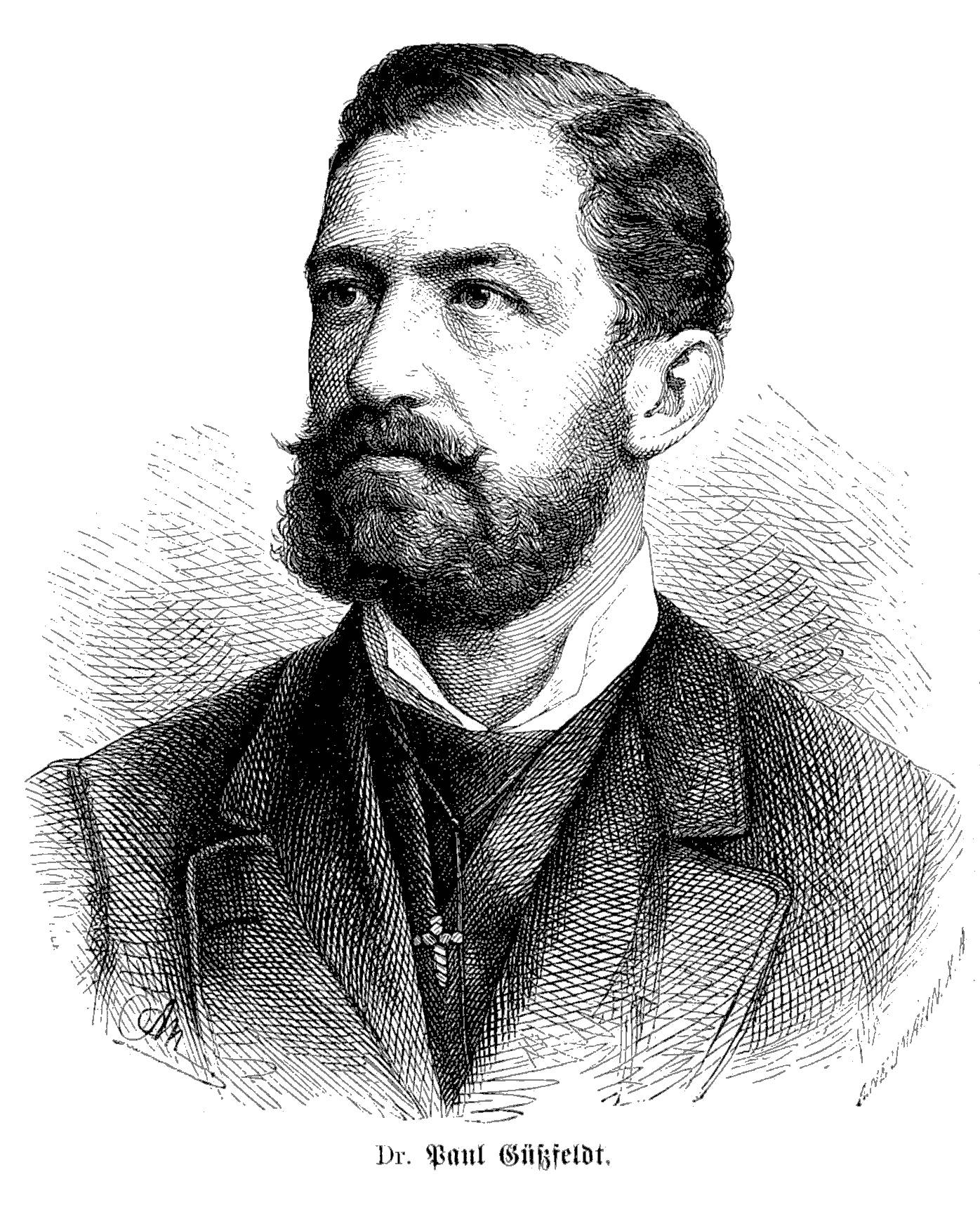
Paul Güssfeldt

- Patrick Gabarrou (born 1951) France, first ascents of extreme alpine routes in Mont Blanc massif (Hypercouloir, Supercouloir)
- Will Gadd (born 1967) Canada, pioneer mixed climber (first M9 and M12), and pioneer of Helmcken extreme ice routes
- Ryszard Gajewski (born 1954) Poland, first winter ascent of Manaslu
- Lene Gammelgaard Denmark, part of the 1996 Mount Everest disaster; first Scandinavian female ascent of Everest
- João Garcia (born 1967) Portugal, 10th person to climb all 14 eight-thousanders without oxygen (1993–2010)
- Rolando Garibotti (born 1971) Argentina/US, first ascents on Fitz Roy and Cerro Torre including the Torre Traverse (2008)
- Janja Garnbret (born 1999) Slovenia, the most successful competition climber in history; first female to onsight 8c (5.14b)
- Pierre Gaspard (1834–1915) France, first ascent La Meije with his son and Emmanuel Boileau de Castelnau
- Chanda Gayen (1979–2014) India, the first woman from West Bengal to climb Everest; killed on Kanchenjunga
- Lakpa Gelu (born 1967) Nepal, mountain guide who summitted Everest over 12 times; set one-day speed records on Everest
- Lester Germer (1896–1971) US, physicist, World War I fighter pilot and prominent rock climber in the Gunks
- Conrad Gessner (1516–1565) Switzerland, naturalist and early mountaineer in the Alps
- Azim Gheychisaz (born 1981) Iran, 18th person to climb all 14 eight-thousanders without oxygen (2008–2017)
- Eric Gilbertson (born 1986), US, professor known for several FKTs, first ascent of Alpomish, and surveying the heights of several mountains
- John Gill (born 1937) US, "father" of modern bouldering, and first to climb 7B (V8) and 7C (V9); introduced chalk to climbing
- Stefan Glowacz (born 1965) Germany, second-ever onsight at 8b (5.13d), and second-ever 8b+ (5.14a) multi-pitch ascent
- Alessandro Gogna (born 1946) Italy, several first winter (and solo) ascents of major Alpine north faces
- Dan Goodwin (born 1955) US, known for buildering (World Trade Center, Sears Tower, John Hancock Center and CN Tower)
- Alec and Peter Graham, New Zealand mountaineers, mountain guides and hotel operators
- Dave Graham (born 1981) US, leading boulderer of his generation, first ascent of The Story of Two Worlds V15 (8C)
- Tormod Granheim (born 1974) Norway, first ski mountaineering descent the north face of Everest (2006)
- Chloé Graftiaux (1987–2010) Belgium, rock climber (sport and bouldering) and alpinist; bronze in 2010 World Cup for bouldering
- William Spotswood Green (1847–1919) New Zealand, ascents in the Selkirks, and Mount Green is named in his honor
- Paul Grohmann (1838–1908) Austria, numerous first ascents in the Eastern Alps in the 19th century
- Michael Groom (born 1959) Australia, ascents of Lhotse, Kangchenjunga, K2, and Everest without bottled oxygen
- Bear Grylls (born 1974) in 1998, youngest Briton to summit Everest (age 23)
- Wolfgang Güllich (1960–1992) Germany, first to redpoint grade 8b (5.13d), 8b+ (5.14a), 8c (5.14b), and 9a (5.14d); first to free solo at 7c (5.12d) (and to free solo Separate Reality); co-inventor of the campus board
- Paul Güssfeldt (1840–1920) Germany, first ascent Peuterey ridge and Piz Scerscen, first European attempt on Aconcagua (1883)
- Veikka Gustafsson (born 1968) Finland, 9th person to climb all 14 eight-thousanders without oxygen (1993–2009)

== H ==
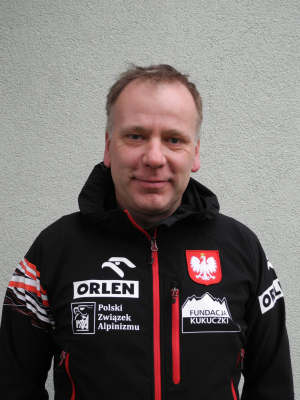
Artur Hajzer

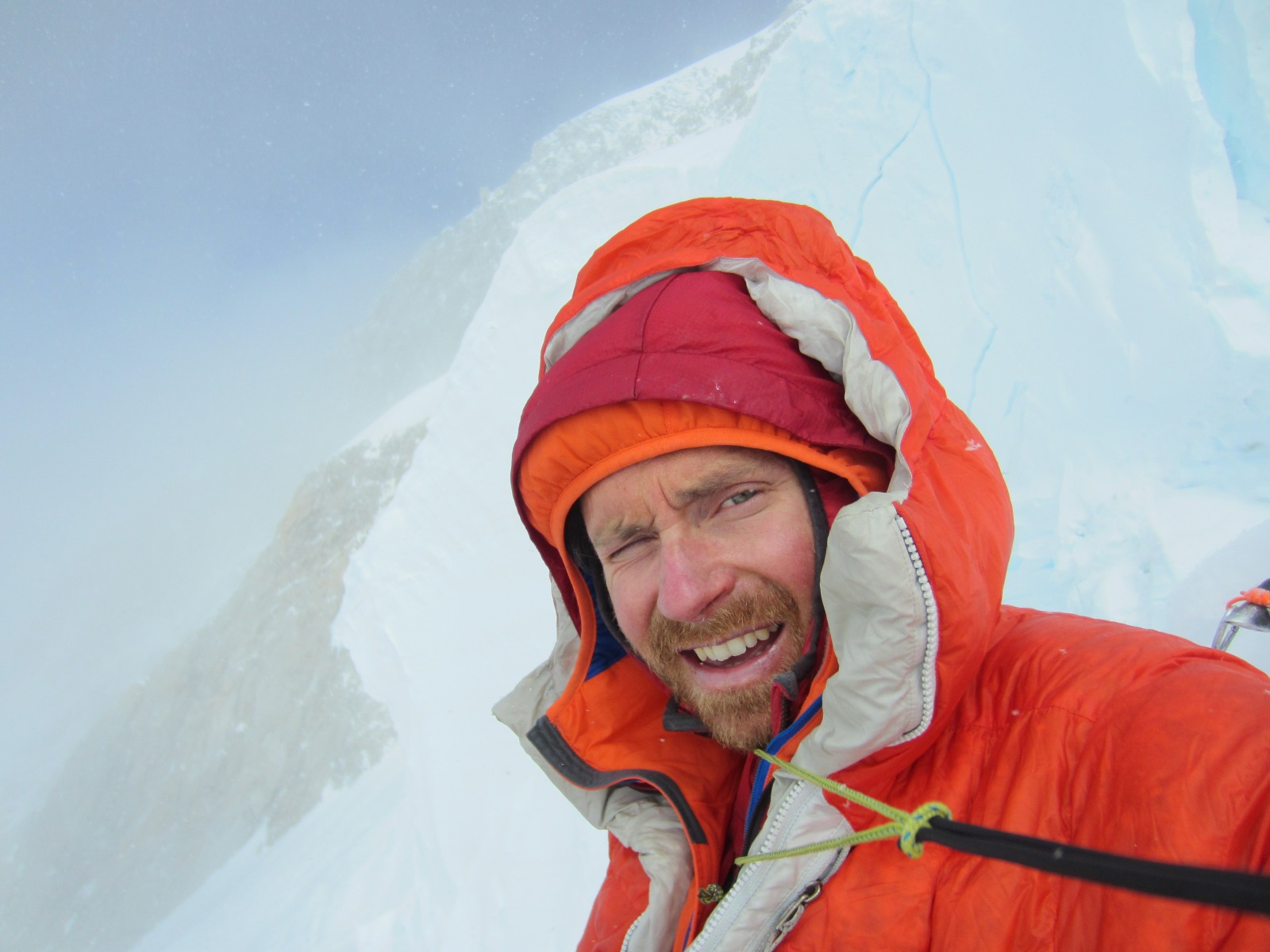
Colin Haley

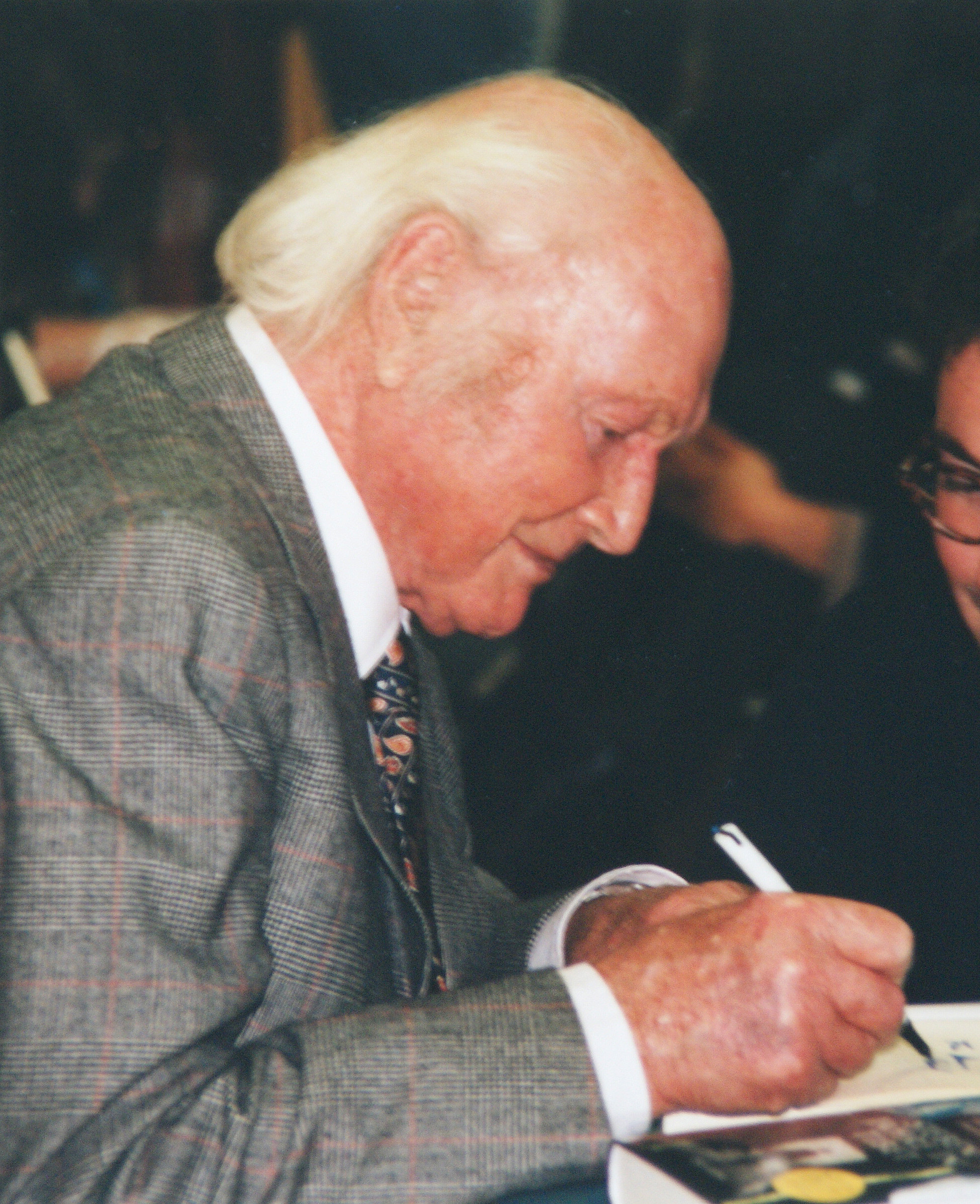
Heinrich Harrer

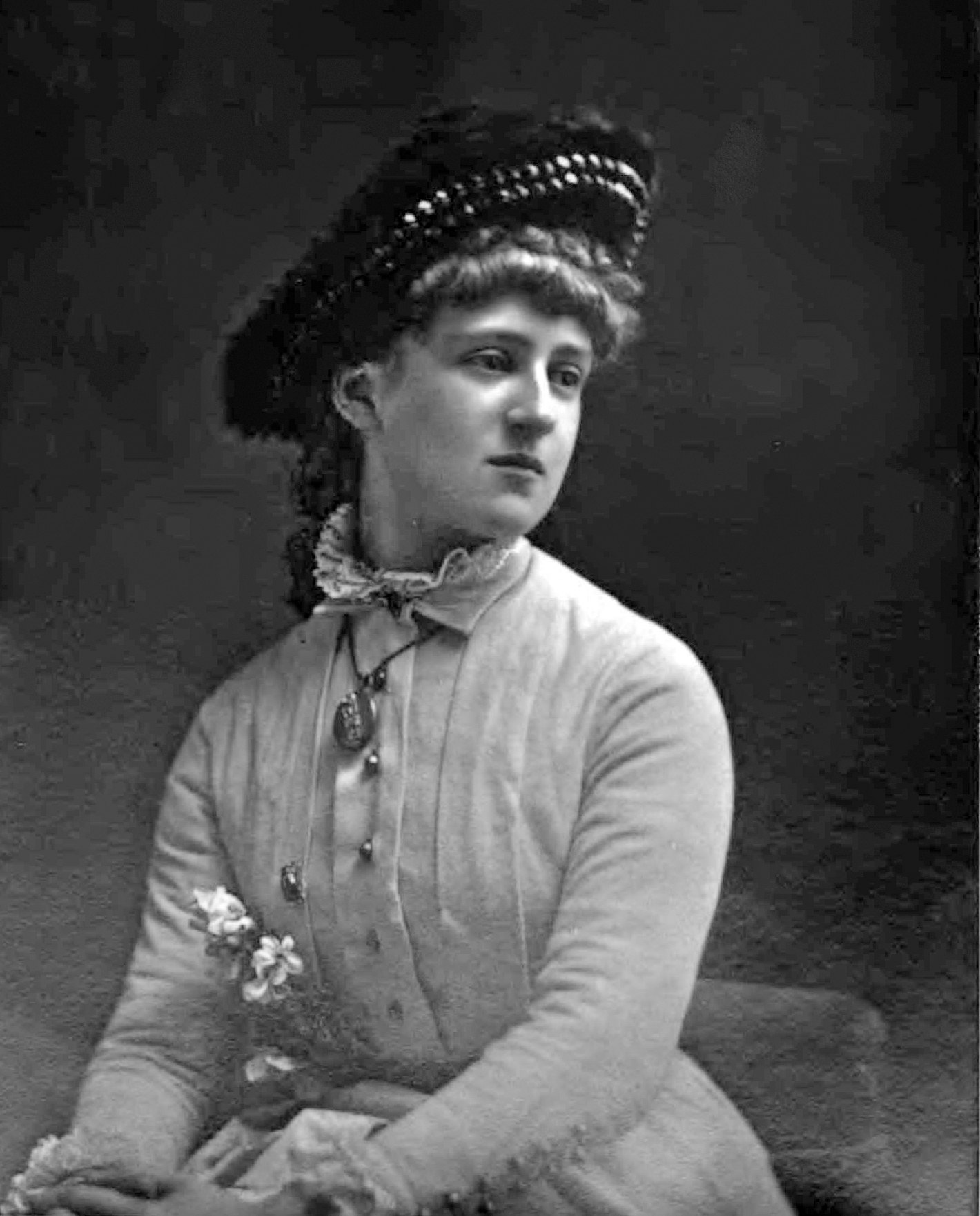
Elizabeth Hawkins-Whitshed

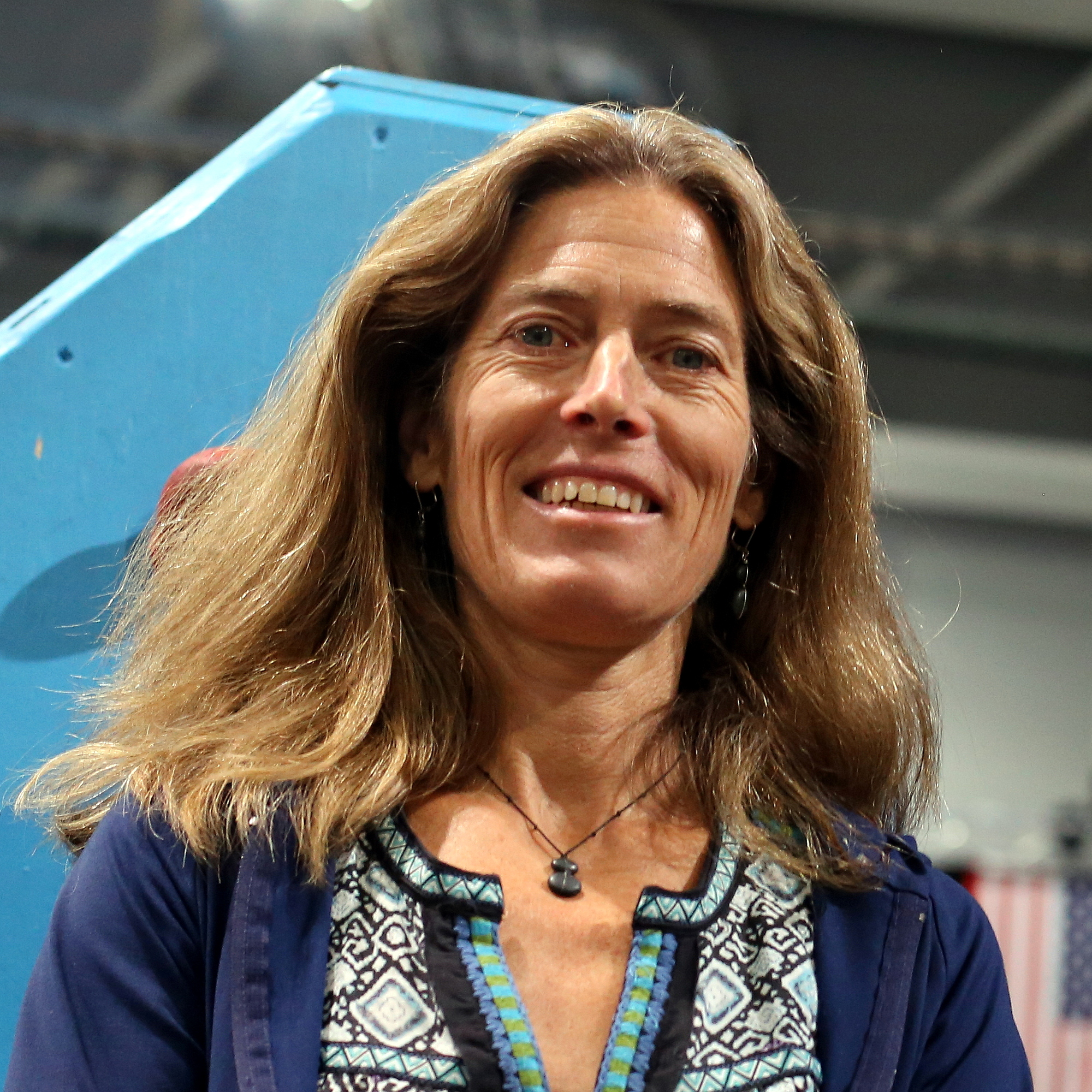
Lynn Hill

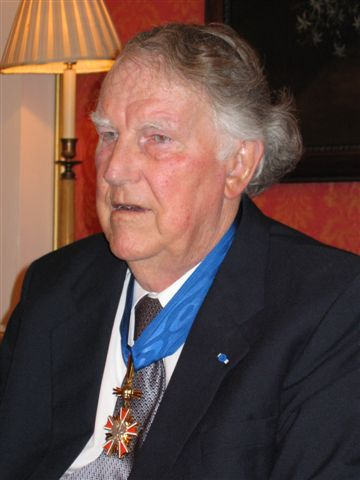
Edmund Hillary

- Peter Habeler (born 1942) Austria, first ascent without supplementary oxygen Everest (1978) with Reinhold Messner
- Douglas Robert Hadow (1846–1865) UK, died on first ascent Matterhorn (1865)
- Dave Hahn (born 1961) US, 11 Everest ascents, 26 Vinson Massif ascents, 19 Denali ascents
- Christoph Hainz (born 1962), South Tyrol, Italy, allrounder mountaineer, 40 first ascents
- Artur Hajzer (1962–2013) Poland, first winter ascent of Annapurna with Jerzy Kukuczka (1987)
- Colin Haley (born 1984) US, traverses and speed solo ascents in Patagonia and the Alaska Range
- Lincoln Hall (1956–2012) Australia, rescued at 8,700m on descent from Everest (2006)
- Rob Hall (1960–1996) New Zealand, Seven Summits in seven months, died in 1996 Mount Everest disaster
- Peter Harding (1924–2007) UK, leading British traditional climbing pioneer of the 1940s
- Warren J. Harding (1924–2002) US, first ascents of big wall aid climbing routes on El Capitan, first ascent The Nose (1958)
- Alison Hargreaves (1963–1995) UK, first solo of the 6 great north faces in one season; first female solo of Everest (1995)
- John Harlin (1934–1966) US, leading American alpinist of the 1960s, killed creating the Harlin Route on the Eiger north face
- Heinrich Harrer (1912–2006) Austria, first ascent of the Eiger north face (1938), and the Carstensz Pyramid (1962), author of The White Spider (1959) and Seven Years in Tibet (1952)
- Brette Harrington (born 1992) US, first free solo of big wall route, Chiaro di Luna, in Patagonia; partner of Marc-André Leclerc
- Ginette Harrison (1958–1999) UK, Seven Summits, first female ascent Kangchenjunga (1998), killed on Dhaulagiri
- Dougal Haston (1940–1977) Scotland, first ascent Annapurna south face (1970), killed in avalanche near Leysin
- Elizabeth Hawkins-Whitshed (1860–1934) UK, pioneer of mountaineering, mountain photographer, author
- Margo Hayes (born 1998) US, first female to climb 5.15a (9a+); first female to complete the "9a+ trilogy"
- Andreas Heckmair (1906–2005) Germany, first ascent of the Eiger north face (known as the 1938 Heckmair Route)
- Zygmunt Andrzej Heinrich (1937–1989) Poland, several first ascents of new routes (and some in winter) on eight-thousanders
- Gary Hemming (1934–1969) US, first ascent south face Aiguille du Fou
- Siegfried Herford (1891–1916) UK, first ascent Scafell Central Buttress (1914)
- Derek Hersey (1956–1993) UK, prominent free soloist in Britain and America; died unroped on the Steck-Salathé Route
- Maurice Herzog (1919–2012) France, leader of the 1950 French Annapurna expedition, and first ascent of Annapurna (1950)
- Tom Higgins (1944–2018) US, first and first free ascents in US, also in France outside Chamonix
- Lynn Hill (born 1961) US, first free ascent The Nose on El Capitan, Yosemite (1993)
- Sandy Hill (born 1955) US, ascended Everest during the 1996 Mount Everest disaster; completed the Seven Summits
- Edmund Hillary (1919–2008) New Zealand, first ascent of Everest with Norgay on the 1953 British Mount Everest expedition
- Alan Hinkes OBE (born 1954) UK, first Briton to climb all 14 eight-thousanders but his claim was disputed regarding Cho Oyu
- Andreas Hinterstoisser (1914–1936) Germany, killed in the 1936 Eiger climbing disaster, first to climb the Hinterstoisser Traverse
- Yuji Hirayama (born 1969) Japan, World Cup winner in lead (1998, 2000), first to onsight at 8c (5.14b), and speed records on The Nose
- Grace Hoeman (1921–1971) US, led first all-female expedition to Denali, 1970
- Marty Hoey (1951–1982) US, mountain guide and ski patroller, died on Everest attempting to become the first US woman to ascend it
- Charles F. Hoffmann (1838–1913) US, surveyor and mountaineer, several first ascents in Sierra Nevada
- Jim Holloway (born 1954) US, bouldering pioneer, and first to ascend a boulder at the grade of V12 (8A+) with Trice.
- Alex Honnold (born 1985) US, prolific free soloist
- Tom Hornbein (born 1930) US, first ascent of Everest via the West Ridge (1963)
- Steve House (born 1970) US, solo ascent K7 (2004), first ascent of Rupal Face of Nanga Parbat (2005)
- Charles Houston (1913–2009) US, first ascent Mount Foraker (1934), leader of US American to K2 in 1950s
- Alexander Huber (born 1968) Germany, first ascents of hardest rock climbing grades
- Thomas Huber (born 1966) Germany, big wall ascents in Yosemite and Pakistan
- Charles Hudson (1828–1865) UK, first ascents of Monte Rosa (1855) and the Matterhorn (1865)
- Tomaž Humar (1969–2009) Slovenia, solo ascent of Dhaulagiri south wall (1999), northwest face of Ama Dablam (1996)
- Alexander von Humboldt (1769–1859) Germany, set a European altitude record on Chimborazo (1802)
- John Hunt (1910–1998) UK, leader of successful 1953 British Mount Everest expedition
- Mala Honnatti, Indian mountain climber.

== I ==
- Marcel Ichac (1906–1994) France, filmed the first French expedition to the Karakoram (1936), and the successful 1950 French Annapurna expedition
- Dimitar Ilievski (1953–1989) Macedonia, the first Macedonian to climb Everest, died on the descent
- Ulrich Inderbinen (1900–2004) Switzerland, mountain guide with 371 ascents of the Matterhorn, the last at 90 years old
- Alberto Iñurrategi (born 1968) Basque, Spain, 10th person to climb all 14 eight-thousanders (and 4th person to do so without oxygen)
- Andrew Irvine (1902–1924) UK, died on the 1924 British Everest expedition with George Mallory; unlike Mallory, his body has not been found
- R. L. G. Irving (1877–1969) UK, early alpinist and climbing author; introduced George Mallory to climbing

== J ==
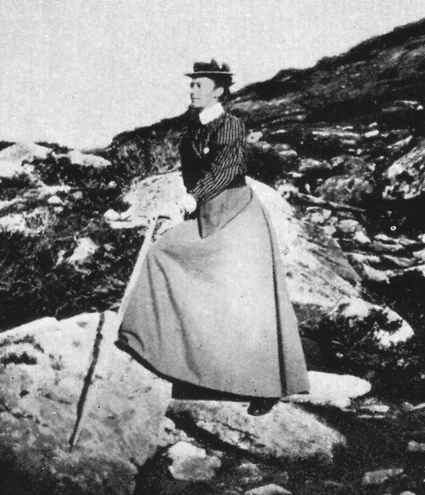
Margaret Jackson

- John Jackson (1921–2005) UK, member of the 1955 British Kangchenjunga expedition; head of Britain's Plas y Brenin centre
- Margaret Jackson (1843–1906) UK, pioneer female mountaineer in the Alps
- Nicolas Jaeger (1946–1980) France, first French ascent of Mount Everest, and one of the first ski descents of an eight-thousander
- Ray Jardine (born 1944) US, first to redpoint at 5.13a (7c+); inventor of spring-loaded camming devices (or "friends")
- Narendra Dhar Jayal (1927–1958) India, founder and first director of the Himalayan Mountaineering Institute
- Ganesh Jena (born 1972) India, first male from the Indian state of Odisha to climb Mount Everest
- Jimmy Jewell (1953–1987) UK, prolific free soloist of the 1970s and 1980s in Britain; died free soloing
- Konstanty Jodko-Narkiewicz (1901–1963) Polish, mountaineer who led the first 1933–34 Polish Andean Expedition
- Alex Johnson (born 1989) US, five-time American national bouldering champion and two-time Bouldering World Cup stage winner
- Raghav Joneja (born 1997) India, youngest Indian to climb Mount Everest
- Chris Jones (1939–2024) UK–US, first ascent of north face of North Twin Peak and other routes in Rockies and Andes
- Kevin Jorgeson (born 1984) US, first free climb of the Dawn Wall of El Capitan in Yosemite National Park, US

== K ==
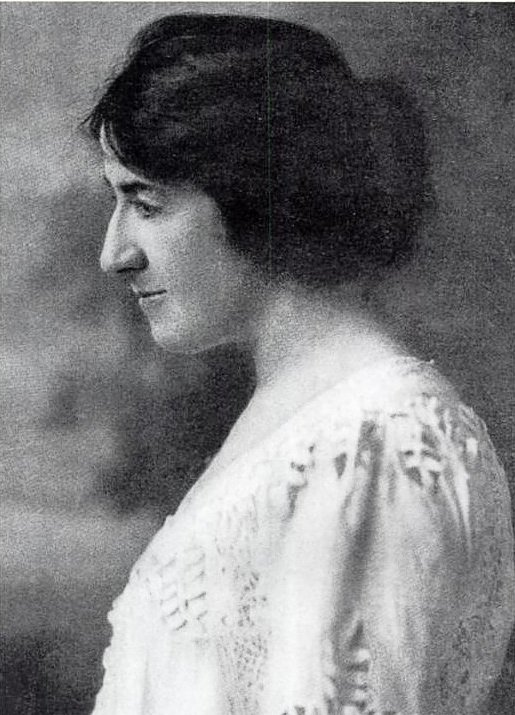
Dora Keen

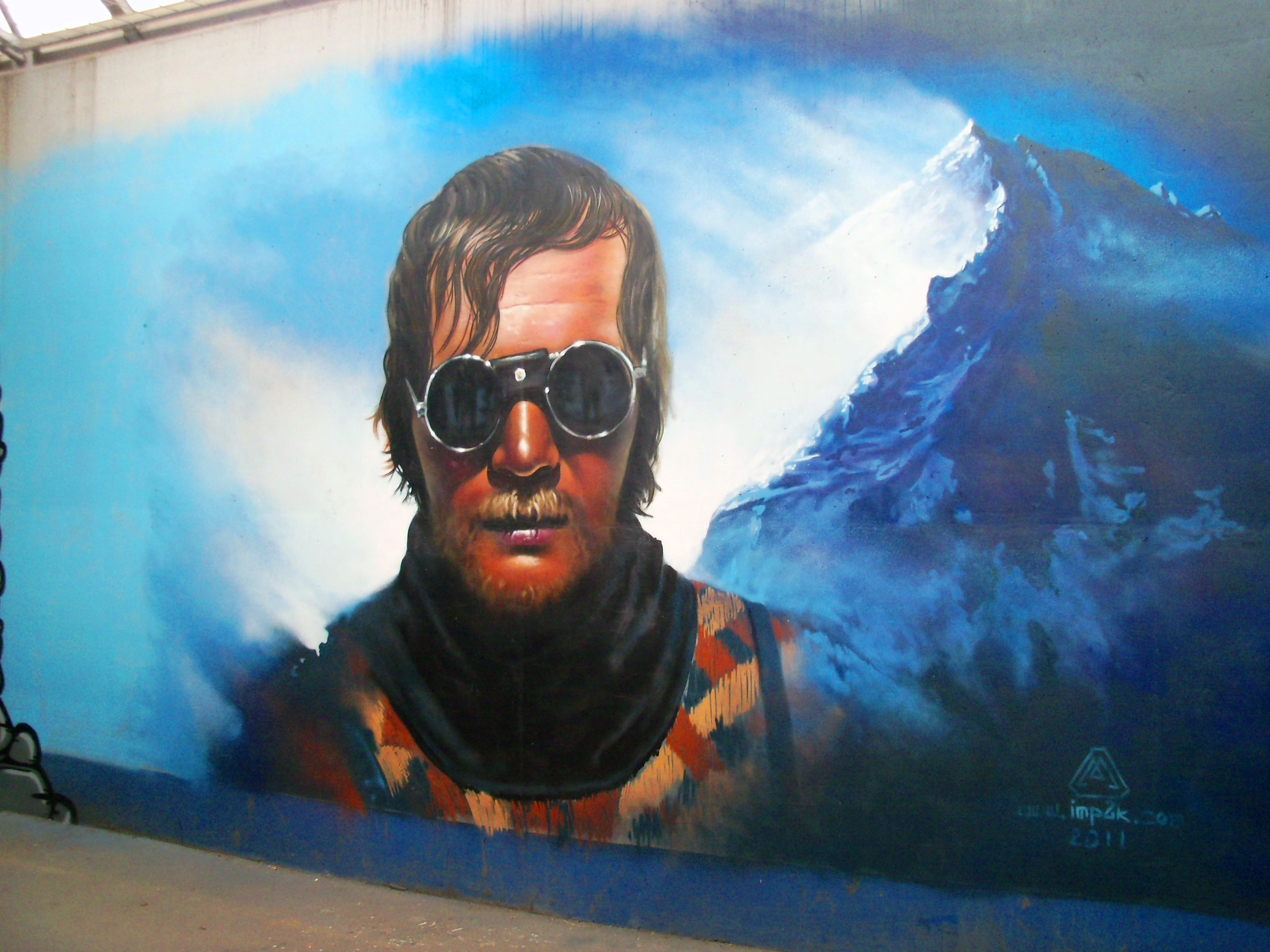
Jerzy Kukuczka

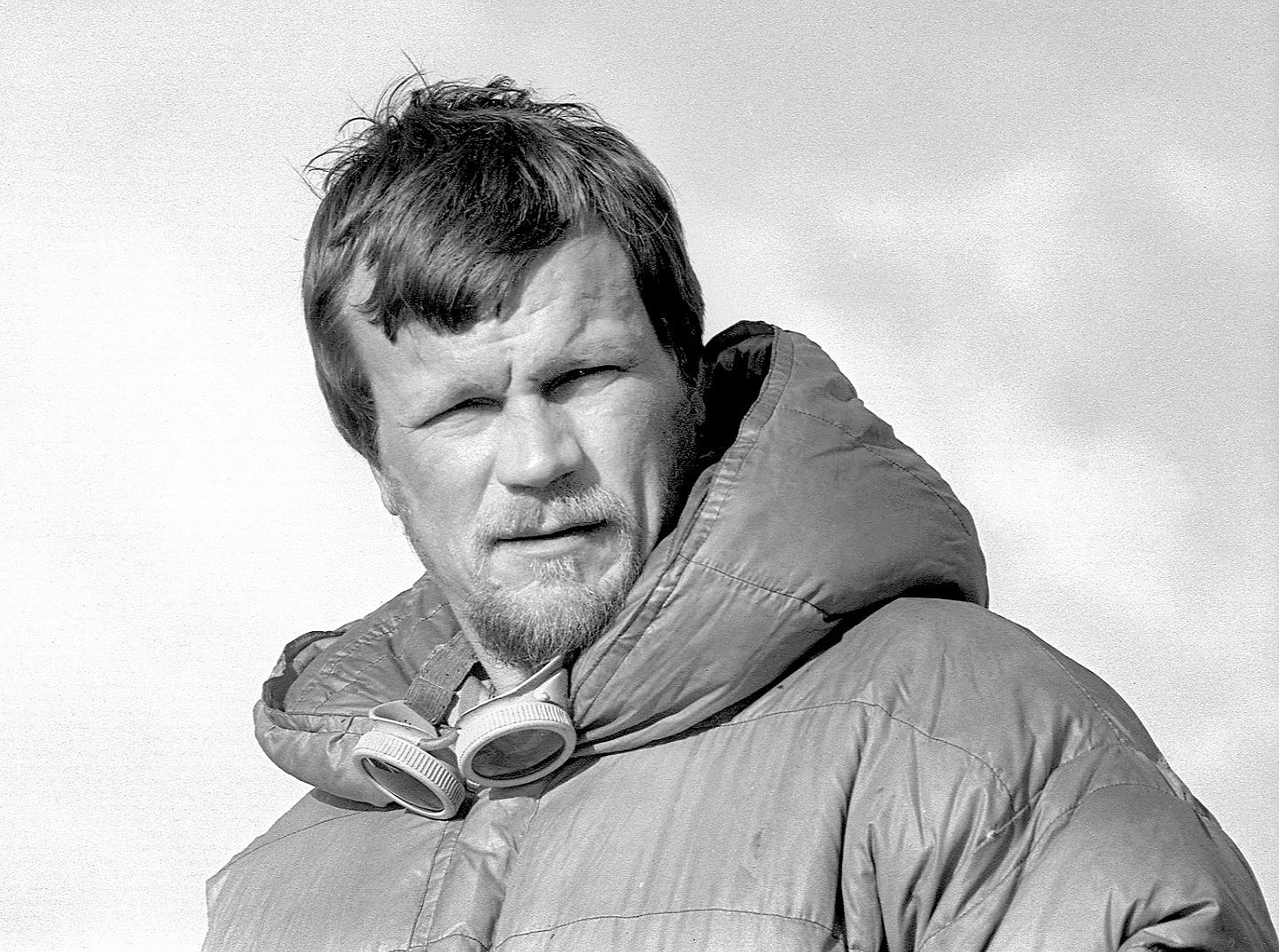
Jaan Künnap

- Conrad Kain (1883–1934) Austria/Canada, over 50 first ascents in the Canadian Rockies including Mount Robson
- Gerlinde Kaltenbrunner (born 1970) Austria, the first woman to climb all 14 eight-thousanders without supplemental oxygen
- Bob Kamps (1931–2005) US, pioneer of the golden age of Yosemite climbing and 5.10 and 5.11 routes in America
- Harish Kapadia (born 1945) India, Himalayan veteran
- Meherban Karim (1979–2008) Pakistan, Gasherbrum II, Nanga Parbat, and K2 (all three without supplementary oxygen), died on descent of K2
- Silvo Karo (born 1960) Slovenia, 300+ first ascents, lifetime achievement Piolet d'Or awardee
- Fritz Kasparek (1910–1954) Austria, first ascent of Eiger north face
- Peter Kaufmann (1858–1924) Switzerland, guide in Alps and Canadian Rockies
- Ron Kauk (born 1957) US, rock climber, many first ascents in Yosemite, stunt work for climbing movies
- Robert Kayen (born 1959) US, rock climber, professor, scientist, first solo ascent of West Buttress of El Capitan
- Dora Keen (1871–1963) US, ascents in Alps, member of Royal Geographical Society, 1914
- Alexander Kellas (1868–1921) UK, altitude record in 1911 on summit of Pauhunri (7,128 m)
- Pat Kelly (died 1922) UK, rock climber and founder of Pinnacle Club
- E. S. Kennedy (1817–1898) UK, first ascent Monte Disgrazia, Mont Blanc du Tacul
- Mikhail Khergiani (1932–1969) Svan mountaineer of Soviet Georgia, known as the Tiger of the Rocks
- Clarence King (1842–1901) US, geologist and climber, first director of USGS, first ascent Mount Tyndall
- Andy Kirkpatrick (born 1971) UK, rock and ice climber
- Colin Kirkus (1910–1942) UK, rock climber and alpinist
- Remy Kloos South Africa, first South African to summit both Mount Everest and Lhotse within 24 hours (2022).
- Christian Klucker (1853–1928) Switzerland, guide, prolific first ascensionist in Bernina Range and Bregaglia
- M.S. Kohli (born 1931) India, leader of the Indian Everest expedition (1965)
- Layton Kor (1938–2013) US, rock climber and mountaineer, author of Beyond the Vertical
- Dai Koyamada (born 1976) Japan, sport climber and boulderer
- Jon Krakauer (born 1954) US, author and mountaineer, Everest (1996)
- Hans Kraus (1905–1995) Austria, rock climber, sports medicine and physical medicine and rehabilitation pioneer
- Göran Kropp (1966–2002) Sweden, cycled a bike from Sweden to Everest, soloed Everest without oxygen, and then cycled home (1996)
- Moriz von Kuffner (1854–1939) Austria, first ascents including Eiger north-east face and Mount Maudit's Kuffner Ridge
- Julius Kugy (1858–1944) Austria-Slovenia, father of modern mountaineering in the Julian Alps
- Jerzy Kukuczka (1948–1989) Poland, the second man to climb all 8,000m peaks (9 new routes), four eight-thousanders in winter, only person to climb two eight-thousanders in one winter
- Colonel Narendra Kumar (1933–2020) India, Siachen Glacier and Himalayan veteran
- Jaan Künnap (born 1948) Estonia, mountaineer, and photographer
- Janusz Kurczab (1937–2015) Poland, led 1976 Polish unsuccessful expedition to tackle the northeast ridge of K2
- Wojciech Kurtyka (born 1947) Poland, pioneer of alpine style in high mountains
- Toni Kurz (1913–1936) Germany, attempted Eiger north face in 1936, died during retreat

== L ==
- Constantin Lăcătușu (born 1961) Romania
- Lino Lacedelli (1925–2009) Italy, first ascent K2 (1954) with Achille Compagnoni
- Louis Lachenal (1921–1955) France, first ascent of Annapurna 1950, with Maurice Herzog; died skiing in Chamonix
- Jean-Christophe Lafaille (1965–2006) France, 11 eight-thousanders without supplementary oxygen; died on Makalu
- David Lama (1990–2019) Austria, climber and alpinist, notable for the first free ascent of Cerro Torre
- Katie Lamb (born 1997) US, first female to climb an 8C+ (V16) boulder with Box Therapy (2023)
- Raymond Lambert (1914–1997) Switzerland, reached 8611m, highest altitude at that time, with 1952 Swiss Everest expedition
- Eric Langmuir (1931–2005), UK, climber, mountain educationalist and avalanche researcher
- Samantha Larson (born 1988) US, youngest person to complete Seven Summits, at 18 in 2007
- Marc-André Leclerc (1992–2018) Canada, first winter solo ascents of the Torre Egger in Patagonia and the Emperor Face of Mount Robson
- Pete Livesey (1943–1998) UK, influential rock climber in the 1970s
- John Long (born 1953) US, rock climber and writer; author of How to Rock Climb series
- Erhard Loretan (1959–2011) Switzerland, 14 8,000m-plus summits (1982–1995)
- Alex Lowe (1958–1999) US, climbed Great Trango Tower, Rakekniven in Antarctica and Sail Peak on Baffin Island; died on Shishapangma
- George Lowe (1924–2013) New Zealand, member of 1953 British Mount Everest Expedition
- George Lowe (born 1944) US, alpinist and rock climber, notable for first ascents in the US and Canadian Rockies, Alps, Andes, and Himalayas
- Jeff Lowe (1950–2018) US, made over 1000 first ascents in the US and Canadian Rockies, Alps and Himalayas
- Fritz Luchsinger (1921–1983) Switzerland, first ascent of Lhotse, in 1956

== M ==
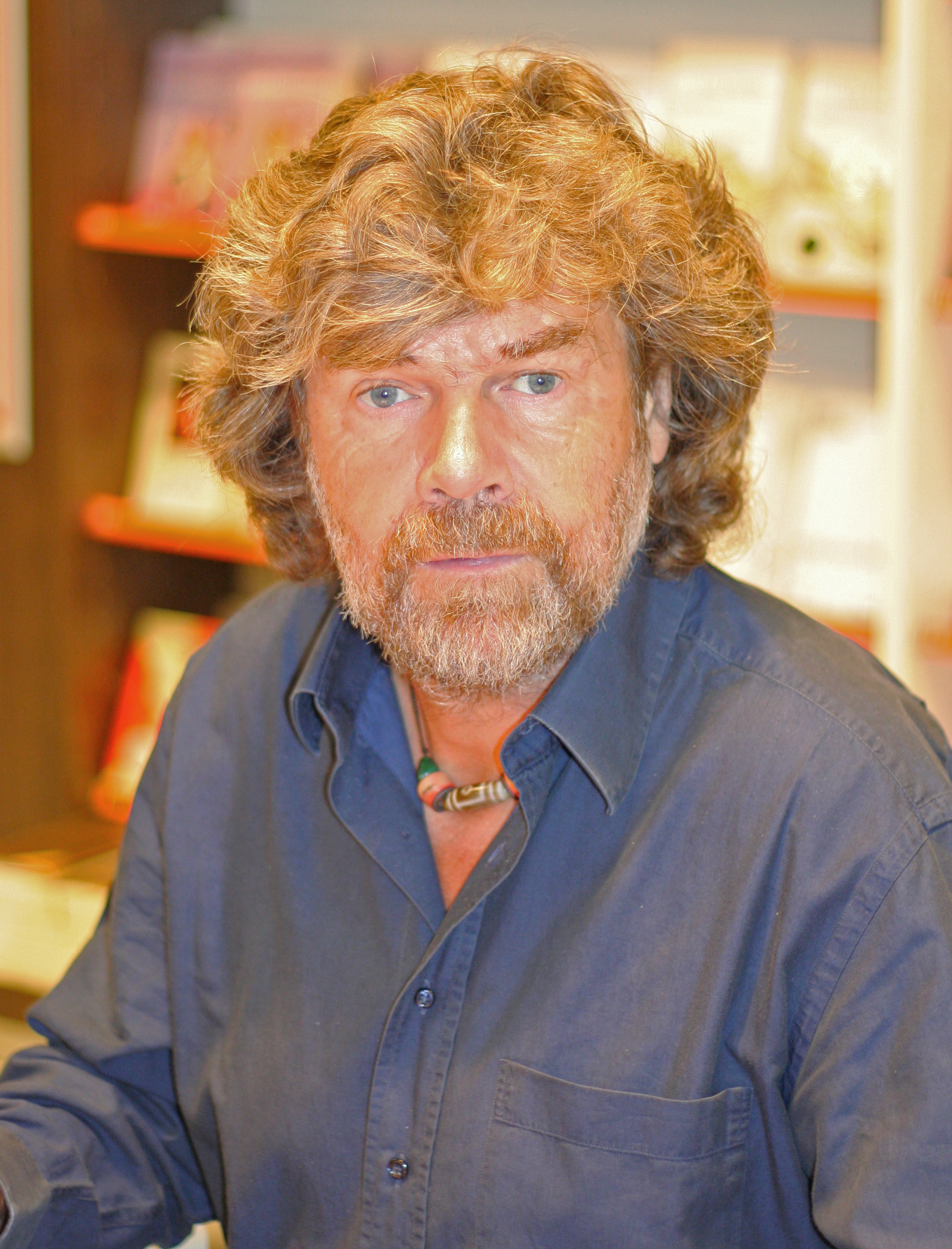
Reinhold Messner

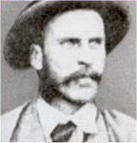
Thomas Middlemore

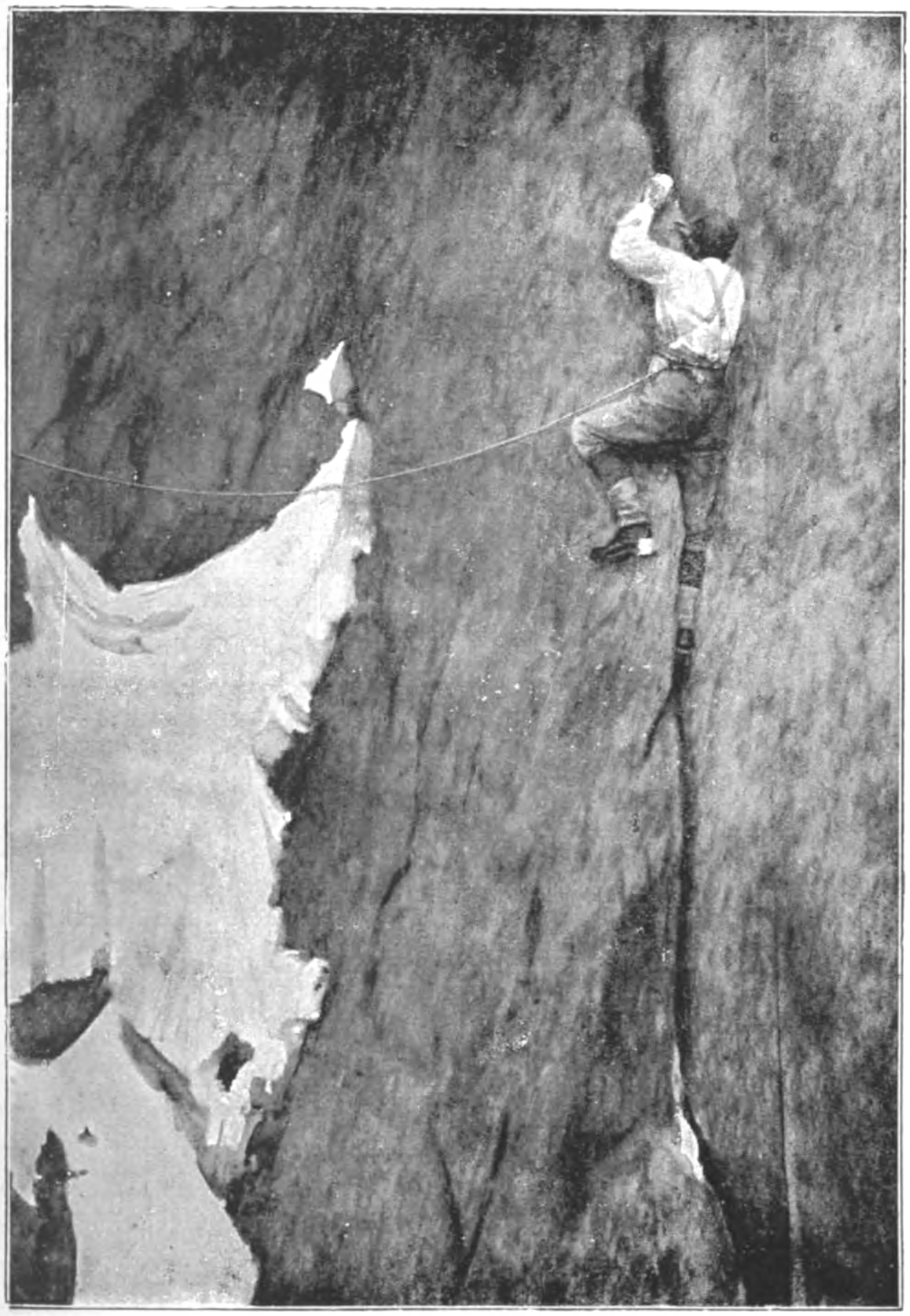
Albert F. Mummery

- Meherban Karim (1979–2008) Pakistan, Gasherbrum II, Nanga Parbat, K2 without supplementary oxygen
- Ashish Mane (born 1990) India, Everest (2012), Lhotse (2013), Makalu (2014), Manaslu (2017)
- Tim Macartney-Snape (born 1956) Australia, Everest (1984), first to climb Everest from sea level (1990)
- Tomasz Mackiewicz (1975–2018) Poland, died on winter alpine-style ascent of Nanga Parbat
- Dave MacLeod (born 1978) Scotland, made the first free ascent of the world's first E11 traditional climbing route
- M. Magendran (born 1963) Malaysia, Everest (1997), first Malaysian/Tamil to reach the summit
- Nasuh Mahruki (born 1968) Turkey, Snow Leopard, first Turkish and Muslim climber of Everest
- Janusz Majer (born September 25, 1946) Poland
- Maki Yūkō (1894–1989) Japan, first ascents of Mittellegigrat (Eiger northeast ridge), Mount Alberta; first winter ascent of Mount Yari; led Manaslu first ascent
- Tashi and Nungshi Malik (born 1991) India, many world first female twins records
- George Mallory (1886–1924) UK, initial 1921 British Reconnaissance Expedition and the 1922 and 1924 British Mount Everest expeditions, died on Everest at 8,150+ metres
- Sergio Martini (born 1949) Italy, seventh ascent of all eight-thousanders (1983–2000)
- Marie Marvingt (1875–1963) France, first woman to climb most major peaks in the French and Swiss Alps (1903–7)
- William Mathews (1828–1901) UK, founder of Alpine Club, first ascent Monte Viso, Grande Casse
- Chantal Mauduit (1964–1998) France, six 8,000m summits without supplementary oxygen, died on Dhaulagiri
- John Oakley Maund (died 1902) UK, first ascents in Mont Blanc massif
- Eylem Elif Maviş (born 1973) Turkey, first Turkish female ascent of Everest (2006)
- Pierre Mazeaud (born 1929) France, Walter Bonatti's climbing partner, first French ascent of Everest (1978)
- Daniel Mazur (born 1960) US, numerous ascents in the Himalayas and America
- Steve McClure (born 1970) UK, first Briton to climb 9a twice
- Duncan McDuffie (1877–1951) US, summits in the Sierra Nevada
- Richard "Dick" McGowan (1933–2007) US, first US successful ascent of Everest, International Himalayan Expedition (1955)
- Ammon McNeely (born 1970) US, noteworthy first one-day ascents and speed records on El Capitan, Yosemite and Zion big walls
- Alex Megos (born 1993) first climber to on-sight 5.14d/9a route
- Willy Merkl (1900–1934) Germany, led two expeditions to Nanga Parbat (1932, 1934), died on the mountain
- Alain Mesili (born 1949) France, disputed ascent on Fitz Roy (1970) with Ricardo Arzela, pioneered routes in Bolivia
- Günther Messner (1946–1970) Italy, died on Nanga Parbat
- Reinhold Messner (born 1944) Italy, first to climb all eight-thousanders (1970–1986) and without supplementary oxygen, first ascent without supplementary oxygen of Everest with Peter Habeler (1978) first solo Everest (1980)
- Tracee Metcalfe US, only living American woman to have climbed 13 of the 14 eight-thousanders
- Enid Michael (1883–1966) US, known for ropeless climbing in Yosemite in the early 1900s
- John Middendorf (born 1959) US, big-wall rock climber, first ascent East Wall Great Trango Tower (1992)
- Thomas Middlemore (1842–1923) UK, first ascents in Mont Blanc and Bernina massifs, and Bernese Alps
- Ellen Miller (born 1959) US, first American woman to summit Nuptse and Everest from both sides
- Gwen Moffat (born 1924) UK, author of Space Below My Feet (1961)
- Jerry Moffatt (born 1963) UK, sport climber and boulderer
- Silvio Mondinelli (born 1968) Italy, 13th to climb all eight-thousanders (sixth without supplementary oxygen)
- Park Moo-taek (1969–2004) Korea, former Guinness World Record holder for fastest time to climb the world's three tallest mountains
- Ben Moon (born 1966) UK, sport climber, and boulderer, world's first 8c+ (5.14c) with Hubble
- A. W. Moore (1841–1887) UK, first ascent Fiescherhorn, Barre des Écrins, Piz Roseg, Ober Gabelhorn
- Tyrhee Moore US, member of the first all-African-American team to climb Denali
- Martin Moran (1955-2019) UK, mountain guide and author
- Fritz Moravec (1922–1997) Austria, first ascent Gasherbrum II (1956)
- Piotr Morawski (1976–2009) Poland, many 8000m summits, died on Dhaulagiri/Manasu expedition
- Nea Morin (1905–1986) UK, rock climber and mountain climber
- Simone Moro (born 1967) Italy, first winter ascents of Shishapangma, Makalu, Gasherbrum II, and Nanga Parbat
- Don Morrison (1929–1977) UK, pioneer of Alpine Style, first ascents in Canada, England, and Himalayas
- Patrick Morrow (born 1952) Canada, first to complete both Bass and Messner Seven Summits lists (1986)
- Tomáš Mrázek (born 1982) Czechoslovakia, rock climber, World Champion 2003, 2005, winner of World Cup 2004
- John Muir (1838–1914) Scottish-born US conservationist and mountaineer, summits in California and Alaska
- Norrie Muir (1948–2019) Scotland, prolific winter first ascentionist in Scotland
- Albert F. Mummery (1855–1895) UK, Alpine and Himalayan pioneer, killed on Nanga Parbat
- Don Munday (1890–1950) Canada, mountaineer and explorer, husband of Phyllis Munday, explored region around Mount Waddington
- Phyllis Munday (1894–1990) Canada, mountaineer and explorer, explored region around Mount Waddington
- Malli Mastan Babu (1974–2015) India, mountaineer and explorer, world record in completing seven summits in 172 days

== N ==
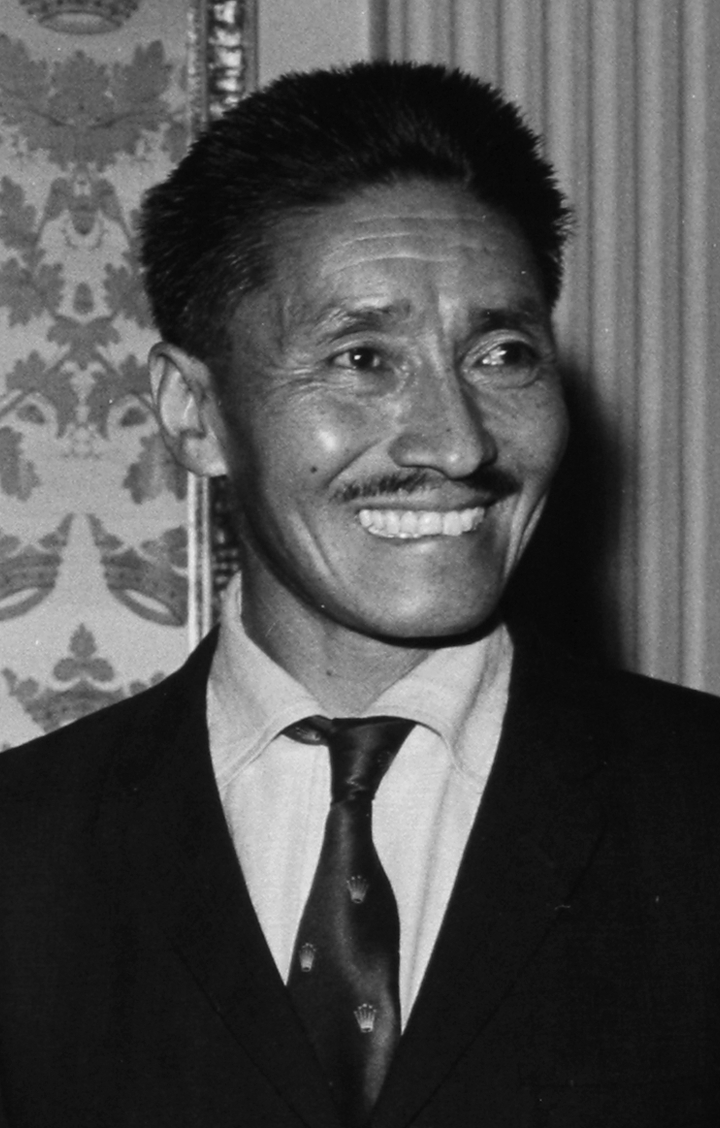
Tenzing Norgay

- Kenro Nakajima (1984–2024) Japan, three time Piolet d'Or winner, died on K2
- Yasuko Namba (1949–1996) Japan, oldest woman at the time to climb Everest at 47 (1996), died on descent
- Wasfia Nazreen (born 1982) Bangladesh, only Bengali person to climb K2 (2022) and first Bengali and Bangladeshi to finish the Seven Summits (2012).
- Vitor Negrete (1967–2006) Brazil, first Brazilian to climb Mount Everest without supplementary oxygen
- Hilaree Nelson (1972–2022) United States, first female to summit two 8000-meter peaks in one 24 hour push (2012). First ski descent Lhotse Couloir from the summit (2018); died on Manaslu
- Fred Nicole Switzerland, numerous first ascents of sport routes and boulders
- Eleonore Noll-Hasenclever (1880–1925) Germany, first woman to climb eastern wall of Monte Rosa (1919); killed by avalanche on the Bishorn
- Jamling Tenzing Norgay (born 1965) Nepal, son of Tenzing Norgay, climbed Everest with Edmund Hillary's son, Peter Hillary (2003)
- Tenzing Norgay (1914–1986) Sherpa, first ascent Everest (1953) with Edmund Hillary
- Edward F. Norton (1884–1954) leader of 1924 British Mount Everest Expedition with Mallory and Irvine
- Sue Nott (1969–2006) US, ice climber and first American woman to climb the Eiger north face in winter (2003)
- Wilfrid Noyce (1917–1962) UK, on Everest expedition (1953), reaching South Col, killed in Pamirs (1962)
- Arne Næss (1912–2009) Norway, philosopher and mountaineer, leader of expedition on first ascent Tirich Mir (1950)
- Arne Næss jr. (1937–2004) Norway, leader, Norwegian Everest expedition (1985)

== O ==
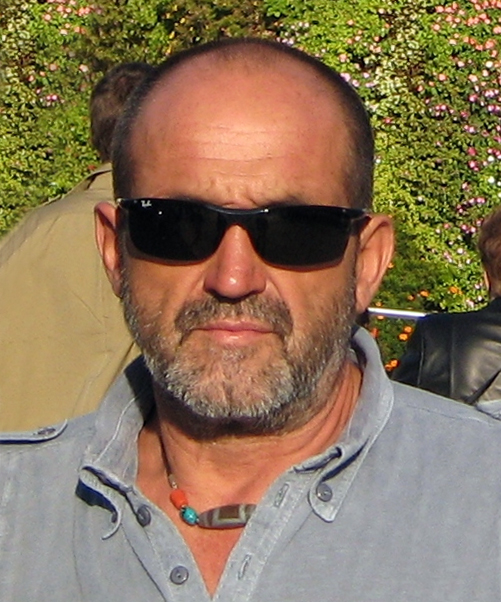
Juanito Oiarzabal

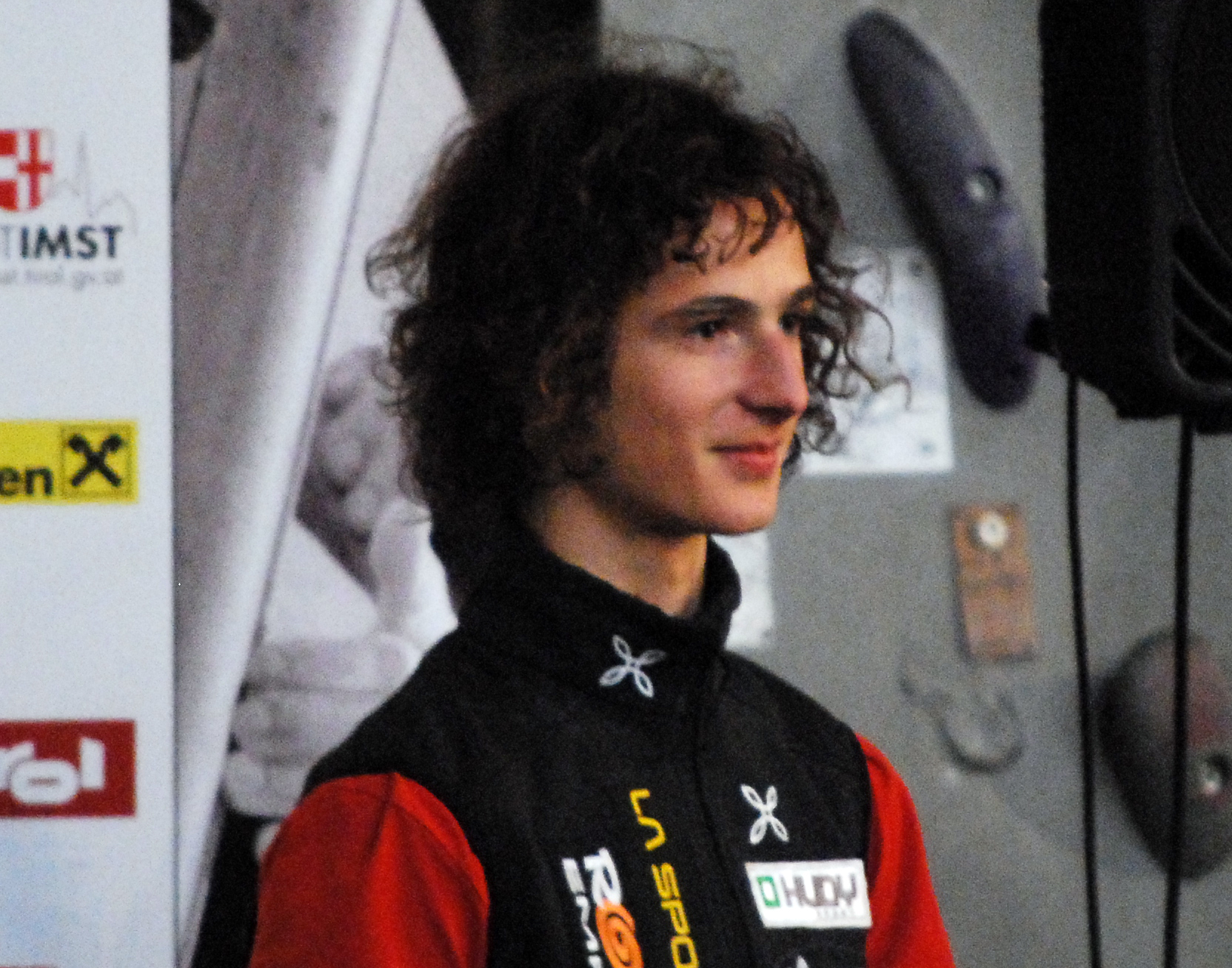
Adam Ondra

- Vanessa O'Brien (born 1964) First British-American woman to summit K2
- Cathy O'Dowd (born 1968) South Africa, first female ascent of Everest from both north and south (1999), fourth female ascent Lhotse (2000)
- Oh Eun-Sun (born 1966) South Korea, first Korean woman to climb Seven Summits, controversy over eight-thousanders claim
- Juanito Oiarzabal (born 1956) Basque (Spain), all eight-thousanders without supplementary oxygen, record 24 ascents of eight-thousanders
- Clare O'Leary (born 1972) Ireland, first Irish woman to climb Mount Everest (2004)
- Adam Ondra (born 1993) Czech Republic, first to redpoint a 9c
- Dan Osman (1963–1998) US, rock climber, soloist, killed whilst attempting his new sport of rope jumping
- James Outram (1864–1925) Canada, first ascent of Mount Assiniboine

== P ==
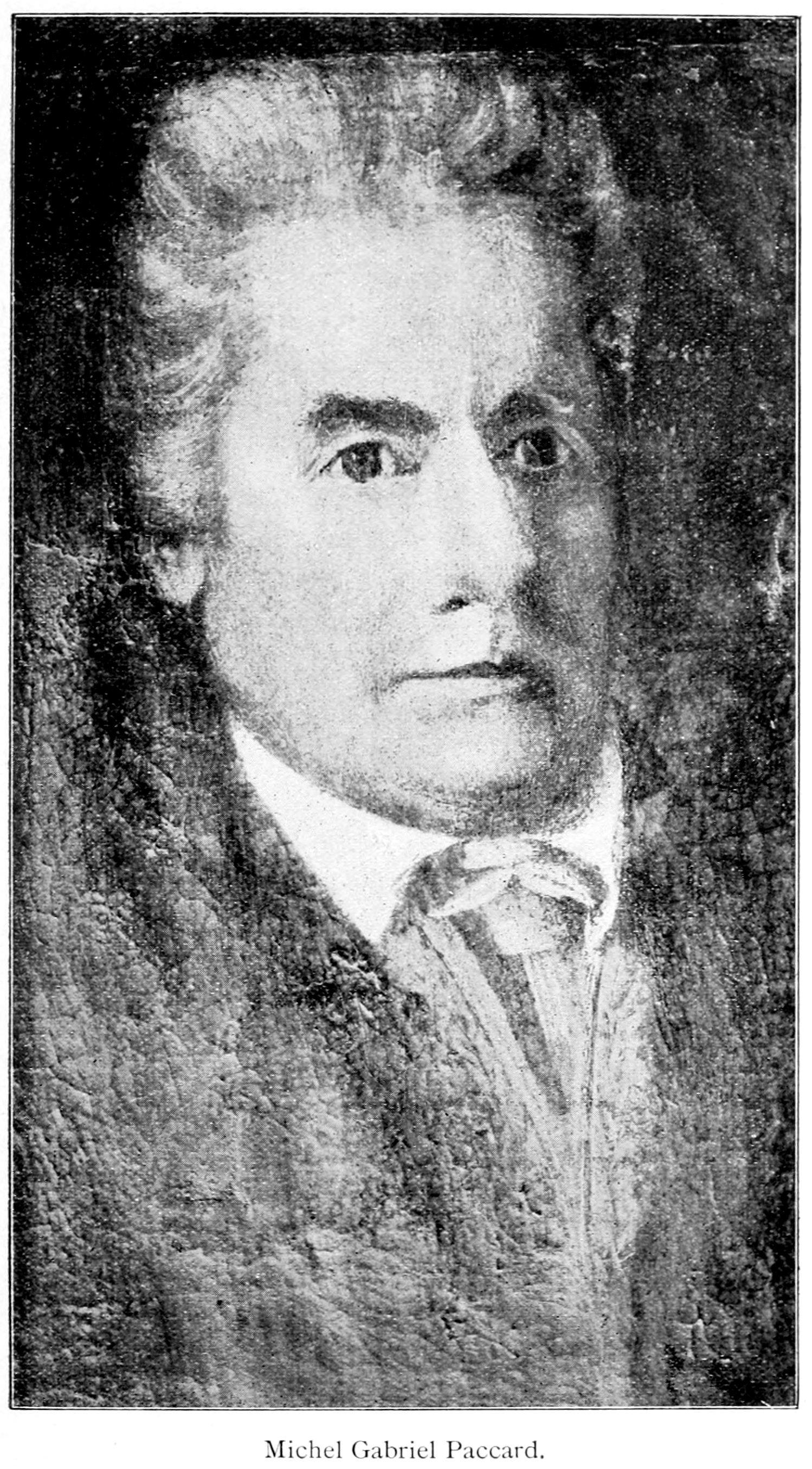
Michel-Gabriel Paccard

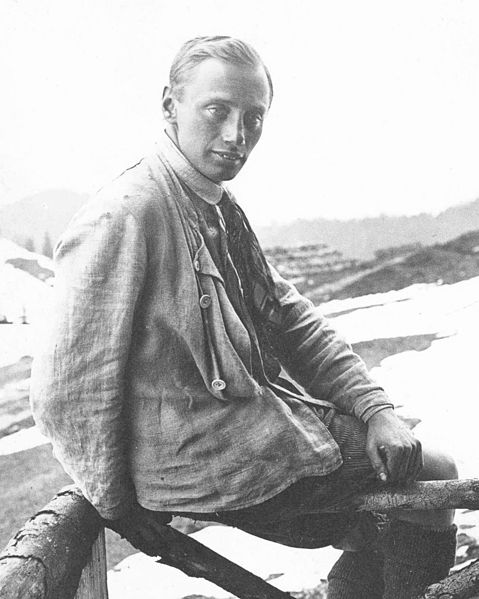
Paul Preuss

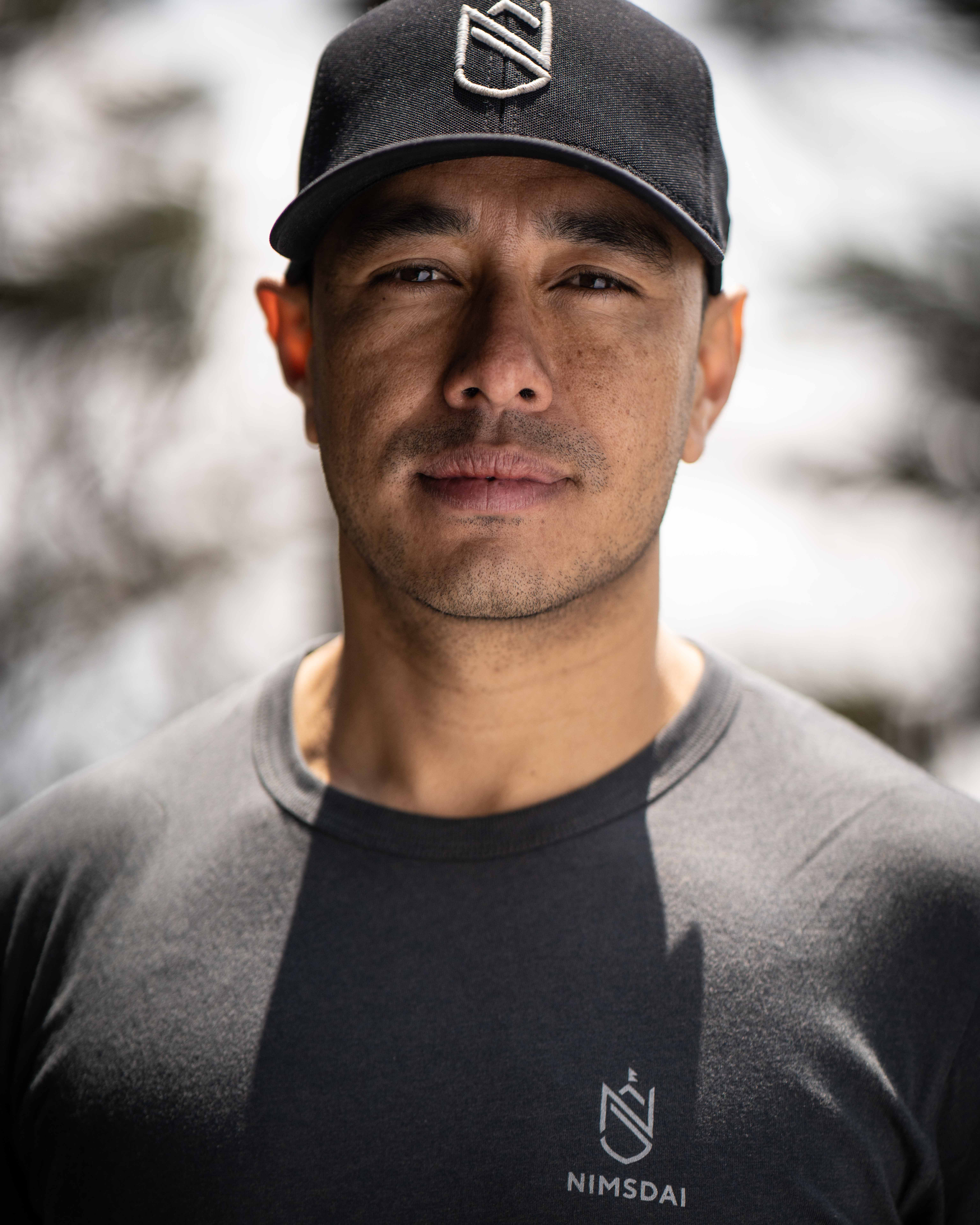
Nirmal Purja "Nimsdai"

- Michel-Gabriel Paccard (1757–1827) France, first ascent Mont Blanc (1786)
- Pur Bahadur Gurung (1988–2026) Nepal, fastest to climb K2 (in 24 hours), died on 2026 Broad Peak avalanche
- Bachendri Pal (born 1954) first Indian female ascent (and fifth female ascent) Everest
- Tsewang Paljor (1968–1996) India, died on Everest in 1996 Mount Everest disaster
- Ines Papert (born 1974) German ice climber, apinist and author
- Marie Paradis (1757–1827) France, first female ascent Mont Blanc (1809)
- Young-seok Park (1963–2011) South Korea, first true Explorers Grand Slam (2005), died on Annapurna
- Elizabeth Parker (1856–1944) Canada, journalist and mountaineer
- Edurne Pasaban (born 1973) Basque, Spain, first woman to climb all eight-thousanders
- Pasang Lhamu Sherpa (1961–1993) first Nepali woman to summit Everest, died on descent (1993)
- Tom Patey (1932–1970) UK, first ascent Muztagh Tower (1956), Am Buachaille (1968), killed in abseiling accident, author of One Man's Mountains
- Krushnaa Patil (born 1989) India, second youngest Indian girl to climb Mount Everest
- Maciej Pawlikowski (born 1951) Poland, first winter ascent of Cho Oyu
- Ryszard Pawłowski
- Julius Payer (1841–1915) Czech-Austrian polar explorer who made many first ascents in the Adamello and Ortler mountains in the 1860s
- Annie Smith Peck (1850–1935) US, mountaineer
- William Penhall (1858–1882) UK, first ascent Matterhorn west face
- Jim Perrin (born 1947) UK, over 200 first/free ascents in Britain
- Oliver Perry-Smith (1884–1969) US, a rock climber in Saxon Switzerland and the Dolomites
- Petrarch (1304–1374) Italy, climbed Mont Ventoux (1336)
- Elfrida Pigou (1911–1960) Canadian female climber, discovered crash site of Trans-Canada Air Lines Flight 810, died on Mount Waddington
- Tadeusz Piotrowski mountaineer
- Burçak Özoğlu Poçan (born 1970) Turkey, first Turkish female over 8,000 m (2005)
- Klára Poláčková (born 1978) first Czech female to ascent Everest
- Dean Potter (1972–2015) US, speed soloed El Cap in 4:17; speed soloed El Cap and Half Dome in one day
- Paul Preuss (1886–1913) Austria, an early promoter of free climbing, climbed 1200 peaks in his short life
- Marko Prezelj, Slovenian mountaineer and winner of 4 Piolet d'Ors (1992, 2007, 2015, 2016)
- Paul Pritchard (born 1967) UK, rock climber
- Hristo Prodanov (1943–1984) Bulgaria, soloed Lhotse (1981) and Everest (1984), died on the descent
- Bonnie Prudden (1914–2011) pioneering US rock climber and exercise advocate, 30 documented first ascents in the Gunks
- Karl Prusik (1896–1961) Austria, introduced widely used Prusik knot
- Ramón Julián Puigblanque (born 1981) Spain, rock climber
- Nirmal Purja (1983–2026) Nepal, first to climb all fourteen 8000 meter mountains in one season (6 months, 6 days, with supplemental oxygen), died on 2026 Broad Peak avalanche
- Ludwig Purtscheller (1849–1900) first ascent Kilimanjaro (1889)
- Piotr Pustelnik (born 1951) Poland, 20th person to climb all 14 eight thousanders
- Boyan Petrov (born 1973) Bulgaria, climbed 10 out of 14 eight-thousanders, all without supplementary oxygen

== R ==
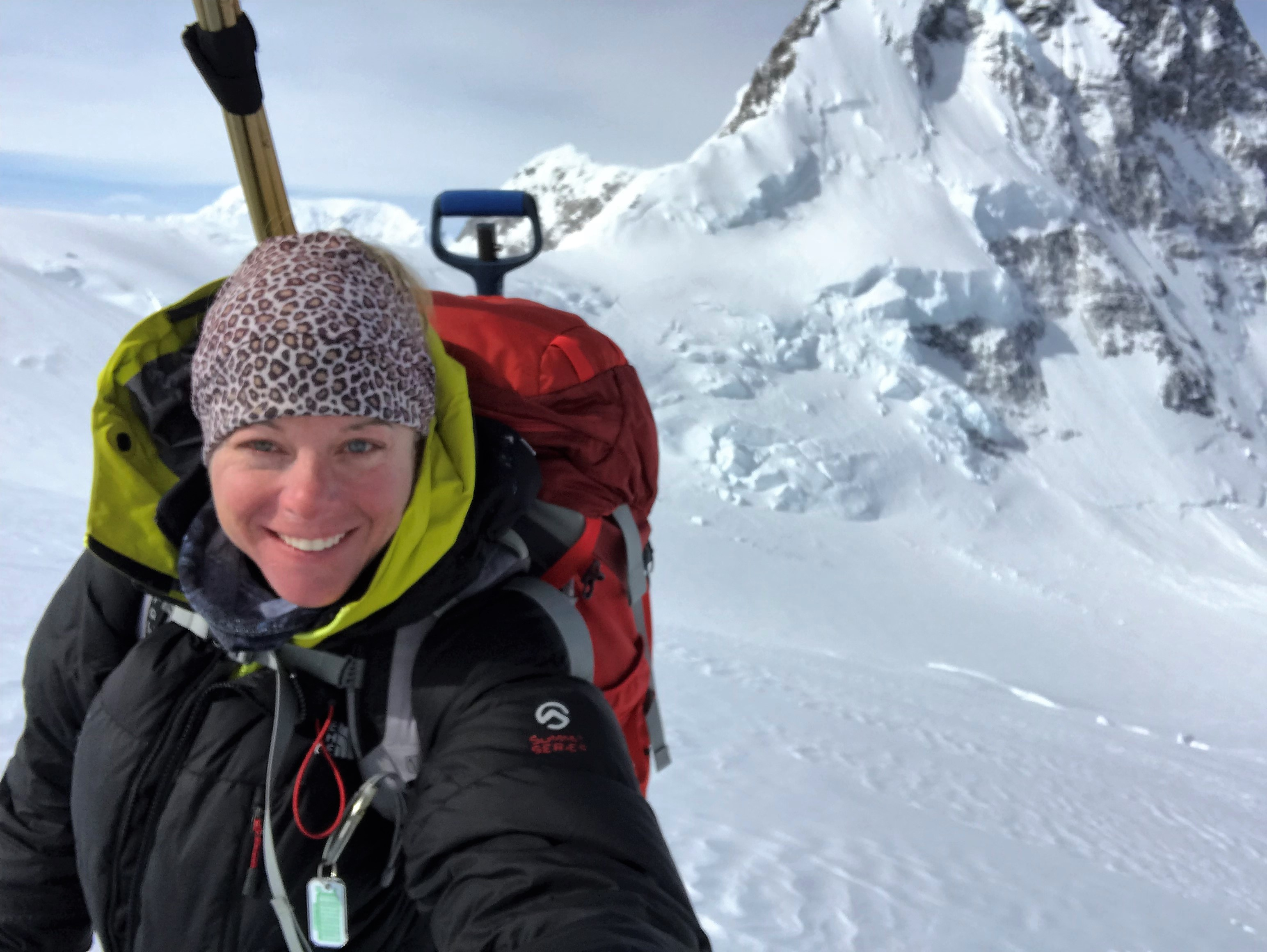
Monique Richard

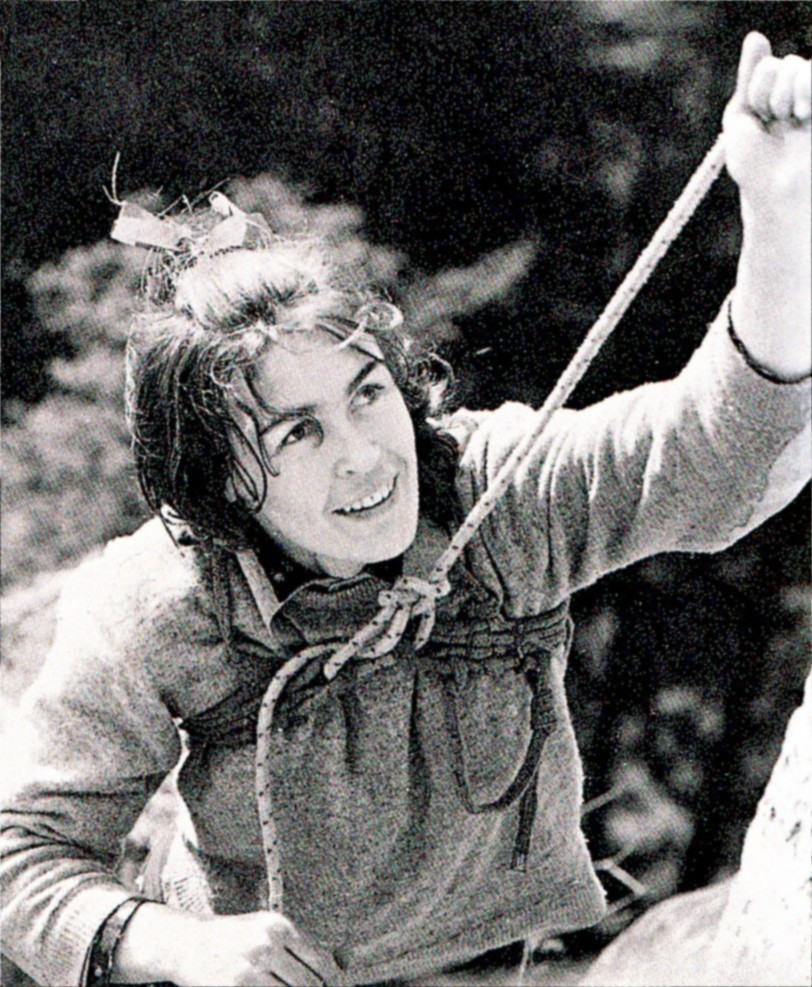
Wanda Rutkiewicz

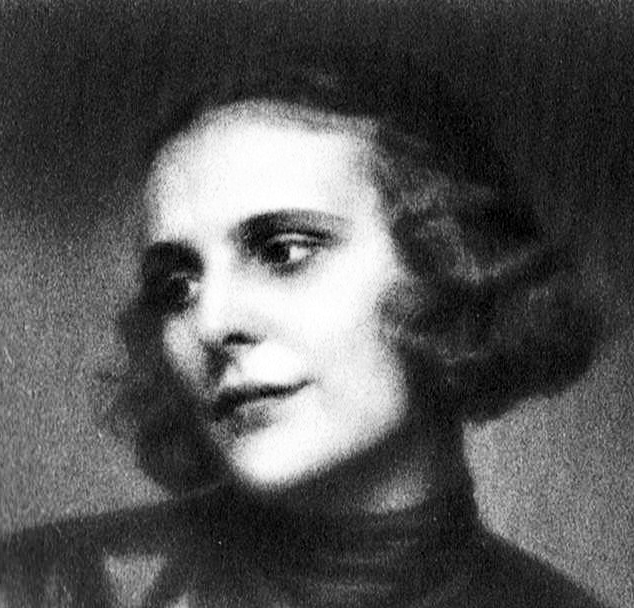
Leni Riefenstahl

- Brooke Raboutou (born 2001) US, member of the 2020 American Olympic climbing team
- Aron Ralston (born 1975) US, gained fame after amputating his right arm to free himself after a canyoneering incident
- Paul Ramsden (born 1969), England, first alpinist to win the Piolet d'Or five times
- Tom Randall UK, first free ascent of Century Crack 5.14b (8c)
- Lisa Rands (born 1975) US, rock climber and boulderer
- Michael Reardon (1974–2007) US, prolific free solo climber and film producer
- Dave Rearick (born 1934) US, rock climber, first ascent of Diamond on Longs Peak (1960)
- Gaston Rébuffat (1921–1985) France, 1950 Annapurna expedition, first to climb all six great north faces of the Alps, Alpine guide and author
- Ernst Reiss (1920–2010) Swiss, first ascent of Lhotse (1956)
- Monique Richard (born 1975) Canada, first woman to solo climb Mount Logan, first Canadian woman to summit Mt Makalu, Seven Summits in 32 months
- Dorothy Pilley Richards (1894–1986) UK, wrote Climbing Days (1935)
- Katharine Richardson (1854–1927) UK, a mountaineer in the Alps in the 1880s
- Mark Richey (born 1958) US, two-time winner of the Piolet d'Or in 2012 and 2020
- Rick Ridgeway (born 1950) US, member of the first American team to summit K2
- Leni Riefenstahl (1902–2003) Germany, filmmaker, actress, and mountaineer
- Ang Rita (1948–2020) Sherpa, climbed Everest ten times without supplemental oxygen
- Royal Robbins (1935–2017) US, rock climber, pioneer of modern Yosemite climbing in the 1950s
- Alain Robert (born 1962) France, climber and builderer
- David Roberts (1943–2021) US, author, first ascents of Wickersham Wall (Denali) and other Alaskan peaks
- Paul Robinson (born 1987) US, rock climber and boulderer
- André Roch (1906–2002) Switzerland, Everest 1952 attempt, many first ascents in Alps and Asia
- Beth Rodden (born 1980) US, rock climber and first female to match the highest male grades in traditional climbing with Meltdown 5.14d (9a)
- Jordan Romero (born 1996) US, became the youngest person to climb Everest on May 22, 2010, aged 13 years, 10 months, 10 days
- Steve Roper guidebook writer, editor of Ascent, first ascent of West Buttress of El Capitan.
- John Roskelley (born 1948) US, author, alpinist, Himalayan climber notable for technical first ascents of 7000 and 8000 m peaks
- Fred Rouhling (born 1970) France, rock climber, notable for the world's fourth 9a (5.14d) rock climb (and first in France), and the controversy over Akira
- Alan Rouse (1951–1986) UK, soloed many of hardest routes of day, died on descent from K2 (1986)
- Galen Rowell (1940–2002) US, photographer and mountaineer, first one-day ascents of Denali and Kilimanjaro, first ascent Great Trango Tower
- Henry Russell (1834–1909) France/Ireland, prolific first ascensionist in Pyrenees
- Wanda Rutkiewicz (1943–1992) Poland, first woman on K2, 8,000m-peak veteran, died attempting Kanchenjunga

== S ==
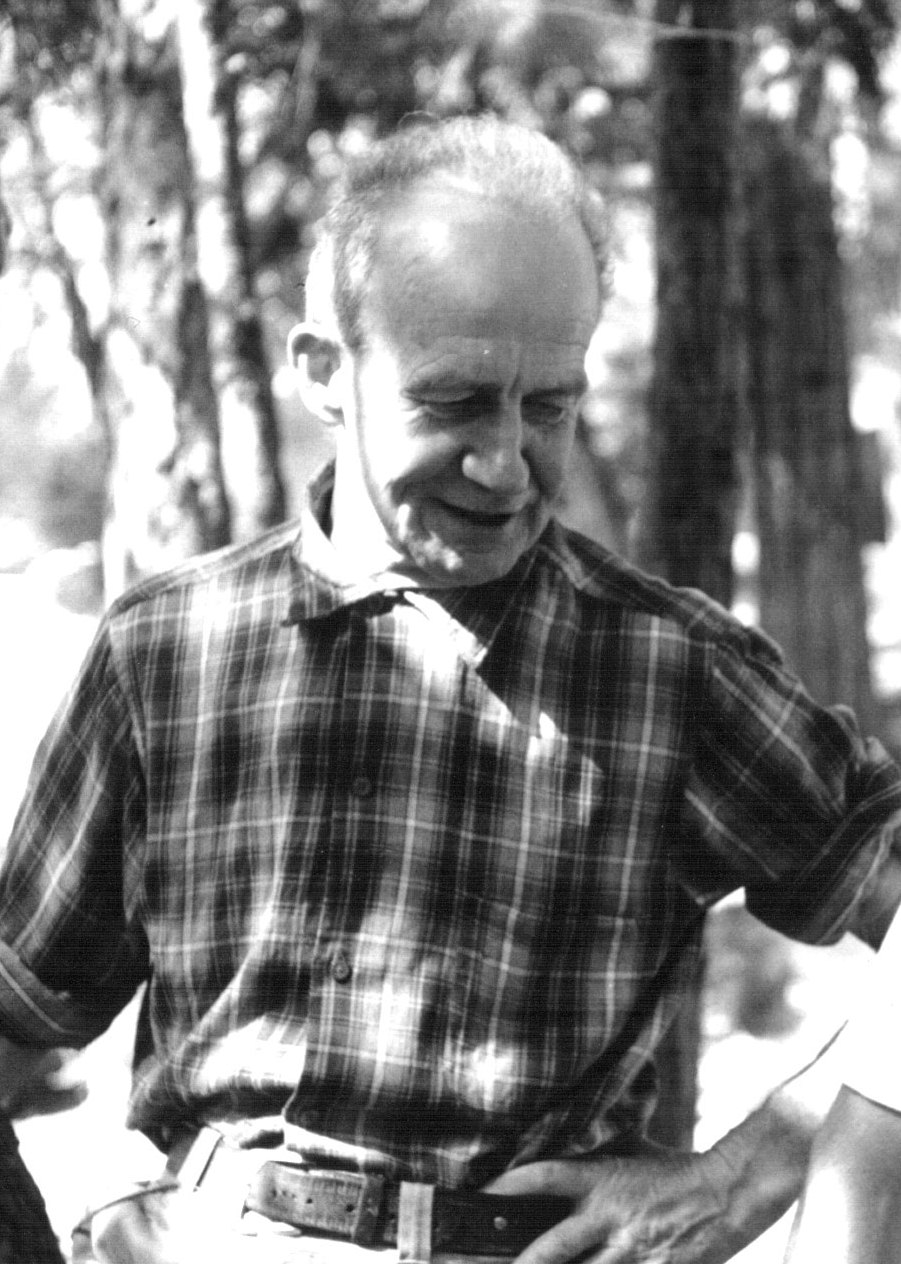
John Salathé

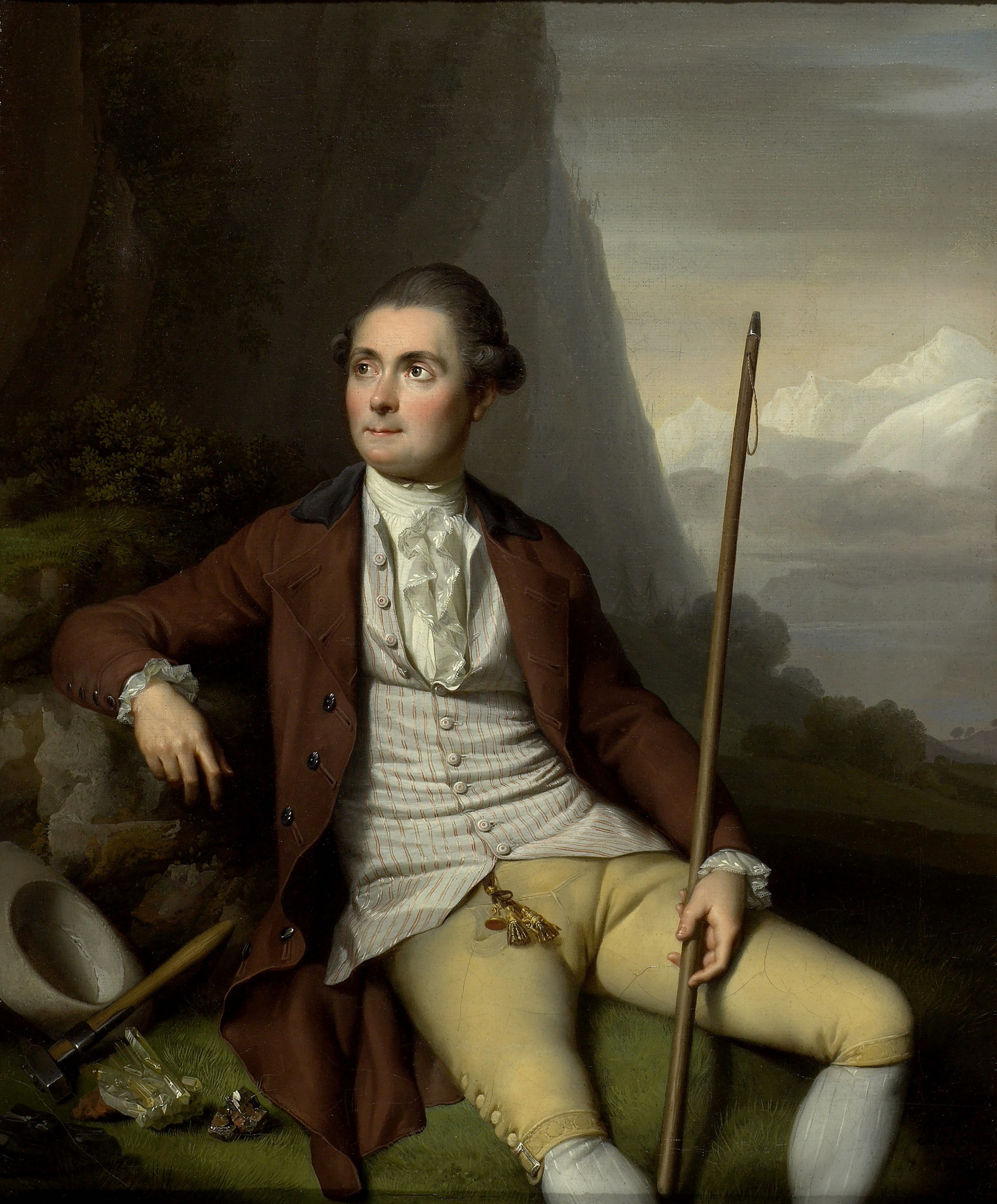
Horace-Bénédict de Saussure

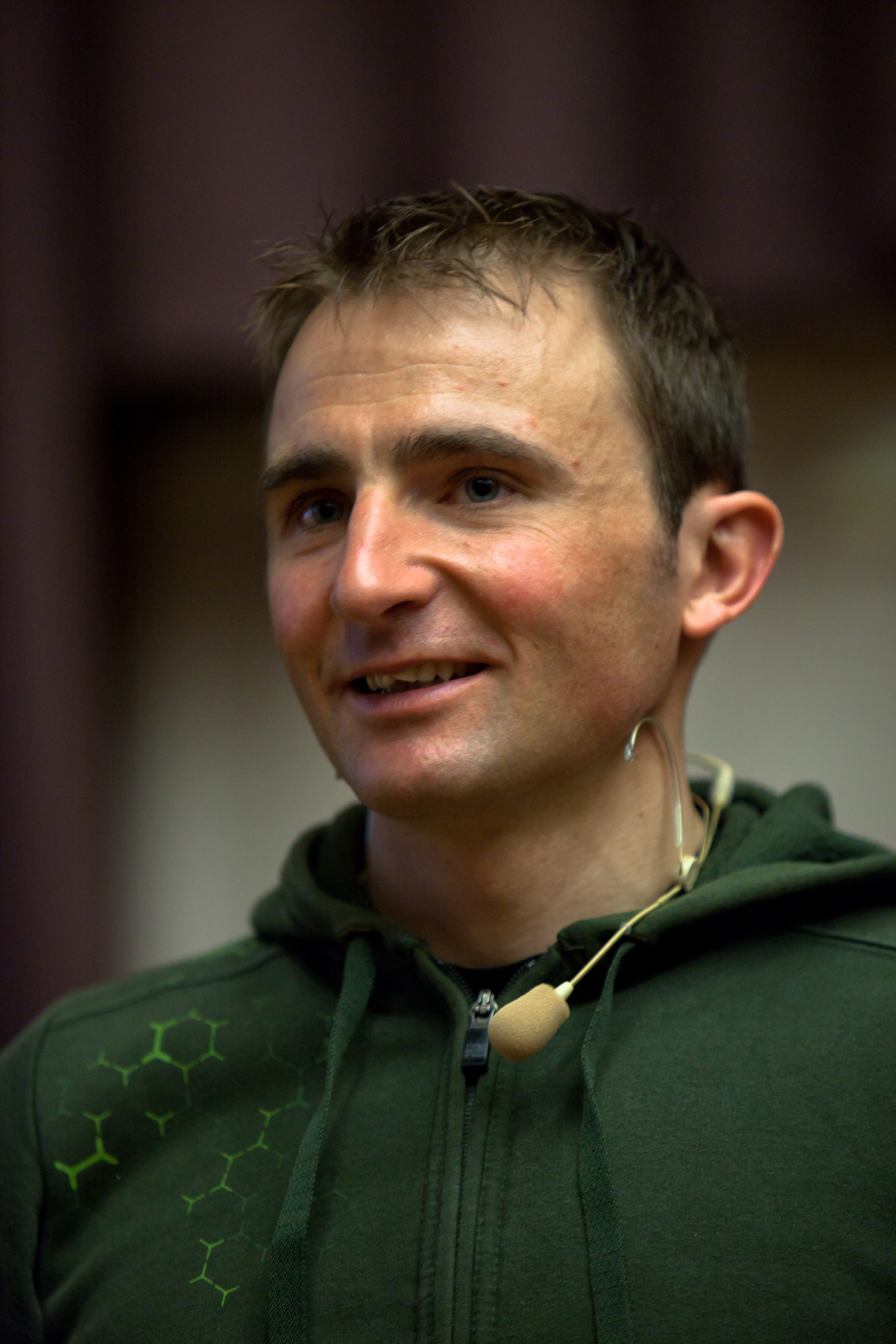
Ueli Steck

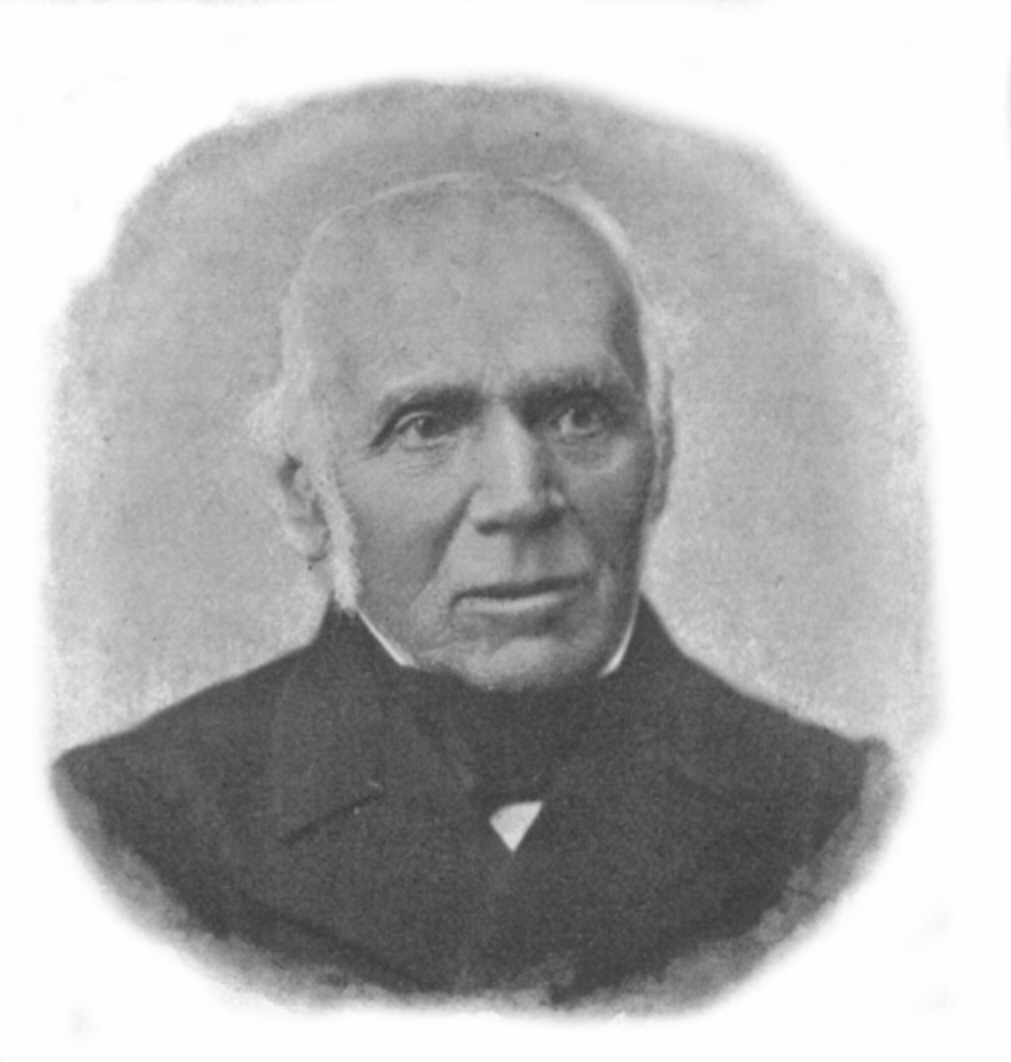
Gottlieb Samuel Studer

- Rosemary Saal (born 1990s), American mountaineer
- Nazir Sabir Gilgit-Baltistan Pakistan, first Pakistani to climb Mount Everest
- Hassan Sadpara (born 1963) Gilgit-Baltistan Pakistan, starting as a high altitude porter, he climbed 5xPakistani 8000ers and Everest, without supplementary oxygen
- Mostafa Salameh (born 1970) Jordan, first Jordanian to summit Everest, and Seven Summits
- John Salathé (1900–1993) Switzerland/US, pioneering Yosemite National Park, inventor of modern piton
- Horace-Bénédict de Saussure (1740–1799) France, third ascent Mont Blanc (1787), funded first ascent
- Marcus Schmuck (1925–2005) Austria, first ascent Broad Peak, first ascent Skil Brum
- Peter Schoening (1927–2004) US, first ascent Gasherbrum I and Vinson Massif, saved five climbers on K2 (1953)
- Peter Sprenger (1953–2018), Liechtenstein, first Liechtensteiner to reach the summit of Mount Everest
- Jakob Schubert (born 1990) Austria, one of the most successful competition climbers in history
- Doug Scott (1941–2020) UK, Seven Summits, first ascent Everest south-west face, Baintha Brakk (descent with broken ankles), Kangchenjunga, Nuptse
- Vittorio Sella (1859–1943) Italy, mountaineer and pioneer photographer
- Nalini Sengupta India, educationist and mountaineer, namesake of Mount Nalini, originally peak 5260 in the Himalayas, near the Hampta Pass region of Manali, Himachal Pradesh
- Chris Sharma (born 1981) US, first to climb consensus 9a+ (5.15a) with Realization/Biographie (2001), and 9b (5.15b) with Jumbo Love (2008).
- John Sherman (born 1959) US, inventor of "V" grading system
- Apa Sherpa (born early 1960s) Nepal, record for most ascents of Everest (20 as of 2010)
- Lhakpa Sherpa (born 1973) Nepal, first woman to summit Everest ten times (2022)
- Pasang Lhamu Sherpa (1961–1993) Nepal, first Nepali woman to climb Everest, died during descent
- Pemba Doma Sherpa (1970–2007) Nepal, first Nepali female mountaineer to climb Everest north face, died on Lhotse
- Pemba Dorje Sherpa (born 1977) Nepal, fastest ascent of Everest (2003)
- Eric Shipton (1907–1977) UK, first ascent Kamet, pioneered route across the Khumbu Glacier
- Ashima Shiraishi (born 2001) US, first female to climb V15 (Horizon, Mount Hiei, Japan)
- William Shockley (1910–1989) US, Nobel Prize-winning physicist, proponent of eugenics, first ascent Shockleys Ceiling in the Gunks (1953)
- Joe Simpson (born 1960) UK, survived a fall on Siula Grande, wrote Touching the Void
- Arunima Sinha India, first Indian amputee to climb Everest
- Todd Skinner (1958–2006) US, rock climber, first free ascent Salathe Wall, died on Leaning Tower
- Cecilie Skog (born 1974) Norway, first female to climb Seven Summits and both Poles, Everest and K2
- Laurie Skreslet (born 1949) Canada, first Canadian to summit Everest (1982)
- William Cecil Slingsby (1849–1929) UK, first ascent Store Skagastølstind (1876), pioneer of Norwegian mountaineering
- Frank Smythe (1900–1949) UK, first ascent Kamet (1931) with Shipton, R. Holdsworth and Lewa Sherpa, reached 8565m on Everest in 1933 without supplementary oxygen
- Dermot Somers Ireland, climber, author and broadcaster
- Carlos Soria Fontán (born 1939) Spain, the only mountaineer to have ascended nine mountains of more than 8,000 meters after turning 60 years old
- Jaahnavi Sriperambuduru (born 2001) India.
- William Grant Stairs (1863–1892) Canada, first non-African to climb in the Ruwenzoris
- Allen Steck (1926–2023) US, mountaineer and rock climber
- Ueli Steck (1976–2017) Switzerland, soloed Eiger north face in 2:22:50 hours (2015)
- Leslie Stephen (1832–1904) UK, author and alpinist, first ascent Schreckhorn, Monte Disgrazia, Zinalrothorn
- Fritz Steuri (1879–1950) Switzerland, skier and mountain guide; first ascent of Mittellegigrat (northeast ridge of Eiger) (1921)
- Edward Lisle Strutt (1874–1948) UK, deputy leader on 1922 Everest expedition, outspoken Alpine Journal editor, 1927–37
- Gottlieb Samuel Studer (1804–1890) Switzerland, first ascent Wildhorn (1843), founding member of Swiss Alpine Club
- Satyarup Siddhanta (born 1983) India, climbed Mont Blanc, climbed 6 of the 7 summits, climbed Mt Everest on 21 May 2016

== T ==
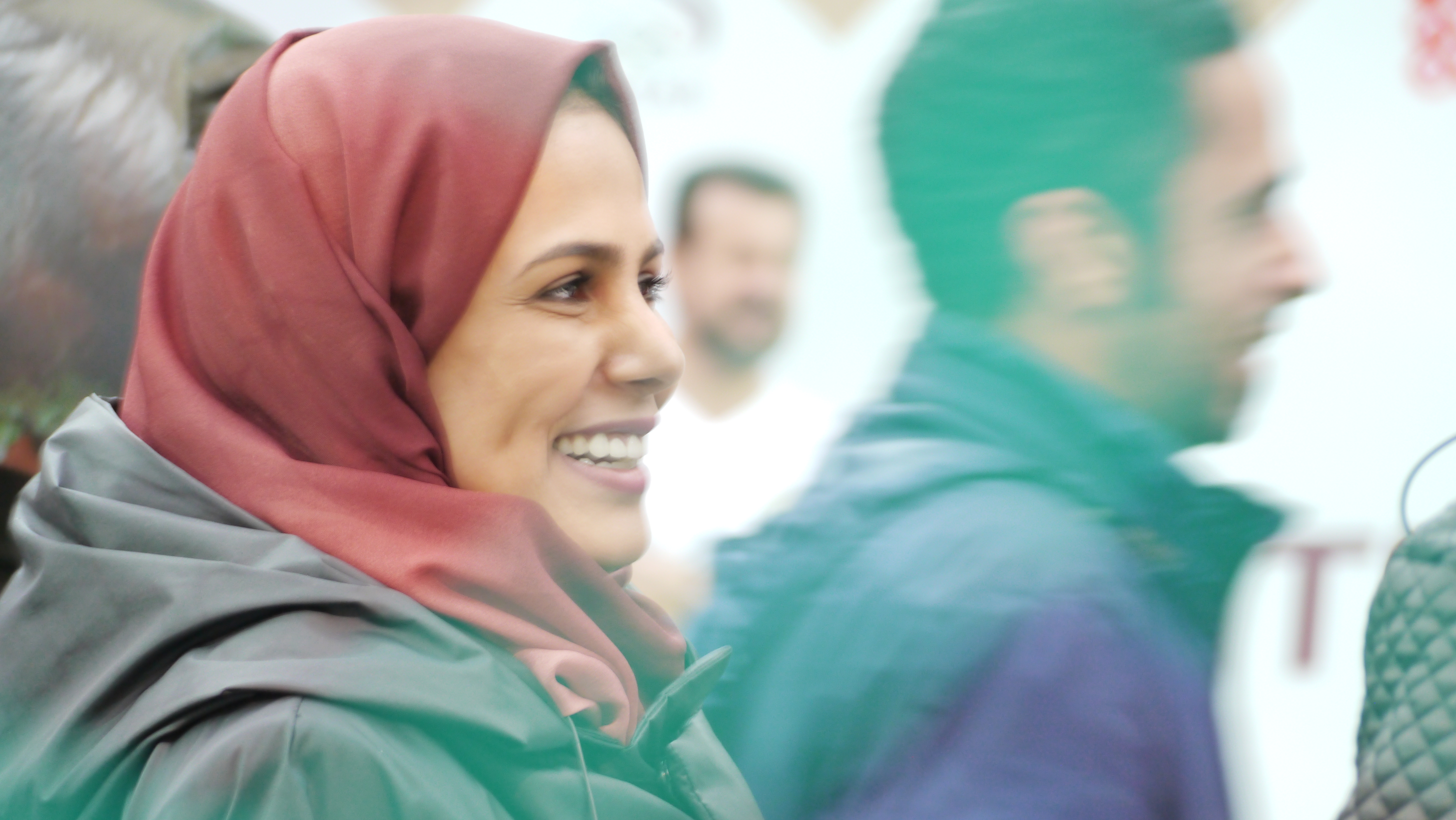
Sheikha Asma Al Thani

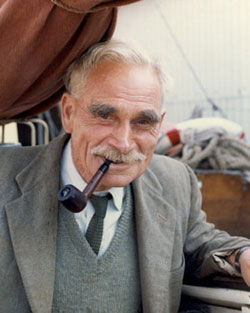
Bill Tilman

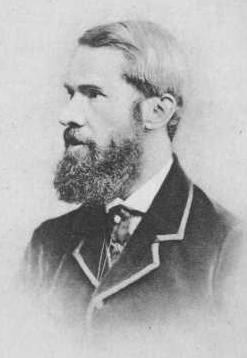
Francis Fox Tuckett

- Junko Tabei (1939–2016) Japan, first female ascent Everest; first completion of Bass and Messner's Seven Summits
- Kei Taniguchi (1972–2015) Japan, first female winner of the Piolet d'Or in 2009
- Joe Tasker (1948–1982) UK, Dunagiri, Kanchenjunga, Changabang West Wall; died on Everest (May 1982)
- Asma Al Thani first Qatari woman to ascend Everest and Ama Dablam; first Arab to summit an eight-thousander without oxygen
- Vernon Tejas (born 1953) US, first solo winter ascent Denali, Seven Summits time world record
- Lionel Terray (1921–1965) France, first ascents Fitz Roy, Chakrarahu, Jannu and Makalu on the 1955 French Makalu expedition; second ascent Eiger north face (1947)
- Vladislav Terzyul (1953–2004) Ukraine, disputed claim to have climbed all eight-thousanders
- Kevin Thaw (born 1967) UK, ascents in Himalayas and Yosemite
- Herbert Tichy (1912–1987) Austrian, first ascent Cho Oyu (1954)
- Bill Tilman (1898–1977) UK, explorer, climbed in Africa and Himalaya, first ascent Nanda Devi (1936)
- Henry Todd (1945-2025) UK, drug dealer, mountaineer and expedition organiser
- Luis Trenker (1892–1990) Italy, mountaineer, film director and writer
- Sonnie Trotter (born 1979) Canada, award-winning climber, known for hard trad climbing
- Francis Fox Tuckett (1834–1913) UK, first ascent Aletschhorn (1859)
- Julie Tullis (1939–1986) UK, Broad Peak (1984) and K2 (1986); died on descent from K2
- Mark Twight (born 1962) US, advocate of "light and fast" style of mountaineering
- John Tyndall (1820–1893) UK, early attempts on Matterhorn, first ascent Weisshorn (1861)

== U ==
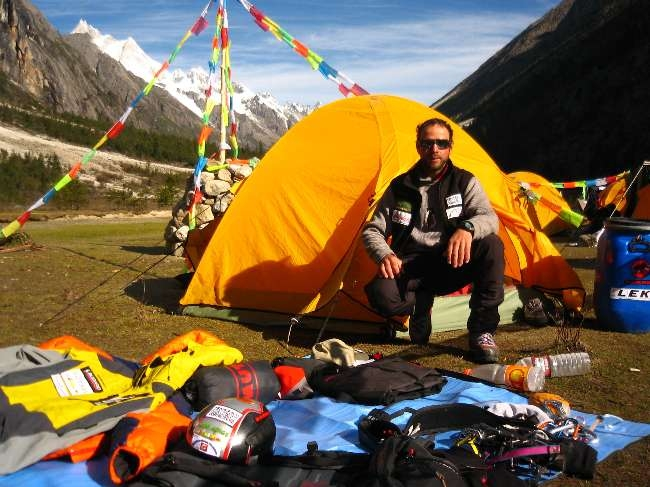
Karl Unterkircher

- Naomi Uemura (1941–1984) Japan, first solo winter ascent Denali, on which he died
- James Ramsey Ullman (1908–1971) US, author and mountaineer
- Ugur Uluocak (1962–2003) Turkey, mountaineer, photographer and editor, died on Mount Alarcha in Kyrgyzstan
- Um Hong-Gil (born 1960) South Korea, 9th person to climb all eight-thousanders, first to climb 16 highest peaks
- Willi Unsoeld (1926–1979) US, first ascent Everest west ridge (1963), died on Mount Rainier (1979)
- Karl Unterkircher (1970–2008) Italy, Everest and K2 in the same year without oxygen, died on Nanga Parbat
- Denis Urubko (born 1973) Kazakhstan, 14x8000er; first winter ascents of Makalu and Gasherbrum II, Snow Leopard award winner

== V ==
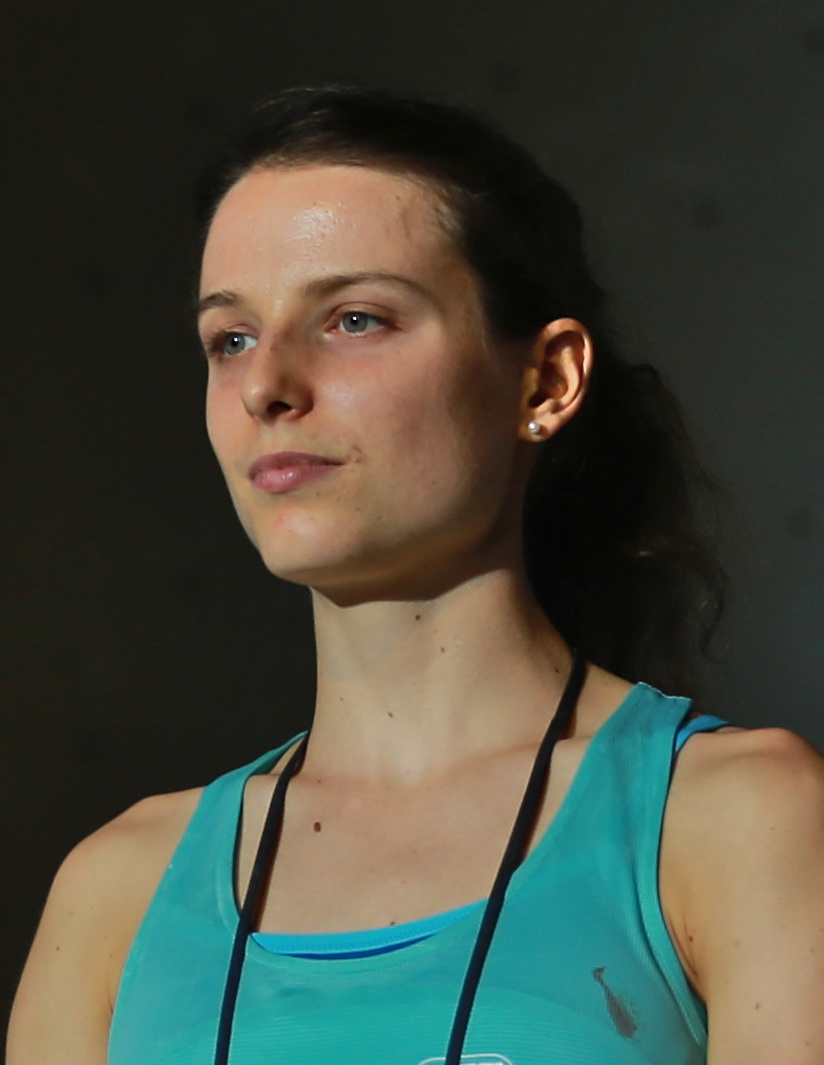
Anak Verhoeven

- Arjun Vajpai (born 1993) India, climbed Everest 2010, Lhotse 2011 and Manaslu 2011
- Ivan Vallejo (born 1959) Ecuador, 14th person to climb all eight-thousanders (7th without supplemental oxygen)
- Patrick Vallençant (1946–1989) France, alpinist/skier and ski mountaineering pioneer
- Anak Verhoeven (born 1996) Belgium, first woman to claim a first ascent of a 5.15a
- Allison Vest (born 1995) Canada, two-time Canadian Bouldering Nationals champion
- Ed Viesturs (born 1959) US, first US climber to climb all eight-thousander (6th without supplemental oxygen)
- Sibusiso Vilane (born 1970) South Africa, first black African to summit Everest (2003)
- Ludwig Vörg (1911–1941) Germany, first ascent Eiger north face (1938)

== W ==
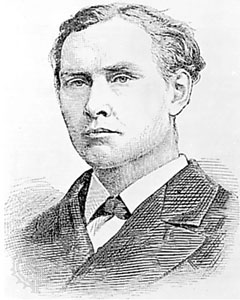
Edward Whymper

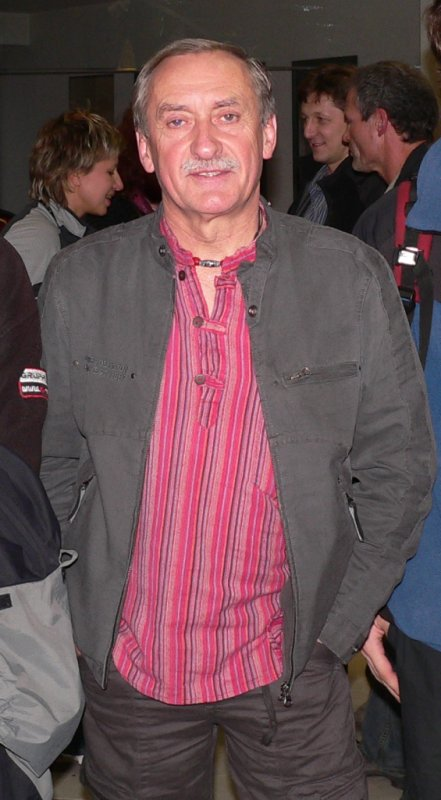
Krzysztof Wielicki

- Horace Walker (1838–1908) UK, first ascent Mount Elbrus, Grandes Jorasses, Barre des Ecrins, Obergabelhorn
- Lucy Walker (1836–1916) UK, first female ascent Matterhorn (1871)
- Barbara Washburn US, first ascent Mount Bertha, first female ascent Denali (1947)
- Bradford Washburn (1910–2007) US, third ascent Denali, pioneered west buttress route
- Ryan Waters (born 1973) US, first American to complete unsupported North and South Poles
- Don Whillans (1933–1985) UK, first ascent Annapurna south face (1970)
- Rick White (1946–2004) Australia, rock climber, developed Frog Buttress (1968)
- Jim Whittaker (1929–2026) US, first US ascent Everest (1963)
- Lou Whittaker (1929–2024) US, Rainier guide
- Pete Whittaker (born 1991) UK, first free ascent of Century Crack 5.14b (8c)
- Edward Whymper (1840–1911) UK, first ascent Matterhorn (1865), first ascent Chimborazo (1880)
- Jim Wickwire (born 1940) US, K2 (1978) (bivouacked near summit)
- Krzysztof Wielicki (born 1950) Poland, first winter ascent Everest; fifth person to climb all eight-thousanders
- Karl Wien (1906–1937) Germany, leader of unsuccessful Nanga Parbat expedition (1937)
- Fritz Wiessner (1900–1988) US, born Dresden, emigrated to US; pioneer of free climbing; K2 expedition (1939)
- Sydney Wignall (1922–2012) UK, Climbed Gurla Mandhata in 1955
- Walter Wilcox (1869–1949) Canadian Rockies explorer
- Martyn S. Williams (born 1947) UK, first person to lead expeditions to South Pole (1989), North Pole (1992) and Mount Everest (1991)
- George Willig (born 1949) US, climbed South Tower of World Trade Center
- Fritz Wintersteller (1927–2018) Austria, first ascent Broad Peak (1957) and Skil Brum (1957)
- Ian Woodall (born 1956) UK, climbed Everest several times
- Daniel Woods (born 1989) USA, climbed world's hardest boulder problem, Flash (V15) in 2011
- Fanny Bullock Workman (1859–1925) US, geographer, cartographer, and mountaineer, notably in the Himalayas

== Y ==
- Santosh Yadav (born 1969) India, Indo-Tibetan Border Police woman, climbed Everest twice (1992 and 1993)
- Simon Yates (born 1963) UK, Joe Simpson's partner on west face of Siula Grande (1985), subject of Touching the Void
- Michael J. Ybarra (1966–2012) US, climber and writer, extreme sports correspondent for The Wall Street Journal 2007–2012
- Wang Yongfeng (born 1963) China, first Chinese couple to climb Seven Summits (with Li Zhixin)
- Ichiro Yoshizawa (1903–1998) Japan, climber and writer; K2 (1977)
- Geoffrey Winthrop Young (1876–1958) UK, first ascent Täschhorn south face, Weisshorn west ridge, Grandes Jorasses traverse

== Z ==
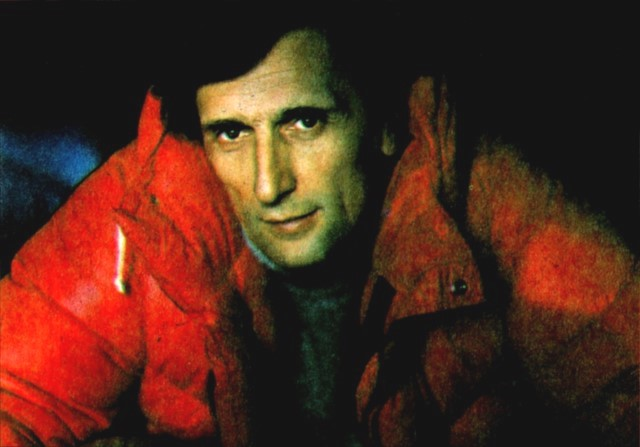
Andrzej Zawada

- Andrzej Zawada (1928–2000) Poland, pioneer of winter Himalayism
- Li Zhixin (born 1962) China, half of first Chinese couple to climb the Seven Summits with Wang Yongfeng
- Emil Zsigmondy (1861–1885) Austria, physician and mountain climber; died trying to force new route on the Meije
- Jerzy Żuławski (1874–1915) Polish literary figure, philosopher, translator and alpinist
- Juliusz Żuławski (1910–1999) Polish poet, prose writer, literary critic, translator and climber; son of Jerzy Żuławski
- Marek Żuławski (1908–1985) Polish painter, graphic artist, author and climber; son of Jerzy Żuławski
- Wawrzyniec Żuławski (1916–1957) Polish composer, music critic and teacher; died during Mont Blanc rescue mission; son of Jerzy Żuławski
- Matthias Zurbriggen (1856–1917) Switzerland, first ascent Aconcagua (1897)

== See also ==
- History of rock climbing
- List of grade milestones in rock climbing
- List of 20th-century summiters of Mount Everest
