= Dobrosława Miodowicz-Wolf =

Polish mountaineer

- Born: 18 August 1953; Kraków
- Died: 10 August 1986 (aged 32); K2
- Cause of death: Exhaustion
- Body discovered: 1987, 7100 m on K2
- Monuments: Memorial of Polish Himalayan Mountaineers, Namche Bazaar, Nepal
- Education: Jagiellonian University
- Occupations: Ethnographer, alpinist
- Years active: 1970–1986
- Employer: National Museum of Ethnography
- Spouse: Jan Wolf
- Children: Łukasz Wolf
- Parent(s): Alfred Miodowicz, Zyta Miodowicz
- Relatives: Konstanty Miodowicz (brother)

Dobrosława "Dobrusia" "Mrówka" Miodowicz-Wolf (18 August 1953 — 10 August 1986) was a Polish alpinist, mountaineer, ethnographer, and researcher at Poland's National Museum of Ethnography. She was the daughter of politician and trade union activist Alfred Miodowicz, sister of politician Konstanty Miodowicz, and the wife of mountaineer Jan Wolf. She died in the Karakorum on the descent from the summit of K2.

As a child, Miodowicz-Wolf would borrow books from the library by Polish alpinist Wawrzyniec Żuławski, and was inspired by his Tatra trilogy of mountain ascents. She would go on to become a mountaineering instructor and trainer. Because of her small stature and strength as a climber, she became known by the nickname "ant" (in Polish: Mrówka).

== Mountaineering ==
=== Tatras Mountains ===
Inspired by Żuławski's stories, Miodowicz-Wolf began climbing at 16, first gaining experience across routes in the High Tatras. Across this range she made a number of notable climbs and forged new routes and winter ascents from 1972 to 1976 including Lomnický štít and Ľadový štít. She met her future husband Jan Wolf in a mountain shelter in the Tatras.

=== Alps ===
In 1976, she began climbing in the Alps with her husband Jan as her climbing partner. That year, she climbed Mont Blanc, and then climbed the north-west face of Monte Civetta in the Dolomites. In 1978, she climbed the north face of the Aiguille Verte, as well as the Route Major route on the east face of Mont Blanc. The next year, she completed the Guides' Route on the north face of the Petit Dru, the south face of Marmolada, and Via Paolo VI on Tofana di Mezzo.

=== High Mountains ===
In 1980, Miodowicz-Wolf summited her first 7,000m peak, Peak Ozodi in the Pamir Range (7105 m). Three years later, she summited Ismoil Somoni Peak (7,495 m). At this time she became the climbing partner of Wanda Rutkiewicz, the first European woman to summit Mount Everest.

She was invited on a Polish women's expedition to the Himalayas in 1982, but was unable to go as she was pregnant with her son Łukasz.

In 1984, she finally headed to the Himalayas as part of a Polish women's expedition to K2. She had to abandon her summit attempt at 7,350 m before returning to base camp.

In 1985, she joined Wanda Rutkiewicz, Krystyna Palmowska, and Anna Czerwińska for an attempt at summiting Nanga Parbat. The rest of the team waited at camp IV as Miodowicz-Wolf made a solo attempt at the summit, reaching 8,050 m before having to turn back, just 50 meters shy of the summit. It was her first time reaching over 8,000 m without oxygen.

==== Final ascent ====
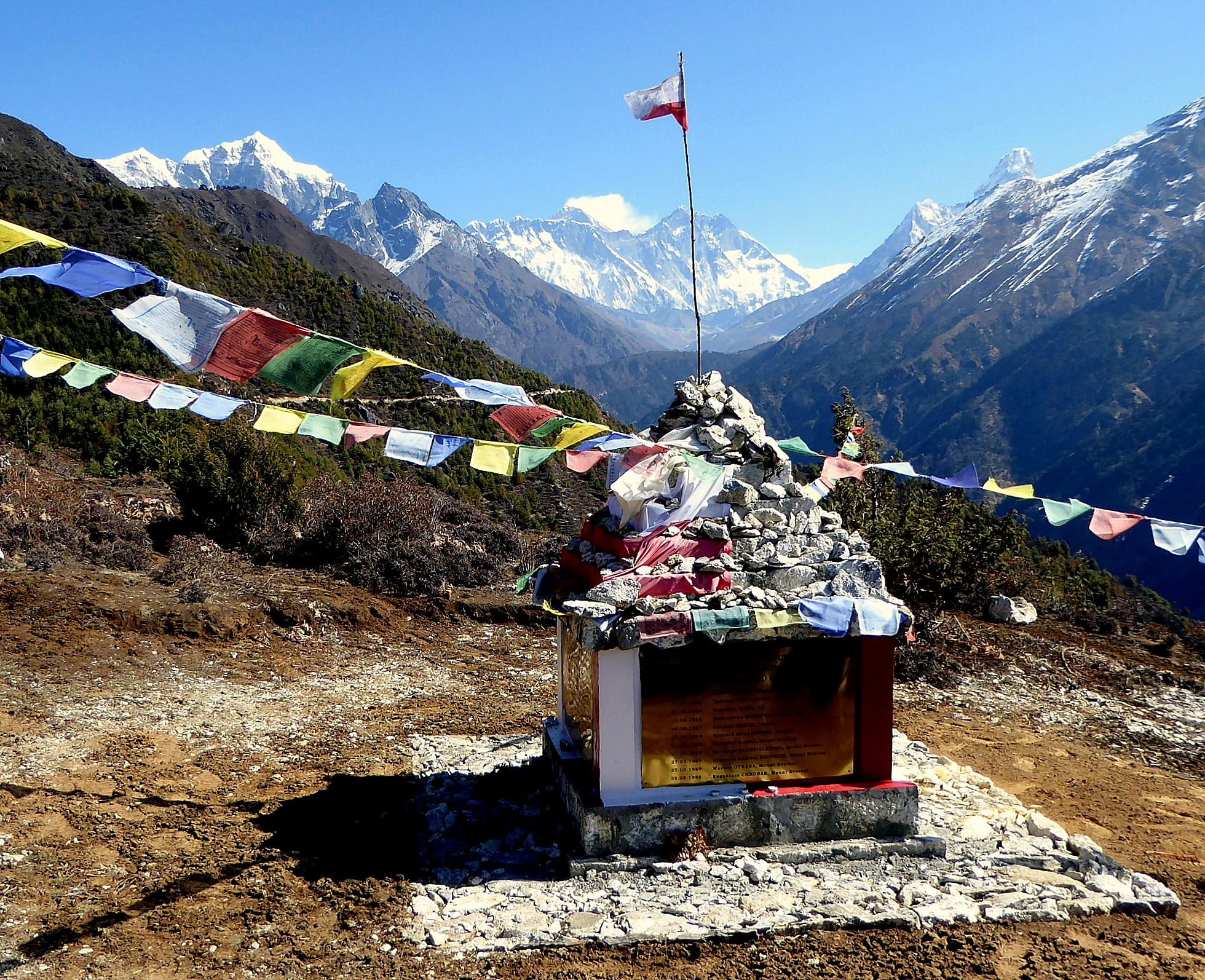
Memorial of Polish Himalayan Mountaineers in Namche Bazaar, Nepal

In 1986, she returned to K2. Originally part of a women's team, she decided to join Alan Rouse, a member of an English expedition on an attempt at the summit. The pair begin their climb from base camp on 29 July. Over the course of her climb, Miodowicz-Wolf ultimately reached 8,500 m, 150 m from the summit. As she began to descend along the Abruzzi Spur, the weather began to turn, and a severe storm trapped all climbers on the mountain in what was later termed the 1986 K2 disaster. Only two climbers facing the mountain that day, Austrians Kurt Diemberger and Willi Bauer, would survive.

The storm trapped Miodowicz-Wolf in camp IV above 7,600 m for six days. It was not until 10 August that the weather cleared sufficiently to allow a further descent from the camp. However, Miodowicz-Wolf ultimately died of exhaustion at 7,100 m, between camps II and III. The 1986 season on K2 was particularly dangerous, ultimately resulting in the loss of 13 climbers, including fellow Poles Tadeusz Piotrowski and Wojciech Wróż.

The following year, Dobrosława Miodowicz-Wolf's body was found by a Japanese-Pakistani team on K2 and buried at the foot of the mountain.

In 2019, her name was inscribed on the Memorial of Polish Himalayan Mountaineers monument in Namche Bazaar, Nepal.

== In film ==
In 2001, director Anna Teresa Pietraszek made a documentary about Dobrosławie Miodowicz-Wolf, "For the Price of Life" (In Polish: Za cenę życia) for Telewizja Polska.

In 2015, Miodowicz-Wolf's son Łukasz was featured in K2: Touching the Sky, alongside Hannah (daughter of Tadeusz Piotrowski) and Chris and Lindsay (children of Julie Tullis), children of climbers who were killed in the Himalayas in 1986. The film showcases footage of her climbs as well as Łukasz's reaction to her decision to climb while he was a young child.
