= False Summit: Gender in Mountaineering Nonfiction =

2021 book by Julie Rak

- Cover
- Author: Julie Rak
- Language: English
- Subject: Gender in literature; Mountaineering in literature; Expedition narratives
- Genre: Literary criticism
- Publisher: McGill-Queen's University Press
- Publication date: April 14, 2021
- Publication place: Canada
- Media type: Print (hardcover, paperback), e-book
- Pages: 272
- ISBN: 978-0-2280-0627-5 (paperback)
- Dewey Decimal: 809/.9336
- LC Class: PN56.M7 R35 2021

False Summit: Gender in Mountaineering Nonfiction is a 2021 book by Canadian scholar Julie Rak. The book investigates how gender identity and politics have shaped mountaineering literature, based on expedition narratives about high-altitude climbing in the Himalayas and the Karakoram. Organized around three peaks—Annapurna, K2, and Mount Everest—the study analyzes canonical texts such as Maurice Herzog's Annapurna (1951), Arlene Blum's Annapurna: A Woman's Place (1980), and Jon Krakauer's Into Thin Air (1997), arguing that debates over climbing styles and leadership function as a "bodily politics" reflecting assumptions about which climbers are considered authentic. The title refers to a mountaineering term for a lesser peak mistaken for the true summit, used as a metaphor for the barriers faced by women, non-white climbers, and others whose achievements have been overlooked or dismissed within dominant narratives of mountaineering history.

== Summary ==
Rak opens the book with an image of Bolivia's cholita climbers, Indigenous Aymara women who climb mountains in traditional skirts and shawls, using them to illustrate how narrow conceptions of who can be a mountaineer have historically excluded certain climbers from recognition. The introduction establishes her central argument that mountaineering literature has long been defined by a version of masculinity emphasizing mastery of the body, the environment, and others, and that debates over climbing styles and leadership function as a form of "bodily politics" reflecting assumptions about which bodies are suited for the activity.

From there, the book is organized around three peaks rather than chronologically. The first chapter focuses on Annapurna, analyzing Maurice Herzog's 1951 account of the French expedition that made the first ascent of an 8,000-metre peak, Chris Bonington's 1970 expedition narrative, and Arlene Blum's Annapurna: A Woman's Place (1980), the account of the first female-led expedition to summit an 8,000-metre peak. Rak presents Blum's text as the most sustained discussion of gender politics in any expedition account while also noting its limitations regarding race and Sherpa culture, and documents the backlash the expedition faced from male climbers.

The second chapter examines K2 through the concept of "the brotherhood of the rope," a phrase associated with the 1953 American expedition that came to symbolize masculine heroism among climbers. Rak traces how women who joined K2 expeditions in the 1970s and 1980s, including Wanda Rutkiewicz and Julie Tullis, faced sexism and were viewed as threats to team cohesion. She offers an extended reading of Kurt Diemberger's The Endless Knot (1991) as presenting an alternative to the masculinist brotherhood ideal.

The third and fourth chapters center on Mount Everest. The third chapter traces the mythology surrounding George Mallory. She argues that following the 1999 discovery of his body, he became the archetypal figure representing who belongs on the mountain. In the fourth chapter, she critiques Jon Krakauer's Into Thin Air (1997), challenging his portrayal of climbing authenticity and arguing that his account minimized the roles played by female climbers such as Lene Gammelgaard while framing the mountain's commercialization and diversification as evidence of decline. Rak believes that while mountaineering culture remains male-dominated, counter-narratives offer possibilities for understanding gender on Everest not as a sign of decline but of change.

== Critical reception ==
Peter H. Hansen considered the book as the most important work on gender and mountaineering in many years. Hansen praised the analysis of how bodily politics in Himalayan mountaineering marks the bodies of climbers indirectly through debates over leadership and climbing styles.

Peter L. Bayers found the work to be strong and well-argued. Bayers praised its accessible prose and Rak's storytelling, recommending the book to climbers and general readers alike. His one criticism: much of Rak's analysis of Everest and gender politics (the 1920s British expeditions, Mallory's symbolic significance, Krakauer's Into Thin Air) overlaps with arguments from his own Imperial Ascent (2003), which she never cites or engages with.

Pierre-Olaf Schut considered Rak's approach original in its emphasis on reading mountaineers' lived experience through accounts of ascents and films made in the Himalayas and Karakoram. Rather than focusing on women's narratives alone, Rak first reinterprets canonical texts by male authors, then draws out parallels and contrasts with female mountaineers' accounts. Schut also highlighted her analysis of how values like leadership and brotherhood shift alongside changing climbing techniques—from the siege-style expeditions of the 1950s to modern lightweight ascents.

Denisa Krásná called the book pivotal for lifewriting studies, praising how it reveals mountaineering "success" as a social construct shaped by hypermasculine narratives rather than any objective measure. Krásná highlighted Rak's examination of sovereignty, colonialism, and capitalism through Annapurna, K2, and Everest, as well as her argument that writing about climbing is not peripheral but central to climbing identity itself.

In her review, the Slovene historian Julija Šuligoj considered the book a masterful overview of psychological, anthropological, and post-structural perspectives on alpinism. Šuligoj noticed that Rak covered the history of high-altitude climbing from the first attempts on 8,000-metre peaks through the late 1990s while maintaining focus on gender, sexism, and masculinity. She found that the descriptions of life stories belonging to significant names in women's alpinism made these figures more relevant to contemporary readers. Šuligoj thought that the work opens critical territory for further research across various related fields.
