= Carlos Carsolio =

Mexican mountain climber

Personal information
- Born: 4 October 1962 (age 64) Mexico City
- Occupations: Mountaineering, motivational speaker, entrepreneur.
- Spouse: Elsa Ávila (divorced)
- Children: Karina and Santiago
- Website: http://www.carsolio.com.mx

Climbing career
- Type of climber: High-altitude climbing; Alpine climbing; Big wall climbing

Carlos Carsolio Larrea (born 4 October 1962 in Mexico City) is a Mexican mountaineer, alpinist and rock climber, who is known for being the fourth person (and first non-European) to climb the world's 14 eight-thousanders, all of them without supplemental oxygen (although, he required emergency oxygen on his descent from Makalu in 1988).

== Early years ==
Carsolio, the eldest of seven children, was introduced to mountaineering by his mother. When she was pregnant, she climbed Iztaccíhuatl (5,220 meters) despite her doctor's recommendations. Carsolio admired climber Hermann Buhl in his youth, and later Lynn Hill, Peter Croft and Jerzy Kukuczka.

His first ascents were in Mexico, the Pico de Orizaba and Popocatépetl. In the early 1980s Carsolio climbed the big wall climbing route known as The Nose on El Capitan in Yosemite, California.

At age 22, Carsolio climbed Reinhold Messner's difficult south face route of Aconcagua, the highest peak in South America at 6,962 meters (22,841 feet). He traveled to Patagonia in 1990 with his friend Andrés Delgado to make the first Mexican ascent of Cerro Torre, considered by experts as the world's most difficult mountain for its great granite wall of at least 800 meters (2,600 feet), no matter what path climbers seek to attack. In 1991 Carsolio and Delgado climbed on Baffin Island, Canada where they accomplished the first Mexican summit.

== Eight-thousanders ==
Carsolio climbed his first eight-thousander with Jerzy Kukuczka; considered one of the strongest high-altitude climbers in the world. They climbed Nanga Parbat on 13 July 1985, with a Polish expedition, led by Pawel Mularz.

Carsolio summited Shishapangma with Elsa Ávila, Ramíro Navarrete, Ryszard Warecki and Wanda Rutkiewicz, and being the first to traverse the sharp snow arête from the Central Summit to the Main Summit. Carsolio and Ávila were the first Mexicans to reach that peak, for Navarrete would be the first Ecuadorian eight-thousander on 18 July 1987.

His solo ascension of Makalu on 12 October 1988 was the third eight-thousander in Carsolio's career. He required rescue and emergency oxygen on the descent.

On 13 October 1989, Carsolio headed a Mexican expedition to make summit on Mount Everest by the southeast route without the aid of bottled oxygen. This was a pending account with the mountain, months before with Elsa Ávila; they had to abort the mission because his partner got severe pulmonary edema only 92 meters (302 feet), from the summit. They were forced to retreat. Elsa would summit Everest 10 years later. However, on 16 May, his countryman, Ricardo Torres-Nava, reached the mountaintop to become the first Mexican and Latin American to do so, with supplementary oxygen on an American expedition. 1989 was a particularly hard year on Everest. Sherpas saw it as a "dark year" because of 24 people who reached the summit, 8 died during the descent.

On 12 May 1992, Carsolio made the summit of Kangchenjunga climbing solo. Wanda Rutkiewicz began the ascent with Carlos at 3:30 am on 12 May from camp IV, located at 7,950 meters (26,080 feet). After a dozen hours of climbing under heavy snowfall, Carsolio reached the top, becoming the only climber to do so that year. On his descent, between 8,200 and 8,300 meters (26,900 and 27,200 ft), Carsolio encountered Rutkiewicz. Although she had no food, she decided to bivouac and attempt the summit the next day. Carsolio was exhausted and could not convince her to descend with him, and she was never seen again.

The sixth eight-thousander for Carsolio was K2 on 13 June 1993, considered by many climbers the most difficult peak in the world.

On 26 April 1994, Carsolio reached the summit of Cho Oyu, establishing a speed record: ascent from base camp in 18 hours and 45 minutes.

On 13 May 1994, Carsolio set a new speed record on Lhotse, with a climb of 23 hours and 50 minutes from base camp to the summit. This was Carsolio's eighth solo eight-thousander.

On 9 July 1994 Carlos reached the summit solo of Broad Peak, establishing a new route on the west face of the mountain, now known as The Carsolio Route. Carsolio called it his most successful climb. With that, he became only the fifth person to establish a new solo route of an eight-thousander.

Carsolio ended that year, 1994, with two world records set in just 17 days, a new route with his name and three more eight-thousanders in his statistics.

1995 was the most productive year for Carsolio. He conquered Annapurna on 25 April, Dhaulagiri on 15 May, Gasherbrum II on 4 July and Gasherbrum I on 15 July. This left only Manaslu on his list. Carlos tried Manaslu with Kukuczka in 1986, but failed at that time with principles of freezing on fingers and toes, and nearly lost his life on this expedition in an attempt of a new route.

On 12 May 1996, Carlos and his younger brother, Alfredo, made the summit of Manaslu in alpine style. For Carlos was his long-awaited fourteenth and final eight-thousander. Manaslu is characterized by bad weather. The ascent of Manaslu by the Carsolios had a serious setback at 200 meters (660 feet), from the summit; the climbers found that a strong storm was approaching from the Annapurna and Dhaulagiri. They calculated that the storm would arrive in a couple of hours, just when they were touching the mountaintop. The international media pressure was enormous, and Carlos never made an expedition so well prepared, equipped and funded. But to survive they made the right decision, to turn back. Fortunately the storm was not as high, at around 7,300 meters (24,000 feet). Although the brothers had to dig an ice cave for shelter.

After a week of recovery they tried again, and a few days later the Carsolios finally reached the summit. The objective was accomplished; Carlos Carsolio got his 14th eight-thousander. Headlines of the feat spread all around the world.

== Eight-thousander ascents ==
Peak	Year	Notes
Nanga Parbat	1985	
Shishapangma	1987	
Makalu	1988	Solo; required emergency oxygen on descent
Mount Everest	1989	
Kangchenjunga	1992	Solo
K2	1993	
Cho Oyu	1994	Solo; summitted from base camp in 18 hours and 45 minutes, a world record
Lhotse	1994	Solo; another world record, achieved in 23 hours and 50 minutes
Broad Peak	1994	Solo, new route; fifth man ever to solo a new route on an eight-thousander
Annapurna	1995	
Dhaulagiri	1995	Solo
Gasherbrum II	1995	
Gasherbrum I	1995	
Manaslu	1996	

== See also ==
- List of 20th-century summiters of Mount Everest

== Notes ==
- His innovating approach and his focus in the opening of new routes have placed him among the best mountaineers of all times.
- He's also well known for his climbing achievements as well as being a leader of small and successful expeditions.
- Carsolio climbs in Alpine style, with no fixed ropes or supplementary oxygen.
- Carsolio currently lives at Valle de Bravo, a small town located approximately 156 km (97 mi), southwest of Mexico City.
- He is also a trained paraglider and a motivational speaker.
- During his climb of Kangchenjunga, he became the last person to see Wanda Rutkiewicz alive.
- Due to his great physical strength his friend Jerzy Kukuczka gave him the nickname of The Mexican bull of the Himalayas.
- He was married to Elsa Ávila who ascends to Mount Everest on 5 May 1999 by the southeast route. Elsa was the first Mexican and Latin American woman to accomplish the feat. They have two children, Karina and Santiago. Carlos divorced Elsa, remarried and had two more children, Camila and Kórel.
- His countrymen Andrés Delgado and Alfonso de la Parra, are officially missing in Changabang since May 2006. Carsolio collaborated in the search of his friends which was unsuccessful.
