= Barrard =

Barrard is a surname. Notable people with the surname include:

- John Barrard (1924–2013), English actor
- Liliane and Maurice Barrard (1940s–1986), French mountaineering couple
