= Ginette Harrison =

British mountain climber (1958–1999)

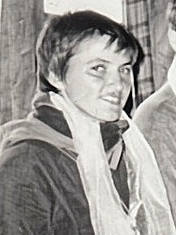
- Born: 28 February 1958
- Died: 24 October 1999 (aged 41); Dhaulagiri, Kingdom of Nepal
- Occupation: Physician
- Known for: Climbing high altitude mountains; First woman to summit Kangchenjunga

Ginette Harrison (28 February 1958 – 24 October 1999) was a British climber and physician.

She studied medicine at the University of Bristol and later specialized in high altitude medicine. At age 25 she climbed Denali, the highest mountain in North America. It was the first of her series of climbs of the highest peaks on all seven continents, which included Mount Everest on 7 October 1993, making her only the second British woman to climb Everest, after Rebecca Stephens.

On 1 December 1995, she became the third woman, and the first British woman, to climb the Seven Summits inclusive of Mount Kosciuszko, the highest mountain in mainland Australia. On the same date, she also became the fifth woman, and the second British woman (also behind Stephens), to climb all seven continental summits inclusive of Carstensz Pyramid in Australasia.

On 18 May 1998, she climbed Kangchenjunga by its north face, making her the first woman to have reached the summit of the world's third highest mountain. Her obituary in The Guardian quotes her as "She watched in sorrow as other climbers she knew were lost – Alison Hargreaves, Chantal Mauduit – and wrote of her historic ascent: "Over the years four women had died while attempting to climb Kangchenjunga and it made me appreciate all the more how lucky I was to make the first female ascent and return safely."

She later became the first British woman to summit Makalu on 22 May 1999.

== Personal life ==
Harrison was married to Gary Pfisterer, whom she met on her expedition to Mount Everest.

== Death ==
Harrison died in 1999 in an avalanche in Nepal on an expedition to climb Dhaulagiri.

== Legacy ==
A memorial lecture is held in Harrison's memory each year, part of the Wilderness Lectures series. The event raises money for the Shiva Charity, which she supported, and which sponsors a school in Nepal, named in her honour.
