= 1986 K2 disaster =

Mountaineering expedition disaster on K2 in Pakistan

Coordinates: 35.8820°N 76.5114°E

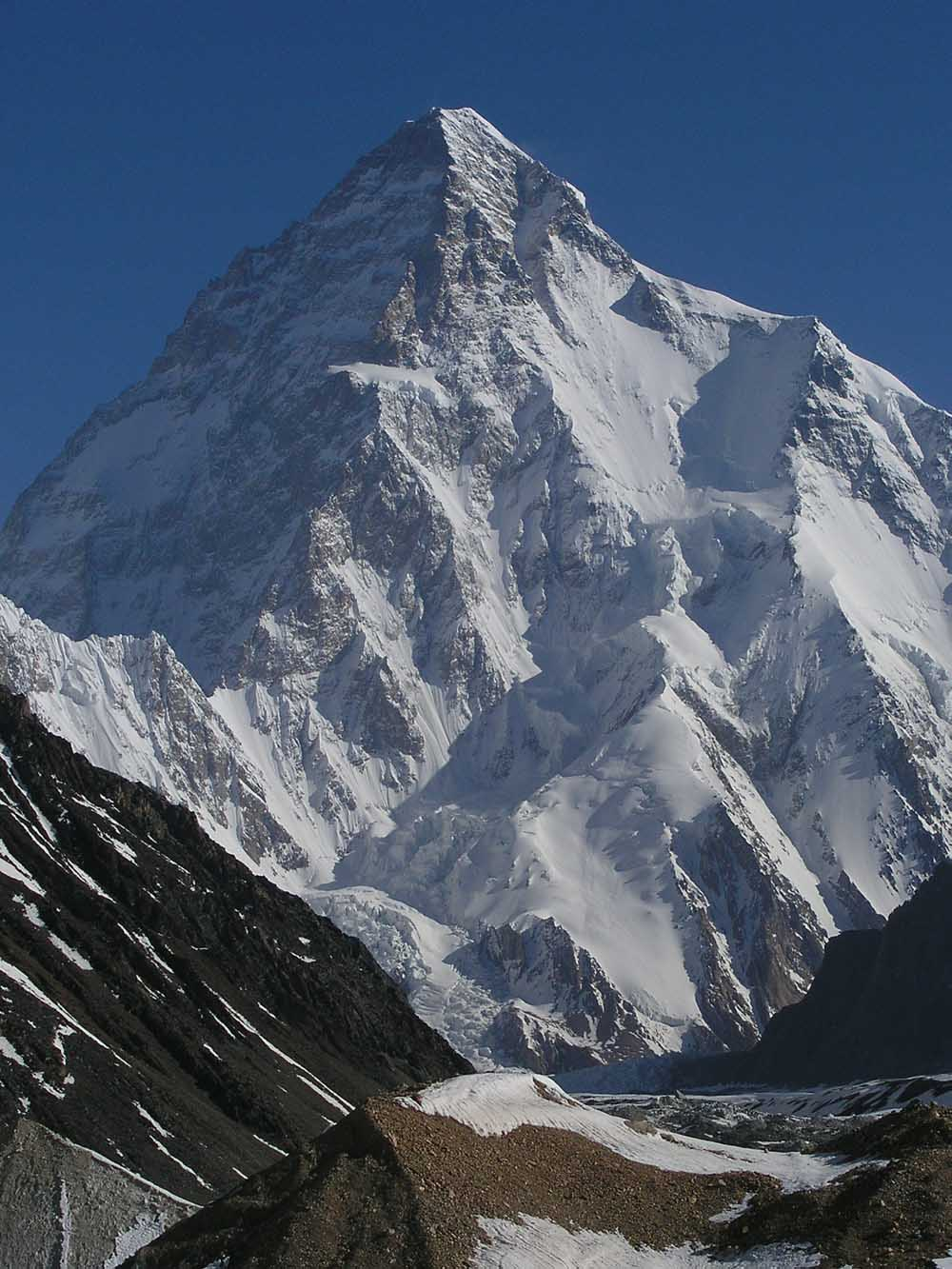
South face of K2 as seen from Concordia

The 1986 K2 disaster refers to a period from 6 August to 10 August 1986, when five mountaineers died on the eight-thousander K2, in the Karakoram during a severe storm. Eight other climbers were killed in the weeks preceding, bringing the total number of deaths that climbing season to 13.

== 21 June–4 August 1986 ==
The first casualties of the summer occurred on an American expedition. Like many others that summer, the team hoped to be the first to summit via the technically demanding and as-yet-unclimbed Southwest Pillar, also known as the "Magic Line". Team leader John Smolich and Alan Pennington were killed in an avalanche on 21 June. Pennington's body was pulled out by climbers who had witnessed the incident, but Smolich's body has yet to be found. The rest of the team left the mountain shortly after the accident.

On 23 June, French climbers Liliane and Maurice Barrard reached the summit, just 30 minutes after their teammate Wanda Rutkiewicz became the first woman to summit K2. Both Liliane Barrard and Rutkiewicz were climbing without bottled oxygen. As darkness fell, all three, along with team member Michel Parmentier and two Spanish climbers, Mari Abrego and Josema Casimiro, had to make an emergency bivouac shelter not far from the summit itself. While all six made it through the night, the Barrards disappeared at some point during the descent. Liliane's body was recovered three weeks later, but Maurice's was not found until 1998.

Polish climber Tadeusz Piotrowski fell to his death after a successful summit of the central rib of the south face on 10 July. Six days later, Italian soloist Renato Casarotto fell into a crevasse, after an unsuccessful attempt at climbing the Southwest Pillar. He was rescued from the crevasse, but died shortly thereafter. On 3 August, Wojciech Wróż, part of a combined Slovak-Polish team that successfully summited the Southwest Pillar without using bottled oxygen, slipped off the end of a fixed rope and fell to his death. On 4 August, Muhammad Ali, Sardar for a South Korean expedition, was killed by falling rocks on the Abruzzi Spur. Difficult weather conditions caused many other injuries and near-fatalities throughout the summer.

== 6–10 August 1986 ==
Alan Rouse was the leader of a British expedition. He obtained a permit to climb the difficult north-west ridge, instead of the conventional Abruzzi Spur. After several unsuccessful attempts to establish camps on their chosen route, the group disbanded, leaving only Rouse and cameraman Jim Curran on the mountain. Curran returned to Base Camp, but Rouse chose to continue his summit bid.

Rouse's expedition was not the only one facing difficulties that summer on K2. While Rouse and the British expedition attempted the north-west ridge, other expeditions had also been trying various other routes, with and without oxygen. After his fellow team members left the mountain, Rouse joined forces with six climbers—Austrians Alfred Imitzer, Hannes Wieser, Willi Bauer, and Kurt Diemberger; a Polish climber, Dobrosława Miodowicz-Wolf; and another British climber, Julie Tullis—in an attempt to summit via the conventional route, without a permit.

The newly formed team made it to Camp IV, the final staging post before the summit, but for reasons that are still unclear, the climbers decided to wait a day before making a summit push. Despite deteriorating weather conditions, Rouse and Wolf set out for the summit on 4 August. Wolf quickly tired and dropped back, and Rouse continued alone. Two of the Austrian climbers, Willi Bauer and Alfred Imitzer, caught up with him some 100 m (330 ft) below the summit. Rouse fell in behind the Austrians, and the three reached the summit together at around 4:00 p.m. on 4 August. Rouse was the first Englishman to reach K2's summit.

On the way down, 150 m (500 ft) below the summit, they found Wolf asleep in the snow and persuaded her to descend. They also met Kurt Diemberger and Julie Tullis, who were still on their way up, and tried unsuccessfully to persuade them to turn back. Diemberger and Tullis summited around 7:00 p.m. On the descent, Tullis fell, and though she survived, both she and Diemberger were forced to spend the night bivouacked in the open.

Eventually, all the climbers reached Camp IV and rejoined Hannes Wieser, who had stayed behind. The seven waited for the storm to abate. Instead, the storm worsened, bringing heavy snowfall, winds over 160 km/h (99 mph), and sub-zero temperatures. With no food and no gas to melt the snow into water, the team members were in imminent peril. At an altitude of 8,000 m (26,000 ft) the body requires approximately six litres (1.3 imp gal; 1.6 US gal) of fluid per day to avoid dangerous thickening of the blood. Given that the oxygen saturation of the air at this altitude is only a third of that at sea level, the risk of death by hypoxia is great.

Tullis died during the night of 6–7 August, presumably of HAPE (high-altitude pulmonary edema), a common consequence of lack of oxygen during physical exertion. The other six climbers stayed at Camp IV for the next three days, but remained barely conscious. On 10 August, the snowfall stopped, but the temperature dropped, and the wind continued unabated. Though weak and severely dehydrated, the remaining climbers decided they had no other choice but to descend.

Rouse, when conscious, was in agony, and the other climbers had to leave him behind in his tent to save their own lives. It was a decision for which the survivors, particularly Diemberger, would be severely criticized. Jim Curran, part of Rouse's British expedition, defended Diemberger, saying that "there was absolutely no way that either Diemberger or Willi Bauer could have gotten Rouse off the mountain alive." Imitzer and Wieser, blinded by the snow, collapsed just a few hundred feet from camp and could not be revived. Wolf, who was descending last, never made it back. A year later, members of a Japanese expedition found her attached to the fixed ropes, still standing upright and leaning against the wall.

Bauer and Diemberger, the two remaining climbers, found that Camp III had been blown away by the hurricane-force winds but were able to make it to the relative safety of Camp II during the evening of 10 August. Bauer made it to Base Camp under his own power, but Diemberger had to be brought down by Jim Curran and a pair of Polish climbers. Bauer and Diemberger were helicoptered to safety on 16 August. Both lost multiple fingers and toes as a result of severe frostbite.

== List of fatalities ==
=== 21 June–4 August ===
Name	Nationality	Date	Cause of death
John Smolich	United States	21 June	Avalanche
Alan Pennington	United States	21 June	Avalanche
Maurice Barrard	France	24 June	Disappeared on descent
Lilliane Barrard	France	24 June	Disappeared on descent
Tadeusz Piotrowski	Poland	10 July	Fall
Renato Casarotto	Italy	16 July	Crevasse fall
Wojciech Wróż	Poland	3–4 August	Fall
Muhammad Ali	Pakistan	4 August	Stonefall

=== 6–10 August ===
Name	Nationality	Date	Cause of death
Julie Tullis	United Kingdom	6–7 August	Precise details unknown: edemas, exposure and exhaustion most likely
Alan Rouse	United Kingdom	10 August	Precise details unknown: edemas, exposure and exhaustion most likely
Hannes Wieser	Austria	10 August	Precise details unknown: edemas, exposure and exhaustion most likely
Alfred Imitzer	Austria	10 August	Precise details unknown: edemas, exposure and exhaustion most likely
Dobrosława Miodowicz-Wolf	Poland	10 August	Precise details unknown: edemas, exposure and exhaustion most likely

== See also ==
- 1995 K2 disaster
- 2008 K2 disaster
- List of deaths on eight-thousanders

== Books ==
- Curran, Jim, K2: Triumph and Tragedy, Grafton, 1989, (ISBN 0-586-20569-1)
- Diemberger, Kurt, The Endless Knot: K2, Mountain of Dreams and Destiny, Mountaineers Books, 1991 (ISBN 0-89886-300-7)
