= Jerzy Kukuczka =

Polish alpine and high-altitude climber

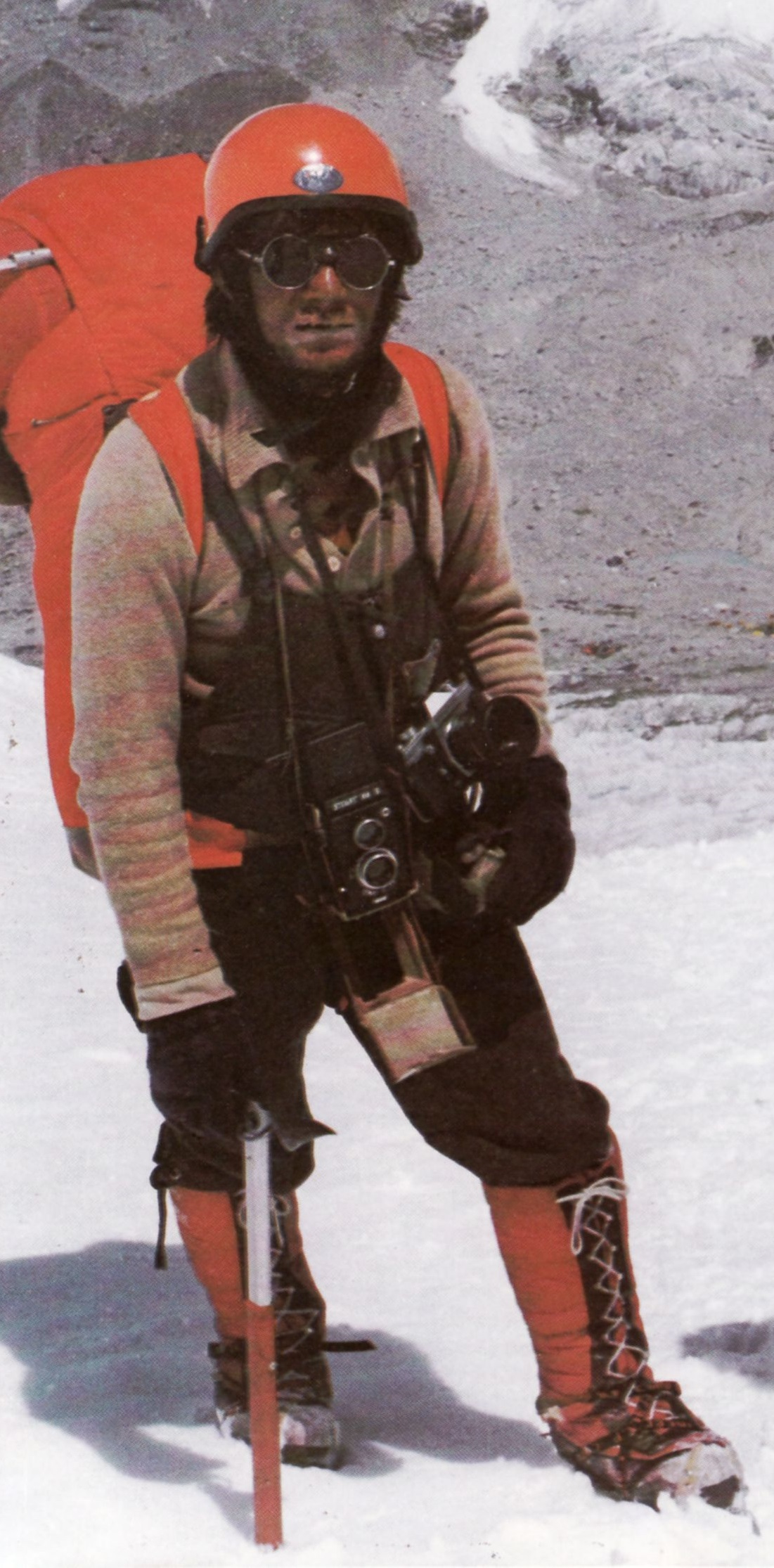
- Jerzy Kukuczka on Mount Everest, 1980

Personal information
- Nationality: Polish
- Born: 24 March 1948 Katowice, Poland
- Died: 24 October 1989 (aged 41) Lhotse, Nepal
- Website: Virtual Museum of Jerzy Kukuczka

Climbing career
- First ascents: Gasherbrum II East, Biarchedi, Manaslu East, Yebokalgan Ri, Shishapangma West
- Major ascents: Four winter ascents on the eight-thousanders
- Known for: Second to climb all 14 eight-thousanders

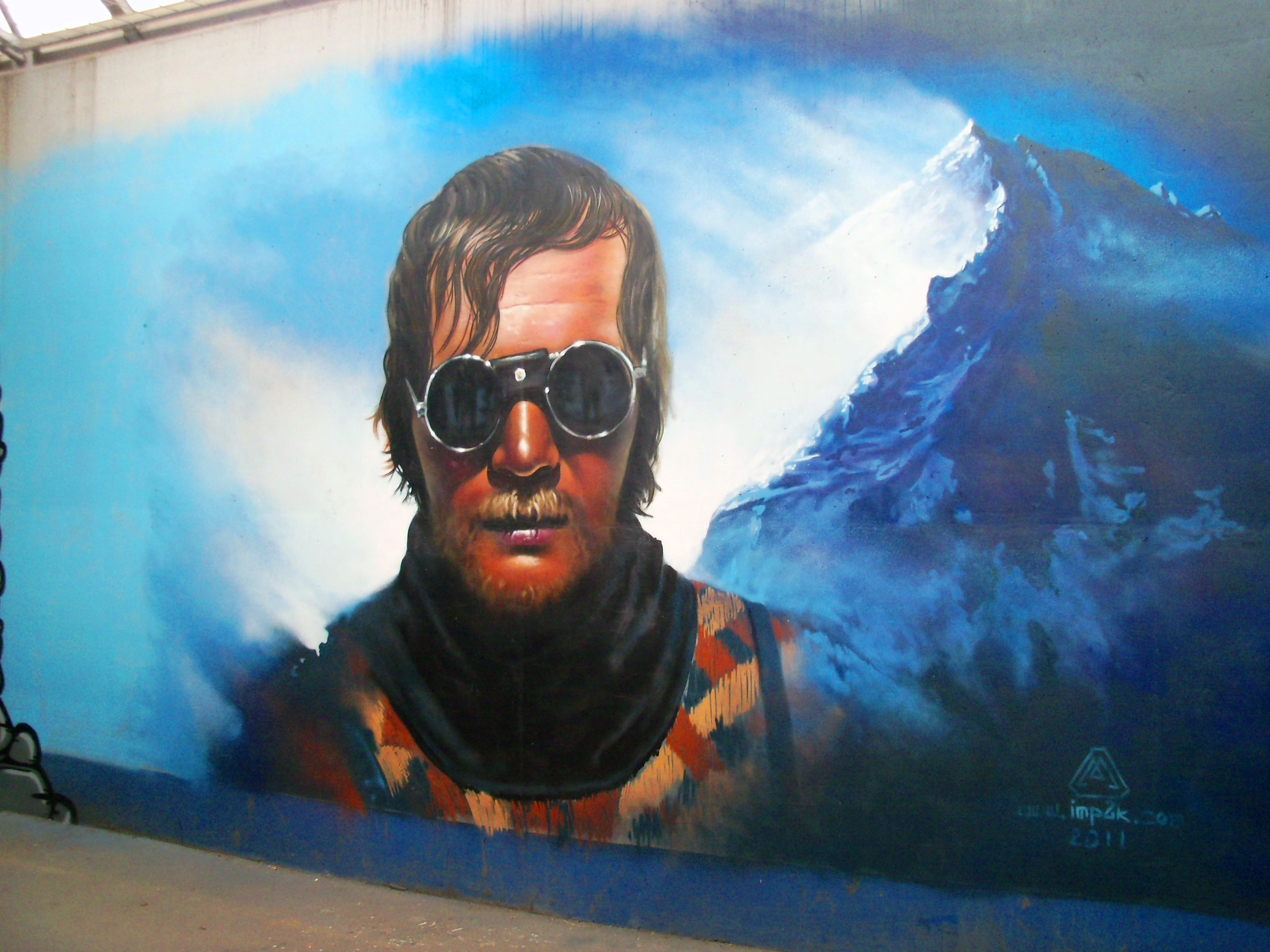
Kukuczka on a mural in Katowice

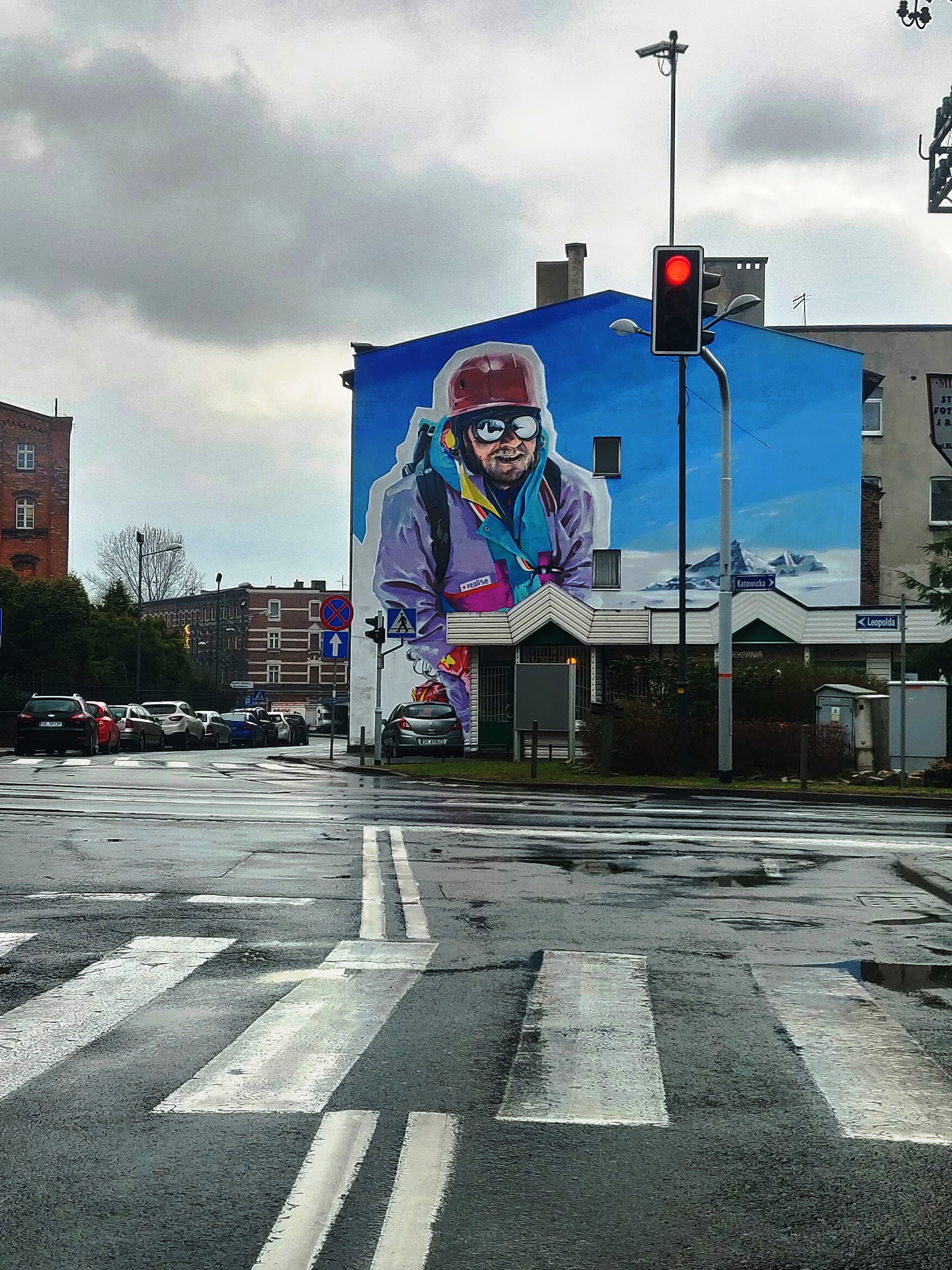
Street art of Kukuczka in Bogucice, the district of Katowice where he grew up and lived, unveiled in 2019.

Józef Jerzy Kukuczka (Polish: [ˈju.zɛf ˈjɛ.ʐɨ kuˈkut͡ʂ.ka]; 24 March 1948 – 24 October 1989) was a Polish mountaineer, regarded as one of the greatest high-altitude climbers in history. In 1987, he became the second man (after Reinhold Messner) to climb all 14 eight-thousanders in the world, a feat known as the "Crown of the Himalayas." He accomplished this feat in less than eight years, and climbed all, except for Lhotse, by new routes or in winter. He is the only person to have climbed two eight-thousanders in one winter, and his ascents of Cho Oyu, Kangchenjunga and Annapurna were the first winter ascents. His ascent of K2 in 1986, in alpine style with Tadeusz Piotrowski, is now known as the Polish Line. No other mountaineers have attempted an ascent using the route since.

Reinhold Messner, upon hearing that Kukuczka had completed all 14 eight-thousanders, wrote, "You are not second, you are great." The line was reproduced as the epigraph of Kukuczka's book and the Polish translation forms the title of a biography of him published in 2021. He died in 1989 while attempting to climb the south face of Lhotse.

== Life and career ==
Józef Jerzy Kukuczka was born in 1948 in Katowice, to an ethnically Silesian Goral family. He practiced weightlifting in high school and began climbing mountains at the age of 17. He was a trained engineer by profession. In 1965, he became a member of the Mariusz Zaruski Tatra Scouting Club in Katowice. In 1966, he joined the Katowice Alpine Club and completed a climbing course in the Tatra Mountains. After climbing in the Tatras, he progressed to the Alps, Alaska and the Himalayas.

He climbed his first eight-thousander, Lhotse, in 1979. The following year, he reached the summit of Mount Everest via a new south pillar route. In 1985, he made first winter ascents on Dhaulagiri and Cho Oyu within three weeks. In 1986, he and Krzysztof Wielicki made the first winter ascent of the world's third highest mountain, Kangchenjunga. The same year, Kukuczka established a new route on the unclimbed south face of K2, which he and Tadeusz Piotrowski ascended alpine-style. Their accomplishment pushed the boundaries of Himalayan mountaineering, with Kukuczka regarding this as the "most challenging climb he had ever undertaken at altitude."

Throughout his career, he ascended all 14 eight-thousanders in less than eight years, a feat he achieved on 18 September 1987. He held the world record for shortest time span to summit the eight-thousanders for nearly 27 years until May 2014, when Kim Chang-ho beat his record by one month and eight days. Unlike many other prominent high-altitude climbers of his time, the routes Kukuczka chose were usually original, many of them first ascents and often done during the winter. He established ten new routes on eight-thousanders, which remains a world record, and climbed four in winter. He was one of an elite group of Polish Himalayan mountaineers called the Ice Warriors. They specialized in winter ascents. In 1987, he was named Man of the Year in Poland after summiting all 14 eight-thousanders.

=== Rivalry with Reinhold Messner ===
In the 1980s, journalists frequently described the progress of Messner and Kukuczka's climbs as a race to complete the grand slam of climbing, but both men stated they did not like the description or even the implication they were competing. Ultimately, Kukuczka completed his sweep of the world's eight-thousanders in the winter of 1986–87, after Messner finished his grand slam by scaling Manaslu and Lhotse in the autumn of 1986. Kukuczka accomplished this feat in under eight years, twice as fast as Messner. He also established 10 new routes on eight-thousanders to Messner's six. Messner climbed all eight-thousanders without supplementary oxygen. Kukuczka used supplementary oxygen on Mount Everest.

=== Timeline of ascents above 8,000 metres ===
Year	Location	Mountain	Route	Comments
1979	Nepal	Lhotse	West Face	Normal Route
1980	Nepal	Mount Everest	South Pillar	New Route
1981	Nepal	Makalu	Variation to Makalu La/North-West Ridge	New Route, Alpine style, Solo
1982	Pakistan	Broad Peak	West Spur	Normal Route, Alpine style
1983	Pakistan	Gasherbrum II	South-East Spur	New Route, Alpine style
1983	Pakistan	Gasherbrum I	South-West Face	New Route, Alpine style
1984	Pakistan	Broad Peak	Traverse of North, Middle, Rocky and Main Summits	New Route, Alpine style
1985	Nepal	Dhaulagiri	North-East Spur	Normal Route, First Winter Ascent
1985	Nepal	Cho Oyu	South-East Pillar	Second Winter Ascent
1985	Pakistan	Nanga Parbat	South-East Pillar	New Route
1986	Nepal	Kanchenjunga	South-West Face	Normal Route, First Winter Ascent
1986	Pakistan	K2	South Face	New Route, Partial alpine style
1986	Nepal	Manaslu	North-East Face	New Route, Alpine style
1987	Nepal	Annapurna I	North Face	Normal Route, First Winter Ascent
1987	China	Shishapangma	West Ridge	New Route, Alpine style, Ski Descent
1988	Nepal	Annapurna East	South Face	New Route, Alpine style

== Death ==
Kukuczka died while attempting to climb the unclimbed South Face of Lhotse in Nepal on 24 October 1989. He was leading a pitch at an altitude of about 8,200 metres (26,900 ft) on a 6 mm secondhand rope he had picked up in a market in Kathmandu. According to Ryszard Pawłowski, Kukuczka's climbing partner, the main single rope used by the team was too jammed to be used and the climbers decided to use transport rope instead. When Kukuczka lost his footing and fell, the cord failed and he plunged around 2,000 metres to his death. His body was never recovered.

== Personal life ==
In Poland during the 1980s, there were significant issues with food scarcity and rationing amid severe economic difficulties. Despite this, Kukuczka was able to mount and equip numerous expeditions to multiple mountain ranges. He painted factory chimneys by rope access to finance his mountaineering.

Kukuczka married Cecylia (née Ogrodzińska) with whom he had two sons, Maciej and Wojciech. His younger son, Wojciech, also climbed Mount Everest just like his father. Kukuczka was a Catholic.

== Selected awards and honours ==
- Officer's Cross of the Order of Polonia Restituta (1989)
- Silver Olympic Order (1988)
- Man of the Year, Poland (1987)
- Gold Cross of Merit (1986)
- Silver Cross of Merit (1986)
- Gold Medal for Outstanding Achievements in Sport
- Academic Sports Association Gold Medal
- IAMES Gold Bagde
- Cross of Merit of the Polish Scouting Association (1974)

== Legacy ==
In the hamlet of Wilcze in Istebna, there is the memorial chamber for Kukuczka, created in 1996 by his wife Cecylia. Commemorative plaques devoted to the memory of Kukuczka are located in Chukhung, Nepal as well as the Tatra Symbolic Cemetery in Poland.

The mountain Yak Hotel in Nepal in Dingboche (4400 m a.s.l.) is named after him.

The Jerzy Kukuczka Academy of Physical Education is a public university in Katowice that conducts teaching and research in physical education and rehabilitation.

There is also a street in the Gaj district in Wrocław named after him. In 1988, the Polish Post issued a postage stamp featuring Jerzy Kukuczka honouring his reception of the Olympic Order.

In 2015, a statue of Kukuczka designed by Bogumił Burzyński was unveiled at the main entrance to the Physical Education Academy (AWF) in Katowice. His name was also included on the Monument of Alpine Climbers in Katowice.

He is the subject of the book Kukuczka: Opowieść o najsłynniejszym polskim himalaiście (Kukuczka: Story of the Poland's Greatest Climber) published in 2016 as well as documentary films Kukuczka by Jerzy Porębski and Jurek by Paweł Wysoczański, in 2011 and 2014, respectively. In 2018, Robert Talarczyk directed a play entitled Himalaje (The Himalayas) devoted to the life of Kukuczka, which premiered at the Silesian Theatre in Katowice.

== Gallery ==
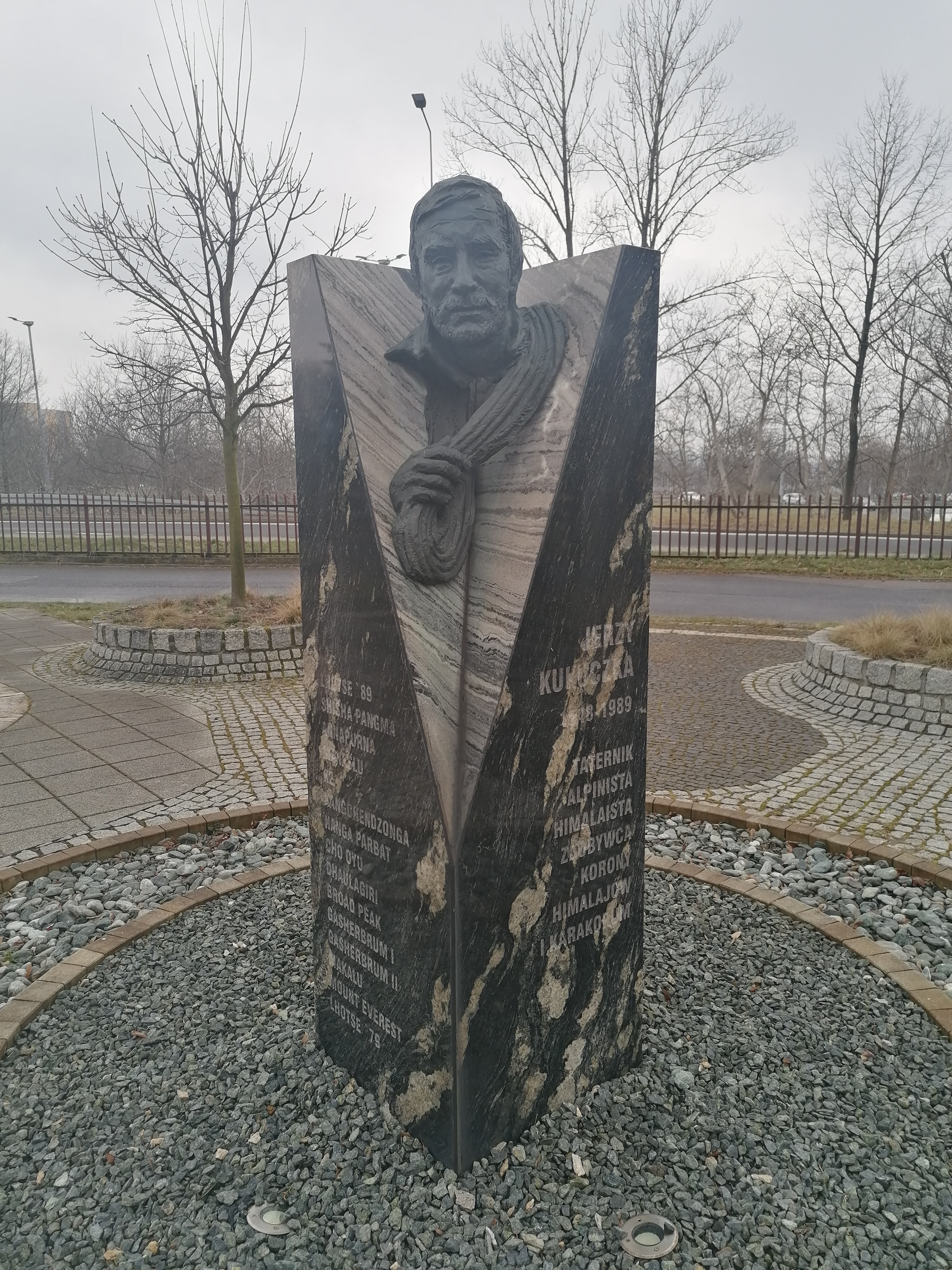
Monument in Katowice

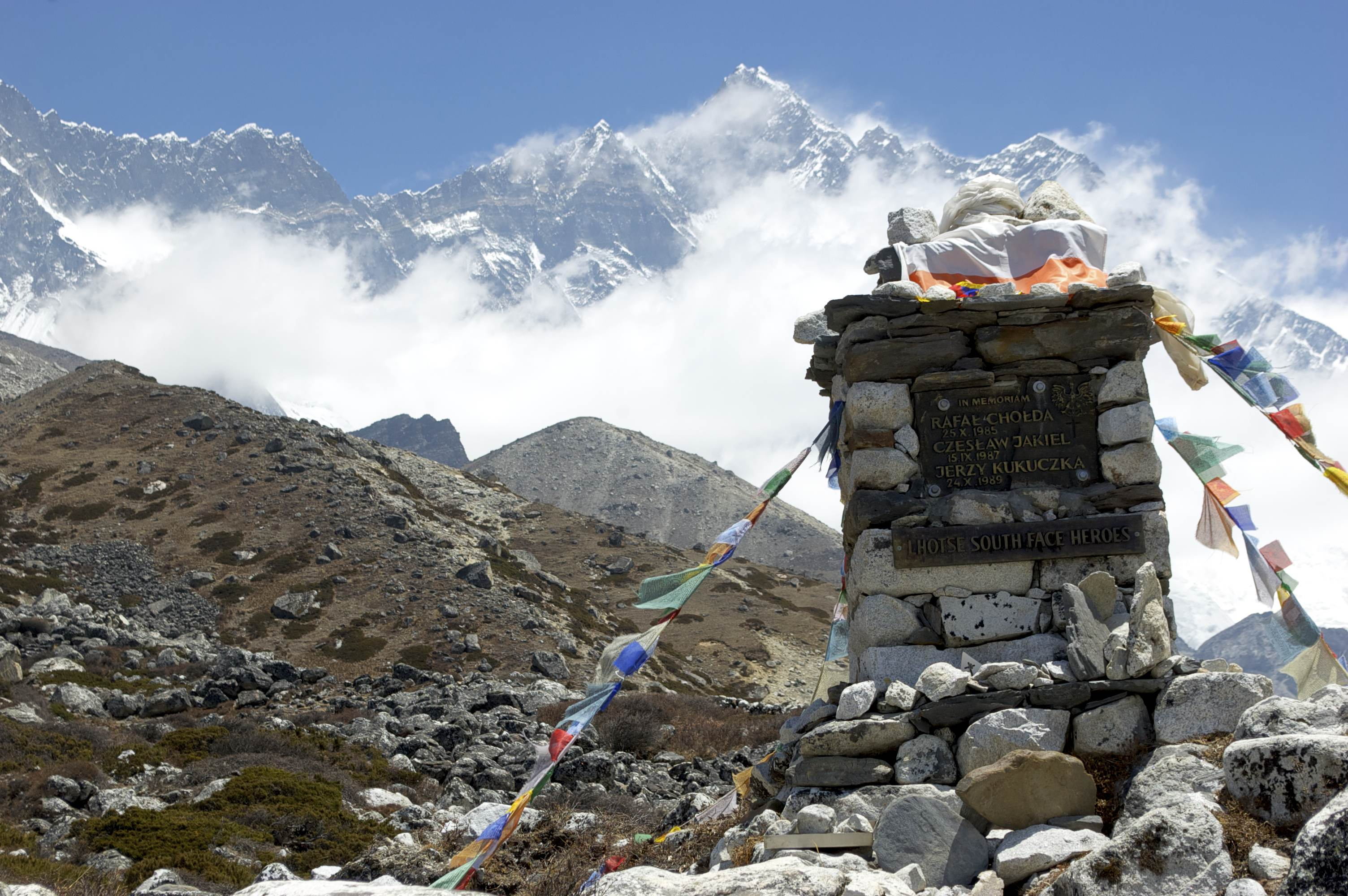
Jerzy Kukuczka's memorial with Lhotse in the background

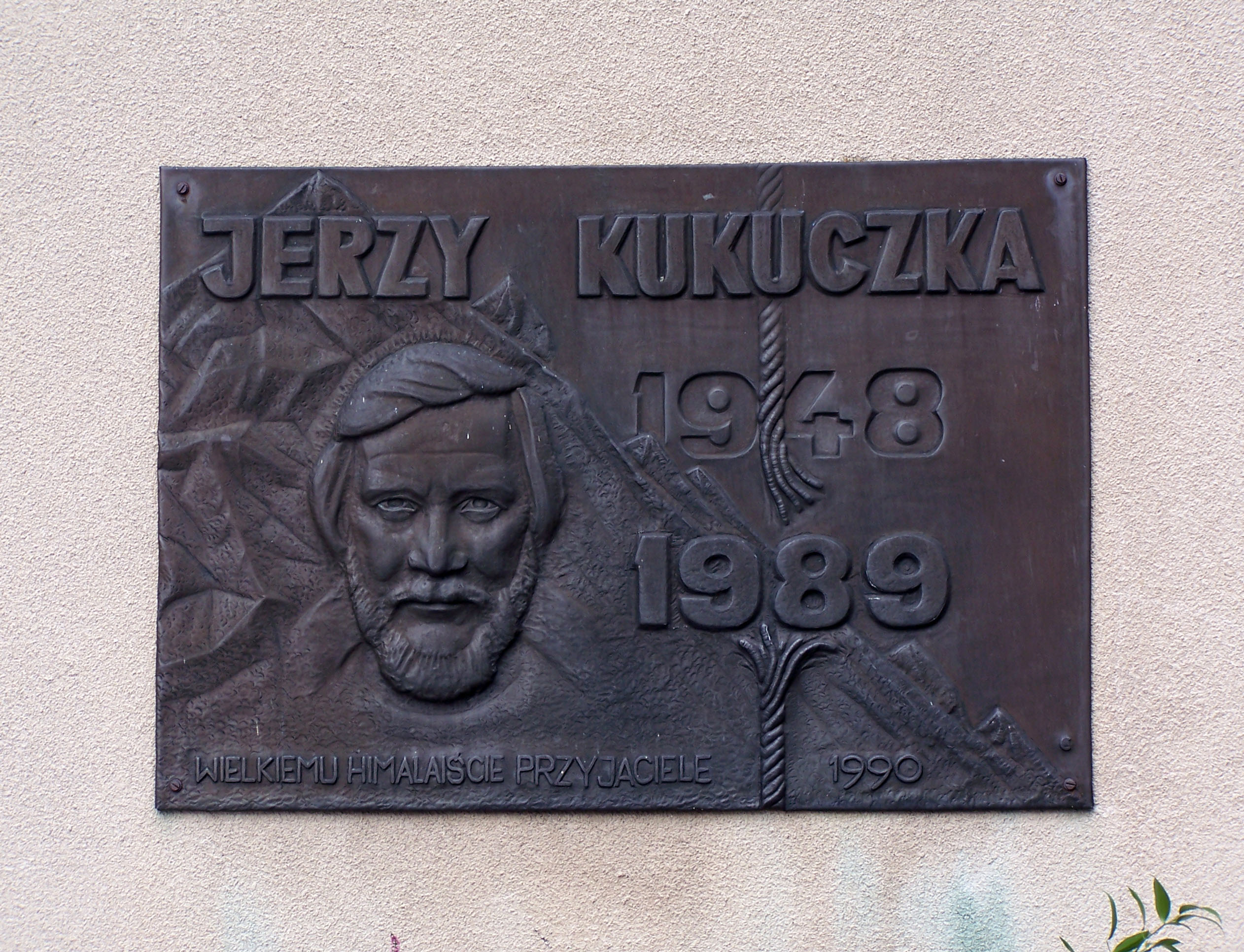
Memorial plaque in Istebna

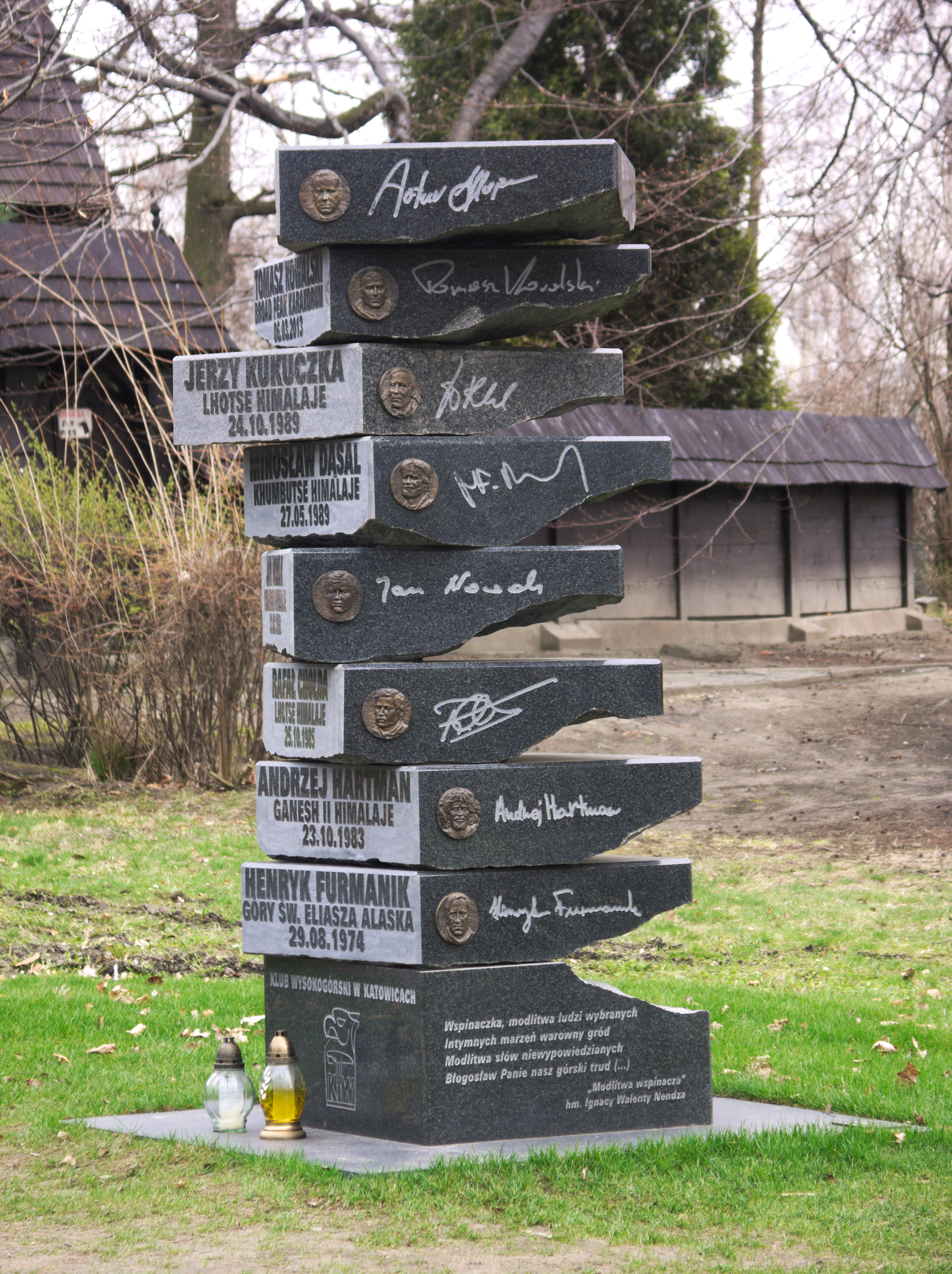
Monument of Polish mountaineers in Katowice

== See also ==
- List of eight-thousanders
- Krzysztof Wielicki
- Wanda Rutkiewicz

== Bibliography ==
- Kukuczka, Jerzy (1992). My Vertical World: Climbing the 8000-Metre Peaks. Mountaineers Books. p. 189. ISBN 0-89886-344-9.
- Wąsikowski, Piotr (1996). Dwa razy Everest. PiT.
- Kukuczka, Jerzy (1990). Na szczytach swiata. Krajowa Agencja Wydawnicza. p. 193. ISBN 83-03-03166-X.
- Gasca, Gian Luca (2021). Nie jesteś drugi jesteś wielki. Włoski portret Jerzego Kukuczki. Fundacja Wielki Czlowiek. ISBN 9788365095053.
