= Alan Rouse =

British mountain climber

Alan Paul Rouse (19 December 1951 – 10 August 1986) was the first British climber to reach the summit of the second highest mountain in the world, K2, but died on the descent.

== Education ==
Rouse was born in Wallasey and began climbing at the age of 15, soon climbing many of the most difficult routes in North Wales. He attended Birkenhead School from 1963 to 1970 and Emmanuel College, Cambridge until 1973. At Cambridge he was distracted from his studies by climbing and by his hedonistic life-style. He was highly sociable, but a heavy drinker; by his own admission he was a 'womaniser', and liked to 'live on the edge'. As a result, he only managed to gain an ordinary pass degree in mathematics, despite showing early promise in the subject. On leaving Cambridge he worked periodically in teaching but was often away on climbing expeditions.

== Mountaineering ==
Rouse was a technical rock climber, one of the best of his generation. His ascents of 'The Beatnik' on Helsby, and his solo ascent of 'The Boldest' on Clogwyn Du'r Arddu marked him out as a talent. He was a member of a group of contemporaries (including Cliff Phillips, Eric Jones, Pete Minks, 'Richard' McHardy) whose competitive spirit pushed them to solo the hardest routes of the day.

Rouse (with Minks) was considered to have raised the standards at Gogarth sea cliffs with the ascent of Positron in 1971.

His soloing was not confined to Wales, nor was it always successful. An attempt on the American Route on South Face of the Aiguille du Fou failed when a small piton being used for aid pulled near the summit. Although he fell only 5 metres, Rouse broke his ankle and was forced to make 17 abseils down the entire route, for much of the time using only his knees.

Rouse eventually became a professional mountaineer, lecturing, guiding, writing and acting as an adviser to the outdoor equipment trade. He moved to Sheffield in easy reach of the rocks of the Peak District. Rouse became a highly experienced climber in places as far afield as Scotland, North Wales, Patagonia, Peru, the Alps, the Andes, New Zealand and Nepal. He was also elected vice-president of the British Mountaineering Council.

In 1980, Rouse, Dr Michael Ward and Chris Bonington were among the few Europeans to visit the high mountains of China, reopening some of these to foreign mountaineers. In the winter of 1980–81, Rouse led a British expedition to attempt Mount Everest by the west ridge, without using oxygen or Sherpas. The trip was not successful, but in the summer of 1981 he climbed Kongur Tagh, a hitherto unclimbed peak in western China, with Bonington, Joe Tasker and Peter Boardman.

== 1986 K2 disaster ==
K2, Earth's second highest mountain, is regarded as a much more difficult climb than the highest mountain, Everest, and has a higher fatality rate. In 1983, Rouse made his first attempt on K2, by a new route up the south ridge, with an international team. In 1986, Rouse returned as the leader of a British expedition and obtained a permit to climb the difficult North-West Ridge, instead of the conventional Abruzzi Spur. After they had made several unsuccessful attempts to establish camps on their chosen route, the British team members – apart from Rouse and fellow climber and expedition cameraman Jim Curran – returned to the base camp.

While Rouse and the British expedition attempted the North-West Ridge, other expeditions had also been trying various routes, with and without oxygen. After his fellow team members left the mountain, Rouse and six climbers from these expeditions decided to join forces to try the conventional route without a permit. There were four Austrian men, Alfred Imitzer, Hannes Wieser, Willi Bauer, and Kurt Diemberger, a Polish woman, Dobrosława Miodowicz-Wolf, and a British woman, Julie Tullis.

They reached Camp IV at (8,157 metres, 26,760 feet), the final staging post before the summit. For reasons that are still unclear, this impromptu team decided to wait a day before trying the final stage to the summit. None of the climbers on the Abruzzi Spur chose to follow the team comprising three Korean climbers who had set out on an oxygen aided attempt on 3 August, even though the trail would have been broken through the deep snow for those climbing without oxygen. On the following day, it was obvious that the weather was deteriorating, but Rouse and Wolf nonetheless set out for the summit. Wolf quickly tired and dropped back, whilst Rouse continued. Because he was breaking the trail alone, two of the Austrian climbers, Willi Bauer and Alfred Imitzer, caught up with him some 100 vertical meters below the summit. Rouse fell in behind the Austrians, thus making his ascent easier for the last stretch, and the three reached the summit together on 4 August 1986.

On the way down, they found Wolf asleep in the snow and persuaded her to descend. They also met Kurt Diemberger and Julie Tullis, still on their way up, and tried to persuade them to descend but with no success. Diemberger and Tullis also summited but very late, at dusk which occurred around 7 pm. On the descent, Tullis fell. Even though she survived, both Tullis and Diemberger had to spend the night bivouacked in the open.

Eventually, all the climbers reached Camp IV, where Hannes Wieser waited. The seven waited for the storm to abate. Instead, the storm worsened with much snow, winds over 160 km/h, and sub-zero temperatures. With no food or any gas to melt snow into water in the stoves, the situation soon became life-threatening. Tullis died during the night of 6 – 7 August, presumably of HAPE (high altitude pulmonary edema), a common consequence of lack of oxygen and low air pressure at extreme altitudes. The other six climbers stayed for the next three days, but remained barely conscious. On 10 August the snow stopped, but the temperature dropped, and the wind continued unabated. The climbers, although severely weakened, decided they had no option but to descend to a lower base camp.

Rouse, when conscious, was in agony, and the other climbers left him so as to save their own lives. Of the seven climbers who had originally reached Camp IV on 4 and 5 August, only Diemberger and Bauer reached Base Camp.

Rouse is presumed to have died on 10 August 1986. He was survived by his girlfriend, Deborah Sweeney, who gave birth to their daughter, Holly, three weeks later.

== Commemoration ==
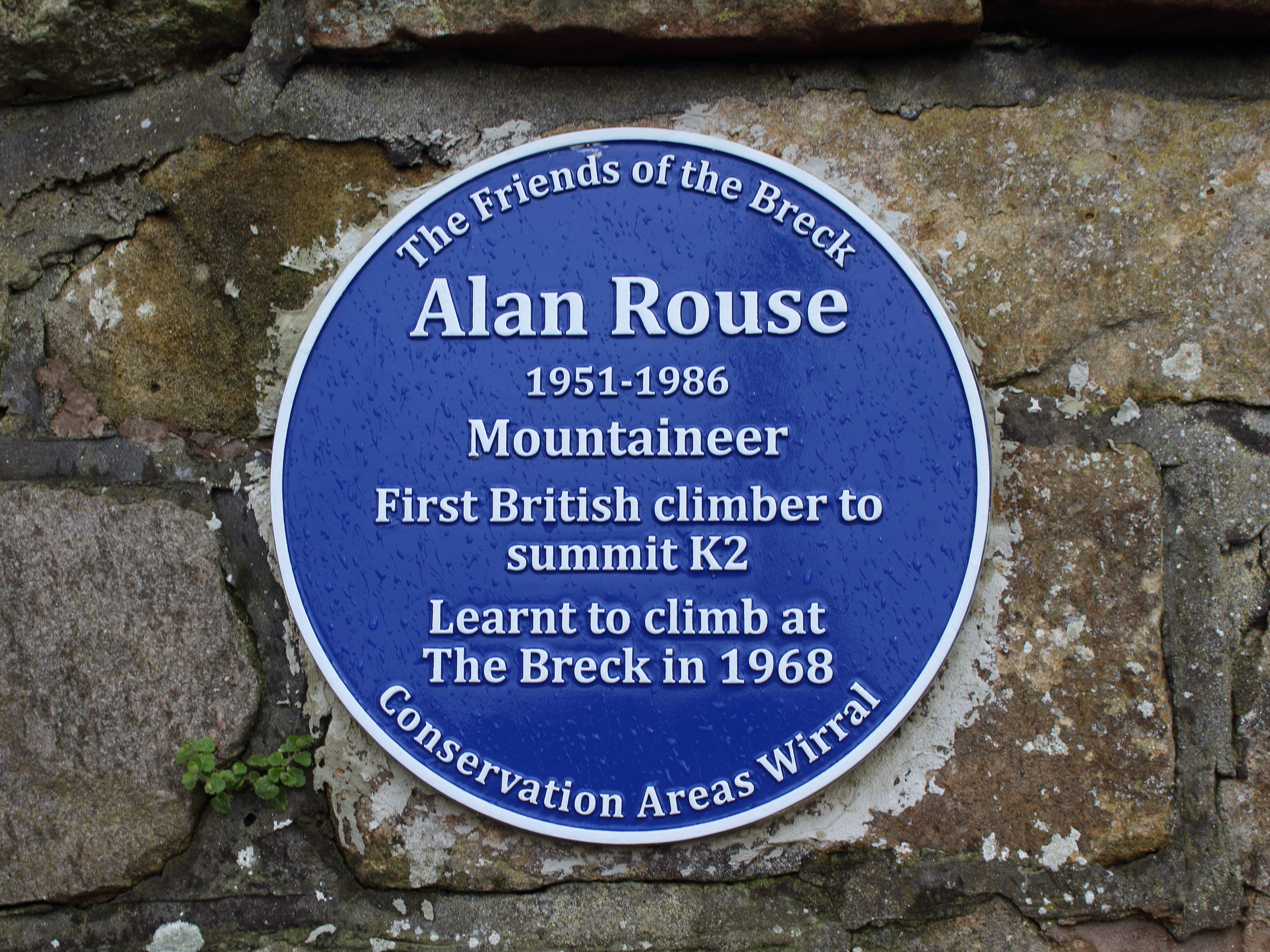
Commemorative plaque at The Breck, Wallasey

The library of the British Mountaineering Council is named in honour of Alan Rouse. In 2018, a memorial garden and a plaque were installed at the Breck in Wallasey.

There is a collection of climbing related Books, Journals, Climbing Guides and Expedition Reports named after Alan in Sheffield Libraries - the Alan Rouse Sheffield Library

== Books ==
- Barry, John, Savage Mountain – Savage Summer, Oxford Illustrated Press, 1987 (ISBN 0-946609-42-X)
- Birtles, Geoff, Alan Rouse: A Mountaineer's Life, HarperCollins, 1987 (ISBN 0-04-440075-6)
- Curran, Jim, K2: Triumph and Tragedy, Grafton, 1989, (ISBN 0-586-20569-1)
- Diemberger, Kurt, The Endless Knot: K2, Mountain of Dreams and Destiny, Mountaineers Books, 1991 (ISBN 0-89886-300-7)
- Fawcett, Ron; Lowe, Jeff; Nunn, Paul; Rouse, Alan; & Salkeld, Audrey, The Climber's Handbook: Rock, Ice, Alpine, Expeditions, Sierra Club Books, 1987 (ISBN 0-87156-702-4)
