= Liliane and Maurice Barrard =

French mountain climbers

Liliane Barrard
- Born: Liliane Bontemps; December 9, 1948; France
- Died: June 24, 1986 (aged 37); K2, Pakistan
- Occupation: Mountain climber
- Known for: Climbing high altitudes
- Spouse: Maurice Barrard

Maurice Barrard
- Born: Maurice Robert Barrard; January 18, 1942; France
- Died: June 24, 1986 (aged 45); K2, Pakistan
- Occupation: Mountain climber
- Known for: Climbing high altitudes
- Spouse: Liliane Barrard

Liliane Barrard (9 December 1948 – 24 June 1986) and Maurice Barrard (18 January 1942 – 24 June 1986) were a French couple who gained fame climbing at high altitude, mainly in the Himalayan and Karakoram ranges, and emphasizing Alpine-style 'fast and light' ascents.

== Life ==
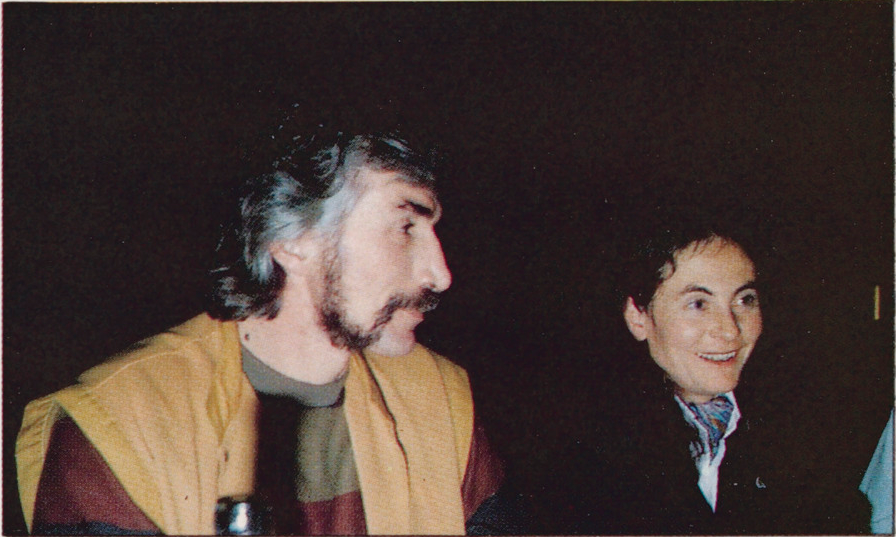
The French mountaineers Maurice (left) and Liliane Barrard.

The couple met while climbing in South America, having previously worked mainly in teaching. Billing themselves as the 'World's Highest Couple', they successfully climbed Gasherbrum II (8,035 m/26,360 ft) in 1982 with Liliane's brother, Alain Bontemps; this was the first ascent of this peak by a couple. In 1984, they recorded the first French ascent and first female ascent of Nanga Parbat 8,126 m (26,660 ft), not using supplementary oxygen

Maurice Barrard took part in the unsuccessful 1979 French national expedition to K2. This was a huge operation that became a financial disaster for the French Federation of Mountaineering (FFM). In the wake of this event, the FFM's Himalayan Committee was dissolved and reformed, with Maurice as the new president. Alpine-style rapid, light and determined assaults became viewed as the best way to climb the world's highest mountains.

In a further response to the failure of the expedition-style national expedition, Maurice and textile engineer Andre Vandeputte worked together to design highly-insuluating, down-filled equipment that would support lightweight ascents of very high mountains. The result was the mountaineering equipment Valandré, formed in 1983 in Belcaire, France. Valandré promoted its association with Liliane and Maurice in its advertising.

Although narrowly failing to make the summit of Makalu (8,462 m/27,765 ft), they nevertheless put the finances together to attempt K2 (8,611 m/28,268 ft) in 1986 with a small team consisting of themselves, Polish climber Wanda Rutkiewicz and French climber Michel Parmentier.

Rutkiewicz would later write of the couple:

The Barrards were an important influence on me, and I felt that they had the perfect marriage, equally happy in the mountains as in their daily groundling life. [...] Within the community of an expedition, a couple is liable to constitute a sub-group who may provoke tensions. But the Barrards proved that this needn’t always be the case.

== K2 ==
The start to the Barrards' K2 expedition was not a promising one: Maurice and Liliane "had left their entire expedition budget—thousands of dollars plus airline tickets and passports on the backseat of a taxi!" Everything was sorted out in due course, and the Barrards, Wanda Rutkiewicz and Parmentier arrived at the K2 motel at about the same time as Alan Rouse's British expedition, then headed to Base Camp.

The Barrards' expedition ascended the mountain very slowly, spending nights at 6300, 7100, 7700, 7900, and 8300 meters (20,669; 23,294; 25,262; 25,919; and 27,250 feet, respectively) on the climb. They spent their last night before their summit attempt bivouacked with a tent but no sleeping bags. The Barrards, Rutkiewicz, and Parmentier all summited successfully by 11:00am on June 23, 1986. Wanda Rutkiewicz was the first female ascender of K2, a mere 30 minutes before Liliane Barrard. Both women summited K2 without using supplemental oxygen.

The four climbers descended only as far as their bivouac site from the night before, near the Bottleneck (a treacherous terrain feature at around 8,300 m/27,250 feet). The Barrards and their group had run out of fuel for their stoves (which are necessary to melt snow for water in order to prevent dehydration at high altitude). Parmentier descended first, to try and borrow some stove fuel from a nearby pair of Basque climbers, Mari Ábrego and Josema Casimiro. The others descended after him. Rutkiewicz caught up with Parmentier; the Barrards lagged behind. The Basque climbers had also run out of gas, and accompanied Parmentier and Rutkiewicz back to the French Camp Three, at 7800m/25,600 feet.

Rutkiewicz and the Basques continued down the mountain, and Parmentier waited for the Barrards to reach Camp Three. The weather was deteriorating. A French climber climbing with an Italian expedition, Benoît Chamoux, tried to convince Parmentier to come down, without success, and left him a radio before turning around and heading back toward Base Camp. Eventually Parmentier, who had tried to wait for some sign of the Barrards, began to descend, in white-out conditions and gale-force winds. Parmentier was eventually guided down the mountainside via radio directions from Base Camp, about 3000m/9,843 feet below, based on the few landmarks he could find in the blizzard.

Rutkiewicz, suffering from frostbite, and Parmentier both reached Base Camp alive. The Barrards were never seen alive again. The morning after summiting, Maurice had been very tired, and he and Liliane had left their tent after their climbing partners. It was windy and visibility was poor. The most likely scenarios are that the Barrards wandered off-route in the storm; that they fell; or that they collapsed from exhaustion and possible hypoxia.

== Aftermath ==
A month later, a South Korean team found Liliane's body on a snow field at around 5,330 metres (17,500 ft), nearly 3,050 metres (10,000 ft) lower than where she was last seen; Maurice's body was not found until 1998 on the glacier just above Base Camp. Both are now buried at the Gilkey Memorial at the base of K2.

== See also ==
- 1986 K2 Disaster
- List of climbers
- List of solved missing person cases: 1950–1999

== Books ==
- Jordan, Jennifer, Savage Summit: True Stories of the First Five Women Who Climbed K2 (2006) ISBN 0-06-058716-4
- Reinisch, Getrude, Wanda Rutkiewicz: A Caravan of Dreams (2000) ISBN 0-9538631-0-7
