= Chantal Mauduit =

French mountaineer (1964–1998)

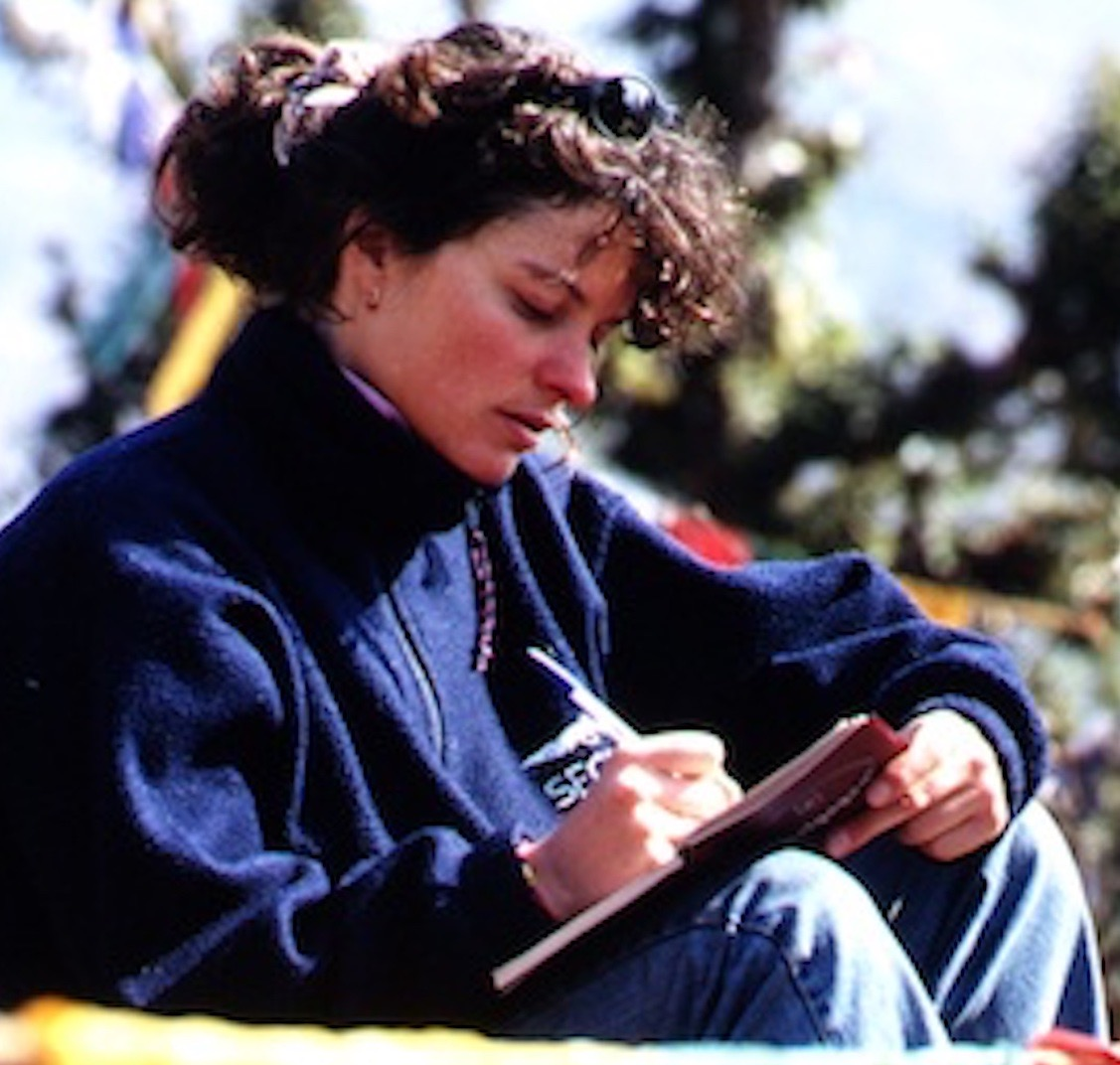

Personal information
- Born: Chantal Marie Agnès Mauduit; March 24, 1964 Paris, France
- Died: May 13, 1998 (aged 34) Dhaulagiri, Nepal
- Occupations: alpinist; mountaineer
- Years active: 1964-1998

Climbing career
- Type of climber: Alpine climbing; Eight thousander

Chantal Mauduit (24 March 1964 – 13 May 1998) was a French alpinist.

== Biography ==
Born in Paris, when Mauduit was five she moved with her family to Chambéry, so that her engineer father could take up a position at the plant Saint-Gobain. Mauduit was a second cousin of the alpine skier Georges Mauduit.

Mauduit started climbing at the age of 15 in the French Alps. After ascending several difficult alpine climbing routes in the Alps, she focused her attention on the Andes, and then the Himalayas, where she climbed K2 (1992; fourth woman overall), Shisha Pangma (1993), Cho Oyu (1993), Lhotse (1996; claimed first woman solo, with no proof she reached the summit), Manaslu (1996), and Gasherbrum II (1997), all without supplemental oxygen.

Mauduit needed to be rescued by Ed Viesturs and Scott Fischer on descent from K2 in 1992, Viesturs and Fischer gave up their own summit attempt of K2 at the time in order to get Mauduit, who had become snow blind, to safety.

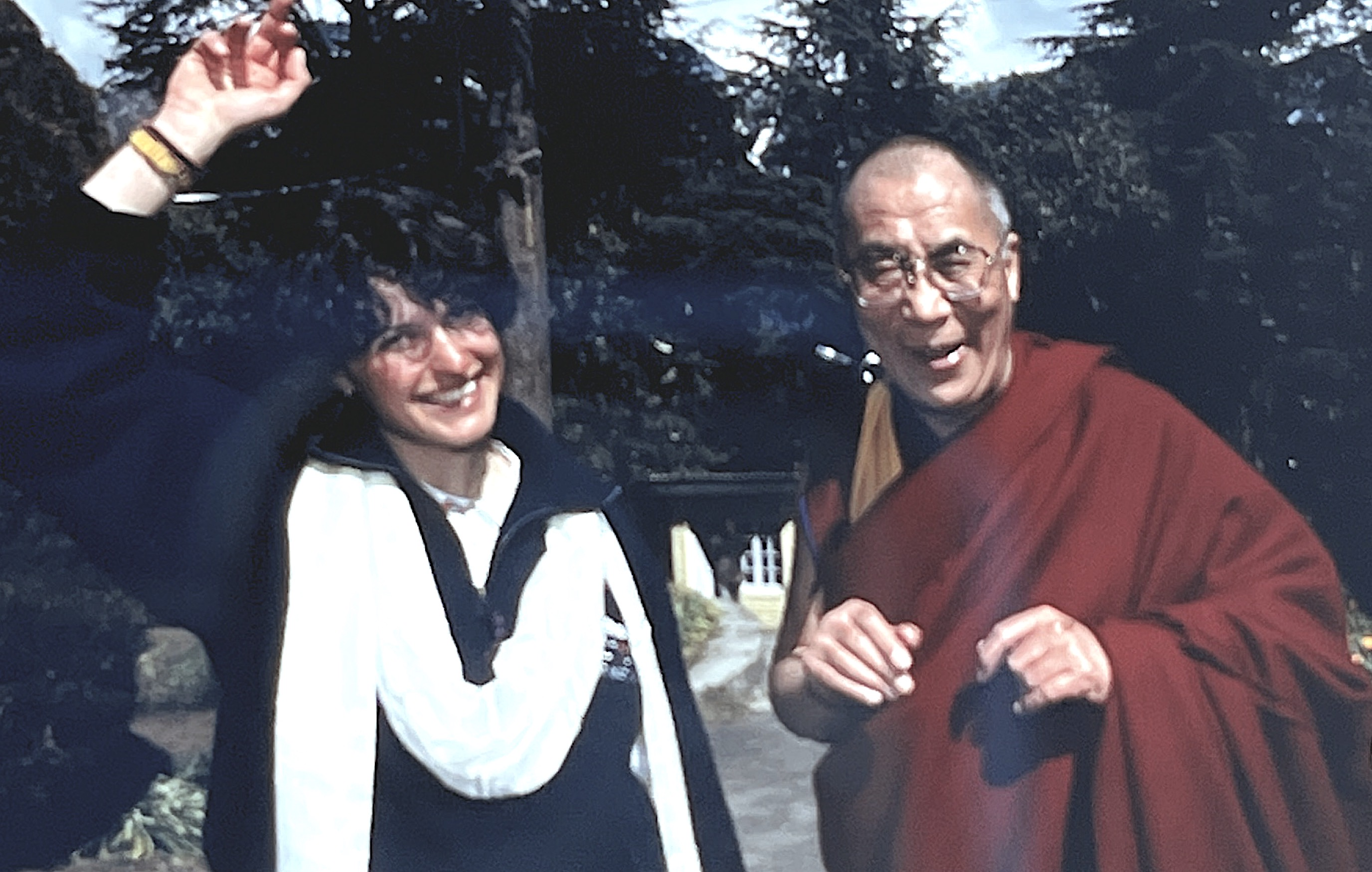
Mauduit with the 14th Dalai Lama in 1997

After collapsing during a failed summit attempt on Mount Everest in 1995, Mauduit was carried off the mountain by other climbers. Some climbers, including Viesturs, perceived her as ungrateful for never acknowledging the lifesaving assistance that she had been given. She was also accused of not pulling her weight on climbing expeditions, leaving it to others to fix ropes on difficult sections of mountain or stock higher camps with food and other provisions, and then taking advantage of their work.

Along with her Sherpa partner Ang Tsering, she was killed at Camp II on Dhaulagiri on May 11, 1998. Her body was returned to France and the autopsy concluded that the cause of death was a broken neck.

In the book, No Shortcuts to the Top, Viesturs tells about his discovery of Mauduit and Sherpa Ang Tshering's body in the tent at Camp II of Dhaulagiri. Viesturs writes that initially he was uncertain about the real cause of death, suggesting possible other causes, but then recognised that it was possible that a rockfall or ice had broken Mauduit's neck. Frederique Delrieu, a climbing companion of both Viesturs and Mauduit, saw Mauduit's body first-hand and confirmed that she had a broken neck.

In her honor, her friends and family created a foundation to help needy Nepalese children, especially girls and those in need of schooling: The Association Chantal Mauduit Namasté. Created by the Association, the Chantal Mauduit School in Kathmandu now enrolls 200 children.
