= Tadeusz Piotrowski (mountaineer) =

Polish mountaineer (1940–1986)

Personal information
- Born: 1 January 1940 Kołki, Ukrainian SSR, Soviet Union
- Died: 10 July 1986 (aged 46) K2, Karakoram, Pakistan
- Occupations: rock climber, mountaineer, writer

Climbing career
- First ascents: first winter ascent of the Troll Wall, Norway, 1972; first winter ascent of Noshaq, 1973; first ascent of Distaghil Sar East, 1980; first winter ascent of Api, 1984
- Known for: First ascent of the south face of K2, 1986

Tadeusz Piotrowski (January 1, 1940 – July 10, 1986) was a Polish mountaineer and author of several books related to the subject. He has been referred to as "perhaps the finest winter mountaineer of his day".

== Career ==
Piotrowski began his career in the 1960s in Poland's Tatra Mountains, around the time when he was a student at the Szczecin University of Technology. He would go on to become one of the leading Polish mountaineers, known worldwide as a winter climbing specialist. He was one of the earliest mountaineers to specialize in winter climbing.

His best known climbs, usually first along the given path, and most of them in winter, include: Trollryggen, Norway in winter 1972, Noshaq, Afghanistan in winter 1973, Trollryggen again in the winter in both 1974 and 1977, Tirich Mir, Pakistan in 1978, Rakaposhi, Pakistan in 1979, Distaghil Sar, Pakistan in 1980, Api, Nepal in winter 1983 and K2 in China/Pakistan in summer 1986.

In 1974, his climbing companion, Stanisław Latałło, died on Lhotse; whether Piotrowski could have helped him caused some controversy among Polish mountaineers. In 1983, Piotrowski directed the winter ascent on Api (7132 meters above sea level), and reached its peak on Christmas Eve. He was accompanied by Andrzej Bieluń, who climbed at the head, and was lost, assumed dead near the top of the mountain.

Piotrowski died on 10 July 1986. Two days previously he and Jerzy Kukuczka had finished the first ascent of the South Face of K2 (also called the "Polish Line") - a very difficult and dangerous route which was threatened by seracs and had been called "suicidal" by Reinhold Messner. "The route is so avalanche-prone that no one else has ever considered a new attempt." It was during the descent by a classic route (the Abruzzi Spur) that he lost both his crampons and fell to his death at around 7900 metres, following two exhausting stopovers at the wall with no food or water. The route Piotrowski and Kukuczka climbed remains unrepeated.^{[a]}

For his mountaineering successes, Tadeusz Piotrowski became a four-time recipient of the highest sports medal in Poland, the Gold Medal for the Exceptional Sporting Achievements.

== See also ==
- 1986 K2 Disaster

== Notes ==
a In 1993 a Canadian team (Barry Blanchard, Troy Kirwan and Peter Arbic) made a partial repeat, but exited onto the Abruzzi Spur at a lower point than the Poles had done, and did not reach the summit.

== Bibliography ==
- Gdy krzepnie rtęć 1982; ISBN 83-207-0351-4
- Naga Góra – Nanga Parbat 1990; ISBN 83-217-2808-1
- Słońce nad Tiricz Mirem 1988; ISBN 83-217-2687-9
- Viharban, fagyban 1988 ISBN 963-282-007-X
- W burzy i mrozie 1977
- W lodowym świecie Trolli 1986; ISBN 83-217-2541-4
- W Ścianie Trolli 1984; ISBN 83-217-2540-6
