= Dhaulagiri =

7th-highest mountain on Earth

- Nepali: धौलागिरी
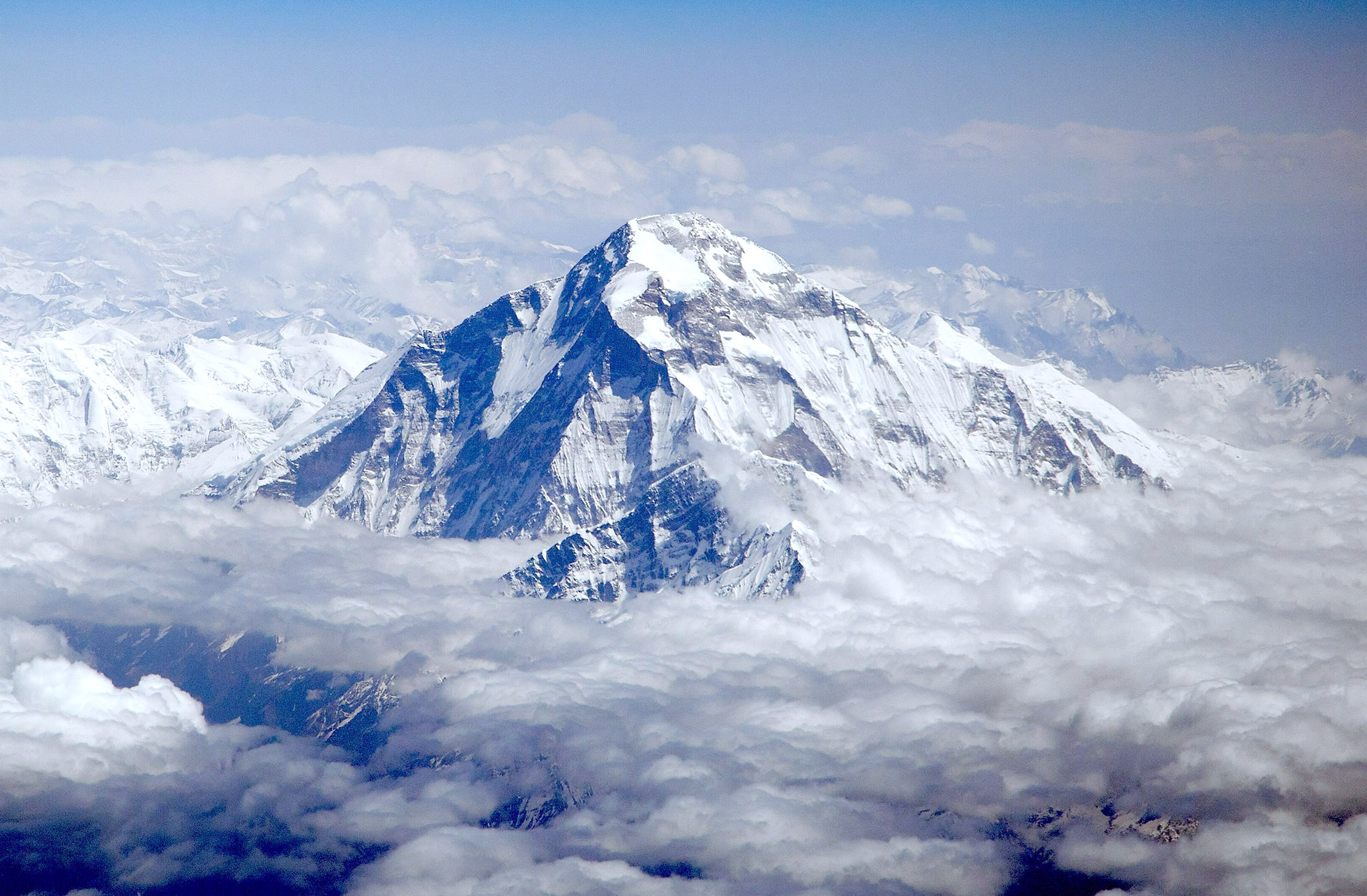
- Aerial view of Dhaulagiri I from the southwest.

Highest point
- Elevation: 8,167 m (26,795 ft); Ranked 7th
- Prominence: 3,357 m (11,014 ft); Ranked 55th
- Parent peak: K2
- Listing: Eight-thousander; Ultra
- Coordinates: 28°41′46″N 83°29′43″E

Geography
- The major peaks (not mountains) above 7,500 m (24,600 ft) height in Himalayas, rank identified in Himalayas alone (not the world). Legend: 1：Mount Everest; 2：Kangchenjunga; 3：Lhotse; 4：Yalung Kang, Kanchenjunga West; 5：Makalu; 6：Kangchenjunga South; 7：Kangchenjunga Central; 8：Cho Oyu; 9：Dhaulagiri; 10：Manaslu (Kutang); 11：Nanga Parbat (Diamer); 12：Annapurna; 13：Shishapangma (Shishasbangma, Xixiabangma); 14：Manaslu East; 15：Annapurna East Peak; 16： Gyachung Kang; 17：Annapurna II; 18：Tenzing Peak (Ngojumba Kang, Ngozumpa Kang, Ngojumba Ri); 19：Kangbachen; 20：Himalchuli (Himal Chuli); 21：Ngadi Chuli (Peak 29, Dakura, Dakum, Dunapurna); 22：Nuptse (Nubtse); 23：Nanda Devi; 24：Chomo Lonzo (Chomolonzo, Chomolönzo, Chomo Lönzo, Jomolönzo, Lhamalangcho); 25：Namcha Barwa (Namchabarwa); 26：Zemu Kang (Zemu Gap Peak); 27：Kamet; 28：Dhaulagiri II; 29：Ngojumba Kang II; 30：Dhaulagiri III; 31：Kumbhakarna Mountain (Mount Kumbhakarna, Jannu); 32：Gurla Mandhata (Naimona'nyi, Namu Nan); 33：Hillary Peak (Ngojumba Kang III); 34：Molamenqing (Phola Gangchen); 35：Dhaulagiri IV; 36：Annapurna Fang; 37：Silver Crag; 38：Kangbachen Southwest; 39：Gangkhar Puensum (Gangkar Punsum); 40：Annapurna III; 41：Himalchuli West; 42：Annapurna IV; 43：Kula Kangri; 44：Liankang Kangri (Gangkhar Puensum North, Liangkang Kangri); 45：Ngadi Chuli South
- Location: Nepal
- Parent range: Dhaulagiri Himal

Climbing
- First ascent: 13 May 1960 by Kurt Diemberger, A. Schelbert, E. Forrer, Nawang Dorje, Nyima Dorje (First winter ascent 21 January 1985 Jerzy Kukuczka and Andrzej Czok)
- Easiest route: Northeast ridge

Dhaulagiri, located in Nepal, is the seventh highest mountain in the world at 8,167 metres (26,795 ft) above sea level, and the highest mountain within the borders of a single country. Dhaulagiri I is also the highest point of the Gandaki river basin. It was first climbed on 13 May 1960 by a Swiss-Austrian-Nepali expedition. Annapurna I (8,091 m (26,545 ft)) is 34 km (21 mi) east of Dhaulagiri. The Kali Gandaki River flows between the two in the Kali Gandaki Gorge, the world's deepest. The town of Pokhara is south of the Annapurnas, an important regional center and the gateway for climbers and trekkers visiting both ranges as well as a tourist destination in its own right.

== Toponymy ==
Dhaulagiri (धौलागिरी) is the Nepali name for the mountain which comes from Sanskrit where धवल (dhawala) means dazzling, white, beautiful and गिरि (giri) means mountain.

== Geography ==
Looking north from the plains of India, most 8,000-metre peaks are obscured by nearer mountains, but in clear weather, Dhaulagiri is conspicuous from northern Bihar and as far south as Gorakhpur in Uttar Pradesh. In 1808, survey computations showed it to be the highest mountain yet surveyed. This lasted until 1838 when Kangchenjunga took its place, followed by Mount Everest in 1858.

Dhaulagiri I stands to the east of the range which bears its name. Its sudden rise from lower terrain is almost unequaled—it rises 7,000 m (22,970 ft) from the Kali Gandaki River 30 km to the southeast, while the South and West faces rise precipitously over 4,000 m (13,120 ft). Such is its vertical relief that despite being closer to Cho Oyu and Mount Everest, it is the only one of the Nepali eight-thousanders whose prominence parent is K2, over 1,031 km (640 mi) away. The south face of Gurja Himal in the titular massif is also notably immense.

The rock layers found at the summit of Dhaulagiri, as well as Everest, are made up of limestone and dolomite formed at the bottom of the ocean. The summits of the other Himalayan eight-thousanders are made up of granite that was formed deep underground.

== History ==
- 1809 - Captain William Webb calibrated the height

=== Climbing history ===
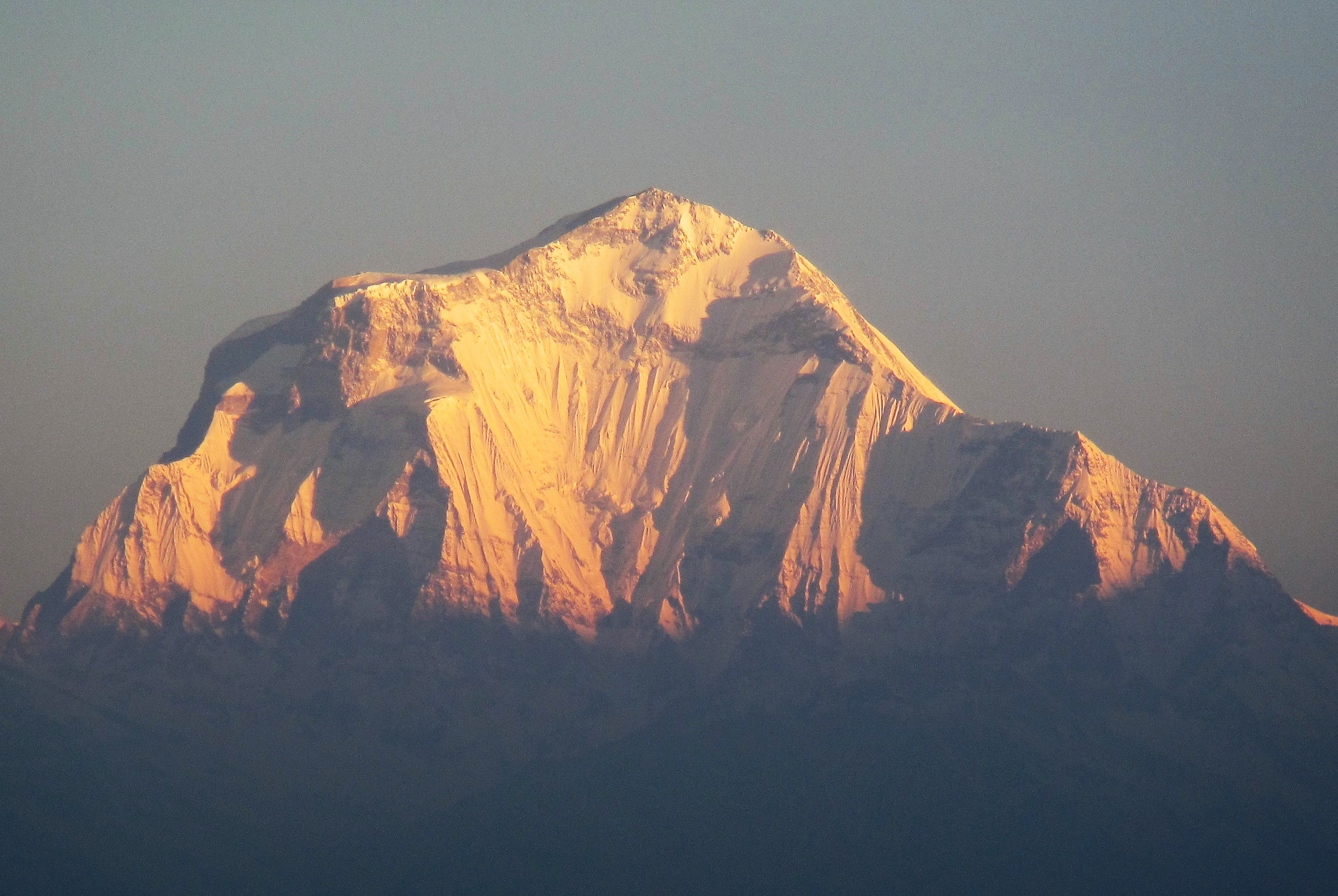
The unclimbed South Face of Dhaulagiri, seen from Poon Hill

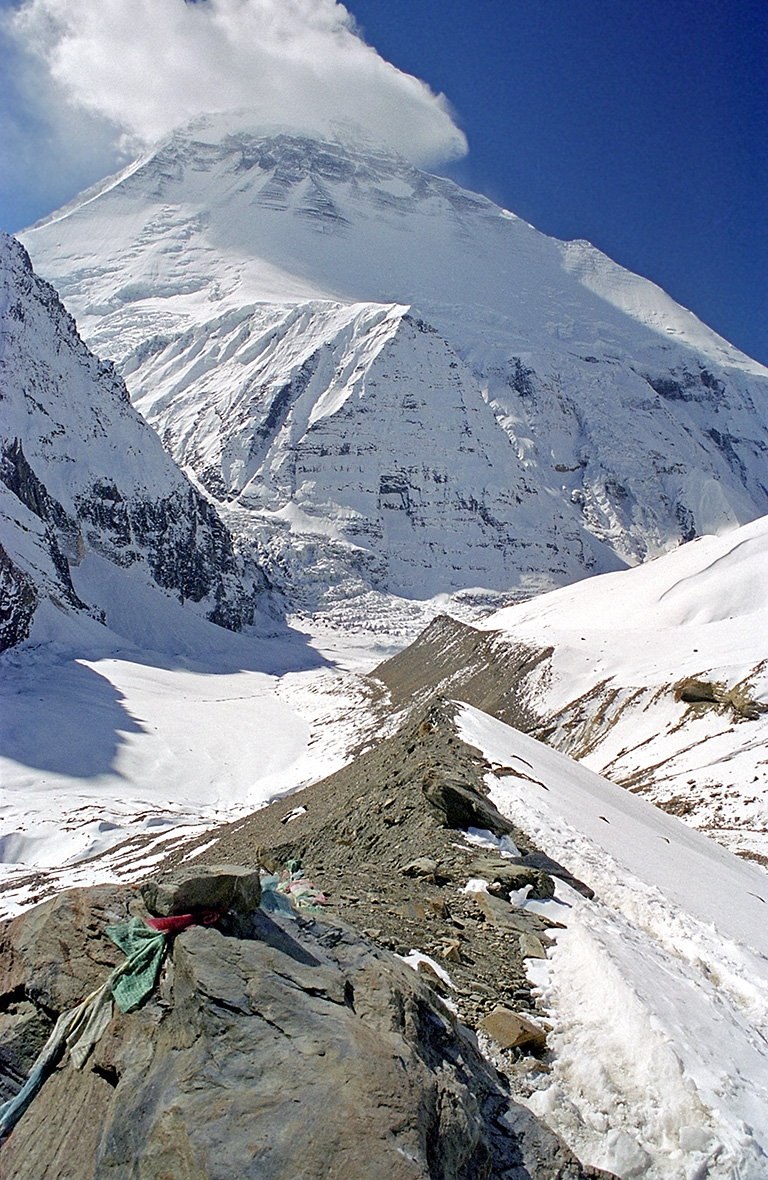
Dhaulagiri I in October 2002. The northeast ridge is the left skyline.

Dhaulagiri was the penultimate eight-thousander to be summitted, and the final in Nepal. As its other routes are disproportionately dangerous, most ascents have followed the Northeast Ridge route of the first ascent, but climbs have been made from most directions. As of 2024, the two aspects which have repelled all attempts along their full length are the Northwest Ridge (though it has been climbed to the summit via the so-called "Pear" buttress) and the South Face. The latter is often regarded as one of the greatest remaining challenges in alpinism.

As of 2007, there had been 358 successful ascents and 58 fatalities, which is a summit to a fatality rate of 16.2%. Between 1950 and 2006, 2.88% of 2,016 expedition members and staff going above base camp on Dhaulagiri I died. On all 8,000 metre peaks in Nepal the death rate was 1.63%, ranging from 0.65% on Cho Oyu to 4.04% on Annapurna I and 3.05% on Manaslu.

==== Partial timeline ====
- 1950 – Dhaulagiri I reconnoitered by a French expedition led by Maurice Herzog. They do not see a feasible route and switch to Annapurna, where they make the first ascent of an 8000 m peak.
- 1953–1958 – Five expeditions attempt the north face, or "Pear Buttress", route.
- 1959 – Austrian expedition led by Fritz Moravec makes the first attempt on the northeast ridge.
- 1960 – Swiss-Austrian expedition led by Max Eiselin makes the first successful ascent to the summit of Dhaulagiri. Successful ascent by Kurt Diemberger, Peter Diener, Ernst Forrer, Albin Schelbert, Nyima Dorje Sherpa, Nawang Dorje Sherpa on 13 May. First Himalayan climb supported by the first prototype fixed-wing aircraft, which, after establishing the still standing record for highest fixed wing landing, eventually crashed in Hidden Valley north of the mountain during takeoff and was abandoned.
- 1969 – American team led by Boyd Everett attempt southeast ridge; seven team members, including Everett, were killed in an avalanche.
- 1970 – The second ascent, via the northeast ridge by a Japanese expedition led by Tokufu Ohta and Shoji Imanari. Tetsuji Kawada and Lhakpa Tenzing Sherpa reach the summit.
- 1973 – American team led by James D. Morrissey makes the third ascent via the northeast ridge. Summit team: John Roskelley, Louis Reichardt, and Nawang Samden Sherpa.
- 1975 – Japanese team led by Takashi Amemiya attempts southwest ridge (also known as the south pillar). Six are killed in an avalanche, including Norio Suzuki.
- 1976 – Italian expedition makes the fourth ascent.
- 1977 – International team led by Reinhold Messner attempts the south face.
- 1978, spring: Amemiya returns with an expedition that puts five members on the summit via the southwest ridge—the first ascent not using the northeast ridge. One team member dies during the ascent.
- 1978, autumn – Seiko Tanaka of Japan leads successful climb of the very difficult southeast ridge. Four are killed during the ascent. French team attempts the southwest buttress (also called the "south buttress"), only reaches 7,200 m.
- 1980 – A four-man team consisting of Polish climbers Voytek Kurtyka, Ludwik Wiczyczynski, Frenchman René Ghilini, and Scotsman Alex MacIntyre climb the east face, topping out at 7,500 m on the northeast ridge. After a bivouac, they descend back to base camp in a storm. One week later they climb the mountain via the northeast ridge reaching the summit on 18 May.
- 1981 – Yugoslav team reaches 7,950 m after putting up the first route on the true south face of the mountain, on the right side, connecting with the southeast ridge. They climb in alpine style but suffer four days of open bivouacs and six days without food before returning. Hironobu Kamuro of Japan reaches the summit alone, via the normal route.
- 1982, 5 May – Three members – Philip Cornelissen, Rudi Van Snick, and Ang Rita Sherpa – of a Belgian-Nepali team reach the summit via the north-east ridge. A day later, four more climbers – Ang Jangbu Sherpa, Marnix Lefever, Lut Vivijs, and Jan Vanhees – summit also. Vivijs becomes the first woman to reach the summit.
- 1982, 13 December – Two members (Akio Koizumi and Wangchu Shelpa) of the Japanese team led by Jun Arima of the Academic Alpine Club of Hokkaido University reach the summit. By the world calendar, winter begins 21 December, so this was not winter but a very-late-autumn-climb. However, the climb was done under a winter climbing permit, which the Nepali government issues for climbs beginning on or after 1 December.
- 1984 – Three members of the Czechoslovak expedition (Jan Simon, Karel Jakes, Jaromir Stejskal) climb the west face to the summit. Simon died during the descent.
- 1985 – Polish expedition led by Adam Bilczewski set out to conquer Dhaulagiri for the first time in winter. After seven weeks of dramatic struggle against hurricane-force winds and temperatures below −40c°, Andrzej Czok and Jerzy Kukuczka achieve the first winter ascent on 21 January.
- 1986 – A mostly Polish expedition puts up a second south face route, on the left side of the face connecting with the southwest ridge route. They go above 7,500 m but do not reach the summit.
- 1988 – Soviet mountaineers Yuri Moiseev and Kazbek Valiev, in cooperation with Zoltan Demján of Czechoslovakia, succeed in climbing the southwest buttress. This 3,000-metre ascent, with difficult technical climbing at 6,800–7,300 m, was acknowledged as the year's best achievement at the UIAA Expedition Commission Conference.
- 1993 – Russian-British team puts up the direct north face route.
- 1995 — Anatoli Boukreev, speed ascent, record time 17 hours 15 mins, base camp to summit.
- 1998 – French climber Chantal Mauduit and Sherpa Ang Tshering die when an avalanche strikes their tent on the Northeast Ridge. On 1 May the Greek climber Nikolaos Papandreou is killed falling in a gorge. On 2 October, the Greek Babis Tsoupras reaches the summit but does not return. The bodies of the Greek climbers were not found.
- 1999 – On 24 October, British climber Ginette Harrison dies in an avalanche on Dhaulagiri. Days later, Slovenian Tomaž Humar climbs the south face solo but does not reach the summit. His ascent ended at 7,300 m due to a 300 m band of rotten rock. Humar traverses to the dangerous southeast ridge, re-enters the face briefly, and exits at 8000 m for a descent on the northeast ridge.
- 2024 – On 6 October, five Russians, Alexander Dusheiko, Oleg Kruglov, Vladimir Chistikov, Mikhail Nosenko and Dmitry Shpilevoy, went missing while climbing Dhaulagiri. Their bodies were found on 8 October.

== See also ==
- List of ultras of the Himalayas
- List of deaths on Dhaulagiri

== Sources ==
- Colebrooke, H.T. (January 1818), Thomson, Thomas (ed.), "On the height of the Himalaya mountains", Annals of Philosophy, vol. XI, no. LXI, pp. 47–52
- Diemberger, Kurt (1999). The Kurt Diemberger Omnibus (Summits and Secrets). Seattle, WA, USA: The Mountaineers. ISBN 0-89886-606-5.
- Monier-Williams, Monier (1964) [1899]. A Sanskrit-English Dictionary. Oxford University Press.
- Neate, Jill (1989). High Asia: An Illustrated History of the 7000 Metre Peaks. Seattle: The Mountaineers. ISBN 0-89886-238-8.
- Waller, Derek John (2004). The Pundits: British Exploration of Tibet & Central Asia. Lexington, KY, USA: University Press of Kentucky. ISBN 0-8131-9100-9.
- Isserman, Maurice; Weaver, Stewart (2010). Fallen Giants: A History of Himalayan Mountaineering from the Age of Empire to the Age of Extremes. Yale University Press. ISBN 978-0300164206.

== Bibliography ==
- American Alpine Journal, 1974, 1976, 1977, 1979, 1986, 1987, 1994, 1999, 2000.
- Eiselin, Max, The Ascent of Dhaulagiri, OUP, 1961
- Ohmori, Koichiro (1994). Over the Himalaya. Cloudcap/The Mountaineers.
- Himalayan Index
