= Kurt Diemberger =

Austrian mountaineer

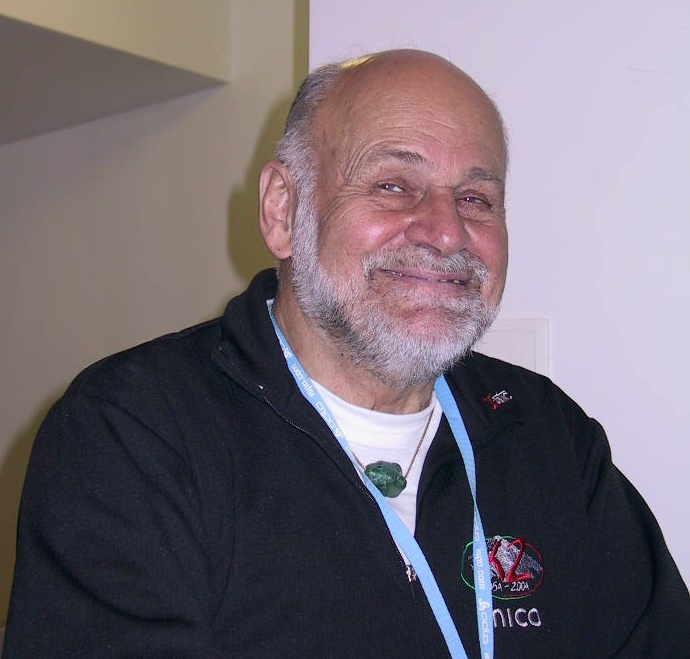
- Kurt Diemberger in 2005

Personal information
- Nationality: Austrian
- Born: 16 March 1932 (age 94) Villach, Carinthia, Austria
- Occupations: Mountaineer, writer

Climbing career
- First ascents: Broad Peak; Dhaulagiri
- Known for: The second person after H. Buhl to make first ascents on two eight-thousanders

Kurt Diemberger (Austrian German pronunciation: [ˈkʊrt ˈdiːmbɛrɡɐ]; born 16 March 1932) is an Austrian mountaineer and author of several books. He is the only living person who has made the first ascents on two mountains over 8,000 metres: of Broad Peak in 1957 and of Dhaulagiri in 1960. In 2013, he won the Piolet d'Or Lifetime Achievement Award.

== Career ==
Diemberger attended university in Vienna, where he obtained two degrees (MBA 1955, M.Ed 1962). Together with Hermann Buhl, he is one of two mountaineers who have successfully made the first ascents on two mountains over 8,000 metres. In 1957, Diemberger was the last person to see Hermann Buhl alive before he fell through a cornice on Chogolisa. This attempt to climb Chogolisa was illegal and subsequently Diemberger was banned from entering Pakistan for an extended period of time.

Diemberger was one of only two survivors in the 1986 K2 Disaster. On 4 August 1986, Diemberger and Julie Tullis reached the summit of K2 very late in the day. Shortly after starting their descent, Tullis fell and dragged Diemberger down with her. They somehow stopped from going over the edge and spent the night above 8,000 metres. They managed to reach Camp IV the next day, where they were forced to share two tents with six other climbers after their tent had collapsed from hurricane force winds. Tullis died later that night, possibly from high altitude cerebral edema, and only one other climber, Austrian Willi Bauer, survived the descent with Diemberger. Both climbers suffered severe frostbite during the descent and had to have amputations.

In 2013, Diemberger won the 5th Piolet d'Or "Lifetime Achievement Award".

Diemberger is still active in the mountaineering world and works on film projects with his daughter, Hildegard.

=== Books ===
Diemberger has written the following books:

- The Endless Knot : K2, Mountain of Dreams and Destiny, 1991. Translated into English by Audrey Salkeld. ISBN 0-89886-300-7
- Summits and secrets, 1991. Translated into English by Hugh Merrick, first published 1971. ISBN 0-89886-307-4
- Spirits of the Air, 1994 ISBN 0-89886-408-9
- K2 : Challenging the Sky, 1997 ISBN 0-89886-518-2
- The Kurt Diemberger Omnibus, 1999 ISBN 1-898573-26-3
- K2. Traum und Schicksal, 2001 (German) ISBN 3-7654-3755-7

== See also ==
- Eight-thousander
- List of 20th-century summiters of Mount Everest
- List of Austrian mountain climbers
