= Julie Tullis =

British climber (1939–1986)

Julie Tullis (née Palau) (15 March 1939 – 6/7 August 1986) was a British climber and filmmaker who died while descending from K2's summit during a storm, along with four other climbers from several expeditions, in what was later termed the 1986 K2 disaster or the "Black Summer" of 1986.

== Early life ==
Julie was born to Erica and Francis Palau, though she was known as Julia as a child. Her early life was disrupted by the outbreak of World War II, evacuated from London with her sister, Rosemary (Zita), moving to Ellingham, in South Norfolk, to stay with George and Winifred Burcham. In 1956, she began climbing near Tunbridge Wells, where she met Terry Tullis. In 1959, they were married and spent the following years running various small businesses. They also continued climbing, in addition to which Julie studied traditional Japanese martial arts, under David Passmore in the Budokan school, Tunbridge Wells. She occasionally practised karate forms in traditional hakama when climbing.

== Mountaineering career ==
Tullis met Austrian climber Kurt Diemberger in 1976, and by 1980 they were working together on lecture tours. In 1981, Diemberger hired Tullis as a technician for an expedition to Nanga Parbat, and their high-altitude filming career began. It would include, in the following years, expeditions to the North ridge of K2 and the unclimbed North-East ridge of Mount Everest. In 1984, Tullis and Diemberger climbed Broad Peak, and after more film work they went on an expedition to climb K2, in 1986, becoming part of the 1986 K2 disaster.

Although Tullis and Diemberger finally made the summit of K2 on 4 August 1986, making Tullis the first British woman to do so, they were exhausted from spending several days above 8,000 metres; 26,000' (known as the death zone). On the descent, Tullis slipped and fell; although Diemberger's belay successfully saved them both, it is likely that Tullis suffered internal or head injuries that began to affect her vision and co-ordination. Arriving at Camp IV they were trapped in their tents by a storm that lasted for several days. All the trapped climbers deteriorated physically and mentally, lacking food, sleep, oxygen and, once the gas for the stoves ran out, the ability to melt snow and produce water. This, in turn, made them vulnerable to pulmonary or cerebral edema, which in Tullis' condition would have been rapidly fatal. Tullis died on the night of 6/7 August (the accounts of Diemberger and another climber present, Willi Bauer, differ on the date) and was buried on the mountainside.

== Notes ==
In 2005, an audio cassette tape diary recorded by Tullis in 1982 was recovered from the glacier below K2.
