= Wanda Rutkiewicz =

Polish mountain climber (1943–1992)

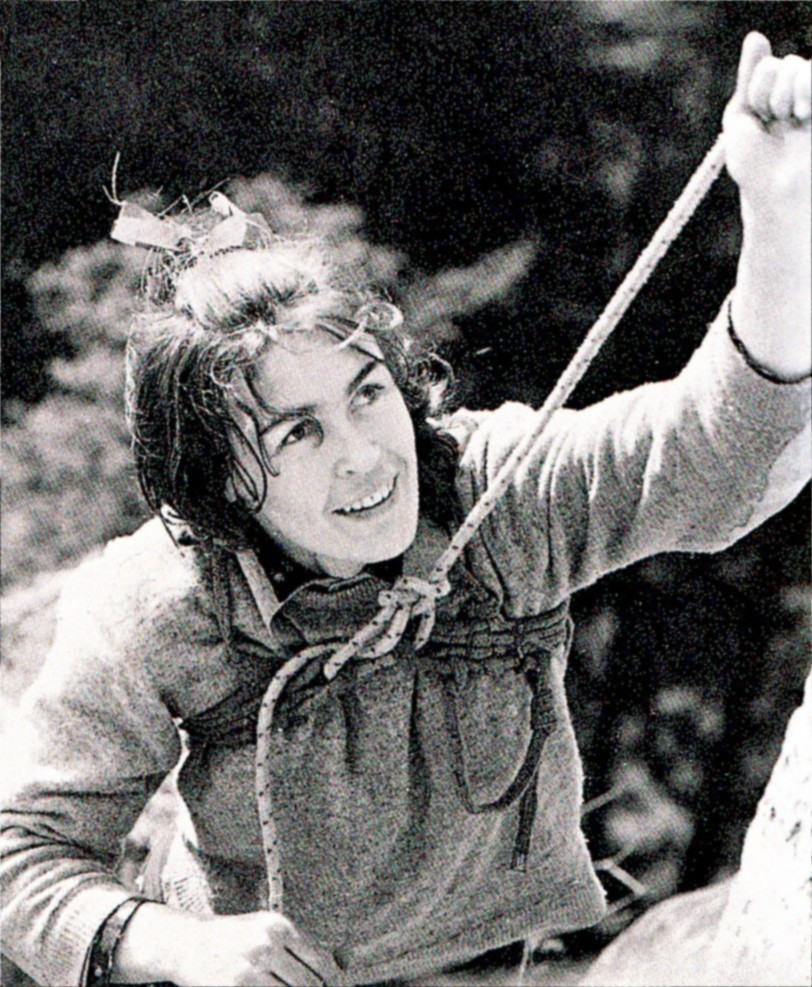
- Wanda Rutkiewicz climbing in the Poland's Sudetes (1968)
- Born: Wanda Błaszkiewicz; 4 February 1943; Plungė, Lithuania
- Died: 13 May 1992 (aged 49); Kangchenjunga, Nepal
- Occupation: Mountaineer
- Known for: First woman to successfully climb K2

Wanda Rutkiewicz (Polish pronunciation: [/ˈvanda rutˈkʲevitʂ/] 4 February 1943 – 12–13 May 1992) was a Polish mountaineer and computer engineer. She was the first woman to reach the summit of K2 and the third woman (first European woman) to summit Mount Everest.

== Early life ==
Wanda Rutkiewicz was born into an educated Polish family in Plungė, Lithuania. Her father, Zbigniew Błaszkiewicz, was an engineer for the Communal Building Projects Bureau (Biuro Projektów Budownictwa Komunalnego). Zbigniew was also a passionate sportsman. He excelled at swimming, shooting, and judo. Maria, her mother, on the other hand, enjoyed reading about Western culture and traveling in the Himalayas. After World War II, her family chose to leave for Poland, first moving to Łańcut before settling in Wrocław in southwestern Poland's Recovered Territories. She was initially homeschooled, but began attending 2nd grade in elementary school in 1949 and joined the 18 Scout Team of the “Zośka” Battalion. When she was five, her seven-year-old brother, Jerzy, was killed in the Szczytnicki Park after he and his friends found an unexploded bomb in post-war Wrocław and threw it into a bonfire.

Rutkiewicz was a multi-sport athlete. While in the elementary school she would practice running with her school's coaches every day before classes started. She trained long jump, discus throw, and high jump. In 1961 she won the gold medal in the Polish University Club Championships in the shot put. As a student in the Politechnic institute, she joined the Academic Sports Union (AZS Wrocław), where she opted to play volleyball. Despite standing at just 168 cm tall, she led AZS Wrocław to the 1965 Summer Universiade in Budapest. Some speculated that Rutkiewicz might have been called up to the national team or even represent Poland in the 1964 Summer Olympics in Tokyo. However, due to her short stature, she decided to give up volleyball and take up climbing. She graduated from Wroclaw University of Technology as an electrical engineer.

Rutkiewicz rode a Junak, the heaviest Polish motorcycle, which indirectly contributed to her interest in climbing. One summer's day in 1961, it ran out of fuel. She started waving to people passing on the road to seek their assistance; a motorcyclist who stopped to help was travelling with a colleague, Bogdan Jankowski, who had been climbing for two years. This chance meeting resulted in them climbing together near Trzcińsko in the Falcon Mountains (Polish: Góry Sokole).

== Climbing career ==
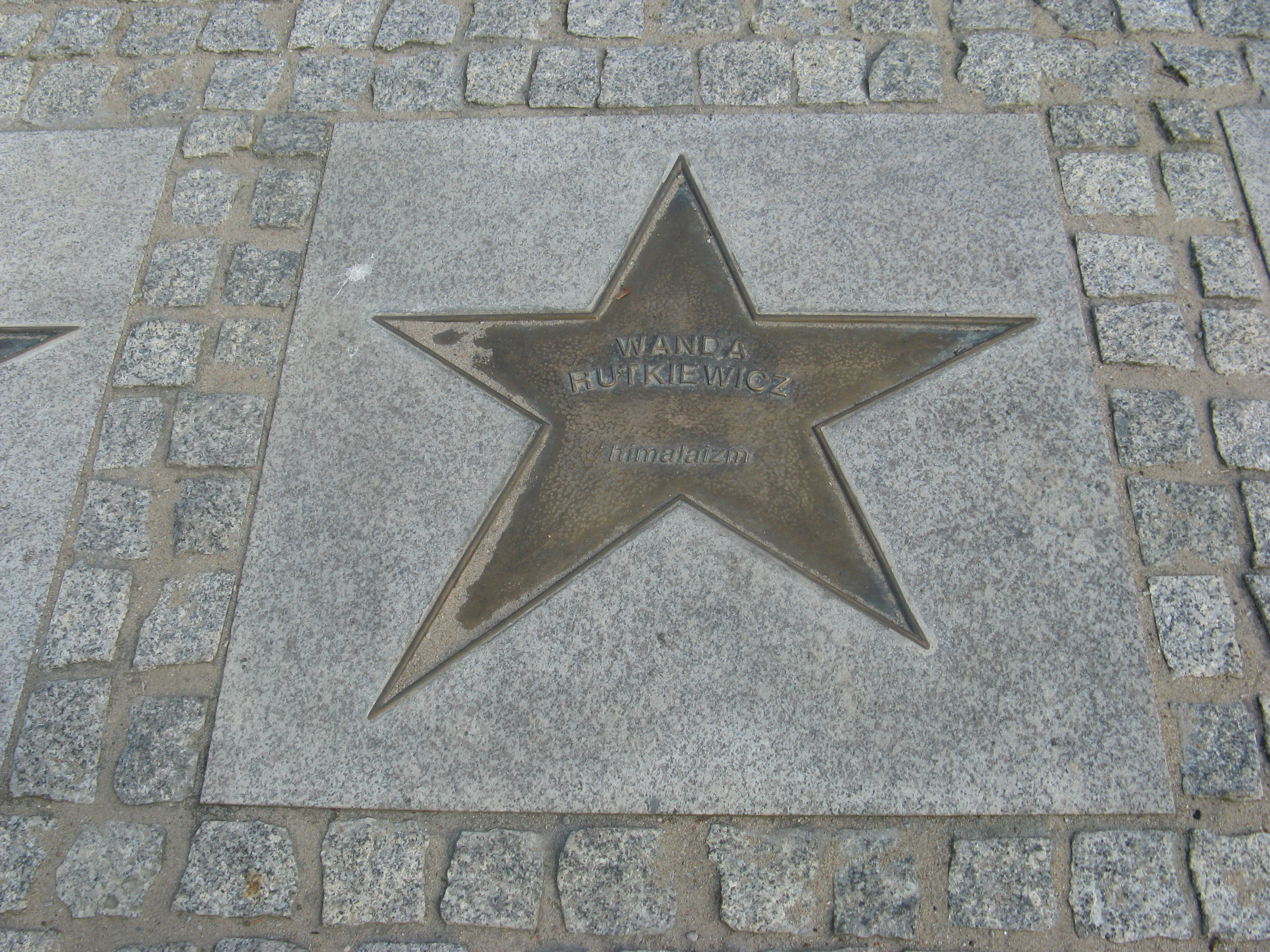
Wanda Rutkiewicz's star on the Sport Walk of Fame in Władysławowo

Her first major expedition was to the Pamir Mountains with Andrzej Zawada, which she found unpleasant due to her difficult relationships with the male climbers.

After returning she began to lead her own expeditions, including a number of all-female ones, and became known for her blunt leadership style. On 16 October 1978, she became the first Pole, the third woman (after Junko Tabei and Phantog in 1975), and the first European woman to reach the summit of Mount Everest. She managed to accomplish this climb despite suffering from anemia. In fact, she carried injections of iron with her, so she could raise her hemoglobin levels to remain conscious during the climb. She reached Mount Everest the same day that her compatriot, Cardinal Karol Wojtyła, whom Rutkiewicz met in 1979, was announced Pope John Paul II. The Pope said of their accomplishments, "The good Lord wanted this--that we rise so high on the same day." In 1986, she became the first woman to successfully climb K2, which she did without supplemental oxygen, as part of a small expedition led by Liliane and Maurice Barrard. Her triumph was marred when both the Barrards died during the descent, becoming two of 13 climbers to die on K2 that summer.

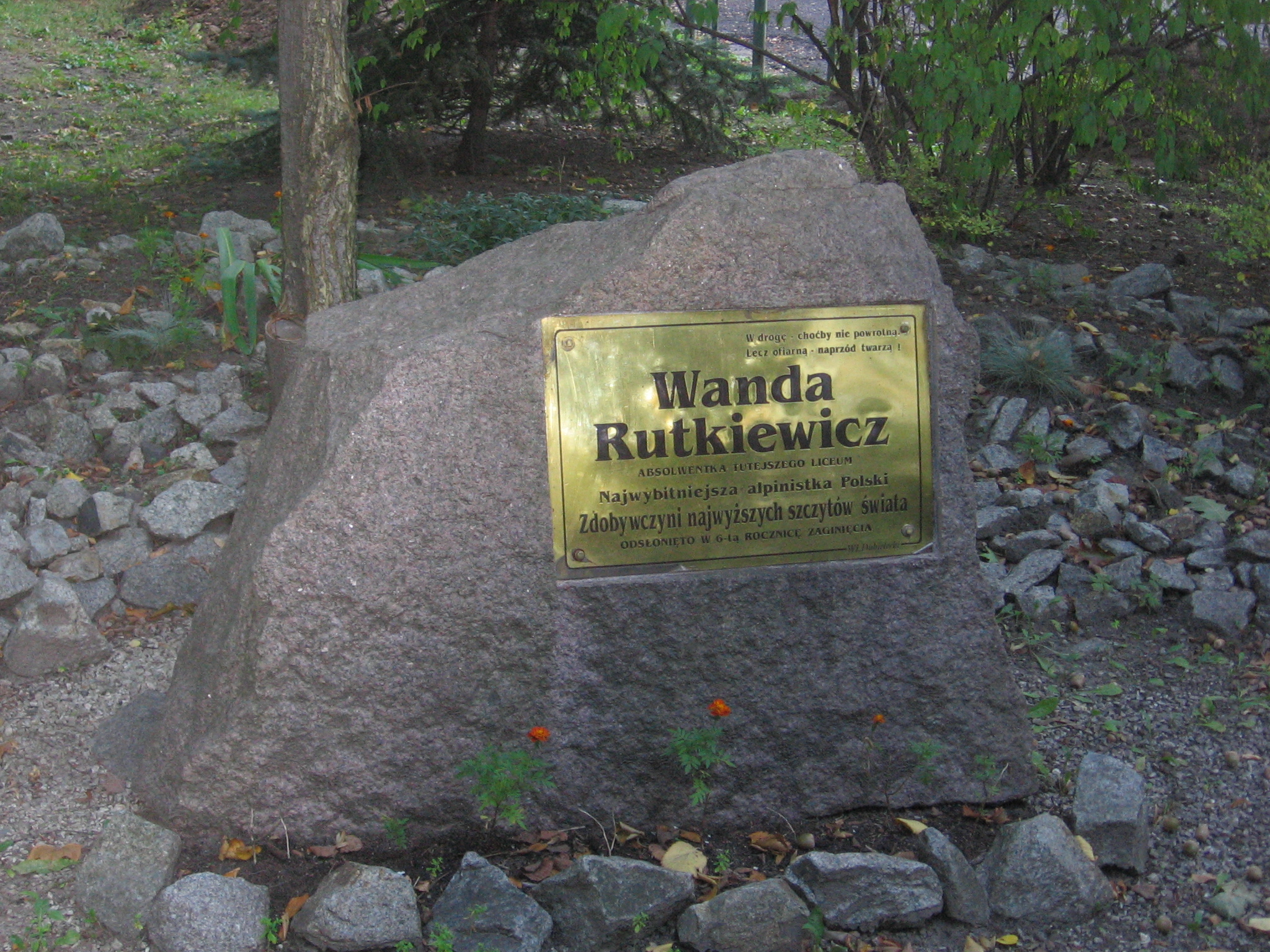
A memorial stone at the entrance to the II LO (The Secondary School #2) in Wrocław

Rutkiewicz's goal was to become the first woman to reach the summits of all 14 of the eight-thousanders. During her climbing career she successfully climbed the following mountains:

- 1975 – Gasherbrum III
- 1978 – Mount Everest
- 1985 – Nanga Parbat
- 1986 – K2
- 1987 – Shishapangma
- 1989 – Gasherbrum II
- 1990 – Gasherbrum I
- 1991 – Cho Oyu
- 1991 – Annapurna I
- 1992 – Kangchenjunga (uncertain)

== Death ==
While climbing Kangchenjunga in 1992, 49-year-old Rutkiewicz was last seen alive by Mexican climber Carlos Carsolio. She was sheltering at high altitude on the north-west face, during her attempted ascent of what would have been her ninth eight-thousander. Despite being physically weakened she decided against descending. Carsolio said he did not have the mental strength to convince her to descend because he was weakened as well.

It was thought that her body had been found on the south-west face of the mountain in 1995 by Fausto de Stefani, Marco Galezzi and Silvio Mondinelli, suggesting that she had climbed up the north-west ridge to a point very close to the summit before falling down the south-west side. However, more detailed analysis of the findings by the Italian climbers, such as colour of clothing and presence of Bulgarian-made tablets with the body, indicate that it was probably the body of Bulgarian climber Yordanka Dimitrova, who was killed by an avalanche on the south-west face of Kangchenjunga in October 1994. It is unknown if Rutkiewicz reached the summit of Kangchenjunga. If she did so, she would have been the first woman to reach the top of the world's three highest mountains. Her body has still not been found.

== Commemoration ==
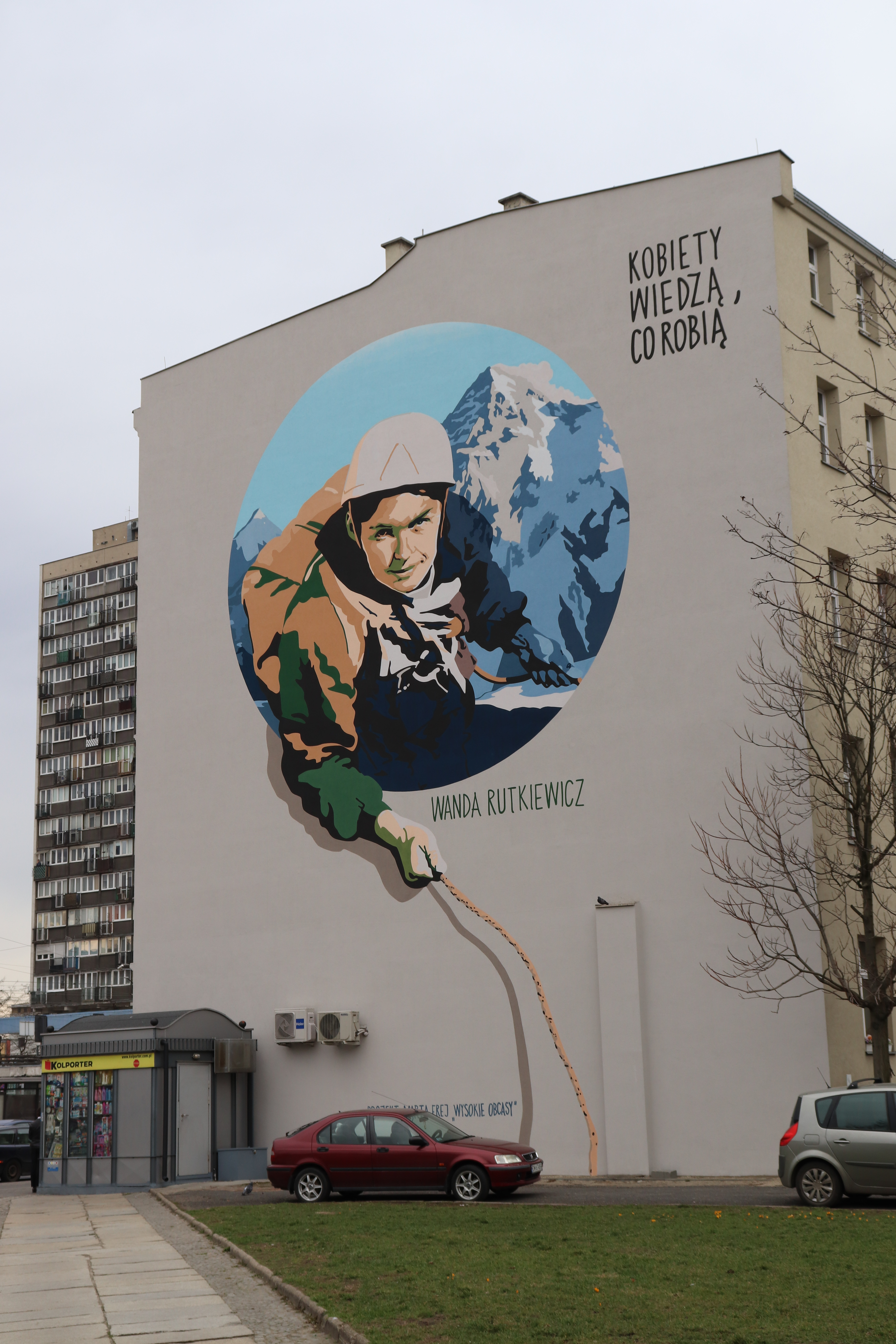
Mural in Wrocław

On 16 October 2019, Rutkiewicz was the subject of the daily Google Doodle on the forty-first anniversary of her ascent of Mount Everest. The image shows her climbing snowy peaks on the railing rope. In October 2021, the Polish Parliament passed a resolution to commemorate the 30th anniversary of her death and named 2022 as the "Year of Wanda Rutkiewicz".

== Bibliography ==
- Reinisch, Gertrude, Wanda Rutkiewicz: A Caravan of Dreams (2000) ISBN 0-9538631-0-7
- Freedom Climbers ISBN 978-1-926855-60-8 Freedom Climbers by Bernadette McDonald

== See also ==
- Catherine Destivelle
