= Wojciech Kurtyka =

Polish mountaineer and rock climber, born 1947

Wojciech Kurtyka (also Voytek Kurtyka, born 25 July 1947, in Skrzynka near Kłodzko) is a Polish mountaineer and rock climber, one of the pioneers of the alpine style of climbing the biggest walls in the Greater Ranges. He lived in Wrocław up to 1974 when he moved to Kraków. He graduated as engineer in electronics (in 1973 at Wrocław University of Technology). In 1985 he climbed the "Shining Wall," the west face of Gasherbrum IV, which Climbing magazine declared to be the greatest achievement of mountaineering in the twentieth century. In 2016, he received the Piolet d'Or for lifetime achievement in mountaineering.

== Career ==
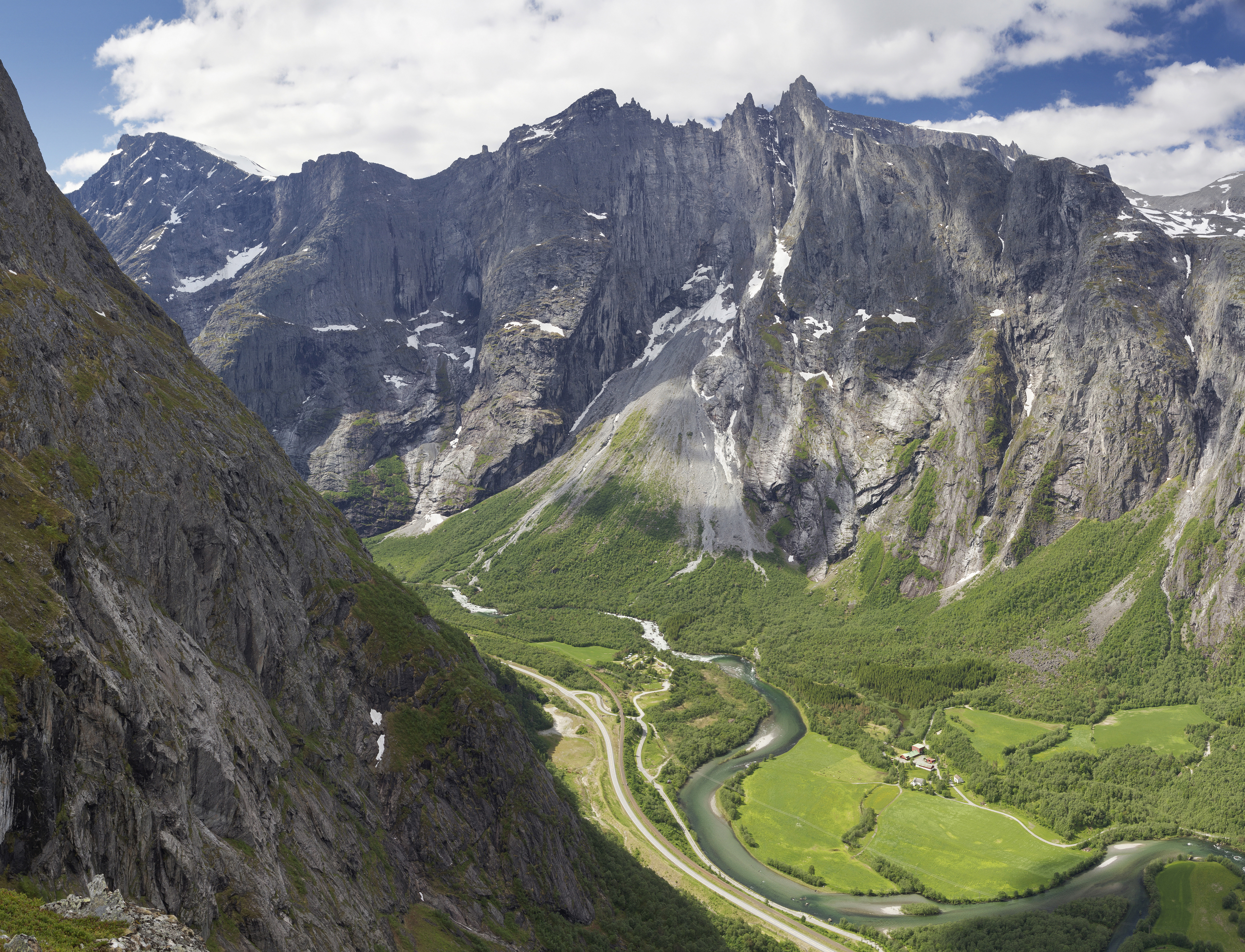
Troll Wall

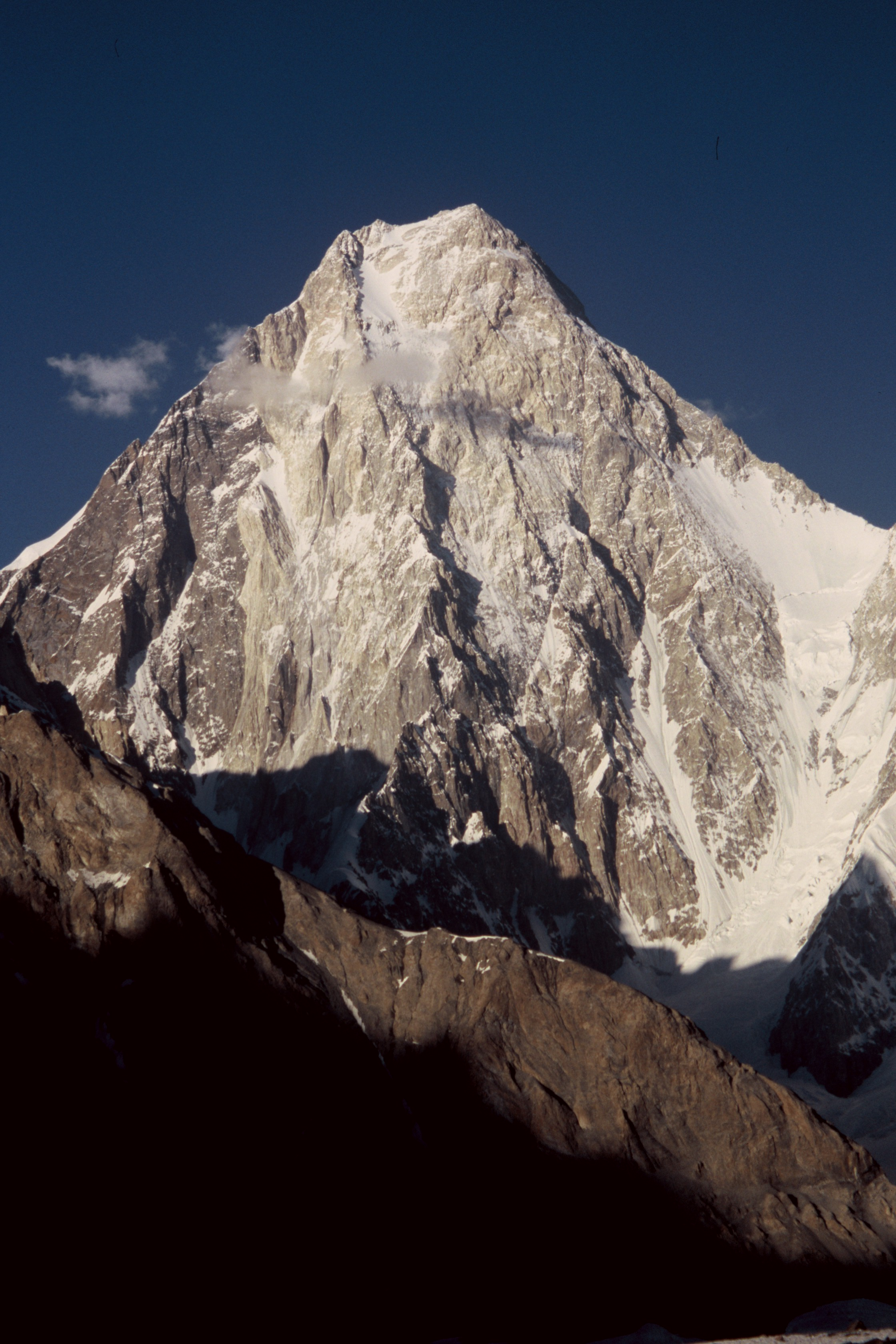
Shining Wall on Gasherbrum IV

His climbs in Poland consist of many difficult climbs – in crags, the hardest free climbs and free solo climbs of the time. In the Tatra Mountains he did a lot of first free ascents, first ascents in winter and established new winter routes.

Kurtyka became well known abroad in early 1973 after achieving the first winter ascent of Trollveggen (Troll Wall) in Norway, the highest vertical cliff on the continent (4 men Polish team, see the list of climbs below). He started in Greater Ranges in 1972, completing a little-known – but important according to him – first ascent of the wall of Akher Chogh in Hindu Kush, in lightweight, alpine style. He started climbing in the Himalayas in 1974. After participating in two big Polish national expeditions in 1974 and 1976, he gradually turned to lightweight expeditions.

His teammates were such world-class Himalayan climbers as, among others, Alex MacIntyre (1977, 1978, 1980, 1981), Jerzy Kukuczka (1981, 1983, 1984), Doug Scott (1993, Nanga Parbat attempt), Erhard Loretan (1988, 1990, 1991, 1997), Reinhold Messner (1982, Cho Oyu winter attempt), Noboru Yamada (1986 Trango Towers attempt), Yasushi Yamanoi (2000, 2001, K2 and Latok attempts).

The ideas of minimal equipment and support even on the most difficult walls and highest peaks was included in his philosophical concept of the "path of the mountain".

Kurtyka's and Robert Schauer's (Austrian) summit attempt of Gasherbrum IV in 1985 which included a climb of the west face (Shining Wall), was selected by Climbing magazine as one of the 10 most impressive climbs of the 20th century (including rock climbing, bouldering etc.).

Besides being a climber, Kurtyka is author of many articles on climbing published in Polish and English. He is also an inventor (around 1980) of the local Polish grading system of free climbs. This system uses an opened scale, called "Kurtyka scale" or "Krakowska scale".

In 2016, he received the Piolet d'Or Carrière (Lifetime Achievement Award).

== Selected climbs ==
=== Rock climbing ===
- New routes up to 8a, 8a+ in Polish crags,
- Free solo ascent of 7c+ route in 1993 - actually probably the hardest free solo climb in Poland

=== European mountains ===
High Tatras

- 1970 – Mały Młynarz (Malý Mlynár in Slovak), NE face, new free route (which opens the grade higher than VI (in UIAA scale); commonly called Kurtykówka), with Michał Gabryel, Janusz Kurczab
- 1972 – Kazalnica, Pająki route (route of the Slovak group "The Spiders"), first winter ascent, with Kazimierz Głazek, Marek Kęsicki
- 1973 – Kocioł Kazalnicy (Kazalnica Cwm, Kazalnica Sanctuary), Superściek (Super Sewer) route, 1st ascent (in winter), with Piotr Jasiński, Krzysztof Pankiewicz, Zbigniew Wach
- 1980 – Kazalnica, Kant Filara (The Edge of The Pillar), first free ascent (actually the hardest free route in the Tatras), with Władysław Janowski
- Kazalnica, other first winter ascents and new routes, 1971, 1992
- 1991 – new routes up to 7c+ in limestone part of Tatras

Mountains of Norway

- 1973 – Trollryggen, N face (Troll Wall), Romsdal Valley, French route (French directissima), first winter ascent, with Marek Kęsicki, Ryszard Kowalewski, Tadeusz Piotrowski (all Polish)

Alps, Mont Blanc Massif

- 1971 – Aiguille Noire, W face, Vitali-Ratti route, first Polish ascent, with Janusz Kurczab
- 1973 – Petit Dru, W face, Directe Americaine, first Polish ascent, with Andrzej Tarnawski
- 1973 – Petit Dru, N face, new route in left part (Voie Petit Jean, to commemorate Jan Franczuk who died during the 1971 Kunyang Chhish expedition), with Jerzy Kukuczka and Marek Łukaszewski
- 1975 – Grandes Jorasses, N face (Pointe Hélène, Polish route), new route, with Jerzy Kukuczka and Marek Łukaszewski

=== Great Ranges ===
- 1972 – Kohe Tez, 7015 m (Hindu Kush, Afghanistan), N ridge, new route, with Alicja Bednarz, Ryszard Kozioł (all Polish)
- 1972 – Akher Chogh, 7025 m or 7017 m (Hindu Kush, Afghanistan), NW face, new route, with Jacek Rusiecki, Marek Kowalczyk, Piotr Jasiński (all Polish)
- 1974 – Lhotse 8516 m, member of the first winter (autumn to winter) expedition (Andrzej Zawada, leader, and Andrzej Heinrich on 27 December reached height ca. 8250 m)
- 1976 – K2, 8611 m, East ridge, attempt (Kurtyka reached ca. 7900 m, the highest point reached by expedition ca. 8400 m (Eugeniusz Chrobak, Wojciech Wróż - this long route was finished to the summit - via a diversion of the top section of the Abruzzi Ridge - in 1978 by American expedition led by James Whittaker). The complete line to the summit via the NE-Ridge is as yet virgin.
- 1977 – Kohe Bandaka, 6868 m (Hindu Kush, Afghanistan), NE face, new route, with Alex MacIntyre and John Porter
- 1978 – Changabang, 6864 m (Garhwal Himalaya, India), S face direct, new route, with Alex MacIntyre, John Porter and Krzysztof Żurek (Polish)
- 1981 – Makalu, 8481 m, West face, two attempts of direct new route (during the second, in autumn, they reached ca. 7900 m), with Jerzy Kukuczka, Alex MacIntyre (later Kukuczka reached the summit in solo climb via the variation of the normal route)
- 1982 – Cho Oyu, winter attempt, with Reinhold Messner
- 1985 – Gasherbrum IV, 7925 m (Baltoro, Karakoram), West face (Shining Wall), first ascent, alpine style, (not to the summit), with Robert Schauer (Austrian)
- 1988 – Trango (Nameless) Tower, 6239 m (Baltoro, Karakoram), E face, new route, with Erhard Loretan
- 1987-2000 – K2, W face, several (4 or 5) attempts, up to 6650 m (1994)
- 1993, 1997 – Nanga Parbat, 8126 m, Mazeno Ridge, attempts
- 1995 – Losar, 700 m high icefall above Namche Bazaar, Nepal, 2nd ascent, with Maciej Rysula (Polish)
- 2001 – Central Biacherahi Tower, ca. 5700 m (Choktoi Glacier, Karakoram, S face, new route (Japanese-Polish Picnic), with Taeko and Yasushi Yamanoi (during attempts to Latok I N buttress)

=== Eight-thousanders ===
1. 1980 – Dhaulagiri - East face, new route, alpine style (not to the summit), with René Ghilini (Swiss), Alex MacIntyre and Ludwik Wilczyński (Polish)
2. 1982 – Broad Peak - normal route, alpine style, with Jerzy Kukuczka
3. 1983 – Gasherbrum I, Gasherbrum II - two new routes, alpine style, with Jerzy Kukuczka (Polish Alex MacIntyre Memorial Expedition)
4. 1984 – Broad Peak - Traverse of all three Broad Peak summits, North (new route), Middle (or Central) and Main, alpine style, with Jerzy Kukuczka
5. 1990 – Cho Oyu - SW face, new route, alpine style, with Erhard Loretan and Jean Troillet
6. 1990 – Shisha Pangma, central summit 8008 m, S face, new route, alpine style, with Erhard Loretan and Jean Troillet

== Bibliography ==
=== Self-authored articles in English ===
- The Gasherbrums Are Lonely, Mountain, No. 97, May/June 1984
- The Abseil and the Ascent, The Art of Abseiling into the Hell, The Himalayan Journal, Vol. 42, 1985
- "The Shining Wall of Gasherbrum IV". American Alpine Journal. 28 (60). American Alpine Club: 1–5. 1986.
- The Path of the Mountain, Alpinism, Vol. 1, 1986
- Broad Peak North Ridge, Climbing, No. 94, February 1986
- The Art of Suffering, Mountain, No. 121, May/June 1988
- "The East Face of Trango's Nameless Tower". American Alpine Journal. 31 (63). American Alpine Club: 45–49. 1989.
- Trango Extremes, Mountain, No. 127, May/June 1989, pp. 22–27
- "New Routes, Cho Oyu and Shisha Pangma". American Alpine Journal. 33 (65). American Alpine Club: 14–18. 1991.
- The Polish Syndrome, Mountain Review, No. 5, November/December 1993, pp. 36–47
- The Polish Syndrome, [as a chapter in:] Chris Bonington, Audrey Salkeld (editors), Great Climbs: a celebration of world mountaineering, Publ. Mitchell Beazley, London 1994; Chris Bonington, Audrey Salkeld (editors), Heroic climbs: a celebration of world mountaineering, The Mountaineers, Seattle 1994
- The Shining Wall, Alpinist, No. 2, Spring 2003
- Losar, Alpinist, No. 4, Autumn 2003

=== Other sources ===
- Marek Brniak, Troll Wall in Winter, Summit, October 1976 (and Climber&Rambler, March 1976)
- Porter, John (1979). "Bandaka and Changabang". American Alpine Journal. 22 (1). American Alpine Club.; Changabang South Buttress, Climbing, No 55, 1979; South Side Story, Mountain, No. 65, January/February 1979
- MacIntyre, Alex (1981). "Dhaulagiri's East Face, Nick Estcourt Memorial Expedition". American Alpine Journal. 23 (55). American Alpine Club.; Broken English, Mountain, No. 77, January/February 1981
- Biacherahi Central, High, No. 234, May 2002 (Mountain Info, edited by Lindsay Griffin, with info from climbers, p. 67-68, with topo of the massif)

Interviews with, and broad articles on Wojciech Kurtyka

- Nicholas O’Connell, Beyond Risk. Conversations with Climbers, chapter X, The Mountaineers, Seattle 1993
- Greg Child, Between the Hammer and the Anvil. The Art of Suffering, Climbing, No. 115, Aug/Sept 1989, pp. 78–86 [in the set of three articles, "profiles of three Polish superstars", Kurtyka, Wanda Rutkiewicz and Jerzy Kukuczka, up to p. 93]
