= Lhotse (disambiguation) =

Lhotse may refer to:

- Lhotse, the fourth highest mountain in the world located in Nepal and Tibet
- Lhotse Shar, a subsidiary mountain of Lhotse
- Lhotse Middle, a subsidiary peak to Lhotse
- Lhotse Shar Glacier, a glacier of the Himalayas in the Solukhumbu District of Nepal
