= Andrzej Zawada =

Polish mountaineer (1928–2000)

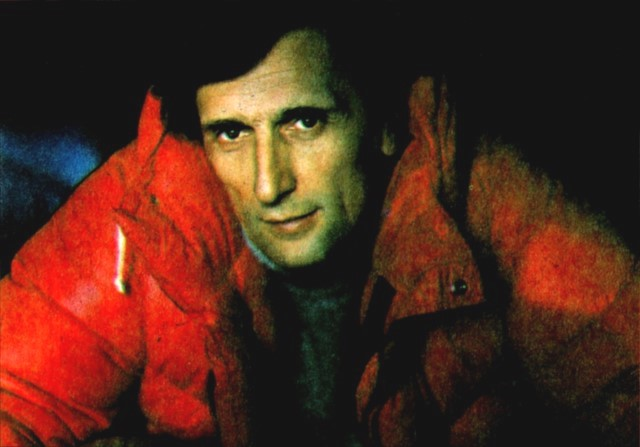
- Zawada during the Mount Everest winter expedition (1979/1980)

Personal information
- Nationality: Polish
- Born: Maria Andrzej Zawada; 16 July 1928 Olsztyn, Poland
- Died: 21 August 2000 (aged 72) Warsaw, Poland
- Parent: Filip Rawicz Zawada

Andrzej Zawada (born Maria Andrzej Zawada; 16 July 1928 – 21 August 2000) was a Polish mountaineer, expedition leader and pioneer of winter Himalayism. Zawada was an organiser and leader of numerous high-mountains expeditions, author of movies and photographs from expeditions, and co-author of Alpinist books. He was an honorary member of the British Alpine Club, French Groupe de Haute Montagne and The Explorers Club in the United States.

He was a grandson of Tomasz Rawicz-Zawada, a young participant of the January Uprising in 1863, and son of Filip Zawada, a Polish legionnaire and consul.

== Geophysics ==
Zawada studied physics and geophysics in Wrocław and Warsaw where he received a degree in seismology. From 1955–1993 he worked at the Institute of Geophysics of the Polish Academy of Sciences.

In 1956 the geophysicist Roman Teisseyre asked Zawada to join him on a Polish scientific expedition to Vietnam, as part of the International Geophysical Year (1957–58). The team also included Krzysztof Haman, Zawada acted as the expedition's film-maker. That led to an invitation to join the Polish Research Expedition to Spitsbergen, 1957-1958 which was based at the newly established Polish Polar Station, Hornsund.

== Selected expeditions ==
- In 1959, he was part of the expedition team with Kazimierz Olech who made the first successful winter crossing of the main ridge of Tatra Mountains, which took 19 days.
- In 1971, as chief he led the Polish expedition to make the first ascent to the Khunyang Chhish (7,852 m, 25,761 ft) in the Karakoram. He also reached the summit.
- With Tadeusz Piotrowski he made the first winter ascent of Noshaq (7,492 m, 24,580 ft) in the Hindu Kush (13 February 1973). It was the world's first winter climb above 7,000 metres (23,000 ft).
- On 25 December 1974, Zawada became the first man in the world to exceed a height of 8,000 metres (26,000 ft) in the winter, alongside Zygmunt Andrzej Heinrich, by reaching a height of 8,250 metres (27,070 ft) on Lhotse.
- In 1977, Zawada made the first crossing of the 1,600-metre (5,200 ft) north wall of Koh-i Mandaras (6,631 m, 21,755 ft).
- In February 1980, Krzysztof Wielicki and Leszek Cichy made the first winter ascent of Mount Everest (8,848 m, 29,029 ft), the highest mountain on Earth. Zawada led the expedition. It was the first winter ascent of a peak above 8,000 m.
- In May 1980, Zawada led an expedition of Everest with Andrzej Czok and Jerzy Kukuczka and ascended a new route.
- In February 1985 Maciej Berbeka and Maciej Pawlikowski made the first winter ascent of Cho Oyu. It is the only winter ascent on an eight-thousander using a new route. Zawada led the expedition.
- On December 31, 1988 Zawada led the expedition where Krzysztof Wielicki made the first successful winter ascent of Lhotse.

== Books ==
- Marcinek, Kazimierz; Zawada, Andrzej (1973). Ostatni atak na Kunyang Chhish (in Polish). Warsaw: Wydawnictwo Sport i Turystyka. OCLC 7233551.
