= Lhotse =

4th-highest mountain on Earth

- Nepali: ल्होत्से Standard Tibetan: ལྷོ་རྩེ
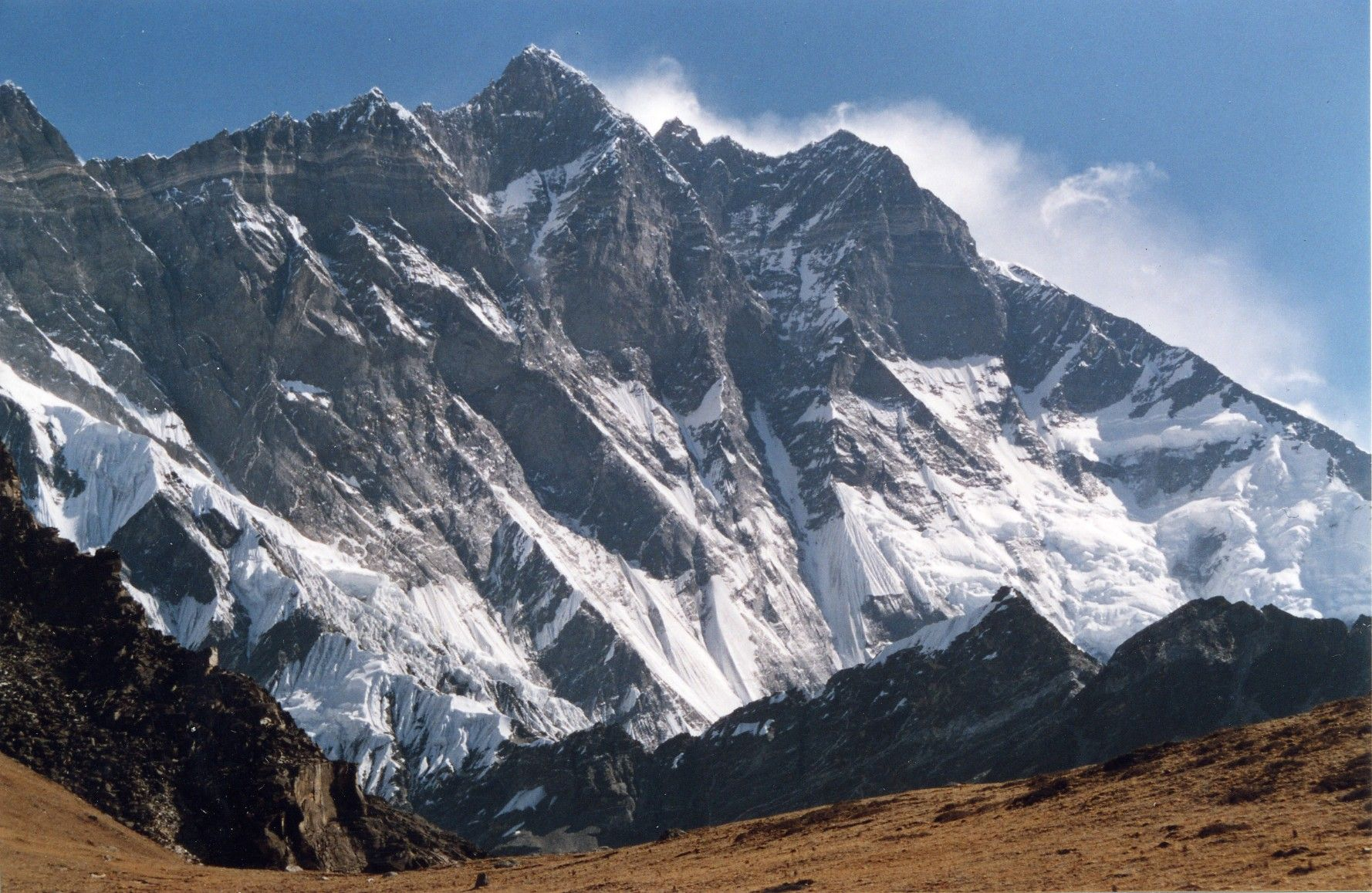
- The South Face of Lhotse as seen from the climb up to Chukhung Ri

Highest point
- Elevation: 8,516 m (27,940 ft) (Note: An elevation of 8,501 m (27,890 ft) is sometimes given, but official Nepalese and Chinese mapping agree on 8,516 m (27,940 ft).); Ranked 4th
- Prominence: 610 m (2,000 ft)
- Listing: Eight-thousander
- Coordinates: 27°57′42″N 86°56′00″E

Geography
- The major peaks (not mountains) above 7,500 m (24,600 ft) height in Himalayas, rank identified in Himalayas alone (not the world). Legend: 1：Mount Everest; 2：Kangchenjunga; 3：Lhotse; 4：Yalung Kang, Kanchenjunga West; 5：Makalu; 6：Kangchenjunga South; 7：Kangchenjunga Central; 8：Cho Oyu; 9：Dhaulagiri; 10：Manaslu (Kutang); 11：Nanga Parbat (Diamer); 12：Annapurna; 13：Shishapangma (Shishasbangma, Xixiabangma); 14：Manaslu East; 15：Annapurna East Peak; 16： Gyachung Kang; 17：Annapurna II; 18：Tenzing Peak (Ngojumba Kang, Ngozumpa Kang, Ngojumba Ri); 19：Kangbachen; 20：Himalchuli (Himal Chuli); 21：Ngadi Chuli (Peak 29, Dakura, Dakum, Dunapurna); 22：Nuptse (Nubtse); 23：Nanda Devi; 24：Chomo Lonzo (Chomolonzo, Chomolönzo, Chomo Lönzo, Jomolönzo, Lhamalangcho); 25：Namcha Barwa (Namchabarwa); 26：Zemu Kang (Zemu Gap Peak); 27：Kamet; 28：Dhaulagiri II; 29：Ngojumba Kang II; 30：Dhaulagiri III; 31：Kumbhakarna Mountain (Mount Kumbhakarna, Jannu); 32：Gurla Mandhata (Naimona'nyi, Namu Nan); 33：Hillary Peak (Ngojumba Kang III); 34：Molamenqing (Phola Gangchen); 35：Dhaulagiri IV; 36：Annapurna Fang; 37：Silver Crag; 38：Kangbachen Southwest; 39：Gangkhar Puensum (Gangkar Punsum); 40：Annapurna III; 41：Himalchuli West; 42：Annapurna IV; 43：Kula Kangri; 44：Liankang Kangri (Gangkhar Puensum North, Liangkang Kangri); 45：Ngadi Chuli South
- Location: Solukhumbu District, Koshi Province, Nepal; Tingri County, Shigatse Prefecture, Tibet Autonomous Region, China
- Parent range: Mahalangur Himal, Himalayas

Climbing
- First ascent: 18 May 1956; Fritz Luchsinger, Ernst Reiss (First winter ascent 31 December 1988 Krzysztof Wielicki)
- Easiest route: glacier/snow/ice climb

Lhotse
- Traditional Chinese: 洛子峰
- Simplified Chinese: 洛子峰
Transcriptions

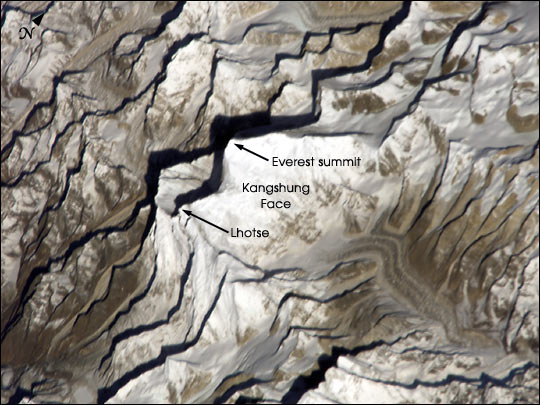
Kangshung Face as seen from the ISS

Lhotse (Nepali: ल्होत्से, romanized: L'hōtsē [lotse]; Standard Tibetan: ལྷོ་རྩེ, romanized: lho tse, lit. 'South Peak' [l̥otse]; Chinese: 洛子峰) is the fourth-highest mountain on Earth, after Mount Everest, K2, and Kangchenjunga. At an elevation of 8,516 metres (27,940 ft) above sea level, the main summit is on the border between the Tibet Autonomous Region of China and the Khumbu region of Nepal.

With Everest to the north and Nuptse to the west, Lhotse forms the apex of the massive horseshoe-shaped arc of the Everest massif. Despite the tremendous vertical relief of its South and Northeast Faces, it is the least prominent of the eight-thousanders due to the great height of the South Col between it and Everest. Lhotse's Western Face, recessed behind the head of the Khumbu Glacier in the Western Cwm, plays an integral part in the standard routes of ascent for both peaks. The name Lhotse, which means "South Peak" in Tibetan, further emphasizes the close relationship between the two.

The main ridge of the mountain features four distinct summits: Lhotse Main at 8,516 m (27,940 ft) AMSL, Lhotse Middle (also called Lhotse Central I or Lhotse East) at 8,414 m (27,605 ft), Lhotse Central II at 8,372 m (27,467 ft), and Lhotse Shar at 8,383 m (27,503 ft).

== Climbing information ==
The Lhotse standard climbing route follows the same path as Everest's South Col route up to the Yellow Band beyond Camp 3. After the Yellow Band, the routes diverge with climbers bound for Everest taking a left over the Geneva Spur up to the South Col, while Lhotse climbers take a right further up the Lhotse face. The last part to the summit leads through the narrow "Reiss couloir" until the Lhotse main peak is reached.

Although Lhotse Main is considered to be an intermediately difficult eight-thousander when ascended from the standard Reiss Couloir route, its secondary summits and extremely steep South Face are regarded as some of the most difficult and dangerous climbs in the world. Its icy North East Face remains unclimbed.

=== Lhotse Face ===
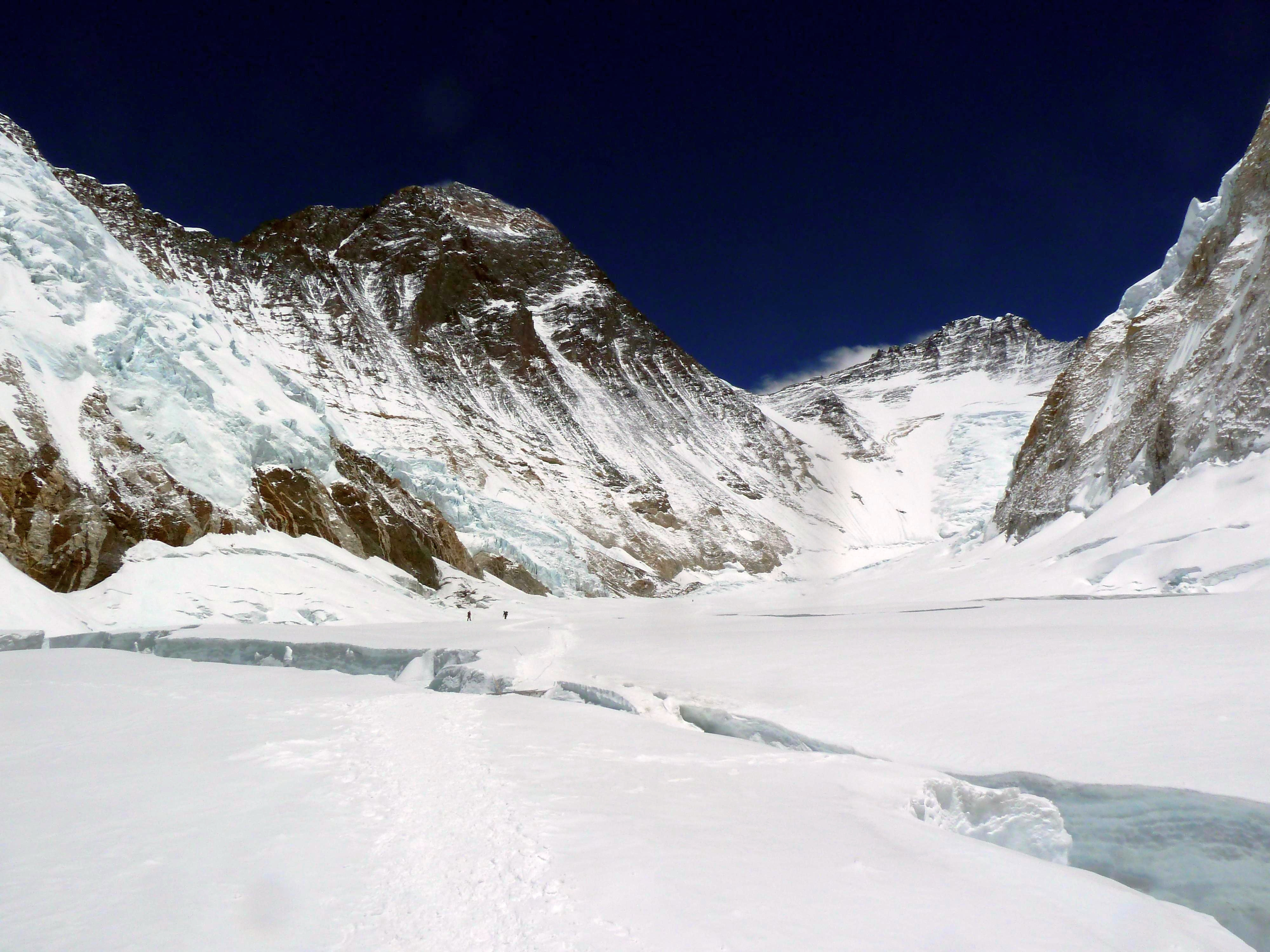
The Western Cwm. The Lhotse Face (centre right) is connected to Mount Everest (centre left) by the South Col (centre, lowest point on horizon).

The western flank of Lhotse is known as the Lhotse Face. Any climber bound for the South Col on Everest must climb this 1,125 m (3,690 ft) wall of glacial blue ice. This face rises at 40 and 50-degree pitches with the occasional 80-degree bulges. High-altitude climbing Sherpas and the lead climbers will set fixed ropes up this wall of ice. Climbers and porters need to establish a good rhythm of foot placement and pull themselves up the ropes using their jumars. Two rocky sections called the Yellow Band and the Geneva Spur interrupt the icy ascent on the upper part of the face.

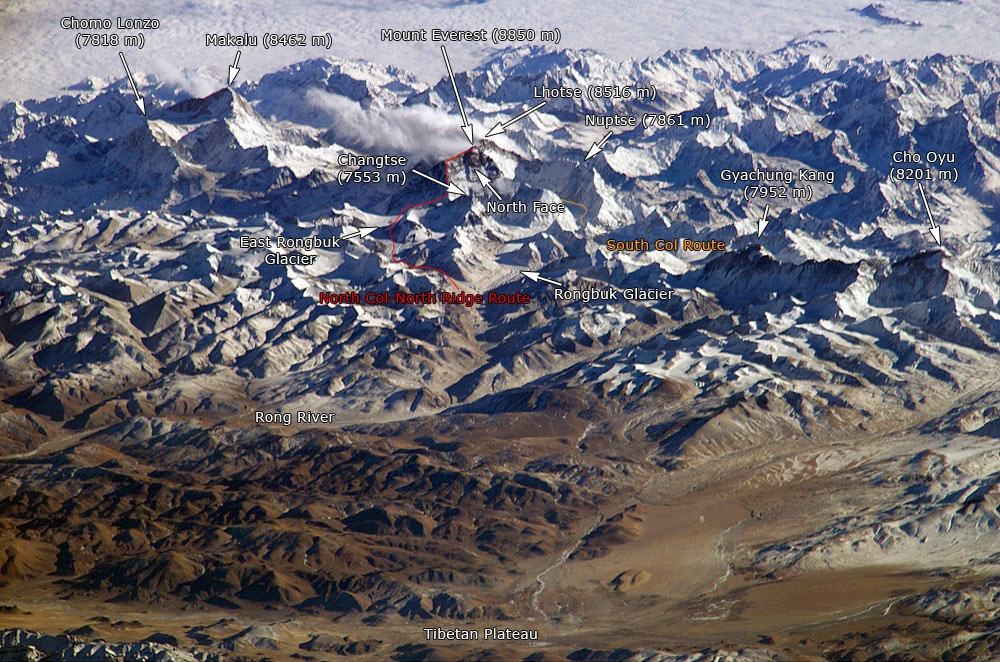

Southern and northern climbing routes as seen from the International Space Station. (The names on the photo are links to corresponding pages.)

=== From Gokyo Ri ===
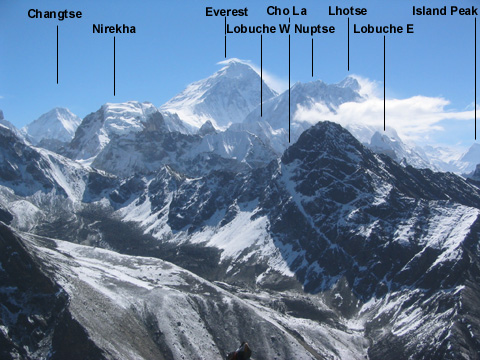
Annotated image of Lhotse and surroundings as seen from Gokyo Ri

== History ==
An early attempt on Lhotse was made by the 1955 International Himalayan Expedition, headed by Norman Dyhrenfurth. It also included two Austrians (cartographers Erwin Schneider and Ernst Senn) and two Swiss (Bruno Spirig and Arthur Spöhel), and was the first expedition in the Everest area to include Americans (Fred Beckey, George Bell, and Richard McGowan). The Nepalese liaison officer was Gaya Nanda Vaidya. They were accompanied by 200 local porters and several climbing Sherpas. After a brief look at the dangerous southern approaches of Lhotse Shar, they turned their attention, during September and October, to the Western Cwm and the northwest face of Lhotse, on which they achieved an altitude of about 8,100 metres (26,600 ft). They were beaten back by unexpectedly strong wind and low temperatures. Under Schneider's direction, they completed the first map of the Everest area (1:50,000 photogrammetric). The expedition also made several short films covering local cultural topics and made a number of first ascents of smaller peaks in the Khumbu region.

The main summit of Lhotse was first climbed on 18 May 1956, by the Swiss team of Ernst Reiss and Fritz Luchsinger, members of the Swiss Mount Everest/Lhotse Expedition.

On 12 May 1970, Sepp Mayerl and Rolf Walter of Austria made the first ascent of Lhotse Shar.

On 12 May 1999 Czech climber Soňa Vomáčková reached the main summit and thus became the first woman to reach it without supplemental oxygen.

Lhotse Middle remained, for a long time, the highest unclimbed named point on Earth; its first ascent was made on 23 May 2001 by Eugeny Vinogradsky, Sergei Timofeev, Alexei Bolotov and Petr Kuznetsov of a Russian expedition.

By December 2008, 371 climbers had summited Lhotse while 20 had died during their attempt. Lhotse was not summited in 2014, 2015, or 2016 due to a series of incidents. It was next summited in May 2017.

It is possible to climb to the summit of Lhotse, then along the South Col to the summit of Everest, in less than 24 hours. In certain mountaineering circles, this rare (and seldom recorded) feat is known as the "Double Crown"; the first attempt recorded in the below section is by Michael Horst in 2011, while Mingma Dorchi Sherpa holds the record for fastest traverse between the two summits at 6 hours and 1 minute, made in 2019, and Nirmal Purja holds the record for fastest such traverse without supplemental oxygen at 13 hours and 42 minutes, made in 2026.

=== Timeline ===
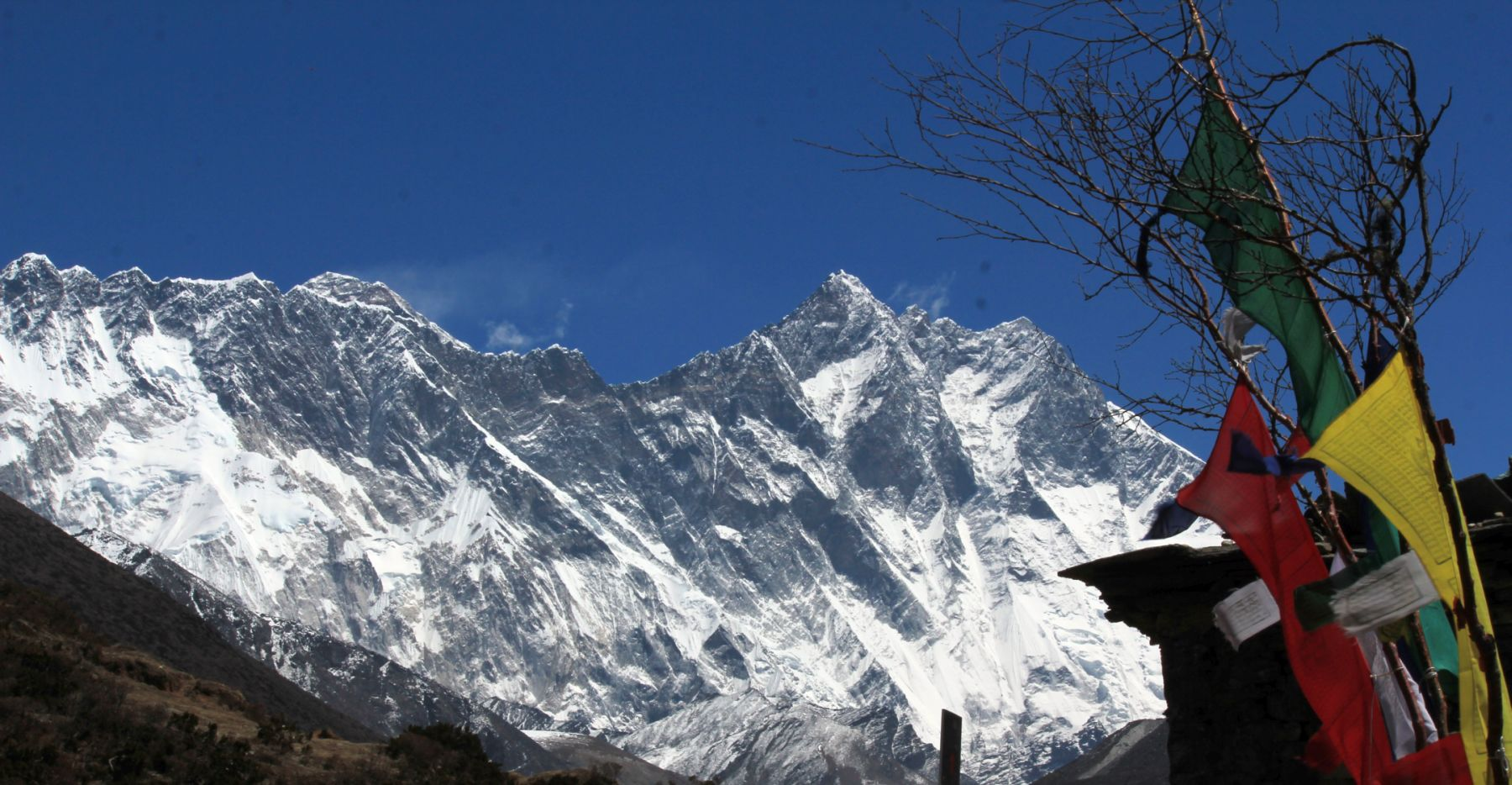
Nuptse Ridge, Everest, Lhotse, and Lhotse Shar peaks

- 1955: attempt by the International Himalayan Expedition.
- 1956: on May 18, the first ascent of the main summit was made by Fritz Luchsinger and Ernst Reiss.
- 1965: the first attempt on Lhotse Shar by a Japanese expedition reached 8,100 m (26,570 ft).
- 1970: on May 12, the first ascent of Lhotse Shar was made by an Austrian expedition, Sepp Mayerl, Rolf Walter.
- 1973: the first attempt on the South Face by a Japanese expedition was led by Ryohei Uchida.
- 1974: on 25 December, a team attempting an eight-thousander in winter managed to climb above 8000 m for the first time. Polish climbers Andrzej Zawada and Andrzej Heinrich reached a height of 8,250 meters (27,070 feet).
- 1975: an attempt on the South Face was made by Reinhold Messner.
- 1977: a second ascent of the main summit by a German expedition was led by Dr. G. Schmatz.
- 1979: an ascent of the main summit was made by Andrzej Czok and Jerzy Kukuczka without the use of supplemental oxygen (Kukuczka's first conquered eight-thousander, and eventually the last one to climb 10 years later). The ascent was made was in company of Zygmunt Andrzej Heinrich and Janusz Skorek. Four days later a second group climbed to the peak - Janusz Baranek, Adam Bilczewski, Stanisław Cholewa, Robert Niklas. Leszek S. Czarnecki climbed with the group without the use of supplemental oxygen, but carrying the oxygen to elevation of 8350 m, where he was forced to turn back due to inclement weather.
- 1980: on April 27 an attempt on Lhotse Shar was made by the French climber Nicolas Jaeger, last seen at 8,200 metres (26,900 ft).
- 1981: an attempt on the South Face was made by a Yugoslavian expedition led by Aleš Kunaver. Vanja Matijevec and Franček Knez reached the top of the Face but not the summit.
- 1981: on 30 April, the first solo ascent without the use of supplement oxygen of the main summit by Hristo Prodanov, was made as part of the first Bulgarian Himalayan expedition.
- 1981: on 16 October, the second ascent of Lhotse Shar was made by Colin Molines.
- 1984: on May 20 and 21, members of the Czechoslovak expedition led by Ivan Galfy climbed the South Face of Lhotse Shar for the first time (third overall ascent of Lhotse Shar).
- 1986: on 16 October, an ascent by Reinhold Messner concluded, thus he became the first person to climb all of the fourteen eight-thousanders.
- 1987: on 21 May, the Brazilian Otto William Gerstenberger Junior and the Swiss Haans Singera reached the summit.
- 1988: on 31 December, Krzysztof Wielicki, a Polish climber, completed the first winter ascent of Lhotse.
- 1989: on 24 October Jerzy Kukuczka died while climbing the South Face when his secondhand rope broke. An international expedition led by Reinhold Messner to climb the South Face was unsuccessful.
- 1990: on 24 April, Tomo Česen from Slovenia, made a first solo ascent of the South Face of Lhotse. Controversy of his climb was later raised by the Soviet Himalayan expedition, claiming that his ascent would be impossible. Reinhold Messner would also raise doubts.
- 1990: on 16 October, in severe weather conditions, by the Soviet Himalayan expedition members climbing pair Sergey Bershov and Vladimir Karataev reached the summit via a record first ascent of the South Face, while Igor Svergun reached 8,200m.
- 1994: Carlos Carsolio ascended to the mountaintop solo, introducing a world speed record at 23 hours 50 minutes from Base Camp to the summit.
- 1996:
  - on 10 May Chantal Mauduit became the first woman to reach the summit of Lhotse.
  - on 17 May Anatoli Boukreev made a solo ascent, with a world speed record at 21 hours 16 minutes from Base Camp to summit without supplemental oxygen; he had summited Everest the week before.
- 1997: an attempt to climb Lhotse Middle via the ridge between the main summit and Lhotse Shar by a Russian expedition, led by Vladimir Bashkirov, who died in the attempt, failed just below the main summit.
- 1999: an attempt to climb Lhotse Middle and traverse the three summits by a Russian team, failed due to bad weather.
- 2001: on 23 May, the first ascent of Lhotse Middle by a Russian expedition concludes.
- 2007: Pemba Doma Sherpa, Nepali mountaineer and two-time summiter of Mount Everest, fell to her death from Lhotse at 8,000 m. The fall was witnessed by Australian mountaineer Philip Ling who was also climbing the mountain. Two other Sherpas also perished while trailing a group of clients during a snowstorm.
- 2011:
  - on 14–15 May, Michael Horst, an American guide, summited Mount Everest and Lhotse without descending below Camp IV (South Col), with less than 21 hours elapsing between the two summits. First sub-24-hour Double Crown ascent.
  - on 20 May, Indian mountaineer Arjun Vajpai became the youngest climber ever to summit Lhotse, aged 17 years, 11 months and 16 days.
- 2016: on 19 May, a high-altitude mountain worker, Ang Furba Sherpa, died when he slipped and fell down the Lhotse face.
- 2017: on 19 May, Belgian Stef 'Wolf' Wolfsput became the first person with a disability to climb to the summit of Lhotse and only the second Belgian. He suffers a paralysed leg.
- 2018:
  - on 22 May, Mexican climber José Luis Sánchez Fernández became the first Latin American to summit both Mount Everest and Lhotse in less than 24 hours.
  - on 30 September, Hilaree Nelson and Jim Morrison completed the first ski descent from the summit of Lhotse.
- 2019:
  - on 23 May, Juan Pablo Mohr Prieto became the first Chilean to ascend both Lhotse and Everest without supplemental oxygen, taking 164 hours and inventing a new Guinness world record.
  - on 27 May, Mingma Dorchi Sherpa set the Guinness world record for fastest ever Double Crown ascent of Lhotse and Everest, with a traverse time between summits of 6 hours and 1 minute, using supplemental oxygen.
- 2022: on 16 May, Nirmal Purja made the Double Crown climb in 25 hours and 1 minute, setting the record for fastest ascent without supplemental oxygen.
- 2023: Norwegian Kristin Harila set the record for fastest Double Crown traverse by a woman, eight hours between the summits.
- 2024:
  - on 21 May, Höskuldur Tryggvason climbed both Mount Everest and Lhotse within less than 24 hours, the first Icelander to do so.
  - on 23 May, Polish climber Piotr Jerzy Krzyzowski also made the Double Crown ascent, without supplemental oxygen, in a new record time of 47 hours and 22 minutes.
- 2025: on 21 May, Canadian Jocelyn Cayer and his guide Ashish were recorded as making the Double Crown ascent. American medical device saleswoman Katelyn Sims made the ascent two days later.
- 2026:
  - on 25 May, Chinese climber Gexi Luori made the first ever quadruple ascent, visiting Everest and Lhotse twice each in the same season.
  - on 28 May, Nirmal Purja set the record for fastest Double Crown ascent without supplemental oxygen, at 13 hours and 42 minutes.

== Scenic flights ==
Commercial scenic flights include Mount Lhotse in their itineraries.

== See also ==
- Lhotse Shar Glacier
- List of deaths on Lhotse
