= Ernst Reiss =

Swiss mountaineer (1920–2010)

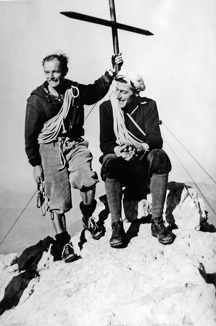
- Ernst Reiss (right) and Dölf Reist, at the summit of Fleischbank mountain in the Summer of 1951

Personal information
- Born: February 24, 1920 Davos, Switzerland
- Died: September 3, 2010 (aged 90) Basel, Switzerland

Ernst Reiss (24 February 1920 – 3 August 2010) was a Swiss mountaineer who made the first ascent of Lhotse, the world's 4th-highest mountain, in 1956.

On 18 May 1956, Reiss and Fritz Luchsinger successfully climbed the Lhotse, the 4th highest mountain on earth at 8,516-metre (27,940 ft). Lhotse is connected to Mount Everest via the South Col on the border of Tibet and Nepal, which Reiss and Jürg Marmet made the second ever ascent five days later (after the 1953 British Expedition).

Reiss was a member of the 1956 Swiss Everest–Lhotse expedition. At the end of April and start of May, the expedition erected some high camps. From the last high camp at the "Geneva Spur" on 18 May, Luchsinger and Reiss climbed the summit of Lhotse. Their colleagues Ernst Schmied and Jürg Marmet were successful on 23 May and one day later Dölf Reist and Hansruedi von Gunten made the second and third climb on Mount Everest.

Reiss died in Basel, Switzerland, on 3 August 2010, aged 90.

== Books ==
- Mein Weg als Bergsteiger. Frauenfeld: Huber 1959
