= Mingma Dorchi Sherpa =

Nepali Sherpa mountaineer

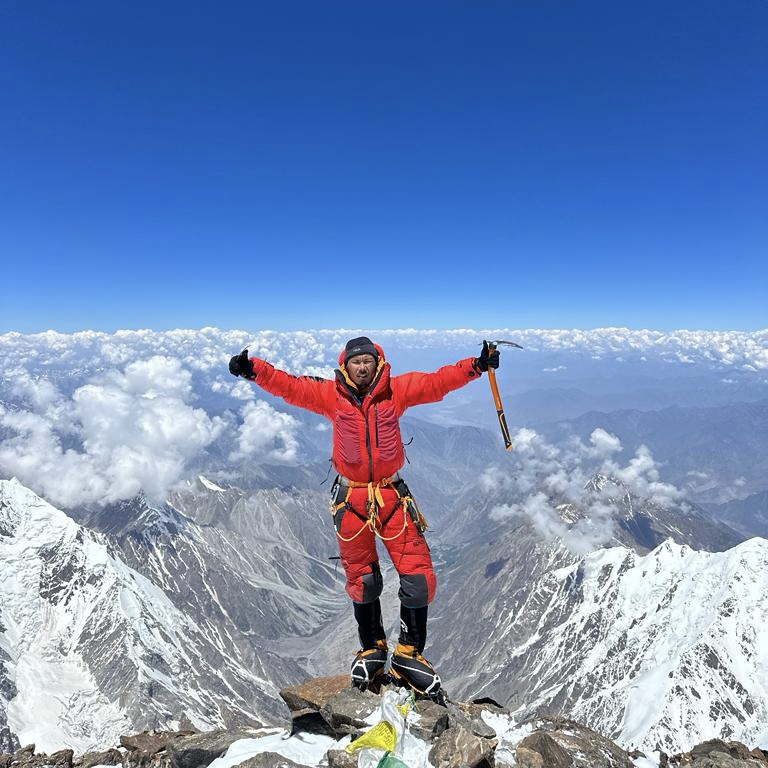
- Mingma on the summit of Nanga Parbat

Personal information
- Nationality: Nepali
- Born: 18 August 1987 (age 39) Sankhuwasabha District, Nepal
- Spouse: Kipa Sherpa
- Children: 2

Climbing career
- Major ascents: Everest summit: 7 K2 summit: 5 Manasulu summit: 5 Lhotse summit: 4 Makalu summit: 5 Dhaulagiri summit: 2 Kangchenjunga summit: 1 Annapurna I summit: 2 Broad Peak summit: 1 Gesharbum: 1 Nanga Parbat: 1

Mingma Dorchi Sherpa (born 1987) is a Nepali Sherpa mountaineer and trekking guide from Sankhuwasabha District, Nepal. He holds the Guinness World Record for being the fastest person to reach the summits of both Mount Everest and Lhotse in a record time of 6 hours and 1 minute. He has also completed the Seven Summits and four of the Volcanic Seven Summits.

== Life ==
Mingma was born in 1987, in Makalu 2, Tashigaun which belongs to Sankhuwasabha District of eastern Nepal. He lived with two sisters and one brother. Mingma lost his mother when he was 6 years old and his dad too when he was 14 years old. In 2001, despite wanting to continue his studies, he had to drop out of school to join a mountaineering team as a porter to earn money for his family.

He got his first opportunity to work as a porter in the Sherpani Col area, which is the highest pass in the Great Himalaya Trail of Nepal. However, he discontinued his portering job and started a small tea shop business at the base camp of Makalu from 2004 to 2008.

In 2010, he rejoined the mountaineering field as a climbing guide and made his debut summit at Ama Dablam. He made his first Everest summit in the spring of 2011.

Mingma also holds the second-best timing of summiting Everest, Lhotse, and Makalu within 54 hrs and 25 mins.

He is married to Kipa Sherpa and has two sons named Passang Sherpa and Phurba Sherpa.

He is also one of the directors of Pioneers Adventure Pvt Ltd., which deals with adventure activities in the Himalayas.

== Guinness World Record ==
On 27 May 2019, Mingma made a Guinness World Record for summitting both Everest and Lhotse within a record time of 6 hours and 1 minute. He broke the previous record of fellow Nepalese mountaineer Nirmal Purja, who had a time of 10 hours 15 minutes.

== Mountains summited by Mingma Dorchi Sherpa ==
| S.no | Name of mountain | Year |
|---|---|---|
| 1 | Everest (8848.86 m) | 2024, 2023, 2019, 2018, 2016, 2013, 2011 |
| 2 | K2 (8611 m) | 2023, 2022, 2021, 2014, 2012 |
| 3 | Kangchenjunga (8586 m) | 2022 |
| 4 | Lhotse (8516 m) | 2021, 2019, 2018, 2012 |
| 5 | Makalu (8484 m) | 2022, 2019, 2017, 2012 |
| 6 | Dhaulagiri (8167 m) | 2017, 2014 |
| 7 | Manaslu (8163 m) | 2024, 2021, 2019, 2018, 2011 |
| 8 | Nanga Parbat (8126 m) | 2023 |
| 9 | Annapurna I (8091 m) | 2024, 2021 |
| 10 | Broad Peak (8051 m) | 2019 |
| 11 | Gasherbrum II (8035 m) | 2019 |
| 12 | Aconcagua (6960 m) | 2025 |
