= Krzysztof Wielicki =

Polish mountaineer (born 1950)

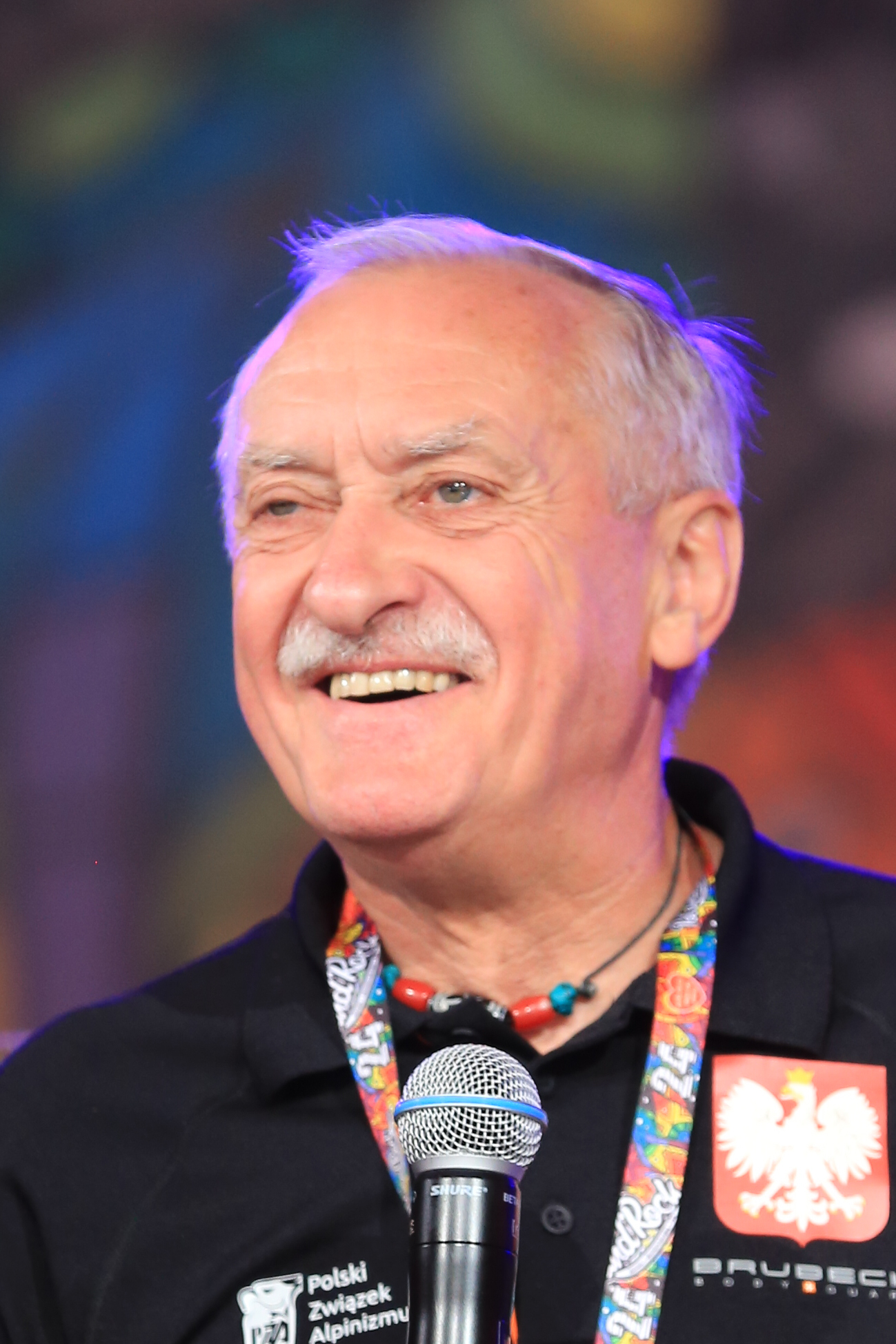
- Wielicki at the Pol'and'Rock Festival 2018

Personal information
- Nationality: Polish
- Born: 5 January 1950 (age 76) Szklarka Przygodzicka, Poland

Climbing career
- Known for: First to climb Mount Everest, Kangchenjunga, and Lhotse in winter

Krzysztof Jerzy Wielicki (Polish pronunciation: [ˈkʂɨʂtɔf vjɛˈlit͡skʲi]; born 5 January 1950) is a Polish mountaineer, regarded as one of the greatest Polish climbers in history. He is the 5th man to climb all fourteen eight-thousanders and the first ever to climb Mount Everest, Kangchenjunga, and Lhotse in winter. He is a member of The Explorers Club.

== Life ==
He was born on 5 January 1950 in Szklarka Przygodzicka, Greater Poland. He graduated from the Wrocław University of Science and Technology (WUST) where he studied electronics. He chaired the Tourism Committee in the Polish Students' Association at the Faculty of Electronics at the WUST. He started climbing in Sokoliki in May 1970. In 1972, he participated in his first climbing course and a winter camp led by Wanda Rutkiewicz.

In 1973, he achieved first major international climbing successes during a camp in the Dolomites. Together with Bogdan Nowaczyk, he became the first climber to complete within one day the Via Italiano-Francese on Punta Civetta. He later travelled to climb in the Caucasus Mountains, Hindu Kush and Pamir Mountains.

On 17 February 1980, as a member of Polish national expedition led by Andrzej Zawada, Wielicki and Leszek Cichy reached the summit of Everest and, in doing so, they became the first to climb an eight-thousander in the winter. He was also the first to make successful winter ascents of Mount Everest, Kangchenjunga, and Lhotse, three out of four highest mountains in the world.

He climbed Broad Peak during a solo expedition and made the first ever ascent of an eight-thousander from a base within 24 hours. He climbed Dhaulagiri and Shishapangma alone establishing new routes. He also made a solo ascent of Gasherbrum II and Nanga Parbat, a feat that was only witnessed by a few Pakistani shepherds. He participated in a number of expeditions on K2. In 1996, he made an ascent of the mountain along the north pillar together with two Italian climbers.

He organized the 2002-2003 Polish winter expedition on K2, which failed to reach the summit. He made another attempt to climb an eight-thousander in the winter by organizing an expedition on Nanga Parbat (2006-2007) but was forced to turn back due to adverse weather conditions. In 2013, he led an expedition to climb Broad Peak in the winter. On 5 March, Adam Bielecki, Artur Małek, Maciej Berbeka and Tomasz Kowalski reached the summit for the first time in history during winter (Berbeka and Kowalski died while descending from the mountain). In 2018, he led another unsuccessful expedition to reach the summit of K2 in the winter.

In January 2022, he released his autobiography entitled Solo. Moje samotne wspinaczki (Solo. My Solitary Climbs) which "delves into the climber’s circumstances, emotions and motivations that led him to undertake each of his solitary ascents".

== Recognition ==
In 2001, he received the Lowell Thomas Award conferred by The Explorers Club. He was awarded the Commander's Cross of the Order of Polonia Restituta in 2003, for his outstanding achievements in alpinism and for popularizing the sport of climbing. In 2015, he was awarded Wrocław University of Science and Technology Medal for his achievements in alpinism.

In 2017, the International Astronomical Union approved the name of asteroid discovered by Vincenzo Silvano Casulli as 173094 Wielicki in honour of the Polish climber.

In 2018, he received jointly with Reinhold Messner the Princess of Asturias Award in the category of Sports. The 2019 Piolet d'Or was awarded in September 2019 to Wielicki as the 11th Lifetime Achievement award.

== Major ascents ==
Year	Mountain	Height (in metres)	Remarks
1980	Mount Everest	8848	First winter ascent of an 8000-meter peak (with Leszek Cichy)
1984	Broad Peak	8051	First one-day ascent of an 8000-meter peak (solo)
1984, 1992	Manaslu	8163	New route on the South-South-East Face
1986	Kangchenjunga	8586	First winter ascent of Kangchenjunga (with Jerzy Kukuczka)
1986	Makalu	8485	Alpine style
1988	Lhotse	8516	First winter ascent of Lhotse (solo)
1990	Dhaulagiri	8167	New route, solo expedition
1991	Annapurna Massif	8091	Bonington route
1993	Cho Oyu	8201	Polish route
1993	Shishapangma	8027	New route on the South Face, solo expedition, in 24 hours
1995, 2006	Gasherbrum II	8035	Solo expedition
1995	Gasherbrum I	8080	Alpine style
1996	K2	8611	Japanese route
1996	Nanga Parbat	8126	Kinshofer route, solo expedition

== See also ==
- Jerzy Kukuczka
- Wanda Rutkiewicz
- List of eight-thousanders

Awards
Preceded by New Zealand national rugby union team	Princess of Asturias Award for Sports (with Reinhold Messner); 2018	Succeeded by Lindsey Vonn
