= Szklarka Przygodzicka =

- Village
- Location within Poland
- Coordinates: 51°29′N 17°47′E
- Country: Poland
- Voivodeship: Greater Poland
- County: Ostrzeszów
- Gmina: Ostrzeszów
- Time zone: UTC+1 (CET)
  - Summer (DST): UTC+2 (CEST)

Szklarka Przygodzicka [ˈʂklarka pʂɨɡɔˈd͡ʑit͡ska] is a village in the administrative district of Gmina Ostrzeszów, within Ostrzeszów County, Greater Poland Voivodeship, in south-central Poland.

It is the birthplace of Polish high altitude climber Krzysztof Wielicki.
