= 2013 Nanga Parbat massacre =

Terrorist attack in Pakistan

Coordinates: 35°27′18″N 73°56′59″E

- Part of the War in North-West Pakistan
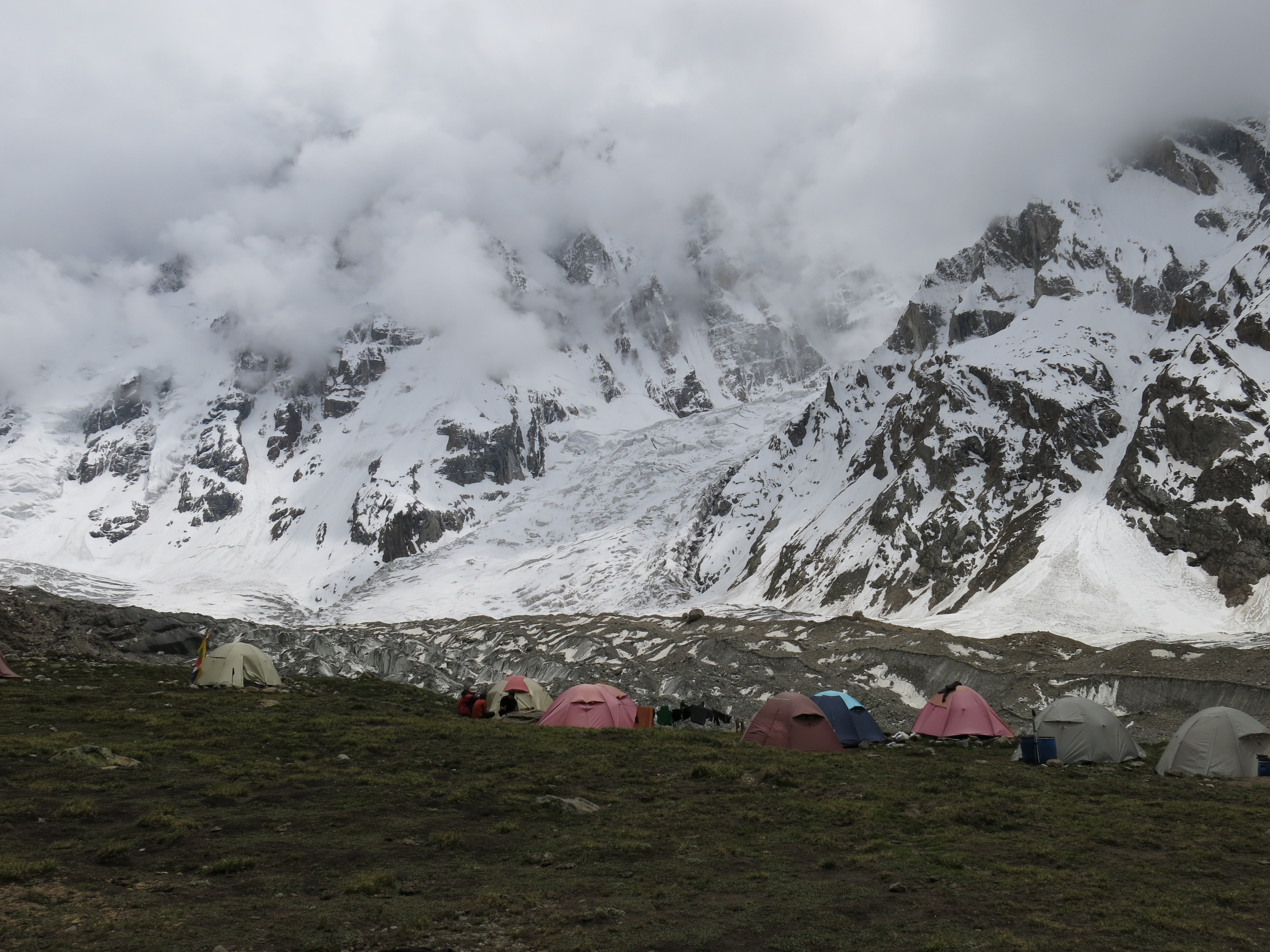
- The base camp where the attack took place, with Nanga Parbat visible in the background

- Location of Nanga Parbat within Gilgit–Baltistan Location of Nanga Parbat within Pakistan
- Location: Nanga Parbat, Gilgit–Baltistan, Pakistan
- Date: 22 June 2013 – 23 June 2013; 10:00 p.m.–12:00 a.m. (Pakistan Standard Time, UTC+05:00)
- Target: Foreign mountaineering party
- Attack type: Mass shooting
- Deaths: 11
- Injuries: 2
- Perpetrator: Tehrik-i-Taliban Pakistan
- Motive: Retaliation for American drone strikes in North-West Pakistan

The 2013 Nanga Parbat massacre was a terrorist attack that took place on the night of 22 June 2013 in Gilgit–Baltistan, Pakistan. About 16 terrorists, reportedly dressed in Gilgit−Baltistan Scouts uniforms, stormed a high-altitude mountaineering base camp and killed 11 people; 10 climbers and one local tourist guide. The climbers were from various countries, including Ukraine, China, Slovakia, Lithuania and Nepal. A Chinese citizen managed to escape the assailants, and a member of the group from Latvia happened to be outside the camp during the attack. The attack took place at a base camp on Nanga Parbat, the ninth-highest mountain on Earth. The mountain is popular among trekkers and mountaineers, and is typically toured from June to August because of the ideal weather conditions during these months.

In November 2013, many of the assailants involved in the attack were arrested and tried under the Anti-Terrorist Act, although most of those who were arrested had been released by 2014; the identities of the actual perpetrators were never confirmed. According to the Pakistani Senate's standing committee on foreign relations, the original motive of the terrorists had not been to kill the tourists, but to kidnap them for ransom.

== Attack ==
At 10:00 p.m. local time on 22 June 2013, about 16 attackers entered the base camp below the Diamir face, where most mountaineers who come to climb Nanga Parbat stay. The attackers then opened fire, killing 11 people, including ten mountaineers and one local guide. Three came from Ukraine, two each from Slovakia and China, one each from Lithuania, Nepal and Pakistan, and another was an American with dual Chinese citizenship.

The attackers had reportedly gained access to this remote location by abducting two Pakistani guides. The site of the attack is located 4,200 metres (14,000 ft) above sea-level and can only be approached via foot or horseback. According to a Diamer police official, Muhammad Nabi, one of the abducted guides was killed during the shootout, while the other was found and detained for questioning. He said that there was general misinformation in the media regarding the Pakistani killed. Nabi stated that the guide of the expedition was a Nepalese by the name of Sona Sherpa and not the Pakistani guide as portrayed by the local media.

Zhang Jingchuan, a Chinese mountaineer who survived the assault, described his ordeal in a press-conference held at Kunming in the Yunnan province of China. He recalled the attack being sudden. He said that he was shot at and a bullet flew over his head. After that, he stated he got out and started running blindly towards a trench 30 metres (100 ft) away. Upon reaching the trench he jumped in and stayed there for 40 minutes. After that he made his way back to the cabin, where he called the police from a satellite phone. According to Zhang, a helicopter arrived nine hours after the incident, at first light, during which time he had grabbed an ice-axe and had moved to higher ground. Zhang Jingchuan also noted that before shooting the climbers, the attackers collected the climbers' passports and took their photos.

Sher Khan, a Pakistani climber who survived the attack, revealed more details. According to his report, the terrorists first made the climbers give them money, satellite phones and radio sets, then tied the climbers' hands with ropes. After that, they asked the climbers to turn their faces in the opposite direction and shot them immediately.

The perpetrators identified themselves as "al-Qaida" and "Taliban". Some were teenagers, while others were in their twenties and the leader was older. "They were shouting God is Great, long live Islam and long live Osama bin Laden," Sher Khan remembered. "They kept shouting as they left. I remember one shouting: 'this is revenge for Sheikh bin Laden.'"

This shooting was the first time an attack on mountaineers occurred in the Gilgit-Baltistan region of Pakistan, which was generally considered free from militancy apart from sporadic attacks on the minority Shi'ite Muslims.

According to later information, the terrorists planned to kidnap Chen Honglu (the dual Chinese-American citizen) to trade him for a Taliban commander in Afghanistan. As the attack unfolded in the Nanga Parbat base camp, Chen burst out of his tent and tackled one of the terrorists using martial arts techniques. The terrorist, named Mujeeb, panicked and shot him, destroying the main purpose of the mission and infuriating the terrorist commanders. The remaining climbers were then tied up and shot. The attackers then walked for five hours to a remote village where they buried their uniforms and had breakfast before walking on to another village and dispersing.

== Perpetrators ==
The Tehrik-i-Taliban Pakistan (TTP) claimed responsibility for the attack in a statement released later that day. The group claimed it was a retaliation for the U.S. drone strike that killed Wali-ur-Rehman, a Taliban commander, on 29 May 2013. The TTP's spokesperson, Ehsanullah Ehsan, said "Through this killing we gave a message to (the) international community to ask (the) U.S. to stop drone strikes". Another TTP-associated terrorist group, Jundallah, which is notorious for organizing attacks on Shia Muslims and for its involvement in the Balochistan insurgency against Iran and Pakistan, had also previously claimed responsibility.

== Victims ==
List of fatalities in the massacre:

Victims	Country	Names	Notes
3	Ukraine	Ihor Sverhun, 47; Badavi Kashayev, 54; Dmytro Koniayev, 43	Sverhun was the team leader and had climbed six eight-thousanders in the past. All three of the deceased Ukrainian mountaineers were from Kharkiv.
2	Slovakia	Anton Dobeš, 50; Peter Šperka, 57	Slovak mountaineers, ski-alpinists; Dobeš was a local politician and Šperka was a rescue worker in the High Tatras mountain range.
2	China	Yang Chunfeng, 45; Jianfeng Rao, 49	Yang was a leading Chinese mountaineer who had climbed eleven eight-thousanders. Rao was another leading Chinese mountaineer who had climbed ten eight-thousanders.
1	China / United States	Honglu Chen, 50	American national with dual Chinese citizenship.
1	Lithuania	Ernestas Markšaitis, 44	Solo-climbed Broad Peak, the twelfth-highest mountain in the world (located in Pakistan) in 2012, attempted K2 (also located in Pakistan) that same year, attempted Dhaulagiri (in Nepal) and other eight-thousanders in the past.
1	Nepal	Sona Sherpa, 35	Nepalese mountaineer who climbed K2 (located in Pakistan) in 2012
1	Pakistan	Ali Hussain, 28	Pakistani cook in one of the teams (not a guide as previously thought).

== Investigation and arrests ==
Following the incident, the Interior Minister of Pakistan, Nisar Ali Khan, suspended the Inspector General of Police (IGP) and the Chief Secretary of Gilgit-Baltistan for their failure to provide effective security to the tourists. He further stated that an inquiry would be held to determine the cause of the incident.

A day following the attack, Nisar told the National Assembly of Pakistan that an investigation committee consisting of the Chief of Army Staff (Ashfaq Parvez Kayani), the Director General of the ISI (Zaheerul Islam), representatives from other intelligence agencies and officials from the Gilgit-Baltistan police had been formed to investigate the incident. A local jirga was also formed in Diamer.

Immediately after the investigation started, 37 suspects were arrested from the villages surrounding the site of the attack. However, IGP Zakaria later said that 33 of them were porters who gave important information regarding the attack. All 37 were released after questioning.

A significant breakthrough was made four days after the incident when all 16 of the attackers were identified. According to the police chief, Zakaria, the help from the local Diamer jirga was instrumental in this development. The men volunteering in the jirga were dropped off into various adjacent valleys and then picked up for a debriefing in Chilas. The police chief further stated that all the attackers were local, with 10 of them belonging to Diamer, three to Mansehra and three of them belonging to Kohistan. The ten Diamer valley residents were identified as Hidayat Ullah, Shafiqullah, Qari Rafaqat, Sana Ullah, Malik Nijad, Azizullah, Mahfoozul Haq, Mujeed, Shafi Muhammad and Hazrat Oman. The Chief Secretary of Gilgit-Baltistan, Munir Badini, was hesitant in linking them to the Pakistani Taliban but confirmed that from the reports he received, the assailants were trained in FATA, a place 760 kilometres (470 mi) downhill that is a hotbed of extremism and borders Afghanistan.

On June 30, 2013, a week after the assault, the Deputy Inspector General of Police for Gilgit-Baltistan police, Ali Sher, told the media that one of the attackers, Shafi Muhammad, was arrested in a house in the nearby town of Chilas. He said the attacker had been taking refuge in this house since the attack and arresting him was major milestone in resolving this case. Another attacker, Shafiqullah, was arrested later the same day.

On July 6, 2013, the police arrested another person from Chilas believed to be involved in the shooting. Sher, in a press conference, stated that efforts to arrest all perpetrators had stepped up and more arrests would take place in the coming days.

On July 15, 2013, four out of the 16 suspected attackers had been arrested. The identity of the fourth perpetrator was undisclosed. The Senate Standing Committee on Foreign Relations called a special meeting to get an update from the Gilgit-Baltistan authorities on the progress of investigation. The chairman of the Senate Committee, Haji Mohammad Adeel, said that he was concerned that there was no tangible progress in bringing the culprits to justice. The Chief Secretary of Gilgit-Baltistan, Mohammad Younus Dhaga, was briefing the Senate Standing Committee on Foreign Relations over the attack on Nanga Parbat saying that "it was unexpected that foreign tourists would be targeted in the area, since no tourist was killed there since 1854." Haji Mohammad Adeel disagreed, saying, "no attack is carried out by making the plan public; it is the intelligence agencies' task to assess areas, while being cognisant of the overall security atmosphere."

On August 7, 2013, Taliban killed three security officials who were investigating the Nanga Parbat massacre. Gunmen opened fire on the officers' vehicle in Chilas in the Diamer district while it was returning from the house of the deputy commissioner. The officials who were killed included a police official, Superintendent Hilal Ahmed, who was driving the vehicle, Captain Ashfaq Aziz and Colonel Ghulam Mustafa. The latter two belonged to the Pakistan Army and were responsible for the internal security of the district.

The death of army officials prompted the Pakistan Army to enter the district for the first time since the incident. The army conducted a targeted operation in four places in Chilas while the entry and exit points to the town were sealed and Army Aviation helicopters hovered above. The operations lasted till late in the evening of August 11, 2013. An undisclosed number of suspects were rounded up as a result.

On August 19, 2013, it was reported that all 20 of the men supposed to be behind the Nanga Parbat attack had been arrested. The series of arrests were started by an army operation earlier in the week and ended with a targeted police operation in the suspected hideouts of these terrorists. According to the newly instated SP of Diamer district, Muhammad Navid, the arrested terrorists were also responsible for the February 2012 Kohistan Shia Massacre, in which 18 Shi'ite Muslims were killed. Navid further said that intelligence agencies played a pivotal role in the arrests and that further information would be released in a couple of days.

The Chief Secretary of Gilgit-Baltistan, Younis Dagha, announced that among the arrested on August 19, 2013, was the terrorist Qaribullah ("Hasan"), a former Tehreek-e-Taliban Pakistan leader of the Chilas unit, who might be the mastermind of the Nanga Parbat attack, as well as M Nabi (Qari Husnain), who was a suspect in the murder of government officials on August 7, 2013.

As of June 2014, five out of 18 detained suspects were still in custody. However several terrorist sources say only one of them was involved in the attack, while the rest were forced to confess. Mujeeb remained in hiding in the forests of the district, where, from time to time, he was making audio recordings of terrorist poetry that were being brought into the markets of Gilgit. According to Bashir Qureshi, a member of the negotiating team assigned to bring the culprits out of hiding, there were many grey areas in the case. "Nothing is clear, they have mixed up four different cases to give an impression that all the perpetrators have been arrested but the real perpetrators are still at large", he said.

=== 2015 Gilgit District jail escape ===
On 27 February 2015, four inmates made an attempt to escape from the Gilgit District jail. Of the two who managed to flee, one was alleged to have been involved in the Nanga Parbat mountaineering attack. Security agencies started an operation to capture the escapees, but as of 4 March 2015 the escaped inmates had not been captured. A reward ₨2,000,000 was also announced by the Gilgit–Baltistan Home Secretary, Sibtain Ahmed, for people who helped the authorities in capturing Habib-ur-Rehman, the escaped inmate allegedly involved in the massacre at Nanga Parbat.

== Reactions ==
- Pakistan – Pakistan Army helicopters were sent to retrieve the bodies of the killed mountaineers, while Pakistani Prime Minister Nawaz Sharif and President Asif Ali Zardari issued statements condemning the attack. The Gilgit–Baltistan Assembly passed a unanimous resolution condemning the "barbaric attack". One day after the incident, thousands of people from Chilas took to the streets to express solidarity with the relatives of the deceased. Shops and businesses also remained closed. Two days after the incident, scores of people gathered to hold a candlelight vigil in remembrance of the victims about 300 kilometres (190 mi) away from the site of the attack. Members of the civil society and the Pakistani government were present at the gathering, and attendees held placards inscribed with messages that denounced terrorism and empathized with the bereaved families. The local mountaineering expedition organizer, the Alpine Club of Pakistan, also censured the "deplorable and heinous act of terrorism".
- United Nations – Secretary-General of the United Nations, Ban Ki-moon, issued a statement condemning the attack and said that he was "deeply concerned about the recent wave of violence in Pakistan" and that the "UN will grant the Pakistani government full support in the face of terrorism and extremism." He also urged the Government of Pakistan to bring the perpetrators of the attack to justice.
- Germany – Two German expedition organizers, Hauser Exkursionen and Amical Alpin cancelled their trips to Nanga Parbat in the wake of the attack.
- Ukraine – The Ukrainian Foreign Ministry categorically condemned the attacks, asking the Pakistani government to compensate the bereaved and bring the culprits to justice as soon as possible.
- China – The Government of the People's Republic of China adopted an aggressive stance after the incident and asked their Pakistani counterparts to "severely punish" the perpetrators and ensure the security of their citizens.
- Latvia – The Foreign Minister of Latvia, Edgars Rinkēvičs, stated in a tweet following the attack that "Our mountain climber was not at the camp during the attack. A lucky coincidence. However, it is also a reminder that no one is safe from terrorists."

=== Non-state reactions ===
- International Climbing and Mountaineering Federation (UIAA) – President Frits Vrijlandt condemned the attack.
- Families of the Ukrainian climbers who were killed in the terrorist attack at the Nanga Parbat base camp have demanded compensation of US$300,000 for each of the deceased. The Government of Pakistan had previously refused the requests of the Ukrainian Ministry of Foreign Affairs to provide monetary compensation to the families of the killed climbers; lawyers said they intended to appeal.
