= Lhotse Middle =

Subsidiary peak to Lhotse

- Lhotse Central I, Lhotse East
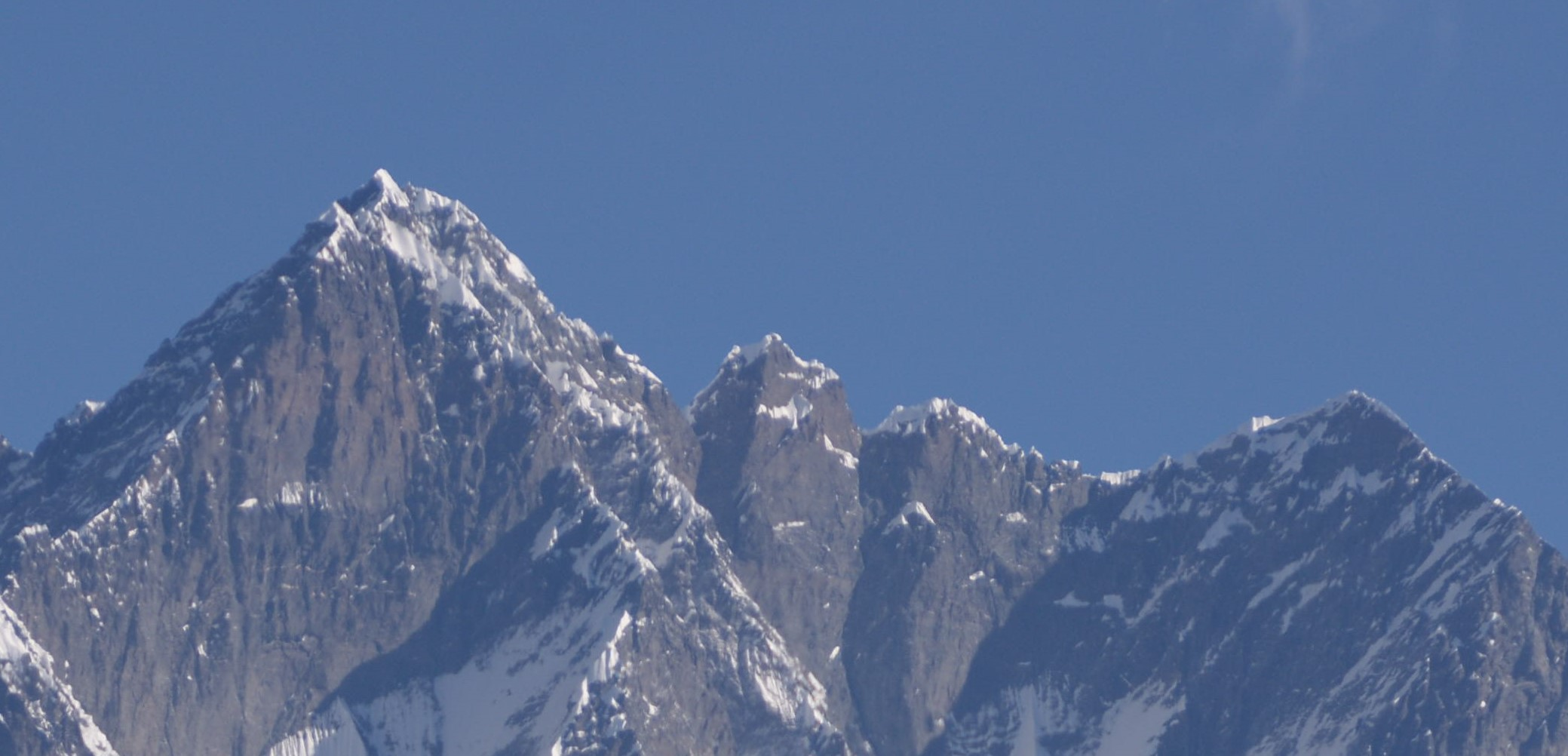
- Lhotse Middle (centre left) and Lhotse Central II (centre right) situated between Lhotse (at far left) and Lhotse Shar (at far right)

Highest point
- Elevation: 8,410 m (27,590 ft)
- Prominence: 60 m (200 ft)
- Parent peak: Lhotse
- Isolation: 0.31 km (0.19 mi)
- Coordinates: 27°57′39.21″N 86°56′20.08″E

Geography
- Location within Nepal
- Location: Lhotse, Khumbu, Nepal; Lhotse, Tibet Autonomous Region, China
- Parent range: Himalayas

Climbing
- First ascent: 23 May 2001
- Easiest route: Snow/rock climb

Lhotse Middle (also called Lhotse Central I and Lhotse East), is a subsidiary peak of 8,410 metres (27,590 ft) in elevation that sits in the middle of a ridge between its parent peak, the eight-thousander, Lhotse 8,516 metres (27,940 ft), and another subsidiary peak, Lhotse Shar 8,383 metres (27,503 ft). In 2013, a proposal by Nepal to the International Climbing and Mountaineering Federation (UIAA) to have Lhotse Middle (and Lhotse Shar) designated as standalone eight-thousanders was not successful due a perceived lack of topographic prominence. Right beside the peak is the smaller subsidiary peak of Lhotse Central II (8,372 metres (27,467 ft); sometimes the term West tower and East tower are used to distinguish Lhotse Central I and Lhotse Central II, respectively (which can create confusion given Lhotse Middle's alternative name as Lhotse East, i.e being east of the parent Lhotse summit).

== Climbing history ==
Lhotse Middle was first climbed in 2001 by three groups of Russian climbers. The first ascent was made on 23 May 2001 by Eugeny Vinogradsky, Sergei Timofeev, Alexei Bolotov, and Petr Kuznetsov; while on May 24, an ascent was made by Nikolai Zhilin, Gleb Sokolov, and Yuri Koshelenko. Vladimir Yanochkin, while Victor Volodin reached the summit on May 27. The Russian expedition was led by Nikolay Cherny and Victor Kozlov. Vasily Elagin and Yuri Ermachek were other expedition participants. At the time, Lhotse Middle was one of the last unclimbed named peaks above eight-thousand-meters (although as a subsidiary peak, it was not considered an eight-thousander). Several members of the 2001 expedition had attempted to reach the summit in 1997, but bad weather forced them to abandon the attempt, and one climber, Vladimir Bashkirov, died during the descent.
