= Yasushi Yamanoi =

Japanese mountaineer (born 1965)

Yasushi Yamanoi (山野井泰史) (born 1965) is a Japanese mountaineer who is known for making the first ascents of new climbing routes, often by solo climbing, on notable big wall routes, and on alpine climbing routes in the Greater Ranges. An editorial in the American Alpine Journal in 1999 commented on his "futuristic climbing" and he received the Piolet d'Or Lifetime Achievement Award in 2021.

== Big wall climbing ==
Yamanoi's 2021 Piolet d'Or Lifetime Achievement Award highlighted his ascent of Fitz Roy in 1990 when he made the first solo winter ascent of the peak. Other significant big wall ascents include:

- 1987: First solo ascent of the French Direct on the west face of the Aiguille du Dru, five years after Christophe Profit had established the route.
- 1988: Solo ascent, over eight days, of a new route on the 1,400m west face and north ridge of Mount Thor, Baffin Island.
- 2001: First ascent with Wojciech Kurtyka and Taeko Nagao of a 450m route climbing the south face of the Central Biacherahi Tower 5,700 m (18,700 ft). The route, Vertical Picnic (5.10 A2), took six days of climbing after bad weather had defeated an attempt on the north face of nearby Latok I.
- 2013: First ascent of the south-east face of Puscanturpa Este 5,400 m (17,700 ft), with Masaru Noda.

== Ascents in the Greater Ranges ==
His first venture to the Greater Ranges was in 1991 when, as part of a conventional Japanese expedition, he reached the summit of Broad Peak, 8,051 m (26,414 ft). After that he started to make more significant ascents in the Greater Ranges, highlights include:

- A new route, solo, in winter, on the west face and south-west ridge of Ama Dablam in 1992.
- The solo ascent in 1994 of a new route on Cho Oyu, 8,188 m (26,864 ft). The new route on the mountain's southwest face was a 2,200m line to the left of the route established in 1990 by Voytek Kurtyka, Erhard Loretan and Jean Troillet.
- First solo ascent of the east face of Kusum Kanguru, 6,367 m (20,889 ft) in 1998.
- He and Wojciech Kurtyka attempted a line of the unclimbed east face of K2, 8,611 m (28,251 ft) in 2000. They were driven back by bad weather but after Kurtyka had left Yamanoi made a notably fast solo ascent of the Cesen Route up the south-south-east spur and reached the summit in just 48 hours, the fastest ascent of the route at the time.
- He made the second ascent of the Slovenian Route on the north face of Gyachung Kang 7,952 m (26,089 ft) in 2002. He and his wife started to make the ascent together, in alpine-style, but she stopped at 7,600 m (24,900 ft) whilst Yamanoi climbed to the summit alone. Yamanoi rejoined his wife at 7,600m, they bivouaced before completing the descent but the following day were hit by an avalanche which injured and affected the vision of both climbers forcing them to make a second bivouac. For a full day of their descent Yamanoi had no vision and they both suffered frostbite which led to amputations when they returned to Japan, Yamanoi lost all toes from his right foot and a total of five fingers. Their experience was described in the book "Frozen", written by the Japanese author Kotaro Sawaki. It became a Japanese best seller, winning Japan's 2006 Kodansha Non-Fiction Award the year after its publication, and made Yamanoi’s name well-known in Japan to those outside the climbing community. During his four month hospital convalescence Yamanoi wrote his autobiography, "Vertical Memories" which was published in 2004.
- Whilst out running near his home in the Tokyo area he was badly mauled by a bear. That encounter, on the north side of Lake Okutama in 2008, left him hospitalised for several days recovering from multiple wounds to his right arm and his face. In the years afterwards he made first ascents in China, Greenland, and Peru but his next successful Himalayan climb was not until 2017 when he and Takaaki Furuhata made the first ascent of Rucho 5,970 m (19,590 ft) in the Hagshu area of the Kishtwar Himalaya. That ascent was cited as one of the "significant and innovative mountaineering ascents" during 2017.

== Personal life ==
He married the mountaineer Taeko Nagao in 1996 and they have climbed several major peaks together.

== Awards ==
In 2002, he received the Asahi Sports Award for "Global achievements in Alpine climbing".

In 2011, he was the recipient of the second Piolets d'Or Asia Career Award, and he was awarded the Piolet d'Or Lifetime Achievement Award in 2021.
