= Kazimierz Olech =

Polish mountaineer and alpinist

Kazimierz Waldemar Olech
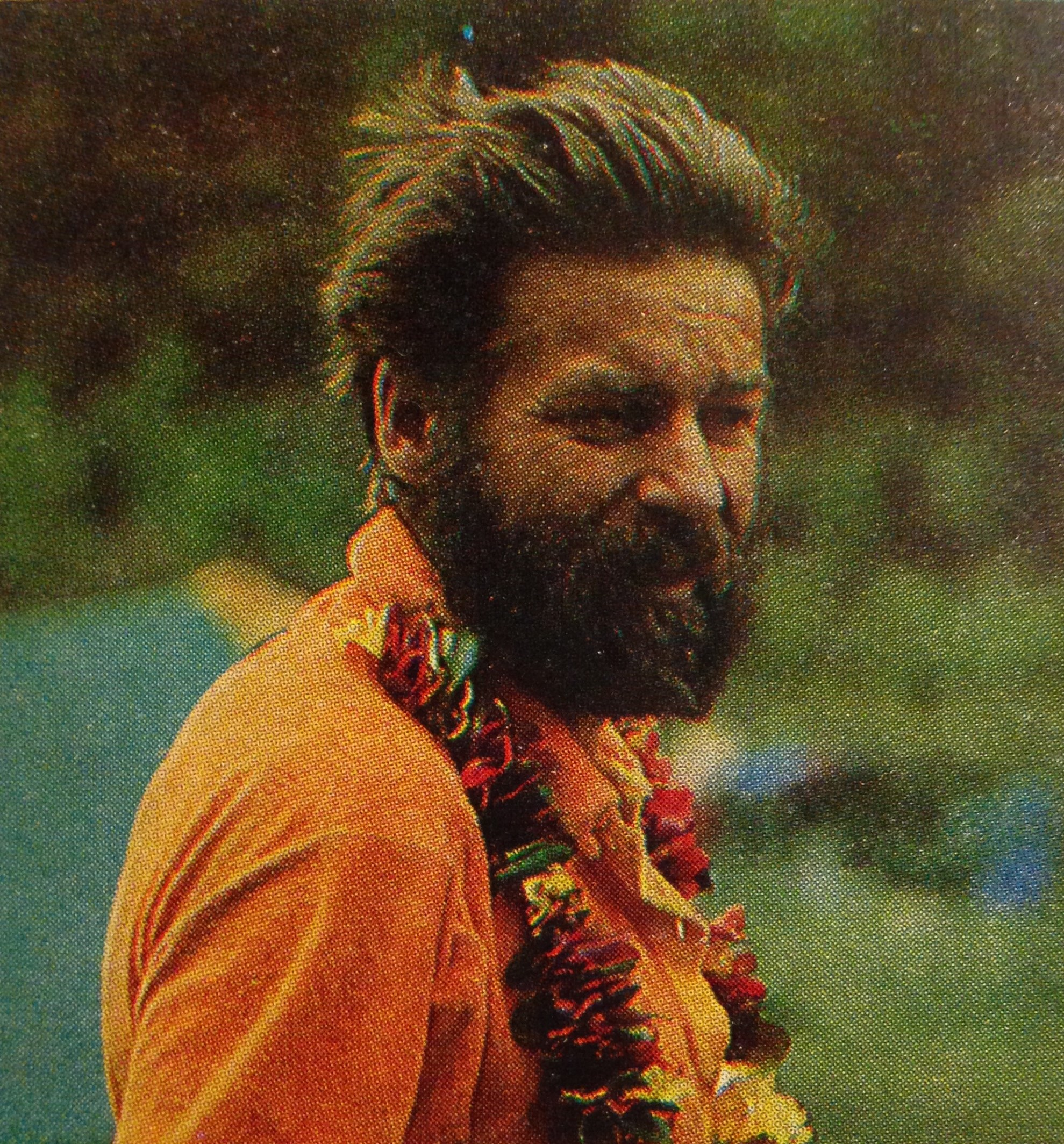
- Born: 6 August 1928; Kraśnik, Lublin Voivodeship, Poland
- Died: 12 January 2016 (aged 87); Warsaw, Poland
- Education: Warsaw University of Technology, Mechanical engineering
- Occupations: Mountaineer, mechanical engineer
- Known for: first ascent of central Kanchenjunga
- Children: 3

Kazimierz "Waldek" Waldemar Olech (6 August 1928 – 12 January 2016) was a Polish mountaineer, alpinist, Himalayan climber, caver, climbing instructor, and mountain photographer.

== Biography ==
Kazimierz Olech was born in Kraśnik, Poland in 1928. In his youth, he participated in Scouts and played volleyball for his school team. Kazimierz Olech first went to the High Tatras in 1947, and began mountaineering in 1954. He went on to climb hundreds of routes across the Tatras. In 1957, he set out to climb the entire ridge of the Tatras, from Huty at the western end to Ždiar in the east. It took three attempts and the loss of a climbing partner, Ryszard Wawra, before successfully making the first winter ascent of the Tatra ridge with Andrzej Zawada in 1959.

In 1957, he began climbing further afield, heading to summit difficult routes in the Alps, the Caucasus, the Hindu Kush, and the Pamir Mountains. He made a number of first ascents of unclimbed six- and seven-thousanders, including: Kohe Tez (7015 m) in 1962, Kohe Farzand (6185 m), Lunkho e Dosare (6901 m) and Kohe Urgent (7038 m) in 1968.

In addition to mountaineering, he was a spelunker. In 1966, he spent 14 days underground mapping passages of Szczelina Chochołowska, the largest cave in the Chochołowska Valley in the Western Tatras.

=== Himalayan expeditions ===
He would make five expeditions to the Himalayas. In 1974, he made the first ascent of Kangbachen (7902 m, earning the then Polish altitude record), the westernmost of Kangchenjunga's five points.

In 1978, he summited the then unclimbed central route of Kangchenjunga (8482 m, setting another Polish altitude record). The leader of the expedition to Kangchenjunga, Piotr Mlotecki was banned from climbing in Nepal for 5 years after the central summit, as the expedition did not receive official permission to climb these routes in advance.

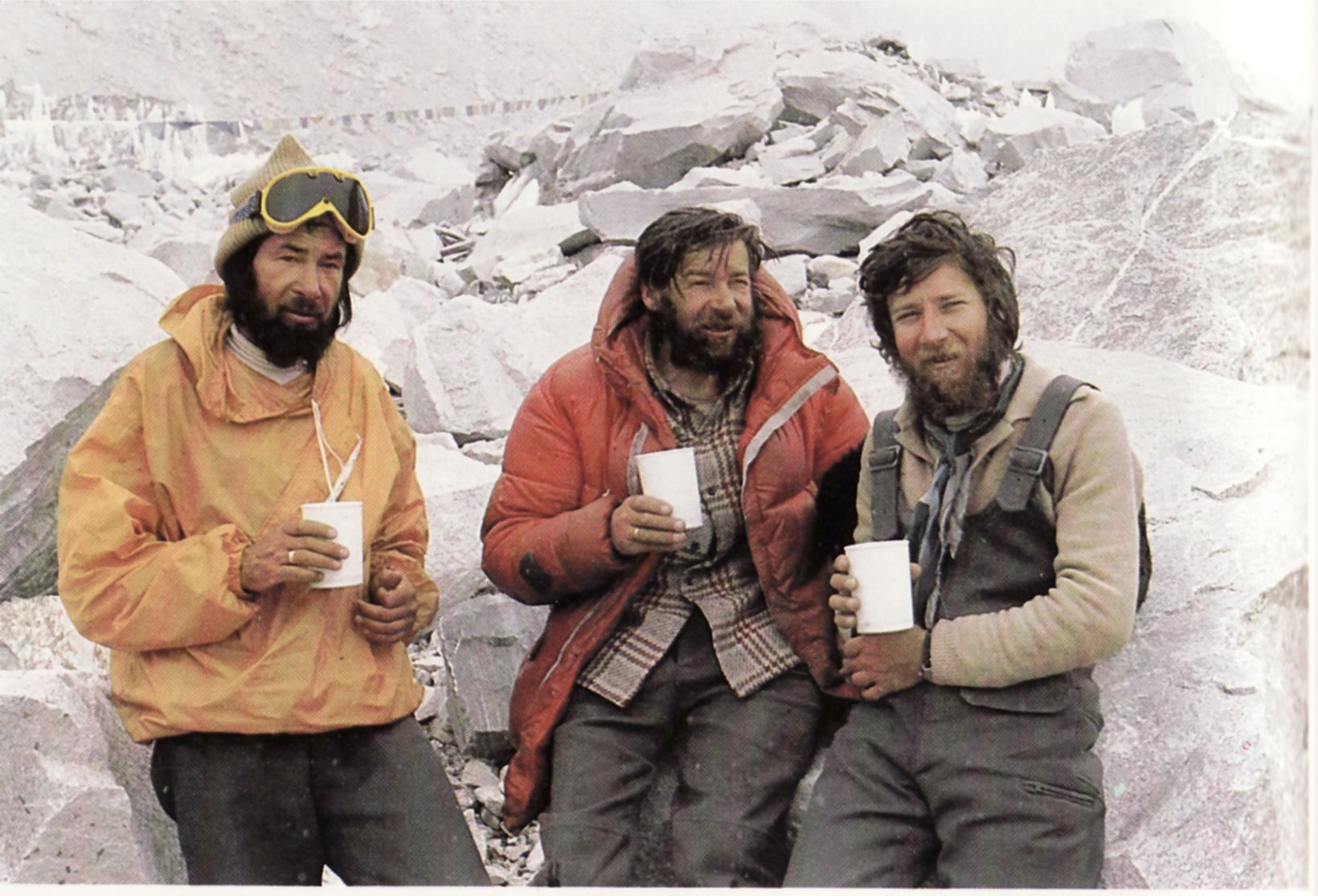
Andrzej Heinrich, Kazimierz Olech and Andrzej Czok at Mount Everest base camp (1980)

In 1979 and 1980, Olech participated in summer and winter expeditions to Mount Everest. After the summer expedition, Olech remained in base camp until the winter expedition arrived. He would spend 147 consecutive days on the Khumbu Glacier. While at base camp, Olech and Andrzej Heinrich fixed a new route up the southern pillar to the height of 8300m, and established the expedition's highest camp. The Polish expedition would be the first to summit Everest in winter successfully.

In 1984, Olech ended his high-altitude mountaineering career at 56 by climbing Satopanth (7075 m) and Kedarnath Dome (6831 m) in the Garhwal Himalayas.

In addition to climbing, he served as vice president of the High Mountaineering Club and the Polish Mountaineering Club.

After he retired from climbing, he was awarded the Bronze Cross of Merit and received the Polish Gold Medal "For Outstanding Sports Achievements" four times. He additionally received a gold medal for the 100th Anniversary of Polish Alpinism and was named an Honorary Member of the Polish Tatra Society.

He is the co-author of: Kangbachen zdobyty (1977), Dwie Kangchendzongi (1983), and Zimą na Wielkiego Grani (2000).

== Sporting achievements ==
- 1959 – 1970 – ascents of Ushba (4710 m), Scheldt (4320 m) and Nakra-tau (4277 m)
- 1962 – first ascent of Kohe Tez (7015 m)
- 1968 – first ascents of Kohe Farzand (6185 m) and Lunkho-e-Dosare (6901 m) and the first Polish ascent of Kohe Urgent (7038 m)
- 1970, 1972 – ascents of Lenin Peak (7134 m), Peak Ozodi (7105 m) and Ismoil Somoni Peak (formerly Peak Communism) (7495 m)
- 1974 – first ascent of Kangbachen (7902 m) – earning the Polish altitude record
- 1976 – ascents of the Noshaq (7492 m), Darban Zom (7110 m), Shingeik Zom (7291 m)
- 1978 – first ascent of the central Kangchenjunga (8482 m) – earning the Polish altitude record
- 1979 – participated in summer expedition to Mount Everest
- 1980 – participated in the winter expedition to Mount Everest
- 1984 – the ascent of Satopanth (7075 m) and Kedarnath Dome (6831 m)

== Bibliography ==
- Kurczab, Janusz (2008). Leksykon polskiego himalaizmu. Polskie Himalaje. Warszawa: Agora SA – Biblioteka Gazety Wyborczej. pp. 49–50. ISBN 978-83-7552-383-6.
- Radwańska-Paryska, Zofia; Paryski, Witold Henryk (2004). Wielka encyklopedia tatrzańska. Poronin: Wydawnictwo Górskie. ISBN 83-7104-009-1.
