= Yang Chunfeng =

Yang Chunfeng (1968 — 22 April 2013) was a Chinese mountaineer from Ürümqi, Xinjiang. He successfully summited eleven of the fourteen Eight-thousanders. Yang was killed in the 2013 Nanga Parbat massacre.

== Career ==
In 2002, as a liaison officer for a Polish team, he gained first experience on K2, the second highest mountain in the world.

On 16 May 2007, he became the first successful climber of Mount Everest, the highest mountain in the world, from Xinjiang.
