= Fritz Luchsinger =

Swiss mountaineer (1921–1983)

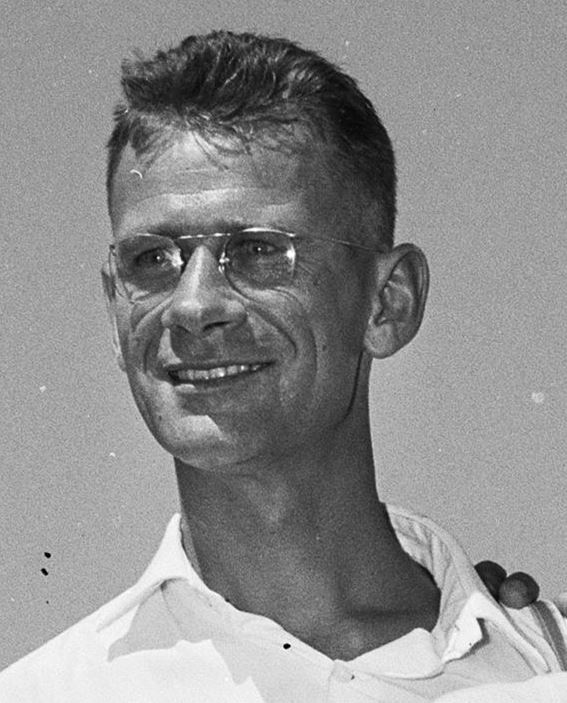
Fritz Luchsinger in 1956

Fritz Luchsinger (8 March 1921 – 28 April 1983) was a Swiss mountaineer. Together with Ernst Reiss, he made the first ascent of Lhotse (8,516 m), the 4th highest mountain in the world, on 18 May 1956. During the approach march Luchsinger came down with severe appendicitis, and had to recuperate in a room given to the Swiss expedition by the lama of Tengboche monastery.

Luchsinger disappeared during an attempt on Shishapangma in 1983.
