= Alex MacIntyre =

British mountaineer

Alex MacIntyre (5 March 1954 – 17 October 1982) was a British mountaineer in the 1970s. He is known for developing new climbing techniques that enabled ascents not previously accomplished.

== Early life ==
MacIntyre was born in Cottingham, East Riding of Yorkshire, to Scottish Catholic parents. His first experience of climbing came after his parents moved to Letchmore Heath while Alex studied for his A-levels at Watford Grammar School. Almost as soon as he entered the school, MacIntyre joined the London Mountaineering Club and frequently went on weekend climbing trips to north Wales. In 1972, he was awarded four grade As at A-level. He then attended Leeds University to study Geography and Economics, later switching to Law.

== Climbing ==
As a member of the Leeds University Mountaineering Club (LUMC), he developed his climbing skills, along with fellow students John Syrett, Brian Hall and John Powell. After climbing Yorkshire's gritstone, MacIntyre travelled to Scotland to develop his ice climbing technique and understanding of winter climbing conditions. On 14 March 1975, he made a solo ascent of two of the test pieces on Ben Nevis – Zero Gully and Point Five.

Alex was one of several British climbers who were proficient in 'front point" climbing, a style of climbing accomplished through the use of crampons with two front-slanting points or spikes which allow traction to be concentrated at the toe of a climber's boots. This allowed the British group to make a light and fast ascent, relatively unencumbered by gear and supplies, ascending and descending in a shorter time than traditional climbing methods allowed. During this period, MacIntyre and his climbing partners ascended the Grandes Jorasses giant ice sheet, The Shroud, in a single day, and also accomplished the first non-sieged ascent of the Harlin Direct on the Eiger North Face.

== Climbing in the Himalaya ==
MacIntyre later climbed in the Himalaya where he was a proponent of 'Alpine Style' ethics, along with a number of other climbers, including Voytek Kurtyka. He climbed with a number of international groups, whose ascents included attempts on major objectives such as Dhaulagiri, Changabang, Shishapangma and Makalu.

== Death ==
In the autumn of 1982, at the age of 28, MacIntyre was killed by a single stone while setting up a new route on Annapurna's South Face with French alpinist René Ghilini. In light of his contribution to British climbing, particularly advances in the 'light and fast' style of alpinism, the 'Alex MacIntyre Memorial Hut' was set up in the West Highlands where it is managed by the British Mountaineering Council and the Mountaineering Council of Scotland.

== Publications ==
A book written by MacIntyre and Doug Scott, entitled The Shishapangma Expedition, was published in 1984, and re-released in 2014.

In 2014, MacIntyre's climbing partner John Porter published a biography of his life. The book won the grand prize at the annual Banff Mountain Book Festival.
