= Igor Svergun =

Soviet and Ukrainian mountaineer (1966–2013)

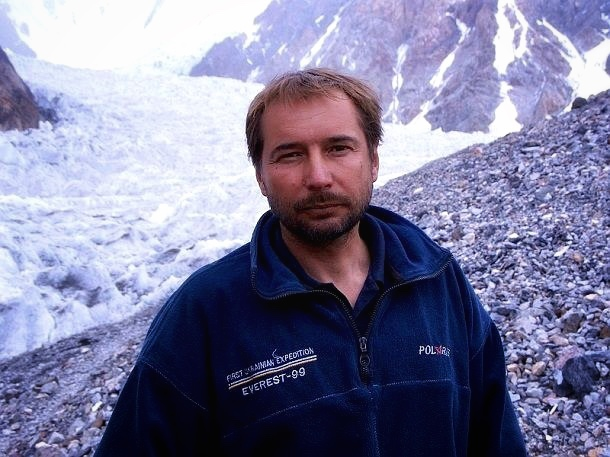

Personal information
- Native name: Свергун Ігор Миколайович
- Full name: Igor Mykolaiovych Svergun
- Citizenship: Ukraine
- Born: February 10, 1966 Kharkiv, Ukrainian SSR, Soviet Union
- Died: June 23, 2013 (aged 47) Nanga Parbat, Pakistan
- Resting place: Cemetery No.13, Kharkiv, Ukraine; GPS coordinates: 50.02182905900512, 36.27845988792096
- Occupations: Soviet and Ukrainian climber, mountain guide, rescuer
- Years active: 1984–2013
- Spouse: Tamara Svergun

Sport
- Country: USSR → Ukraine
- Sport: Mountaineer
- Rank: USSR Master of Sports in mountaineering (1989), USSR Snow Leopard award, USSR master of sports at the international level (1991), instructor-methodologist of the 3rd category.
- Club: Kharkiv Alpclub Ukraine, 7 Summits Club USA,
Medal record
Order "For Personal Courage"
Order "For Merit" 3rd Class
Order for Courage, 3rd class

Igor Mykolaiovych Svergun (Ukrainian: Ігор Миколайович Свергун, romanized: Ihor Mykolaiovych Sverhun; February 10, 1966 – June 23, 2013) was a Soviet and Ukrainian climber, who climbed many of the highest mountains in the world.

Svergun was murdered on 23 June 2013, when leading an international expedition to Nanga Parbat, Pakistan. Terrorists attacked the base camp, at an altitude of approximately 4200m, and shot ten mountaineers including him.

== Climbing ==
Svergun's passion for mountaineering began during his school years under mentor, Georgiy Kardash, a physical education teacher. He began by climbing Semenov-Bashi (3602 m) in the Greater Caucasus Range.

In 1990, he became a member of the Kharkiv Mountaineering Club and began training under the guidance of Sergey Bershov. Together they made many ascents, including the eight-thousanders Lhotse in 1990, Everest and Kangchenjunga. From Bershov's memoirs:

"What distinguished him? ... Like me once, he also engaged in mountaineering and rock climbing, which always gives an advantage on ascents. He stood out for his determination. And he also played the guitar ... And the guitarist is always the soul of the company."

"Igor set a goal for himself: to become a high-class, successful, in-demand mountain guide – and he did. He learned English, graduated from the master's program of the Kharkiv Academy of Physical Culture in the specialty "Olympic and professional sports". He could not live without mountains, without travel."

== Accomplishments ==
Svergun's best ascents include:

- 1990: The first ascent of the South Face of Lhotse (8,516m) to an altitude of 8,200m, as part of Bershov's team, in severe weather conditions. Numerous climbers had attempted this route unsuccessfully, including Reinhold Messner who retreated three times.
- 1991: Traverse of Manaslu with Viktor Pastukh and Alexey Makarov.
- 1992: Summited Everest's South Peak at 8,790m.
- 1994: Ascended Dhaulagiri.
- 1996: Ascended Annapurna via Bonington Route, alongside Bershov and Sergey Kovalev, as part of the Ukrainian State Sports Committee expedition led by Mstyslav Gorbenko.
- Shishapangma (alpine style).
- Other notable ascents include:
  - 1998: Ama Dablam
  - 1998: Pumori
  - 2004: Cho Oyu
  - 2005, 2006: Everest via the Northeast Ridge.

In 1999, during the "Ukraine – Everest-99" expedition, Svergun took part in a challenging rescue operation, transporting climber V. Horbach from an altitude of 8600m to the summit.

In 2008, as part of an expedition organized by the Kharkiv Regional Mountaineering Club, Svergun climbed Gasherbrum II (with Bershov and Alexey Bokov). Before the ascent, they erected a memorial plaque at the mountain's base to honor two Ukrainian climbers: Viktor Pastukh from Kharkiv and Gennadiy Vasilenko from Crimea, who died in 1996 during an attempt to climb Shishapangma.

Svergun twice summited Everest and reached many of the world's eight-thousanders. In 1990, he participated in the Soviet expedition led by A. Shevchenko, climbing Lhotse's Main Peak via the South Face. According to Igor:

"This ascent became my calling card. Whenever I meet fellow climbers, mentioning 'Lhotse' elicits genuine admiration. The climb was incredibly challenging. We weren't prepared for everything we encountered."

Among his other achievements are 25 routes of the 6th category of difficulty. Svergun said:

"For a mountaineer, the mountains are the only place on Earth where they feel comfortable and a sense of their own purpose on this planet..."

Svergun also worked with youth at the Kharkiv Alpсlub, served as a coach for various expeditions, and led commercial expeditions. In his later years, he held the position of senior coach at the Ukrainian Mountaineering Federation's Kharkiv branch.

== Death and aftermath ==
In June 2013, Svergun led an international expedition to Nanga Parbat, beginning on 6 June and scheduled to conclude on 17 July 2013. However, on the night of 23 June, terrorists attacked the base camp at an altitude of approximately 4200m. The attackers forced two local guides to take them to the base camp. The attackers rounded up the climbers and staff, took passports and money, destroyed mobile phones, blindfolded them, forced them to kneel and shot them. Ten mountaineers from different countries died, including Svergun and two other climbers from Kharkiv.

Responsibility for the killings was claimed by the Pakistani militant group Jundullah. Later, an affiliated movement called Tehrik-i-Taliban also claimed involvement.

Svergun's funeral took place on 30 June 2013, in Kharkiv, Ukraine, at Cemetery No.13 (Pushkins'ka St, 108, Kharkiv, Kharkivs'ka oblast, Ukraine). More than 5,000 people attended, including mountaineers from around the world.

== Legacy ==
- Memorial album, Igor Svergun: We don't conquer the mountains, just ascend into them. The publication features photographs from the archives of the Kharkiv Alpine Club and the family.
- The annual Ukraine Cup in mountaineering (discipline: mountaineering technique) in memory of Svergun invites boys, girls, adults, and veterans to participate. The prize fund of the Cup is formed from sponsorship contributions by Svergun's friends. Years of the competition: 2013, 2014, 2015, 2016, 2017, 2018, 2019, 2020, 2021. In 2022 it not held due to Russia's military invasion of Ukraine.
- An expedition to Mount Elbrus in August 2013, in memory of Kharkiv residents who died on June 23, 2013, in Pakistan, with the participation of Svergun's spouse Tamara and their son Yegor Svergun.
- Mention in the book "South Face of Lhotse" – S.I. Bershov, Snow, 2022.
- A memorial plaque in honor of I.N. Svergun was installed on September 29, 2014, on the building of Dmitry Kromsky Secondary School (Korocha, Proletarskaya Street, 39, Belgorod, Russia).

== Awards ==
- USSR Snow Leopard award
- Instructor-methodologist of the 3rd category.
- USSR Master of Sports in mountaineering (1989)
- The Order "For Courage", USSR (1990)
- USSR master of sports at the international level (1991)
- The Order "For merits" 3rd class, Ukraine(1996)
- The Order "For Courage" 3rd class. Ukraine (1999)
