= Leszek Cichy =

Polish mountaineer (born 1951)

Leszek Roman Cichy
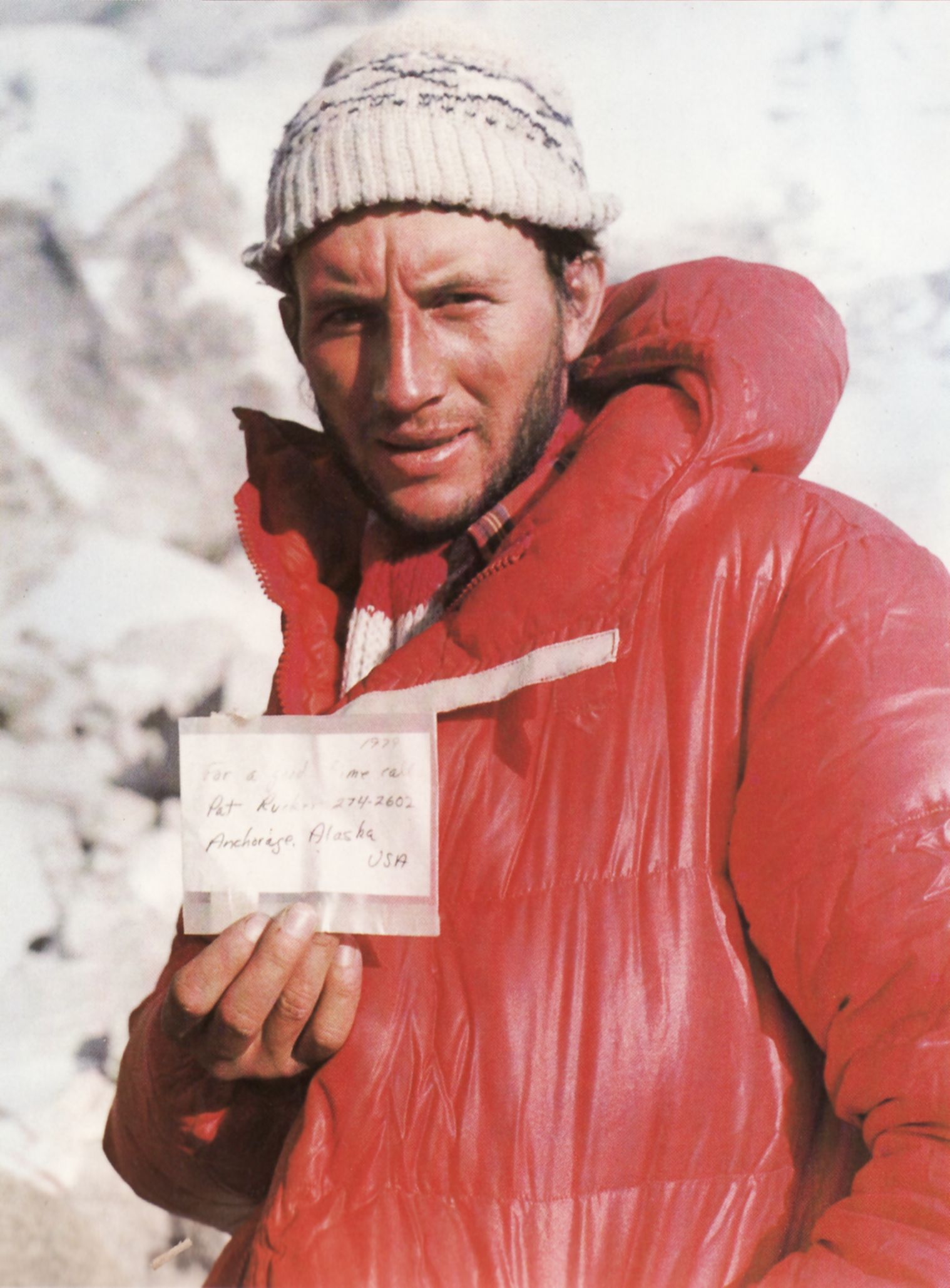
- Leszek Cichy in winter 1980, after first winter ascent of Mount Everest, presents note which Ray Genet left on top of Mount Everest in 1979.
- Born: November 14, 1951 (age 74); Pruszków, Poland
- Occupations: climber, financier, entrepreneur
- Known for: first winter ascent of Mount Everest, 1980; the first Polish climber to complete the Seven Summits

Leszek Roman Cichy (born 14 November 1951), (Polish pronunciation: [ˈlɛʂɛk ˈt͡ɕixɨ]) is a Polish climber, financier, and entrepreneur. He was born in Pruszków, Poland on 14 November 1951. He achieved the first winter ascent of Mount Everest together with Krzysztof Wielicki in 1980 which established the winter altitude record of 8,848 meters. He was also the first Polish climber to complete the Seven Summits and a number of other prestigious climbs.
