= Zygmunt Andrzej Heinrich =

Polish mountain climber (1937–1989)

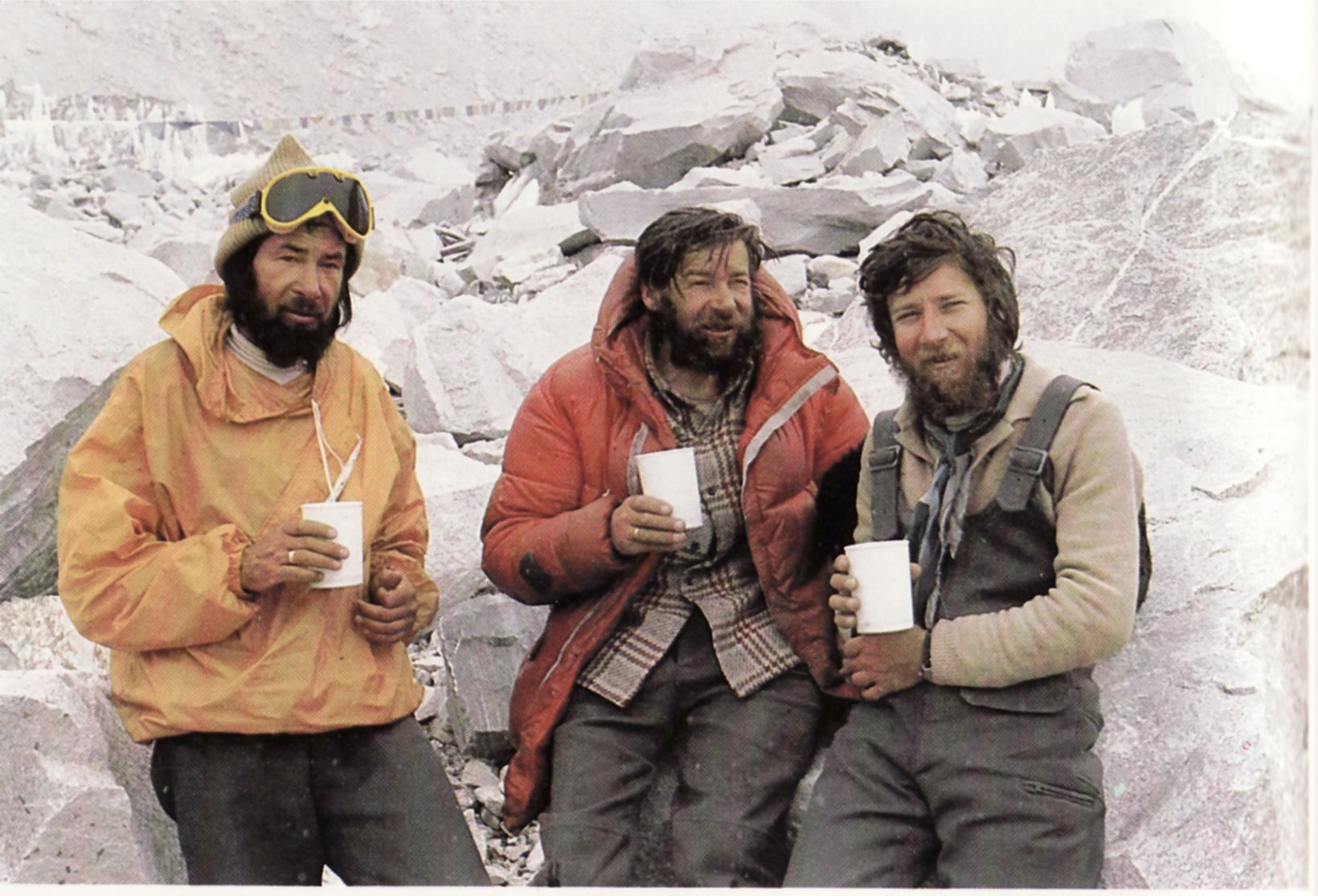
Andrzej Heinrich (left), Kazimierz Olech and Andrzej Czok attempting to climb Mount Everest in 1980

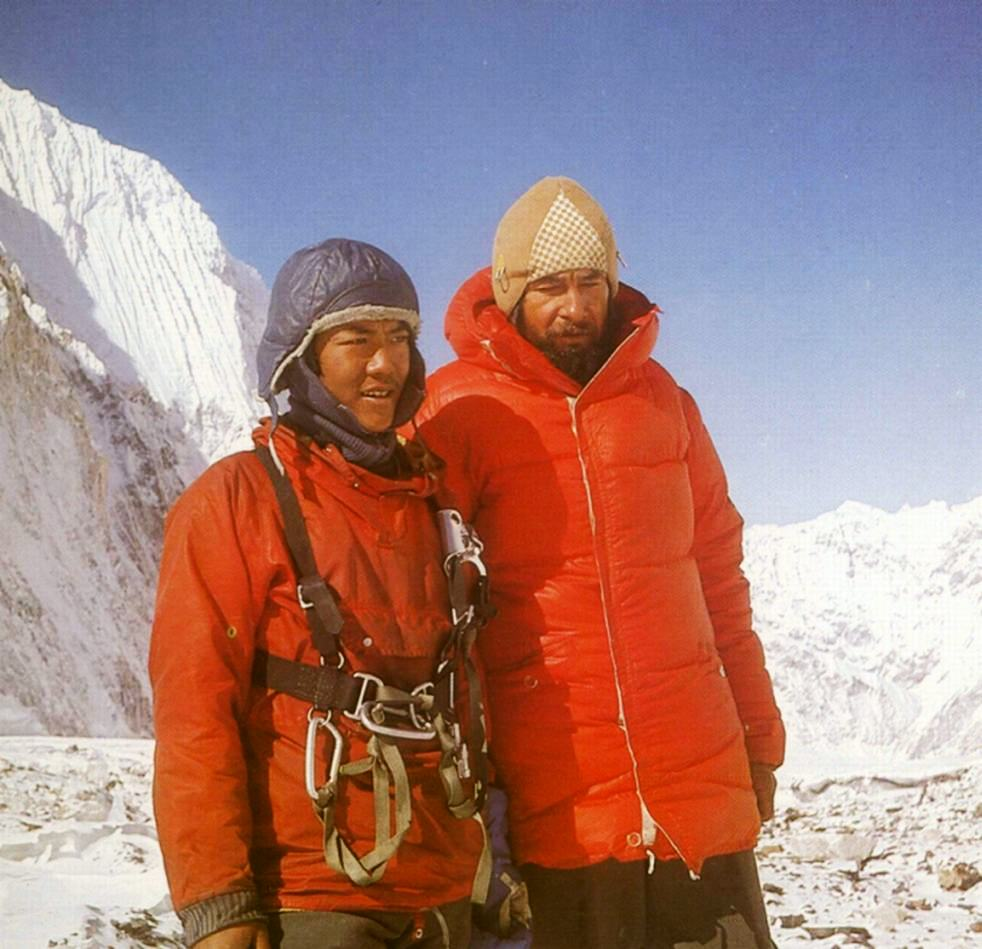
Andrzej Heinrich with Pasang Norbu Sherpa on Mount Everest

Zygmunt Andrzej Heinrich (21 July 1937 in Łbowo, central Poland – 27 May 1989 on Mount Everest) was a Polish mountaineer who made several ascents of eight-thousanders. He died in an avalanche on the northwest slopes of Mount Everest in 1989.

== Achievements ==
=== Tatra Mts and Alps ===
Zygmunt Andrzej Heinrich completed several technical climbs, including new routes and first winter ascents. He frequently climbed with Eugeniusz Chrobak; the pair is noted in Polish mountaineering history for their technical contributions to Himalayan climbing.

=== Great Ranges ===
- 1971 – Kunyang Chhish (7852 m) – first ascent to the summit (along with Andrzej Zawada, Jan Stryczyński and Ryszard Szafirski).
- 1974 – Lhotse (8250 m) in winter with Andrzej Zawada, reaching a height of 8,250 meters (27,070 feet), the first time anyone had gone above 8000 m in winter.
- 1978 – Kanchenjunga Central (8482 m), first ascent – together with Wojciech Brański, Kazimierz Olech.
- 1979 – Lhotse (8516 m), 4 October, ascent together with Andrzej Czok, Jerzy Kukuczka and Janusz Skorek.
- 1980 – Mount Everest, participated in the winter expedition, leading the way by the Ice Fall, and participated in setting up higher camps.
- 1981 – Masherbrum, SW Peak (7806 m), first ascent, with Marek Malatyński and Przemysław Nowacki. On the descent Malatyński and Nowacki both died during an enforced and exposed bivouac but Heinrich survived and managed to descend to base camp despite taking a fall of 650 to 1000 feet down ice-cliffs.
- 1985 – Cho Oyu (8201 m), winter expedition, new route via SE Pillar, ascent with Jerzy Kukuczka (15 February, three days after the first winter ascent by the team of the same expedition, Maciej Berbeka and Maciej Pawlikowski).
- 1985 – Nanga Parbat (8126 m), first ascent of the NE buttress, on the summit together with Jerzy Kukuczka, Carlos Carsolio and Sławomir Łobodziński.

== Sources ==
- Andrzej Zawada: Cho Oyu's Three-Kilometer-High Face. American Alpine Journal, 1986, pp. 6–13 (with 2 photographs with lines depicted, but these photos are not included with the online copy)
