= Sepp Mayerl =

Austrian mountaineer

Personal information
- Nationality: Austrian
- Born: 14 April 1937 Göriach, Tyrol, Austria
- Died: 28 July 2012 (aged 75) Lavant, Tyrol
- Occupation: Mountaineer

Climbing career
- Known for: Lhotse Shar first ascent; Mount Jitchu Drake first ascent

Sepp Mayerl, also known as Blasl-Sepp (14 April 1937 − 28 July 2012) was an Austrian mountaineer.

Mayerl was born on 14 April 1937 as the youngest of seven children into a farmer's family in the Tyrolean village of Göriach near Dölsach. He is renowned for making the first ascent of Lhotse Shar — a subsidiary summit of Lhotse — in May 1970 together with his friend Rolf Walter and for first climbing Mt. Jitchu Drake in May 1983 with Werner Sucher, Albert Egger, Alois Stuckler and Toni Ponholzer.

When he was 75, Mayerl fell to his death in the Lienzer Dolomites on 28 July 2012 while ascending the north ridge of the Adlerwand.
