= Nicolas Jaeger =

French physician and alpinist (1946–1980)

- Born: 20 October 1946; Boulogne-Billancourt, Paris, France
- Disappeared: 28 April 1980; Lhotse Shar, Nepal
- Occupations: physician, alpinist
- Family: Janine Niépce; Mother

Nicolas Jaeger (20 October 1946 – ca. 28 April 1980) was a French physician, alpinist, and ski mountaineer.

He made more than 100 solo ascents in the Mont Blanc massif, including more than a dozen first ascents. He also made several first ascents and solo ascents of peaks over 6000m in South America.

Jaeger became a mountain guide in 1975. He was last seen on 27 April 1980 on Lhotse Shar and is presumed dead.

== Early life and European Mountaineering ==
Jaeger was born on 20 October 1946 in Boulogne-Billancourt, France, the son of photographer Janine Niépce.

The numerous solo ascents (including several first ascents made whilst climbing solo) that he made of notable alpine routes in the early seventies led on to a solo crossing of the Grandes Jorasses and then the first solo traverse of the Chamonix Aiguilles in 1973. Then in August 1975 he made the first major modern enchainment in the Western Alps when, in 17 hours over two days, he made the first solo ascent of the Bonatti-Gobbi route on the Grand Pilier d'Angle, descended to the Upper Freney Glacier and then made the second solo ascent of the Central Pillar of Freney, thereby reaching the summit of Mont Blanc.; in the light of that accomplishment he has been referred to as "the inventor of modern enchainments".

== Mountaineering in Asia and South America ==
He was a member of a combined Franco-German expedition which was jointly led by Pierre Mazeaud & Karl Herligkoffer in 1978. On 15 October 1978 Pierre Mazeaud, Nicolas Jaeger and Jean Afanassieff became the first French nationals to reach the summit of Everest, having ascended by the "normal" South Col route. Kurt Diemberger filmed on the summit, and during the course of the ascent, for the documentary "Everest 78: Les Français sur le toit du monde". A heavy smoker, Jaeger lit and smoked an unfiltered Gitanes cigarette at the summit of Everest, which may be the highest altitude smoke break on record. Jaeger and Afanassieff then became the first to summit an eight-thousander mountain and then descend by skiing down the mountain, which they did from 8200m (below the south summit) to camp 1 at 6200m.

His name is closely linked to mountaineering in the Peruvian Andes, his climbs in the Cordillera Blanca "represent one of the most sustained and serious spells of solo climbing yet accomplished". Over two visits, in 1977 & 1978 he made a number of solo and first ascents. He returned in 1979, and from 27 July to 27 September 1979, he spent 60 days alone at 6,700 metres (22,000 ft) altitude on Huascarán to study the effects of "super-acclimatisation" on himself. He filmed the documentary Opération survie as a record of his time on Huascarán and published an account of his experience in "Carnets de Solitude" later that year.

On 27 April 1980, Jaeger was seen for the last time at 8,200 metres (26,900 ft) altitude during an attempted ascent of Lhotse Shar in Nepal (8383m), and is presumed dead.

In 1983, climber Roger Marshall claimed to have found Jaeger's body 500m below the summit in a yellow and blue tent.

== Notable first ascents and solos ==
- 1972 – Arête Sans Nom on the Aiguille Verte, first solo ascent.
- 1972 – North spur of Les Droites, first solo ascent.
- 1973 – North–south traverse of the Chamonix Aiguilles, first solo traverse.
- 1975 – Bonatti–Gobbi route on the Grand Pilier d'Angle, first solo ascent.
- 1977 – Santa Cruz Sur (6259m) by the N ridge, first ascent (solo), Cordillera Blanca, Peru.
- 1977 – Pucaranra (6147m) by the northwest ridge, first ascent (solo), Cordillera Blanca, Peru.
- 1977 – Palcaraju (6274m) by the Southeast Ridge, first ascent (solo), Cordillera Blanca, Peru.
- 1978 – Chacraraju Este (6001m), first solo of the peak, Cordillera Blanca, Peru.
- 1978 – Abasraju (5765m), solo and first ascent of the peak, Cordillera Blanca, Peru.
- 1978 – Taulliraju (5830m) by S face and SSE ridge, first ascent (solo), Cordillera Blanca, Peru.
- 1979 – Tsacra Grande Oeste (5774m) - first ascent of peak (with Al Rouse and Brian Hall), Cordillera Huayhuash, Peru.
- 1979 – Trapecio (5653m) by south-west ridge - first ascent (with Al Rouse and Brian Hall), Cordillera Huayhuash, Peru.

== See also ==
- List of ski descents of eight-thousanders
- List of 20th-century summiters of Mount Everest
