= Lhotse Shar =

Mountain in the Himalayas

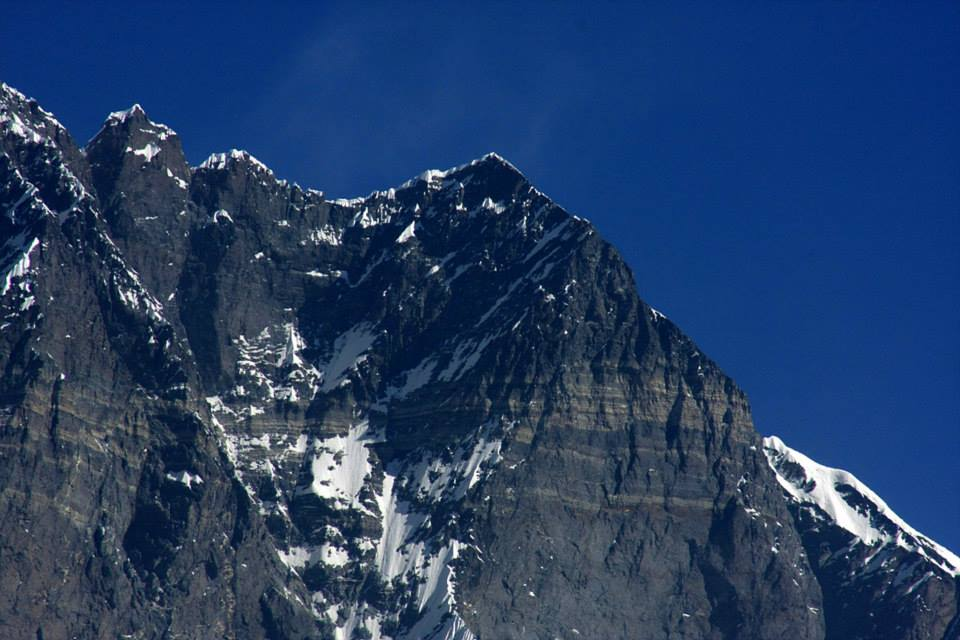
- Lhotse Shar in 2014

Highest point
- Elevation: 8,383 m (27,503 ft)
- Prominence: 86 m (282 ft)
- Parent peak: Lhotse
- Isolation: 0.62 km (0.39 mi)
- Listing: Eight-thousander
- Coordinates: 27°57′30″N 86°56′36″E

Geography
- Location within Nepal
- Location: Nepal (Khumbu); China (Tibet Autonomous Region)
- Parent range: Mahalangur Himal

Climbing
- First ascent: 12 May 1970

Tibetan name
- Tibetan: ལྷོ་རྩེ་ཤར
- Literal meaning: South peak East (Note: NB: Lhotse literally means "South peak", so Lhotse Shar means Lhotse East)
Transcriptions
- Wylie: lho rtse shar
- Tibetan Pinyin: Lhozê Xar

Lhotse Shar is a subpeak of Lhotse, at 8,383 m (27,503 ft) high. It was first climbed by Sepp Mayerl and Rolf Walter on 12 May 1970.

== Climbing routes and dangers ==
Lhotse Shar forms the eastern highpoint of Lhotse’s central ridge, far from the main summit's standard route of ascent via the Reiss Couloir. As the ridge and Lhotse's central summits are themselves extremely difficult climbs, a traverse to the Shar along the main ridge is impractical and prospective climbers must instead ascend Lhotse’s huge vertical rise from outside the Western Cwm. Most opt for the southeastern flank of the Shar itself, or the most direct route, up Lhotse's South Face.

The steep pyramid of the Shar inevitably forces climbers across exposed rock bands and avalanche-prone slopes in all directions, and these routes have consequently seen many fatalities; indeed, of Lhotse's documented deaths as of 2021, a third (11 of 31) have occurred on Lhotse Shar. It has the highest fatality rate of all principal or secondary eight-thousander summits – for every two people who summit the mountain, one person dies attempting to. The mountain's extreme height further compounds the danger: At 8,383 metres above sea level, it is 292 m (958 ft) higher than Annapurna I Main, the next-deadliest summit of the eight-thousanders, and well into the Death zone, greatly increasing the risk of altitude sickness for climbers.

== Incidents ==
- On 27 April 1980, Nicolas Jaeger was seen for the last time at 8,200 metres (26,900 ft) altitude on Lhotse Shar, and is presumed dead. Jaeger was attempting a traverse from the Shar to Lhotse Main.
- 27 September 1987 saw the single deadliest day on Lhotse Shar, as four Spanish climbers fell 1,500 meters to their deaths in an avalanche. The partial recovery of the team's remains by British climbers Alan and Adrian Burgess is recounted in Jon Krakauer's 1990 compendium Eiger Dreams: Ventures Among Men and Mountains.
