= Andrzej Czok =

Polish mountaineer (1948–1986)

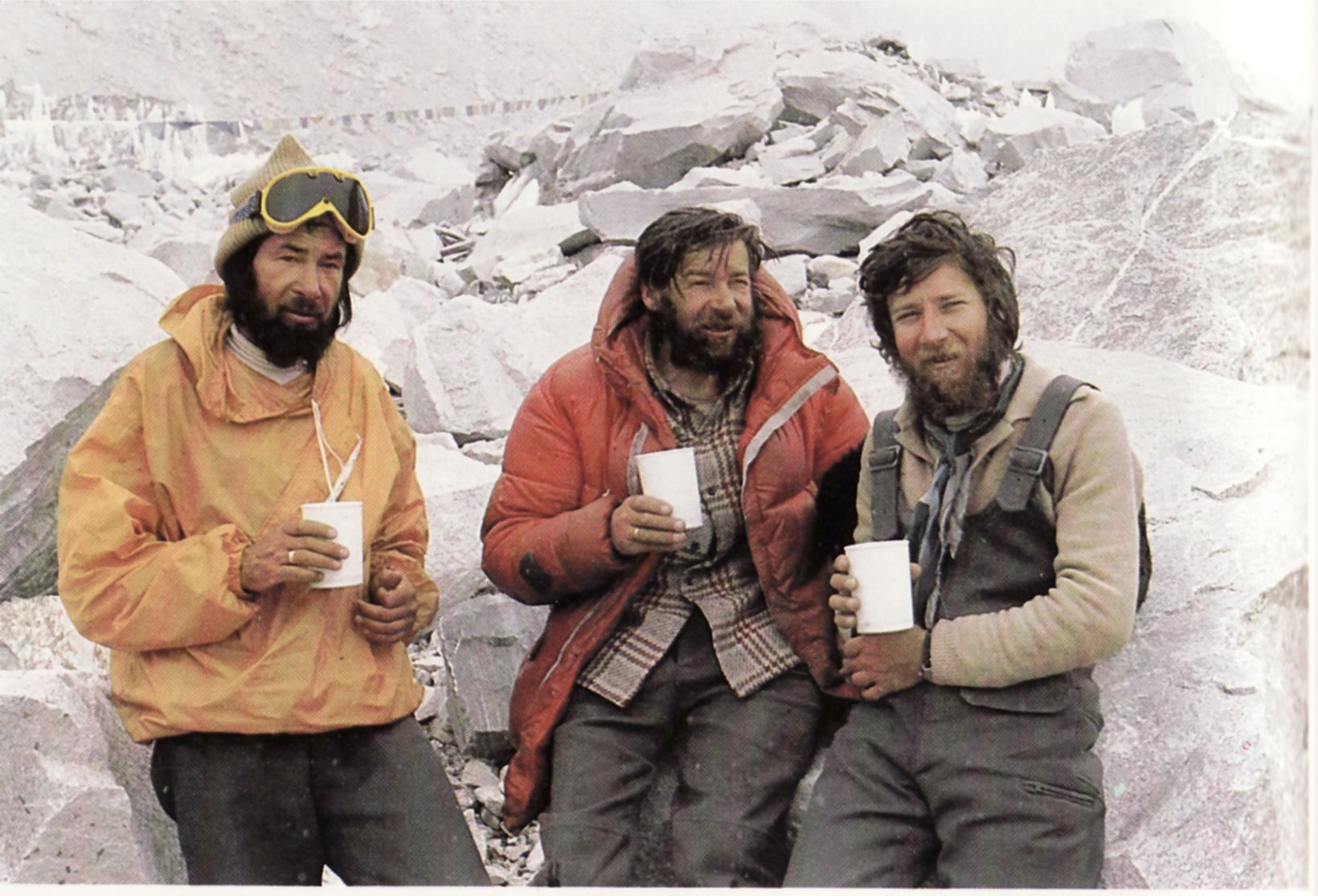
Andrzej Czok (right) with Andrzej Heinrich and Kazimierz Olech, Mount Everest in 1980

Andrzej Czok (11 November 1948 – 11 January 1986) was a Polish mountaineer best known for making the first winter ascent of Dhaulagiri on 21 January 1985 with Jerzy Kukuczka, and for the first ascent of the South Pillar route on Mount Everest in 1980 (also with Kukuczka). He suffered a pulmonary oedema while making a winter attempt on Kangchenjunga in 1985–86 and died at Camp III. He was buried nearby in a crevasse.

== See also ==
- List of 20th-century summiters of Mount Everest
