= Alison Chadwick-Onyszkiewicz =

English mountaineer and painter

- Alison Chadwick-Onyszkiewicz on Annapurna between camps II and III. Photographed by Arlene Blum.

Personal information
- Nationality: British
- Born: 1942 Birmingham, England
- Died: 17 October 1978 (aged 35–36) Annapurna I Middle Peak, Nepal

Climbing career
- Type of climber: Mountaineering
- First ascents: Gasherbrum III

Alison Chadwick-Onyszkiewicz (1942 – 17 October 1978) was a British mountaineer, painter, and lithography lecturer. She made the first ascent of Gasherbrum III, at the time the highest unclimbed mountain in the world. Chadwick-Onyszkiewicz died along with her climbing partner, Vera Watson, during an attempt on Annapurna I Central.

== Early life ==
Chadwick-Onyszkiewicz was born in Birmingham and grew up in Cornwall. She studied at Slade School of Fine Arts in London where she learned to climb. In 1969, she taught lithography at the College of Exeter.

== Climbing career ==
Chadwick-Onyszkiewicz's early climbs were in Wales, England, and the Alps, making ascents of the north faces of Piz Palü, the Aiguille de Triolet, and Les Courtes. After moving to Poland with her husband and climbing partner Janusz Onyszkiewicz, she climbed extensively in the Tatras, including the eastern wall of Mnich, the northern wall of Kazalnica Mięguszowiecka, and a winter ascent of the northern wall of Niżnie Rysy and Mieguszowiecki Middle (first winter ascent). She was known for her cool head and early commitment to alpine style mountaineering, which involves moving quickly and independently towards summits, at a time when large siege style expeditions were more common.

In 1972, during the Polish expedition in Hindu Kush, she ascended both Aspe Safed and Noshaq. Based on these climbs, she was selected for the 1975 Polish Gasherbrum Expedition. It was initially designed as a women's only expedition to Gasherbrum III led by Wanda Rutkiewicz, but a simultaneous men's expedition to Gasherbrum II was refused a permit and the two merged. She made the first ascent of Gasherbrum III (7952m), the world's highest unclimbed peak, with a mixed team consisting of her, Rutkiewicz, Onyszkiewicz, and Krzysztof Zdzitowiecki. During this expedition she gained the British height record for women.

Following the height record, she was elected to membership of the Alpine Club, one of the first women to be so.

Despite these successes, the achievements of women's climbing continued to be downplayed, with critics noting the presence and contributions of men on female-driven expeditions.

=== Annapurna ===
In 1978, she took part in the American Women's Himalayan Expedition to Annapurna, the tenth-highest mountain in the world. It consisted of all female climbers, designed to give women the opportunity to climb a major peak at a time when they were often excluded from expeditions. Chadwick-Onyszkiewicz was one of the few non-Americans and was considered one of the best climbers. Annapurna had very few ascents at the time, and the climbers found it to be more treacherous than anticipated, with multiple avalanches causing severe delays in their progress. It is now considered the world's most deadly mountain, with the highest death rate of any 8000er. During the expedition Chadwick-Onyszkiewicz noted, "It's the most dangerous mountain I've been on," in a letter to her husband.

The expedition was successful, with Vera Komarkova, Irene Beardsley (formerly Miller), Mingma Tsering Sherpa, and Chewang Ringjin Sherpa reaching the summit. However, Chadwick-Onyszkiewicz was keen for a female-only team to succeed, so she and climbing partner Vera Watson made a second summit push to the unclimbed second peak. Since many of the climbers had already descended due to frostbite and sickness or were too exhausted, they departed Camp III for the summit alone and with very little support in the upper camps.

They missed a scheduled radio call that night, but others in the expedition were tired and unable to mount a rescue. Three days later Mingma and Lhakpa Norbu Sherpa found their bodies next to a crevasse below Camp IV. It was speculated that they fell on an ice slope near camp V, perhaps due to an avalanche or rockfall.

A memorial fund, administered by the Mount Everest Foundation, was created in her memory. Its aim is "to provide grants to further British and Polish women's mountaineering in the world's greater ranges, i.e.: further afield than the Alps".

== Personal life ==
In 1971 Chadwick-Onyszkiewicz married Polish mathematician and mountaineer Janusz Onyszkiewicz, her frequent climbing partner.

== Notable climbs ==
- Mięguszowiecki Middle (first winter ascent)
- Gasherbrum III (first ascent)
- Noshaq, Hindu Kush
