= Mansikka =

Mansikka is a surname, meaning strawberry in Finnish. It may refer to:

- Martti Mansikka (born 1933), Finnish gymnast
- Samuli Mansikka (1978–2015), Finnish mountaineer and trekking guide
- Tommy Mansikka-Aho, Finnish folk and popular music musician, member of Finnish band Edea
