= Arlene Blum =

American mountaineer and scientist (born 1945)

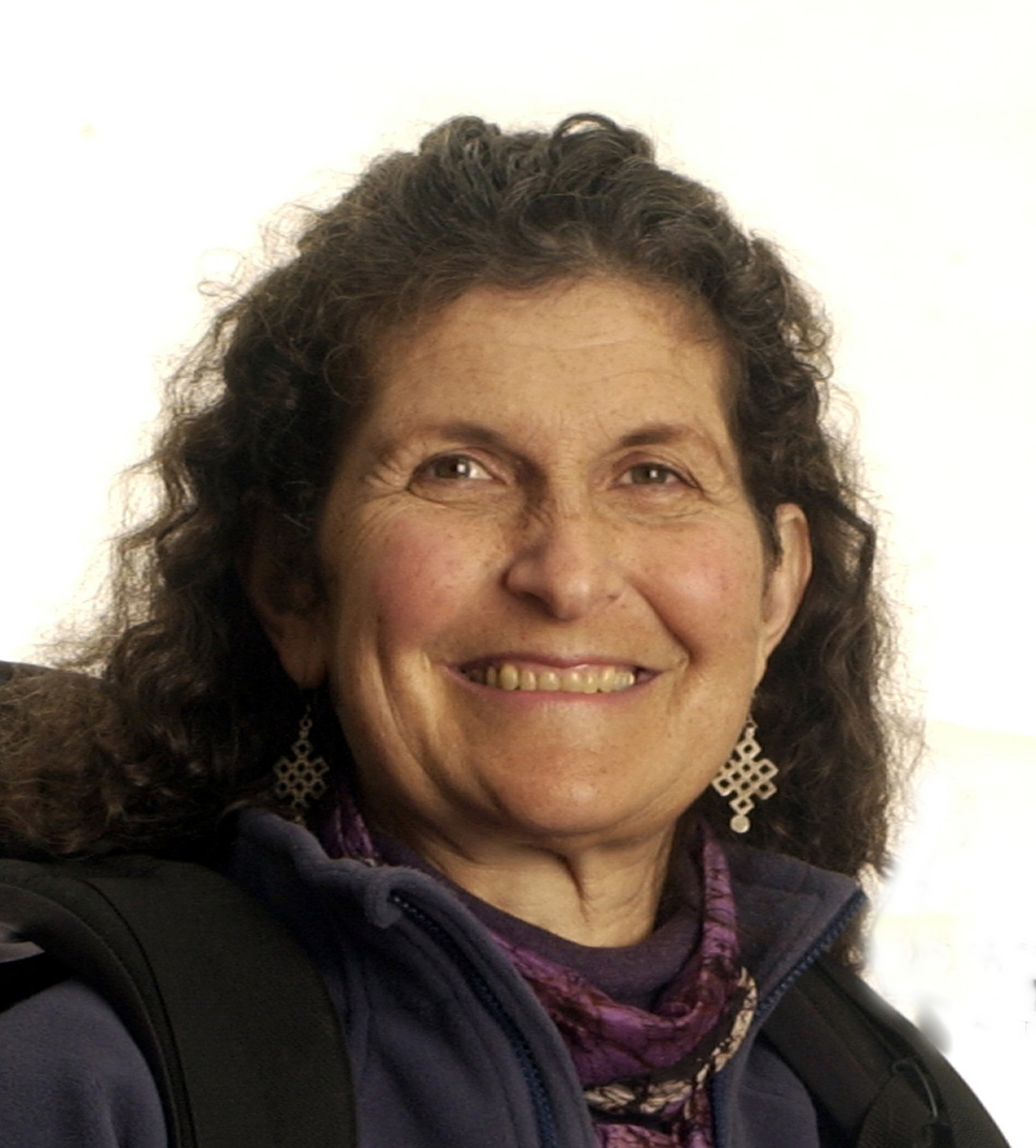
- Arlene Blum in 2003
- Born: March 1, 1945 (age 81); Davenport, Iowa, US
- Education: Reed College, BA; University of California, Berkeley, PhD
- Occupations: Mountaineer, writer, Environmental health scientist
- Known for: Leading first American and also all-woman ascent of Annapurna; Environmental health research
- Notable work: Annapurna: A Woman's Place; Breaking Trail: A Climbing Life
- Children: 1
- Website: http://www.arleneblum.com

Arlene Blum (born March 1, 1945) is an American mountaineer, writer, and environmental health scientist. She is best known for leading the first successful American ascent of Annapurna (I), a climb that was also an all-woman ascent. She led the first all-woman ascent of Denali ("Denali Damsels" expedition), and was the first American woman to attempt Mount Everest. She is executive director of the Green Science Policy Institute, an organization of scientists who develop and communicate peer-reviewed research to develop innovative solutions to reduce the use of toxic chemicals.

== Early life ==
Blum was born in Davenport, Iowa, and raised from the age of five on in Chicago by her Orthodox Jewish grandparents and mother. In the early 1960s, she attended Reed College in Portland, Oregon. Her first climb was in Washington, where she failed to reach the summit of Mount Adams. However, she persevered, climbing throughout her college and graduate school days. She was rejected from an Afghanistan expedition in 1969, with its leader writing to her, "One woman and nine men would seem to me to be unpleasant high on the open ice, not only in excretory situations but in the easy masculine companionship which is so vital a part of the joy of an expedition." However, she had been able to go climbing as part of her research for her senior thesis, which was on the topic of volcanic gases on Oregon's Mount Hood. In her thesis she predicted that one of the Pacific northwest volcanoes would soon erupt with devastating violence, and 14 years later Mt. St. Helens did have a violent eruption. Blum graduated from Reed in 1966 and attended MIT and UC Berkeley, where she earned a PhD in biophysical chemistry in 1971. After graduate school, Blum embarked on what she called the "Endless Winter" – spending more than a year climbing peaks all over the world.

== Major climbs ==
In 1969, she applied to join an expedition to Denali in Alaska, and was told that women were welcome to come only as far as the base camp to "help with the cooking." Blum then organized and co-led the first all-woman team to ascend Denali in 1970. Blum participated in the second American effort to climb Mount Everest as part of the American Bicentennial Everest Expedition, but did not reach the summit.

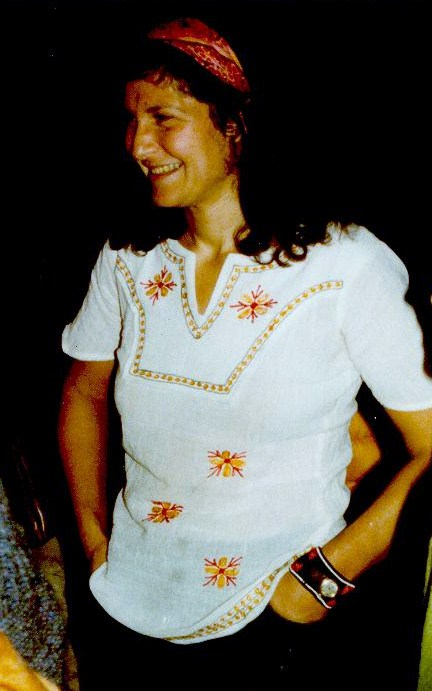
Arlene Blum in 1977 raising money for the Annapurna expedition

In 1978, she organized a team of eleven women to climb the tenth highest mountain in the world, Annapurna (I) in Nepal which, until then, had been climbed by only eight people (all men). It was called American Women's Himalayan Expeditions – Annapurna. They raised money for the trip in part by selling T-shirts with the slogan "A woman's place is on top". The first summit team, comprising Vera Komarkova and Irene Miller (now Beardsley) and Sherpas Mingma Tsering and Chewang Ringjing, reached the top at 3:30 p.m. on October 15, 1978. The second summit team, Alison Chadwick-Onyszkiewicz and Vera Watson, died during their climb. After the event, Blum wrote a book about her experience on Annapurna, called Annapurna: A Woman's Place.

In 1980 she led a team of Indian and American women that made the first ascent of Bhrigupanth in the Indian Himalayas. She then made what she called the "Great Himalayan Traverse", a two-thousand-mile journey adjacent to beautiful peaks of the Himalayas from Bhutan to India with trekker Hugh Swift. She and her partner Rob Gomersall crossed the Alps from Yugoslavia to France, bearing their baby Annalise in a backpack.

== Early scientific work ==
As a graduate student at UC Berkeley, Blum predicted the correct three-dimensional structure for transfer RNA, an essential building block in all organisms, by stringing hippie beads for the nine known tRNA sequences in four colors to represent the four nucleic acid bases, pairing the bases, and folding them into a logical structure.

While a post doc in the Stanford biochemistry department, she discovered the first physical evidence for intermediate states in the folding of protein molecules doing "temperature jump NMR," a technique she imagined while watching water melting from a glacier in Central Asia. Her Stanford advisor, Robert Baldwin, stated in his oral history that this work was a first step towards solving the problem of the mechanism of protein folding.

Blum's research with biochemist Bruce Ames at the UC Berkeley found that the flame retardant called Tris, used at high levels in most children's pajamas in the middle of the 1970s, was a mutagen and likely carcinogen. Three months after their 1977 paper in Science was published, children's sleepwear containing Tris was banned in the United States.

== Science policy work ==
After a 26-year long hiatus, Blum returned to science and policy work in 2006—when her daughter started college—and her memoir Breaking Trail: A Climbing Life was published. She discovered that the same Tris her research had helped remove from children's pajamas was back in American couches and baby products.

As a result, Blum founded the Green Science Policy Institute (GSP) in 2007 to bring scientific research results to decision makers in government and industry to protect human health and the environment from toxic chemicals. Blum and her team collaborate with scientists on policy-relevant research projects and translate scientific information to educate decision makers, the press, and the public. The Institute's work has contributed to many policies and business practices that reduce the use of toxic chemicals, particularly halogenated chemicals such as flame retardants, antimicrobials, and per- and polyfluoroalkyl substances (PFAS).

== Writing ==
Her first book, Annapurna: A Woman's Place was included in Fortune Magazine's 2005 list of "The 75 Smartest Business Books We Know" and chosen by National Geographic Adventure Magazine as one of the 100 top adventure books of all time. Her award-winning memoir, Breaking Trail: A Climbing Life tells the story of how Blum realized improbable dreams among the world's highest mountains, in the chemistry laboratory, and in public policy.

Along with several peer-reviewed publications, Blum has published articles about science policy in The New York Times, Science magazine, Los Angeles Times, and The Huffington Post.

== Awards and other activities ==
For her mountaineering accomplishments, Blum was the winner of the Sierra Club's Francis P. Farquhar Mountaineering Award for 1982. She holds a Gold Medal from the Society of Woman Geographers, an honor previously given to only eight other women including Amelia Earhart, Margaret Mead, and Mary Leakey. The American Alpine Club inducted Blum into its Hall of Mountaineering Excellence in 2012. At the National PFAS Coalition meeting, Arlene Blum received the 2026 Trailblazer Award.

For her science and policy work, Blum won the Purpose Prize in 2008, an award for those over 60 who are solving society's greatest problems. In 2010, the National Women's History Project selected her as one of "100 Women Taking the Lead to Save Our Planet". In 2014 she was inducted into the Alameda County Women's Hall of Fame for Science, Engineering and Technology and received the Benjamin Ide Wheeler Medal as the city of Berkeley's "most useful citizen". In 2015, her alma mater Reed College awarded her the Thomas Lamb Eliot Award for Lifetime Achievement. In 2018 Blum was inducted into the California Hall of Fame. In 2022, she was granted an honorary doctorate by the University of San Francisco. 2024 Blum was recognized as one of 50 Forbes Sustainability Leaders.

Arlene Blum is the founder of the annual Berkeley Himalayan Fair and the Burma Village Assistance Project. She serves on the board of the Plastic Pollution Coalition.

== Quotes ==
- "With a global and virtual expedition team, we are attempting challenging and important mountains and reaching for the summit of a healthier world to benefit us all."
- "The health and environmental problem from such chemicals could be as threatening as climate change, but I believe it is a problem that can be solved relatively easily. It's a matter of informing the public – and political will."
- "My new adventure in science and policy work is the most challenging and important of my life and I feel lucky to look out at the horizon and see endless rows of mountains to climb."
- "In America, foods, drugs and pesticides are regulated, you may say they are not well enough regulated, but you really have to provide information because those are the things that go into our mouths. Other chemicals like flame retardants are not regulated, there are not really health requirements but they go into our bodies the same way."

== Personal life ==
Blum lives and works in Berkeley, California. She has a daughter, Annalise Blum, a 2010 graduate of Stanford University in environmental engineering. In 2017 Annalise earned a Ph.D. in Civil Engineering at Tufts University. In March, 2023, Annalise was appointed Deputy Assistant Secretary for Water and Science in the U.S. Department of the Interior.
