= Mięguszowiecki Szczyt Czarny =

Mountain between Poland and Slovakia

- Východný Mengusovský štít
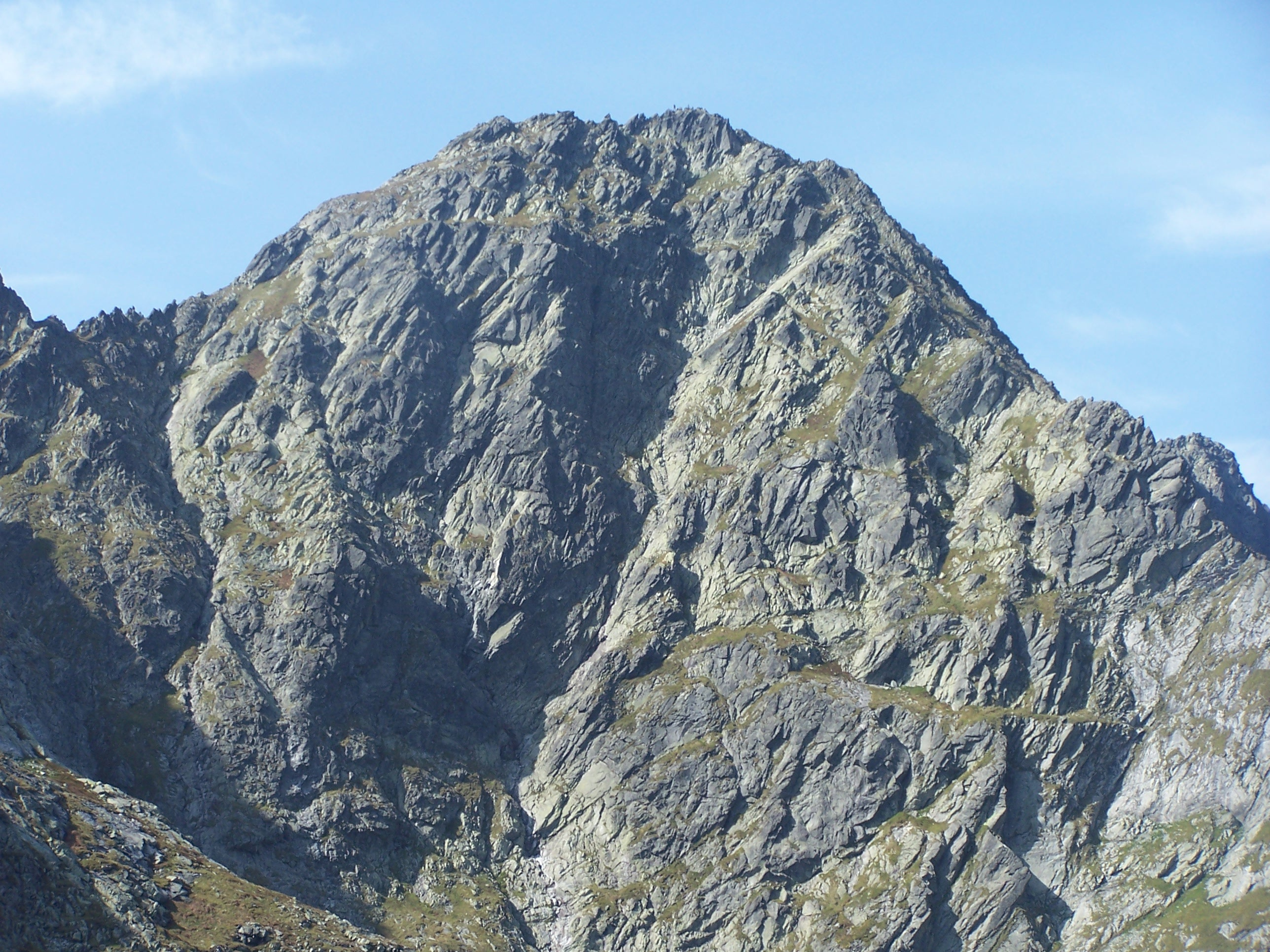
- Seen from the East

Highest point
- Elevation: 2,404 m (7,887 ft)
- Prominence: 97 m (318 ft)
- Coordinates: 49°10′58″N 20°04′03″E

Geography
- Countries: Poland and Slovakia
- Regions: Lesser Poland and Prešov
- Parent range: High Tatras, Tatra Mountains

Climbing
- First ascent: before 1903

Mięguszowiecki Szczyt Czarny (Slovak: Východný Mengusovský štít) is a mountain situated on the main ridge of the Tatra Mountains in the High Tatras mountain range on the border between Poland and Slovakia and is the easternmost of the three Mięguszowiecki Summits. Its peak has an elevation of 2404 meters, making it the fourth highest mountain in Poland.
