= Mięguszowiecki Szczyt Wielki =

Mountain in High Tatras, Slovakia

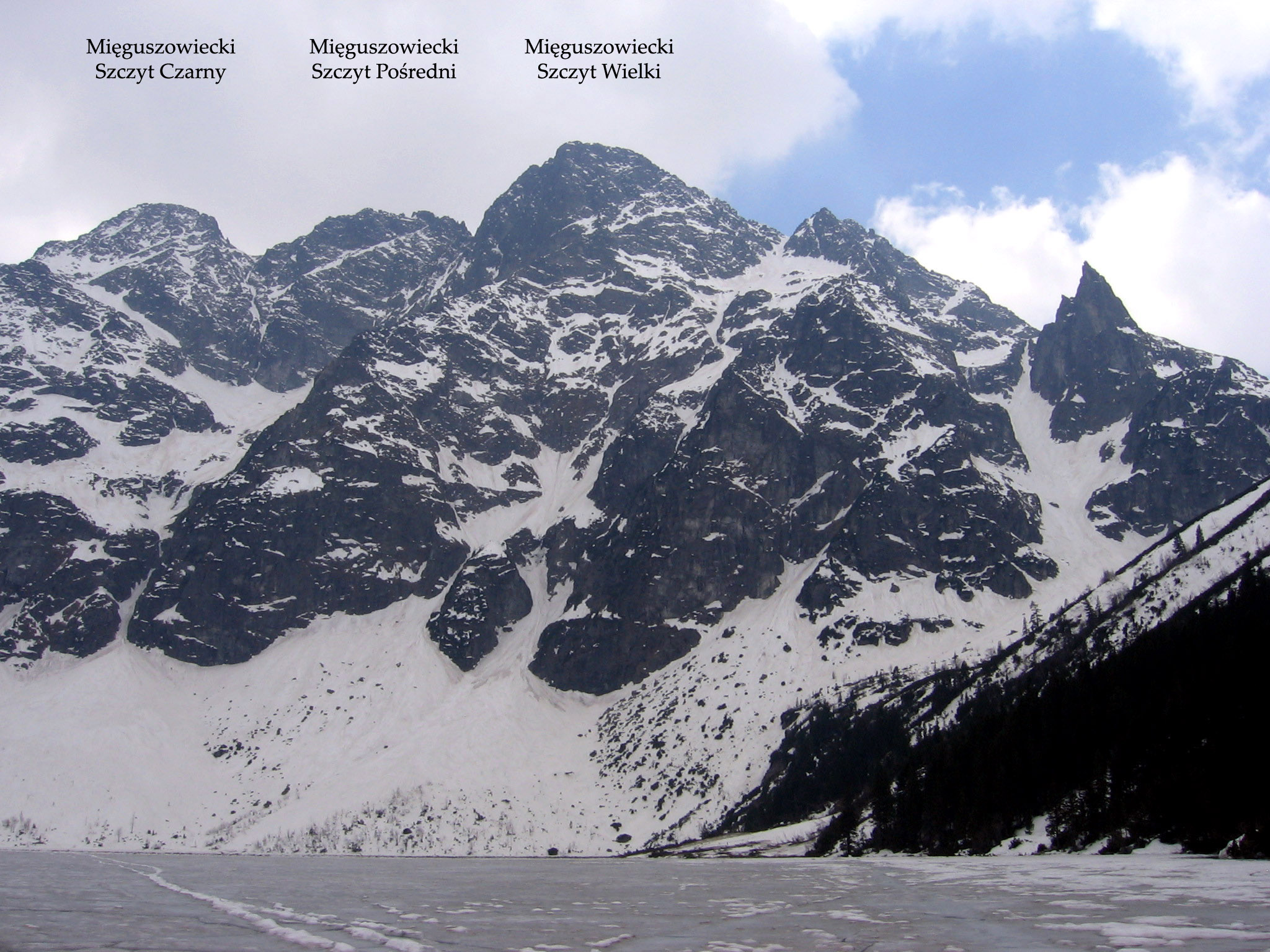
- Three Mięguszowieckie Summits; the highest one is to the right.

Highest point
- Elevation: 2,438 m (7,999 ft)
- Prominence: 173 m (568 ft)
- Listing: Mountains of Poland
- Coordinates: 49°11′14″N 20°3′36″E

Geography
- Location within Poland Location within Slovakia
- Countries: Poland and Slovakia
- Parent range: Tatras

Climbing
- First ascent: 1877 by Ludwik Chałubiński, Wojciech Roj and Maciej Sieczka

Mięguszowiecki Szczyt Wielki or the Mięguszowiecki Grand Peak (Slovak: Veľký Mengusovský štít) is a mountain in the Tatra Mountains, located on the border between Poland and Slovakia.

It is the highest of the three Mięguszowiecki Summits and the second-highest mountain in Poland after Rysy (2,503 metres, the highest peak in the Polish Tatras).

== Gallery ==
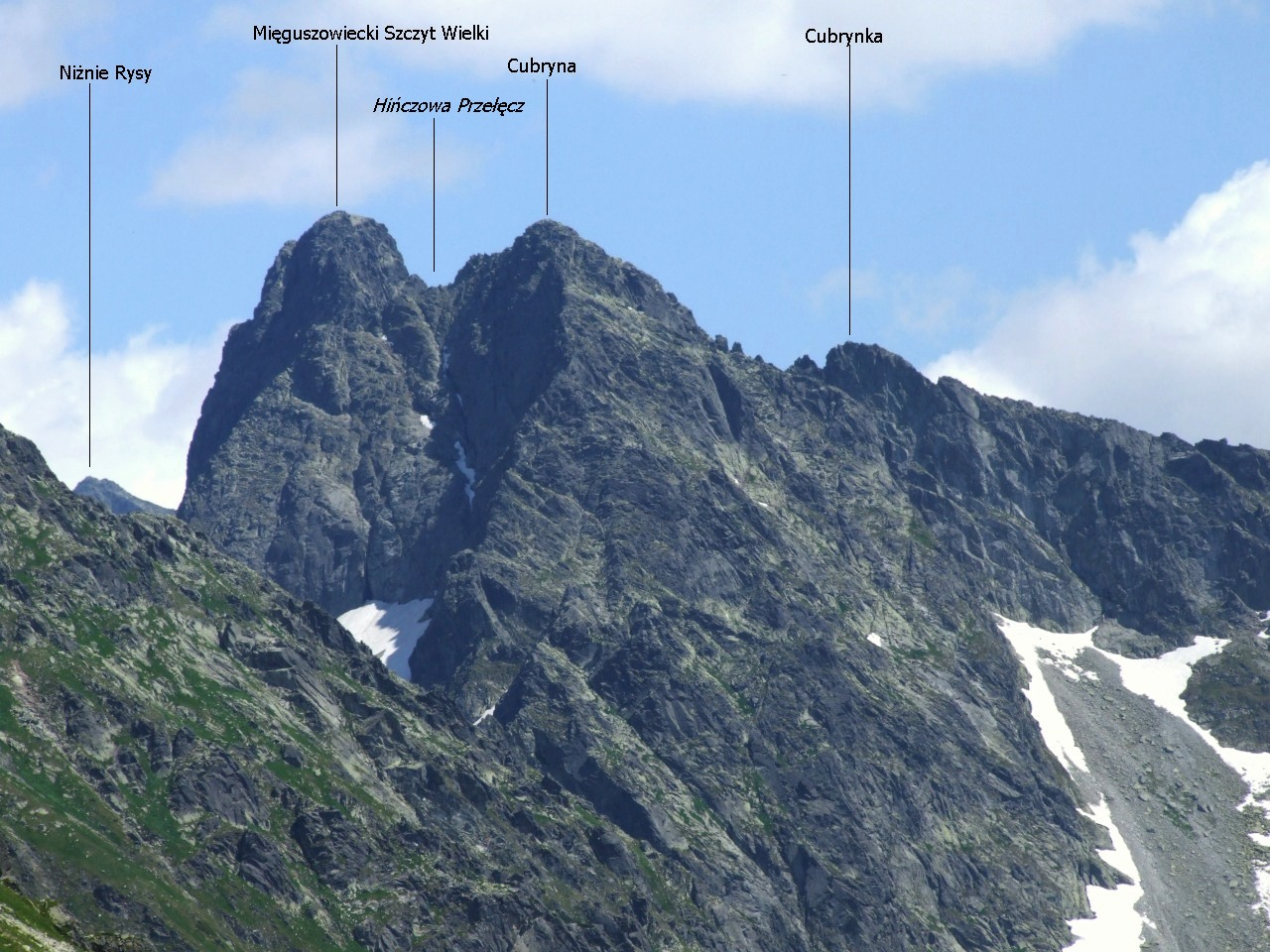
Mięguszowiecki Szczyt Wielki (left), view from Zawory

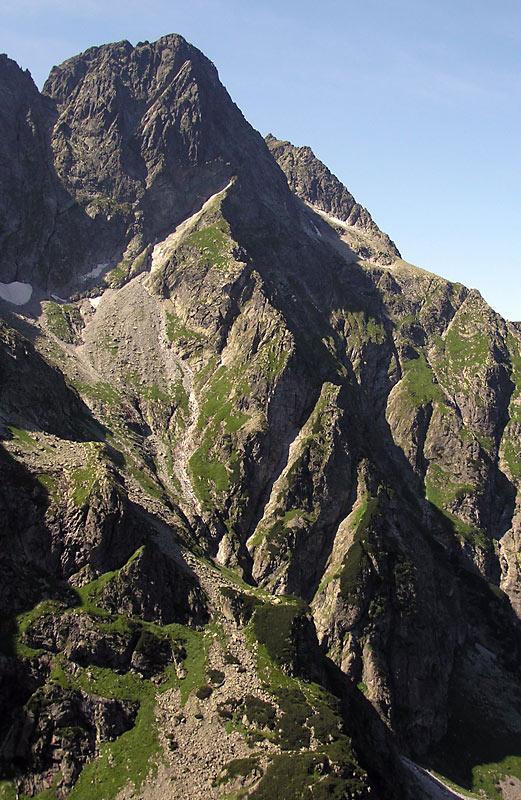
North-eastern slope "Filar Mięgusza" leading to Morskie Oko

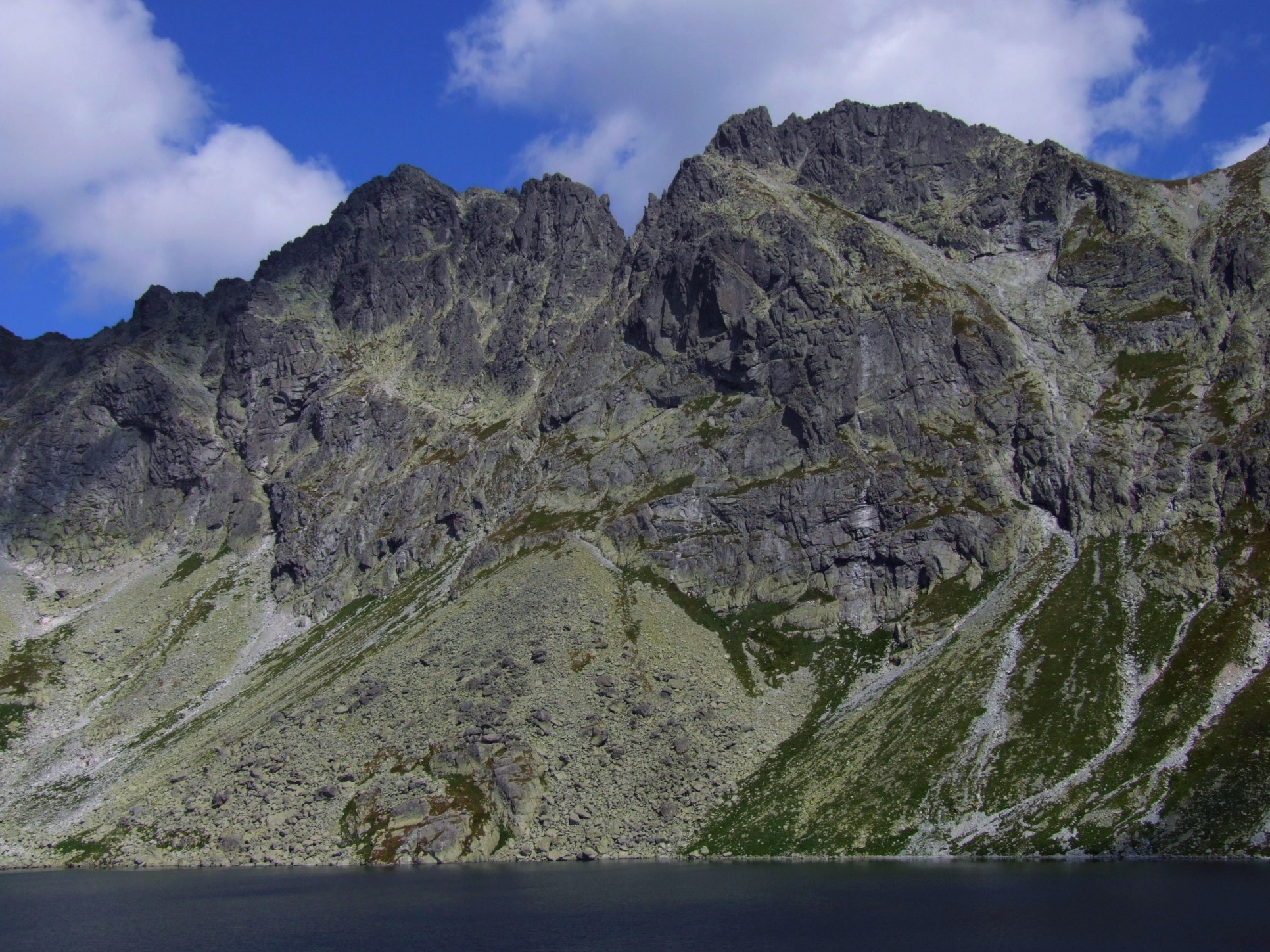
Mięguszowieckie Summits

Media related to Mięguszowiecki Szczyt Wielki at Wikimedia Commons
