= Vera Watson =

Computer programmer and mountaineer

- Born: 1932; Dalian, China
- Died: October 17, 1978 (aged 45–46); Annapurna I, Nepal
- Cause of death: Fall
- Occupation: Computer programmer
- Employer: IBM Research
- Organization: American Women's Himalayan Expedition
- Known for: First woman's solo climb of Aconcagua
- Spouse: John McCarthy

Vera Watson (1932 – October 17, 1978) was an American computer programmer, mountaineer and rock climber who made the first woman's solo climb of Aconcagua, the highest mountain in the Americas. She also made several first ascents in the Kenai Mountains in Alaska. She was a member of the successful first all-women team to climb Annapurna, but was killed along with her climbing partner Alison Chadwick-Onyszkiewicz while preparing to attempt the unclimbed central summit of the mountain.

== Biography ==
Watson was born in Dalian, China into a Russian family. The city had long had a Russian influence as the former Russian Dalian. She lived in China until the 1950s, when her parents relocated to Brazil. She later emigrated to England and then the United States. Her background helped her become adept at languages. Watson would later be hired at IBM in Yorktown, New York when IBM research was looking for someone with Russian language skills.

In her thirties, Watson began mountain and rock climbing. First she climbed close to home, in the Shawangunk Ridge and on Mount Washington.

Watson later moved from Yorktown to work at IBM Research in San Jose, California in 1973. She was initially active in machine translation, before moving into database management system design. She worked on System R, which was the first implementation of SQL, a standardized database query language which has since become a dominant standard. Watson was married to John McCarthy, a pioneer in the discipline of artificial intelligence and creator of the Lisp programming language.

After moving to the western United States, Watson continued climbing and mountaineering on bigger peaks and soon started expedition climbing. In 1974, she took leave without pay from IBM to make the first woman's solo attempt on Aconcagua. That year she would also climb Mount Robson and make some first ascents in the Kenai Range.

=== Annapurna climb ===
In 1978, Watson joined the American Women's Himalayan Expedition to climb Annapurna alongside her IBM colleague Irene Beardsley. At the time, the first women's expedition made headlines. Watson shared, "Once we've done it, I think other women will take more initiative to get into mixed teams and become more aggressive about organizing their own expeditions".

On October 17, 1978 while roped to climbing partner Alison Chadwick-Onyszkiewicz, the pair slipped near Camp V and fell to their deaths. Watson was 46 years old. At the time of her death, her husband made a statement, “She was a woman with a taste for achievement, and I encouraged her to make this ascent.”

== See also ==
- American Women's Himalayan Expedition
