= Vera Komarkova =

Czechoslovak mountain climber

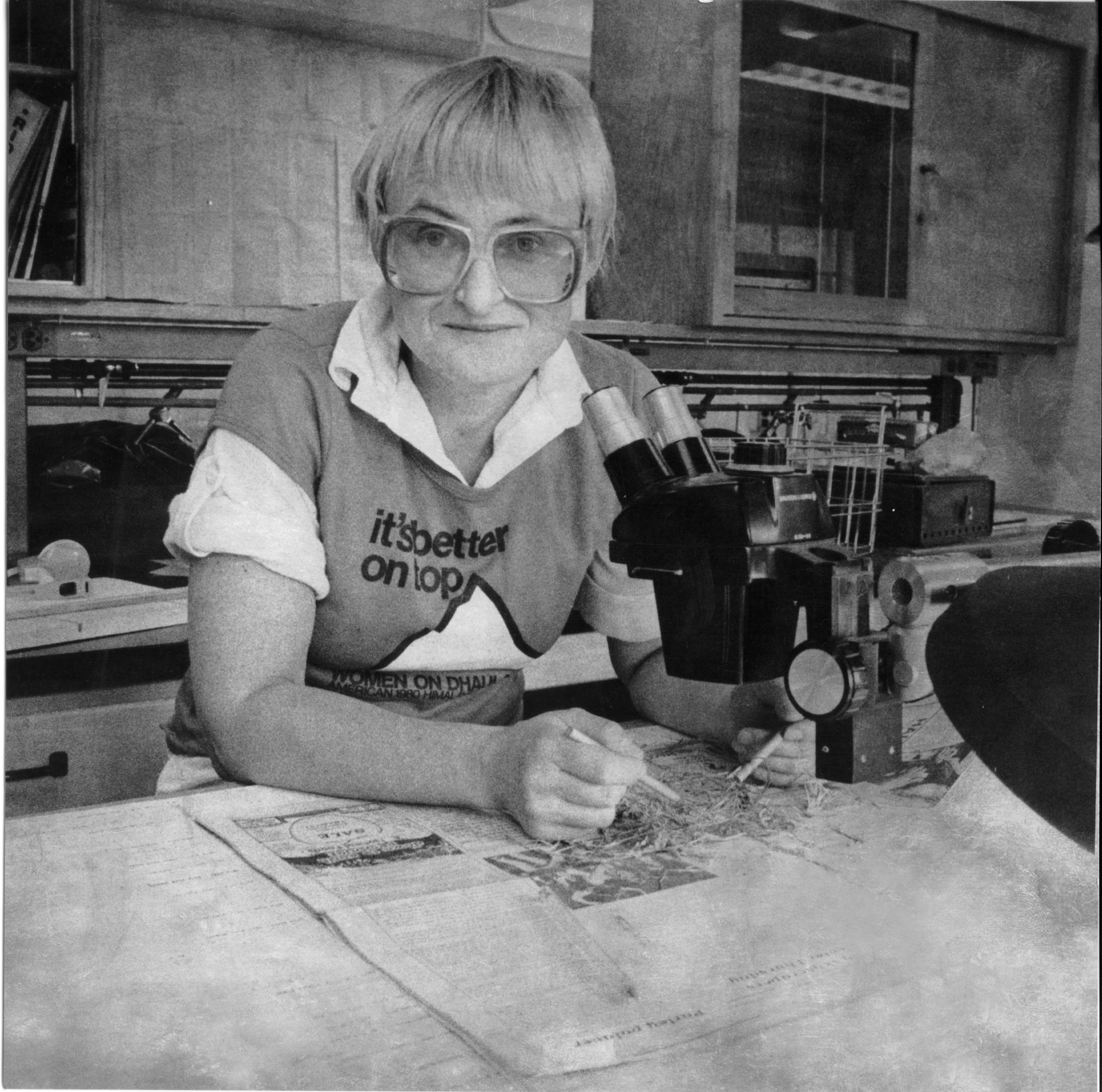

Personal information
- Nationality: American, Czech
- Born: Vera Růžičková; 25 December 1942 Písek, Protectorate of Bohemia and Moravia (now Czech Republic)
- Died: 25 May 2005 (aged 62) Leysin, Switzerland
- Education: Univerzita Karlova; University of Colorado

Climbing career
- Type of climber: Mountaineering
- Known for: First female ascent of Annapurna and Cho Oyu
- Updated on 20 September 2017

Vera Komarkova (Czech: Věra Komárková) (25 December 1942 - 25 May 2005) was a prominent Czech-American mountaineer and botanist. Credited as a pioneer of women's mountaineering, she was the first woman to summit Annapurna and Cho Oyu.

== Early life ==
Komarkova was born on the Christmas Day of 1942 in Písek and at the age of 16 she got to the Charles University in Prague to study botany, from which she eventually graduated. There, she discovered climbing and began making first ascents in the Tatras and other Carparthians.

== Climbing ==
=== Alaska ===
In 1976 she climbed Denali and the next year she opened a new route on Mount Dickey. These exploits impressed Arlene Blum so she invited Komarkova to her Annapurna expedition in 1978.

=== Annapurna ===
The expedition was organised by Arlene Blum after she returned from an Everest expedition "marred by male chauvinist traits". Irene Miller recommended Komarkova immediately as they had ascended Mount Doonerak together and her Alaskan exploits were well known.

To raise funds for the 1978 expedition, the team sold T-shirts with the slogan "A woman's place is on top". The T-shirts sales raised $60,000, which was over 75% of the estimated costs of the expedition. They were also sponsored by ob tampons, which Komarkova noted was "the unexpected advantage of an all-women team".

Komarkova was an "enigmatic" personality on the mountain, reportedly unfazed by the avalanches and unimpressed by group discussions or collaborative leadership. Although other climbers like Blum and Alison Chadwick-Onyszkiewicz were in favour of women-only summit attempts, she pushed to have Sherpas Mingma and Chewang join them. Her tent was full of botanical samples she had collected along the way, with her climbing partner joking that there would be a "press release: climber killed by falling plant presses".

Komarkova and Miller, along with Sherpas Mingma and Chewang, reached the summit of Annapurna on October 15.

=== Himalayas ===
Komarkova led The American Women's Expedition up Dhaulagiri in 1980, but were pushed back by storms, avalanches and the death of a team member. She retired from climbing after a successful expedition to Cho Oyu with Dina Štěrbová and Sherpas Ang Rita and Nuru, becoming the first woman to reach the summit.

== Academia ==
In the 1970s, Komarkova moved to Boulder, Colorado, and earned a PhD in plant ecology. Her dissertation was published as a book "Alpine Vegetation of the Indian Peaks Area". She was described by her colleague, Adolf Ceska, as "the greatest phytosociologist in the United States", but too far ahead of her time for mainstream recognition.

Komarkova used Braun-Blanquet methods to classify plants floristically, a method unpopular in the United States, that gained recognition in 2004.

She returned to Europe in 1986 and worked at the American College of Switzerland in Leysin as Professor of Science and information technology.

== Personal life ==
In 1963 she married a fellow botanist and alpinist Jiří Komárek, 11 years her senior. She graduated the following year with masters of Biology.

After gaining her degree Komarkova and her three friends made a female group called Šlápoty ("The Footmarks") to walk from Czechoslovakia to Mexico City for the 1968 Summer Olympics. Their feat was followed by the Czechoslovak media, and they averaged 25 miles a day for almost a year. They walked across Europe to England, then took a ship to Canada, then went down to Mexico City.

While in Mexico, she climbed Ixtaccihuatl and was briefly married for a second time to a local man named Esquinoza Aquillar.

After Czechoslovakia was invaded by the Soviets and the borders closed, Komarkova emigrated to the United States taking her third husband with her.

In between her attempt on Dhaulagiri and ascent of Cho Oyu she gave birth to her first son, and her second after she returned. She raised them as a single mother in Europe.

== Death ==
Komarkova died on 25 May 2005, at the age of 62, at her home in Leysin, Switzerland of complications of breast cancer treatment.

== List of climbs ==
| Year | Peak |
|---|---|
| 1960 - 1969 | High Tatras, Carpathians, winter: 26 ascents, 3-day traverse of 10 summits; summer: 49 ascents, 3-day traverse of 12 summits; Many Rock Climbs in the sandstone regions of Czechoslovakia and Germany. |
| 1965 | Alps: Matterhorn (via Hornli ridge), Wildspitze, Sonnenspitze (South ridge) |
| 1967 | Alps: Petit Dru (normal route), Mont Blanc (from Col Tricot) |
| 1968 | Rocky Mountains: Crestone Needle (NE Ridge) Mexico: Huasteca Canyon, Pico Pirineos (E face) Mexico: Ixtaccihuatl (Las Inescalables de La Cabellera, La Ruta del Sol), Popocatepetl Mt. Blanc Group: Tour Ronde (normal route), Breithorn (N face) |
| 1971 | Yosemite Valley: Lower Brother, SW face and other short climbs Rocky Mountain National Park: Hallett Peak (Jackson-Johnson), Ypsilon Mountain (The Y Couloir), Hallett Peak (first Buttress (winter)) Eldorado Springs Canyon: The Naked Edge, and other rockclimbs |
| 1972 | Rocky Mountain National Park: Long's Peak (Kiener's Route), Hallett Peak (Northcutt-Carter Route); Sharkstooth Peak (N face) |
| 1974 | Yosemite Valley: Royal Arches, Snake Dike, other short climbs Rocky Mountain National Park: Hallett Peak (Love route); Notchtop Mountain Winter Climbs in Colorado Rocky Mountains |
| 1975 | Colorado Rocky Mountains: Pacific Peak (E ridge), North Arapaho Peak (winter) Brooks Range, Alaska: Mount Doonerak, Falsoola Mountain, Eeykaruk Mt. |
| 1976 | Alaska Range: Denali (S Buttress) |
| 1977 | Alaska Range: Mount Dickey (new route on SE face) |
| 1978 | Himalayas: Annapurna (N face, Dutch Rib) |
| 1980 | Himalayas: Dhaulagiri I (Pear Route attempt) |
| 1984 | Himalayas: Cho-Oyu |

== See also ==
- Arlene Blum
- American Women's Himalayan Expedition
