= Mięguszowiecki Szczyt Pośredni =

Mountain between Poland and Slovakia

- Prostredný Mengusovský štít
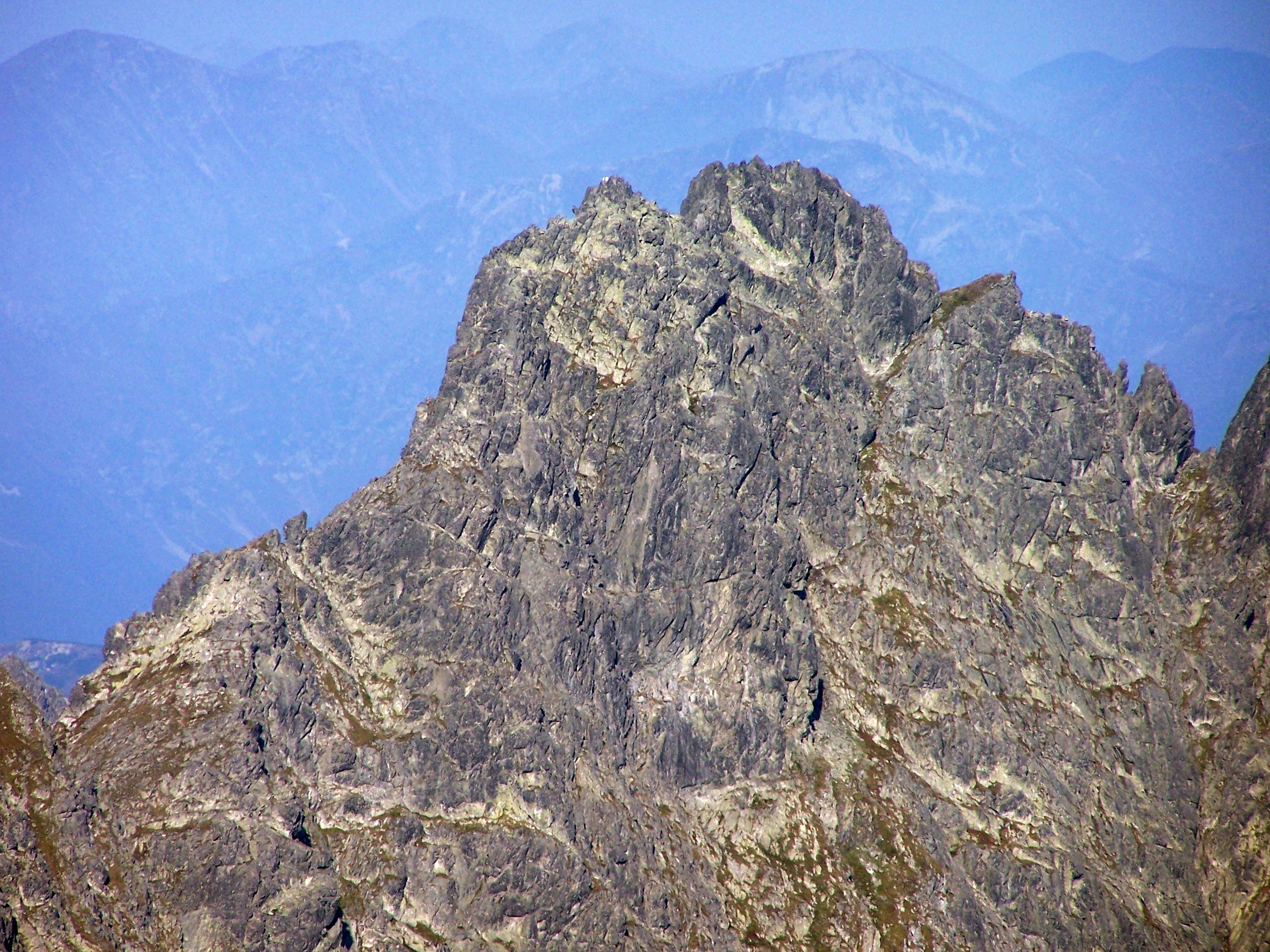

Highest point
- Elevation: 2,393 m (7,851 ft)
- Prominence: 63 m (207 ft)
- Coordinates: 49°11′05″N 20°03′47″E

Geography
- Countries: Poland and Slovakia
- Regions: Lesser Poland and Prešov
- Parent range: High Tatras, Tatra Mountains

Climbing
- First ascent: 1903 by Włodzimierz Boldireff and Stanisław Porębski

Mięguszowiecki Szczyt Pośredni (Slovak: Prostredný Mengusovský štít) is a mountain situated on the main ridge of the Tatra Mountains in the High Tatras mountain range on the border between Poland and Slovakia. It's the lowest of the three Mięguszowiecki Summits and it is located in the middle of the group. The peak has an elevation of 2393 meters, making it one of the highest mountains in Poland.
