= Samuli Mansikka =

Finnish mountaineer (1978–2015

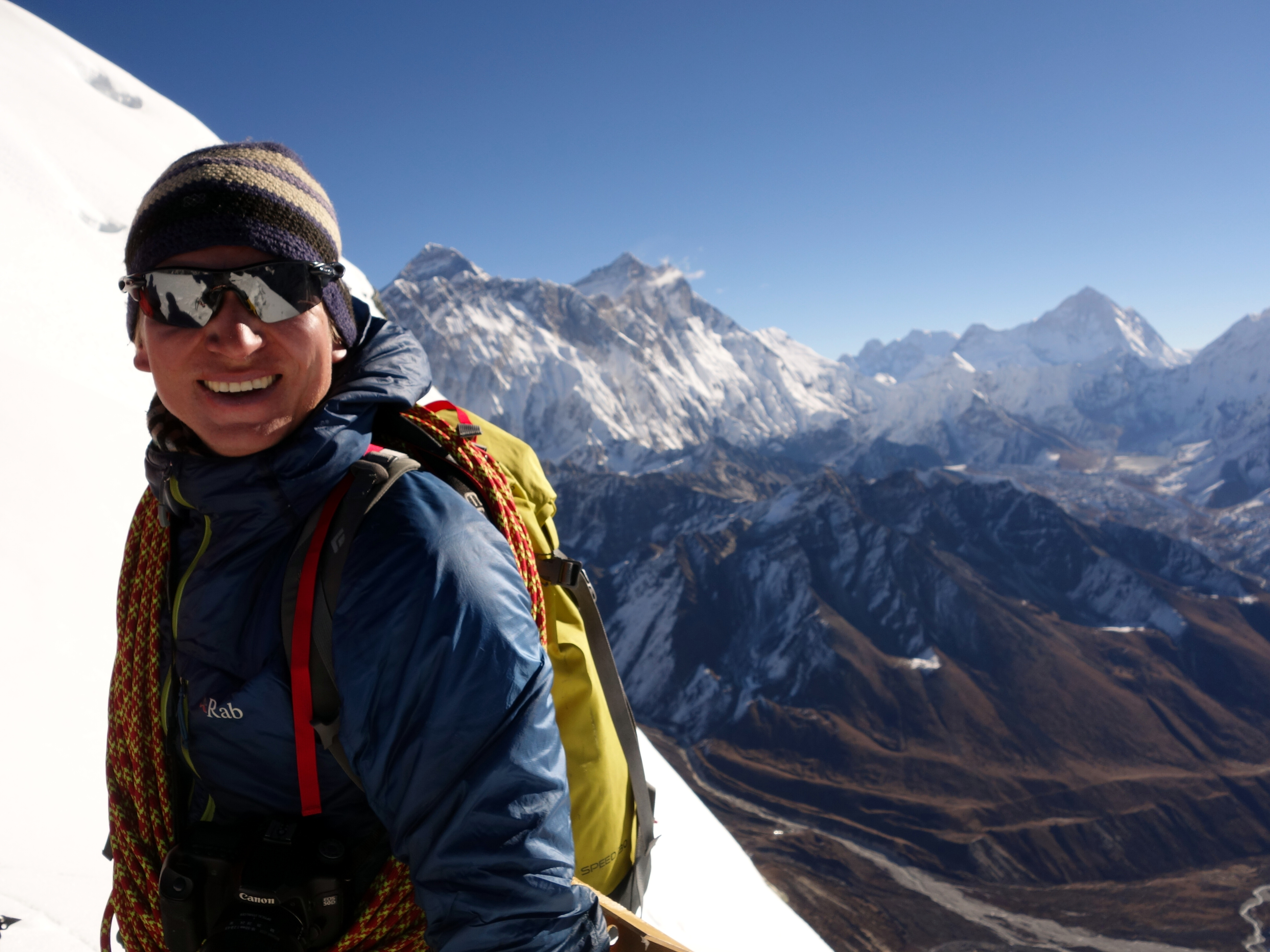
- Samuli Mansikka on Cholatse, Nepal, in November 2014, with Everest, Lhotse and Makalu, three of the 8000m peaks he climbed, behind
- Born: 28 July 1978; Finland
- Died: 24 March 2015 (aged 36); Annapurna, Nepal
- Occupations: Mountaineer, Trekking Guide, Expedition Leader
- Website: http://www.samulimansikka.com/

Samuli Mansikka (28 July 1978 – 24 March 2015), was a Finnish climber and expedition leader. He was president of the Finnish Alpine Club and a member of The Explorers Club. He was best known for climbing the world's 8,000 m peaks, many of them solo and without supplementary oxygen. He died in a fall while descending from Annapurna, his tenth 8,000 m summit.

== 8,000 m peak record ==
Samuli Mansikka climbed ten of the world's fourteen 8000m peaks. All of these climbs, with the exception of Everest and Lhotse, were completed without supplementary oxygen. He also reached the top of an eleventh, Shishapangma, but in poor visibility could not be sure whether he had reached the main summit or the slightly lower Central Summit.

- 2006. Cho Oyu, Tibet. Normal route without supplementary oxygen. Summit.
- 2008. Lhotse, Nepal. Normal route. Summit.
- 2008. Cho Oyu, Tibet. Normal route without supplementary oxygen. Summit.
- 2009. Everest, Nepal. Southeast Ridge route. Summit.
- 2009. Lhotse, Nepal. Normal route. Reached c.7950 m.
- 2009. Manaslu, Nepal. Normal route, solo without supplementary oxygen. Summit.
- 2010. Gasherbrum II, Pakistan. Normal route without supplementary oxygen. Summit.
- 2011. Dhaulagiri, Nepal. Normal route, solo without supplementary oxygen. Summit.
- 2012. Shishapangma, Tibet. Inaki Ochoa route without supplementary oxygen. Reached c.8000m.
- 2013. Makalu, Nepal. Northwest Face, solo without supplementary oxygen. Summit.
- 2014. Kangchenjunga, Nepal. Southwest Face, solo without supplementary oxygen. Summit.
- 2014. K2, Pakistan. Normal route, solo without supplementary oxygen. Summit.
- 2015. Annapurna, Nepal. French route, solo without supplementary oxygen. Summit.

== Death on Annapurna ==
According to Dreamers Destination, a Nepalese operator he was using for his base camp services, Mansikka reached the summit of Annapurna at 2:45pm on 24 March 2015, along with six Sherpas and six paying clients from the Dreamers Destination team. What happened next is unclear, but Mansikka and Pemba Sherpa descended ahead of the rest of the group and somehow became separated from them. They were not seen again until their bodies were seen by other team members the following day, at an altitude of around 6,700 metres (21,982 ft). It was apparent they had died from a fall.

Because both climbers fell together, there was speculation they were roped together at the time. However, the Finnish magazine, Retki, later claimed this was not the case. An article a few days after his death stated that Mansikka had urged the other climbers on when they considered turning back short of the summit. It went on to say Mansikka had started his descent alone, but that Pemba Sherpa later caught up with him.

On 28 March Mansikka's friend and climbing partner Phil Crampton organised a mission to try and recover the bodies using helicopter and longline technique, but this was aborted when it was felt the lives of the rescuers were being put in too much danger. Both bodies remain on the mountain where they fell.
