= Annapurna =

10th-highest mountain on Earth

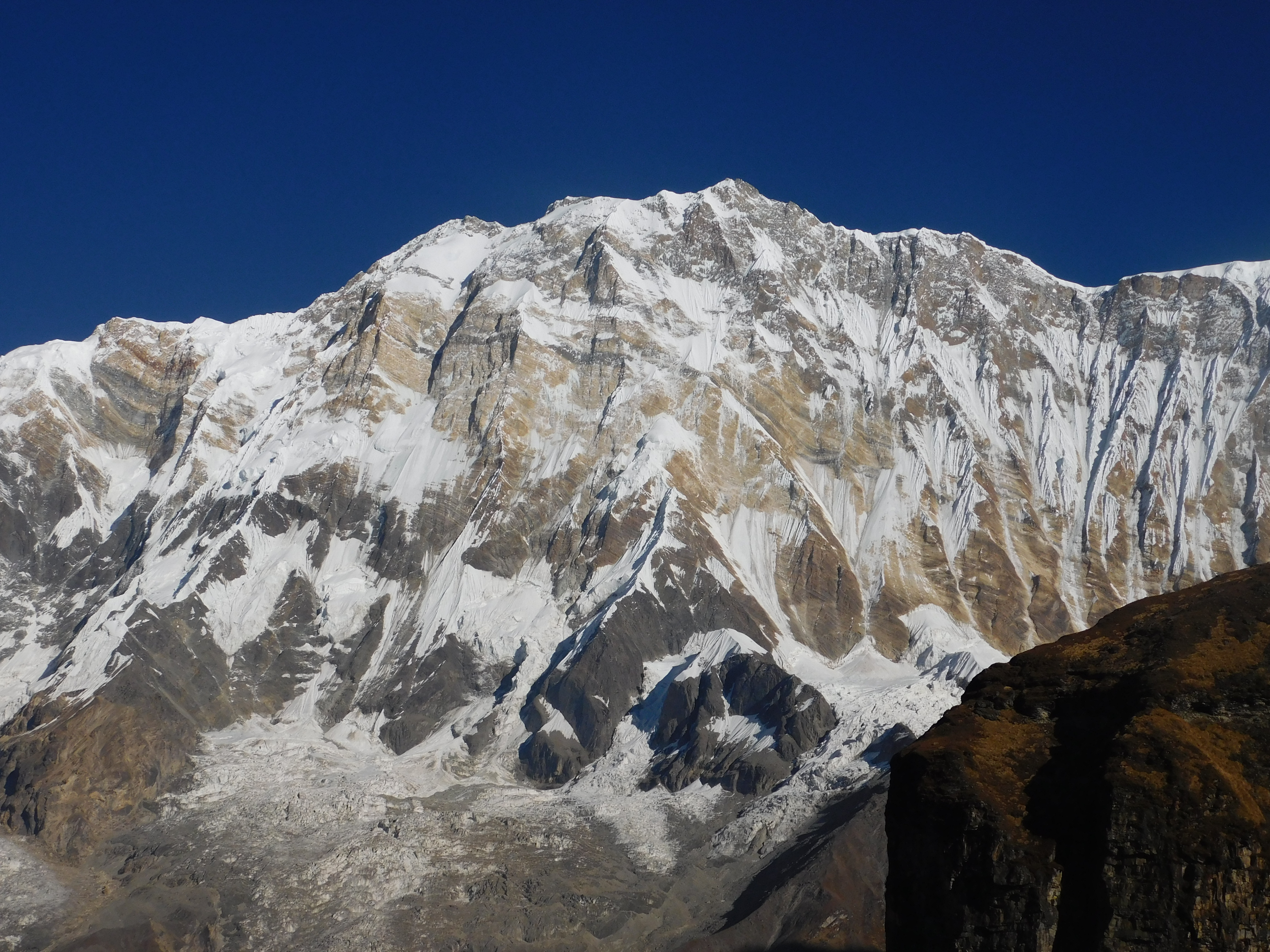
- South face of Annapurna I (Main)

Highest point
- Elevation: 8,091 m (26,545 ft); Ranked 10th
- Prominence: 2,984 m (9,790 ft); Ranked 94th
- Parent peak: Cho Oyu
- Listing: Eight-thousander; Ultra
- Coordinates: 28°35′46″N 83°49′13″E

Geography
- The major peaks (not mountains) above 7,500 m (24,600 ft) height in Himalayas, rank identified in Himalayas alone (not the world). Legend: 1：Mount Everest; 2：Kangchenjunga; 3：Lhotse; 4：Yalung Kang, Kanchenjunga West; 5：Makalu; 6：Kangchenjunga South; 7：Kangchenjunga Central; 8：Cho Oyu; 9：Dhaulagiri; 10：Manaslu (Kutang); 11：Nanga Parbat (Diamer); 12：Annapurna; 13：Shishapangma (Shishasbangma, Xixiabangma); 14：Manaslu East; 15：Annapurna East Peak; 16： Gyachung Kang; 17：Annapurna II; 18：Tenzing Peak (Ngojumba Kang, Ngozumpa Kang, Ngojumba Ri); 19：Kangbachen; 20：Himalchuli (Himal Chuli); 21：Ngadi Chuli (Peak 29, Dakura, Dakum, Dunapurna); 22：Nuptse (Nubtse); 23：Nanda Devi; 24：Chomo Lonzo (Chomolonzo, Chomolönzo, Chomo Lönzo, Jomolönzo, Lhamalangcho); 25：Namcha Barwa (Namchabarwa); 26：Zemu Kang (Zemu Gap Peak); 27：Kamet; 28：Dhaulagiri II; 29：Ngojumba Kang II; 30：Dhaulagiri III; 31：Kumbhakarna Mountain (Mount Kumbhakarna, Jannu); 32：Gurla Mandhata (Naimona'nyi, Namu Nan); 33：Hillary Peak (Ngojumba Kang III); 34：Molamenqing (Phola Gangchen); 35：Dhaulagiri IV; 36：Annapurna Fang; 37：Silver Crag; 38：Kangbachen Southwest; 39：Gangkhar Puensum (Gangkar Punsum); 40：Annapurna III; 41：Himalchuli West; 42：Annapurna IV; 43：Kula Kangri; 44：Liankang Kangri (Gangkhar Puensum North, Liangkang Kangri); 45：Ngadi Chuli South
- Location: Gandaki Province, Nepal
- Parent range: Annapurna

Climbing
- First ascent: 3 June 1950; Maurice Herzog and Louis Lachenal (First winter ascent 3 February 1987 Jerzy Kukuczka and Artur Hajzer)
- Easiest route: northeast face

Annapurna (/ˌænəˈpʊərnəˌ -ˈpɜːr-/; Nepali: अन्नपूर्ण) is a mountain situated in the Annapurna mountain range of Gandaki Province, north-central Nepal. It is the 10th highest mountain in the world at 8,091 metres (26,545 ft) above sea level and is well known for the difficulty and danger involved in its ascent.

Maurice Herzog led a French expedition to its summit through the north face in 1950, making it the first eight-thousander to be successfully climbed. The entire massif and surrounding area are protected within the 7,629-square-kilometre (2,946 mi^{2}) Annapurna Conservation Area, the first and largest conservation area in Nepal. The Annapurna Conservation Area is home to several world-class treks, including Annapurna Sanctuary and Annapurna Circuit.

For decades, Annapurna I held the highest fatality-to-summit rate of all principal eight-thousander summits. It has, however, seen great climbing successes in recent years. As of February 2025, its fatality rate was 13.42% (75 deaths from 559 ascents), according to Guinness World Records. The mountain still poses grave threats to climbers through avalanche danger, unpredictable weather and the extremely steep and committing nature of its climbing routes, in particular its 3,000-metre (9,800 ft) south face, renowned as one of the most difficult climbs in the world. It is also a dangerous peak for trekkers, as in the case of a 2014 snowstorm near it and Dhaulagiri which killed at least 43 people.

== Etymology ==
The mountain is named after Annapurna, the Hindu goddess of food and nourishment, who is said to reside there. The name Annapurna is derived from the Sanskrit-language words purna ("filled") and anna ("food"), and can be translated as "everlasting food". Many streams descending from the slopes of the Annapurna Massif provide water for the agricultural fields and pastures located at lower elevations.

== Geology ==
Annapurna Mountain consists of a few-kilometre-thick stack of early Paleozoic sedimentary and metasedimentary rocks of the Tethyan Himalayan Sequence that steeply dips northward. From top to bottom these sedimentary rocks consist of Ordovician limestone, dolomite, calc-schist, shale, and sandstone of the Nilgiri Formation; Cambrian psammite, marble, and sandstone of the Annapurna Yellow Formation; and Cambrian pelitic and the highly deformed, semipelitic schists of the Sanctuary Formation. These northerly tilted (dipping) layers of sedimentary rocks are the northern limb of the overturned Nilgiri Anticline. The summit of Annapurna consists of the Nilgiri Formation.

Tethyan Himalayan Sequence consists of a 11-kilometre (6.8 mi) thick pile of Neoproterozoic to Mesozoic sedimentary rocks that accumulated within a prehistoric continental shelf. This continental shelf was located along the northern shore of the Indian subcontinent and submerged beneath southern margin of the prehistoric Tethys Ocean prior its collision with Asia. The collision of India and Asia during the Himalayan orogeny incorporated this continental shelf into the Himalayan Mountains as a thin, fault-bounded tectonic package of rocks that outcrops continuously for more than 2,000-kilometre (1,200 mi) along the length of the Himalayan Mountains.

== Climbing history ==
=== Climbing expeditions ===
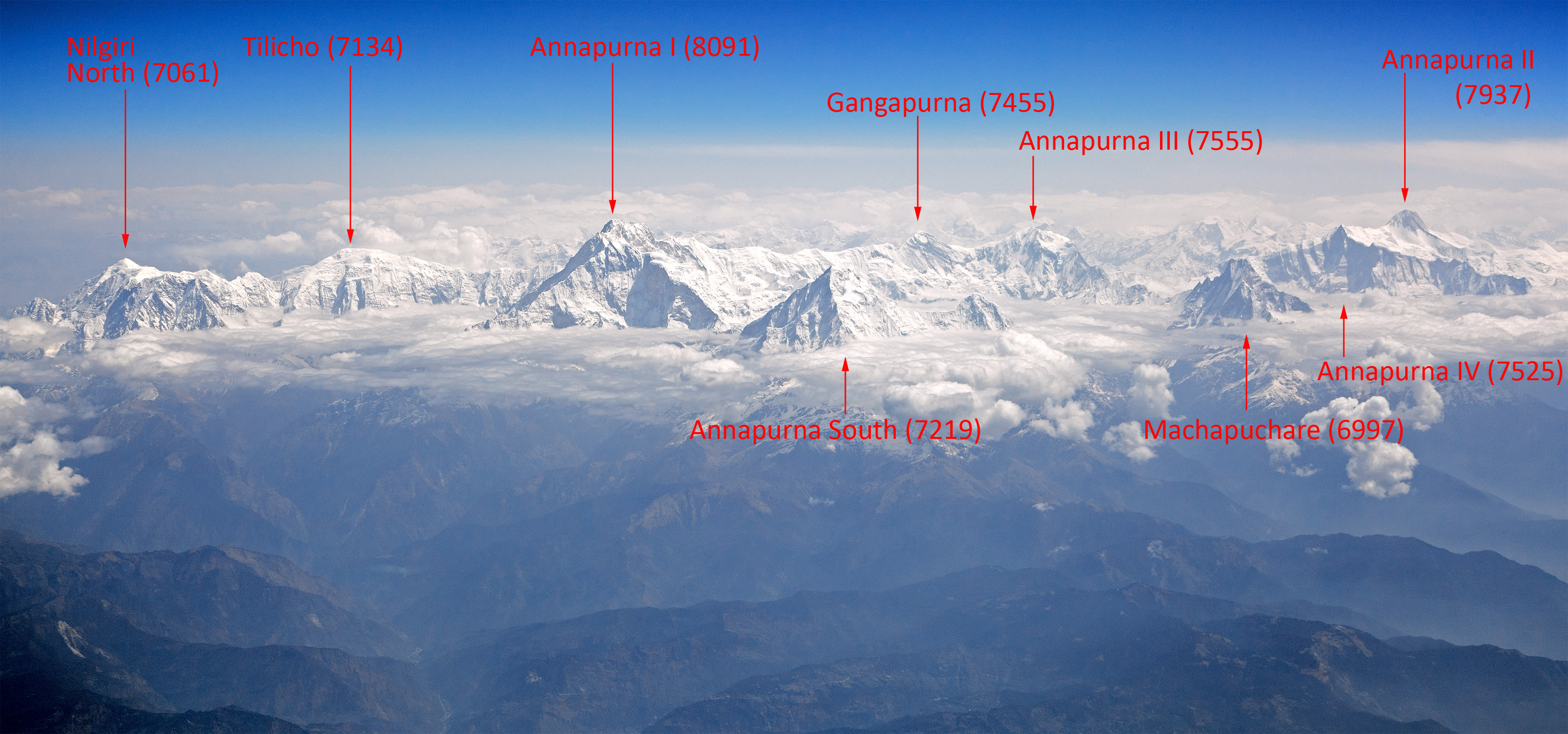
The Annapurna massif, view from aircraft

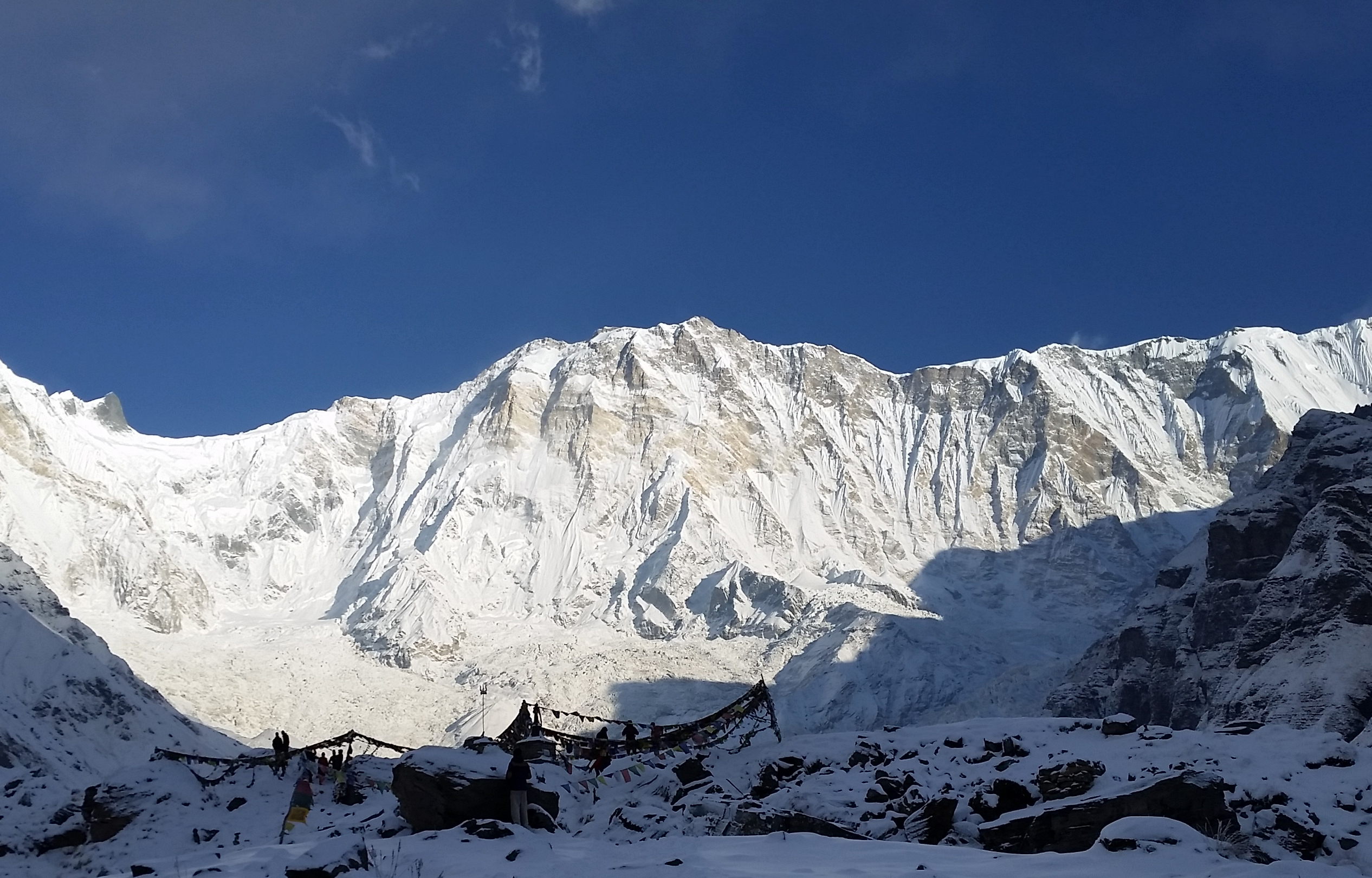
The south face of Annapurna I

Annapurna I was the first 8,000-metre (26,200 ft) peak to be climbed. Maurice Herzog and Louis Lachenal, of the French Annapurna expedition led by Herzog (including Lionel Terray, Gaston Rébuffat, Marcel Ichac, Jean Couzy, Marcel Schatz, Jacques Oudot, Francis de Noyelle), reached the summit on 3 June 1950. Ichac made a documentary of the expedition, called Victoire sur l'Annapurna. Its summit was the highest one ever attained at the time, but not the highest climb; higher non-summit points – at least 8,500 metres (27,900 ft) – had already been attained on Mount Everest in the 1920s.

The south face of Annapurna was first climbed in 1970 by Don Whillans and Dougal Haston also without using supplementary oxygen, members of a British expedition led by Chris Bonington that included Ian Clough, who was killed by a falling serac during the descent. They were, however, beaten to the second ascent of Annapurna by a matter of days by a British Army expedition whose climbing team was led by then-Captain Henry Day.

In 1978, the American Women's Himalayan Expedition, a team led by Arlene Blum, became the first United States team to climb Annapurna I. The first summit team, composed of Vera Komarkova and Irene Miller, and Sherpas Mingma Tsering and Chewang Ringjing, reached the top at 3:30 pm on 15 October 1978. Komarkova and Miller were the first women ever to reach the summit of the mountain. The second summit team, Alison Chadwick-Onyszkiewicz and Vera Watson, died during this climb.

In 1981 Polish expedition Zakopane Alpine Club set a new route on Annapurna I Central (8051 m). Maciej Berbeka and Bogusław Probulski reached the summit on 23 May 1981. The route called Zakopiańczyków Way was recognized as the best achievement of the Himalayan season in 1981.

On 3 February 1987, Polish climbers Jerzy Kukuczka and Artur Hajzer made the first winter ascent of Annapurna I.

The first solo ascent of the south face was made in October 2007 by Slovenian climber Tomaž Humar; he climbed to Roc Noir and then to Annapurna East (8,047m).

Swiss climber Ueli Steck claimed to have soloed the Lafaille route, on the main and highest part of the face, on 8 and 9 October 2013. This was his third attempt on the route and has been called "one of the most impressive Himalayan climbs in history", with Steck taking 28 hours to make the trip from Base Camp to summit and back again. There are significant doubts about this claim.

=== Fatality rate ===
Along with K2 and Nanga Parbat, Annapurna I has consistently ranked as one of the most dangerous of the principal eight-thousander summits. Climbers killed on the peak include Britons Ian Clough in 1970, and Alex MacIntyre in 1982, Frenchman Pierre Béghin in 1992, Kazakh Anatoli Boukreev in 1997, Spaniard Iñaki Ochoa in 2008, Korean Park Young-seok in 2011 and Finn Samuli Mansikka in 2015.

== Flights ==
Several airlines offer sightseeing flights over Annapurna.

== See also ==
- Dhaulagiri
- Manaslu
- Tilicho Lake
- List of deaths on Annapurna
- List of ultras of the Himalayas

== Bibliography ==
- Blum, Arlene (1980). Annapurna: A Woman's Place. San Francisco, CA: Sierra Club Books. ISBN 0-87156-236-7.
- Herzog, Maurice (1951). Annapurna: First Conquest of an 8000-meter Peak. Translated by Nea Morin; Janet Adam Smith. New York: E.P. Dutton & Co.
