= Mięguszowiecki Summits =

Group of three major summits in the main ridge of the Tatra Mountains

- Mięguszowieckie Szczyty; Mengusovské štíty
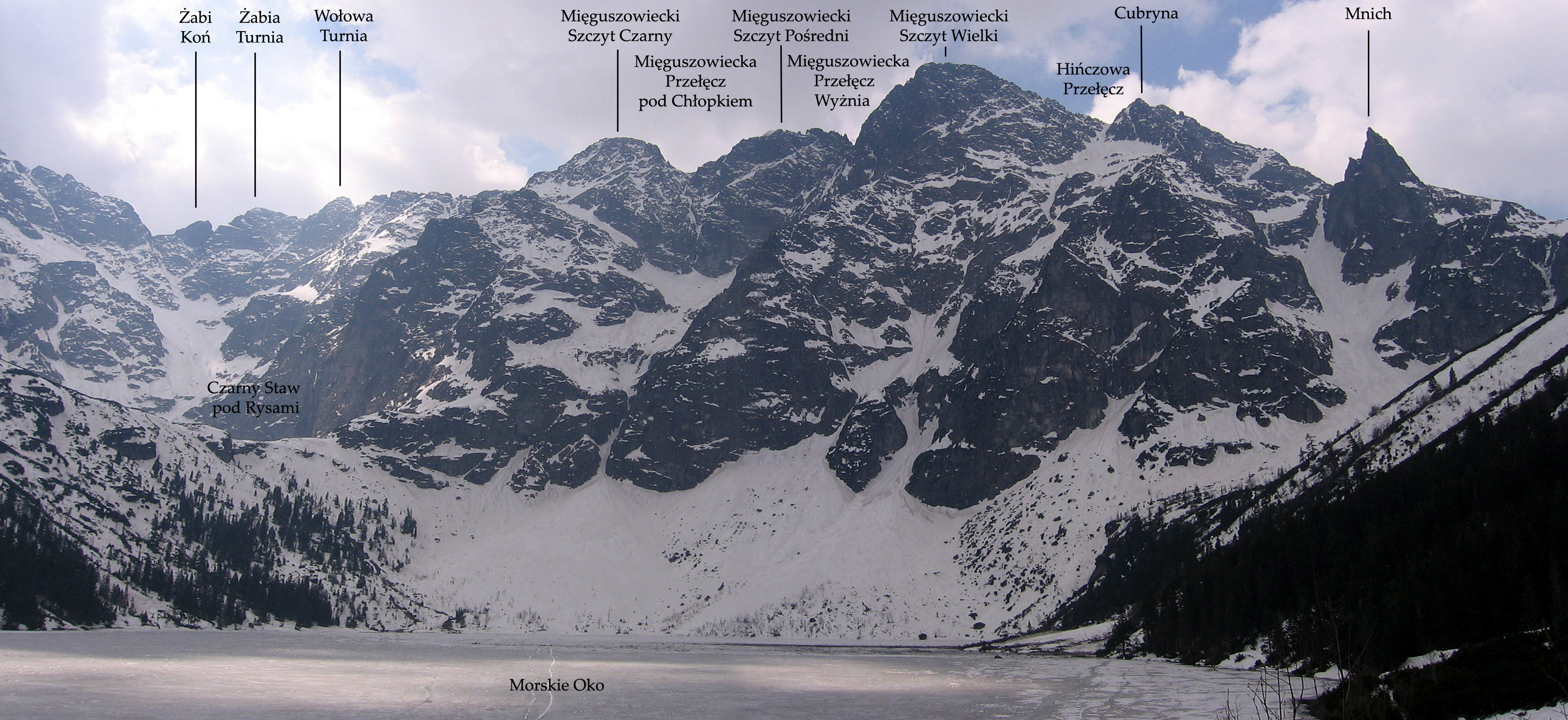
- Summits around the Morskie Oko Lake

Highest point
- Peak: Mięguszowiecki Grand Peak
- Elevation: 2,438 m (7,999 ft)
- Coordinates: 49°11′14″N 20°03′36″E

Geography
- Countries: Poland and Slovakia
- Regions: Lesser Poland and Prešov
- Parent range: High Tatras, Tatra Mountains

Mięguszowiecki Summits (Polish: Mięguszowieckie Szczyty, Slovak: Mengusovské štíty) are a group of three summits in the main ridge of the Tatra Mountains on the border between Poland and Slovakia.

The highest one is the Mięguszowiecki Grand Peak (2,438m, second highest in Poland, fifteenth in Tatra Mountains). To the east of it there is Mięguszowiecki Middle Peak (2393 m) and the Mięguszowiecki Black Peak (2410 m) further eastwards.
