= Irene Beardsley =

American mountaineer (born 1935)

Personal information
- Nationality: American
- Born: Irene Adelaide Beardsley; August 18, 1935
- Education: Stanford University

Climbing career
- Type of climber: Mountaineering
- Named routes: Irene's Arete
- Known for: First female ascent of Annapurna

Irene Beardsley (formerly Ortenburger and Miller; born 1935) is an American mountaineer and physicist. She and Vera Komarkova were the first women to climb Annapurna, the tenth-highest mountain in the world, as part of a majority-female expedition.

== Early life and education ==
Beardsley was born on August 18, 1935, in America, and was inspired to climb mountains after seeing the Teton Range during a family holiday as a child.

Beardsley began climbing in 1953 after joining the Stanford Alpine Club. She describes herself as not a natural athlete, but nonetheless a keen climber who went on trips around Yosemite and the Tetons. She majored in physics, graduating in 1957, following it up with a masters in 1958.

In 1965, Beardsley earned her PhD, and she was the fourth woman to graduate with a physics PhD from Stanford.

== Climbing ==
Beardsley climbed extensively in the Tetons and Peru, including making the first ascent (1957) of Irene's Arete, Disappointment Peak, in Grand Teton National Park.

She travelled to Nepal in 1961 with her husband, as he was invited to be a part of Edmund Hillary's Makalu expedition. Once she arrived she was forbidden by Hillary to set foot on the mountain, despite her climbing credentials. In 1965, along with Sue Swedlund, she made the first all-female ascent of the North Face of the Grand Teton.

She worked as a guide for Exum Mountain Guides in 1963, the first woman to do so, despite the owner, Glenn Exum, being "old-fashioned" and against using female guides.

While working as a physicist at IBM, she was invited to be part of the 1978 American Women's Himalayan Expedition to Annapurna, which aimed to be the first American Annapurna expedition, and first female only expedition. At the time women were often rejected from major expeditions, and the all-female nature of this one was a rare opportunity to both climb a major mountain, and demonstrate that women were capable of doing do. They raised money for the expedition by selling T-shirts with the slogan A Woman's Place is on Top. Although they had originally planned to train Nepali Sherpa women as porters, eventually hired experienced Sherpa men. After a month of climbing Beardsley and Komarkova became the first women to climb Annapurna.

== Personal life ==
Beardsley married fellow climber Leigh Ortenburger in 1956, who she met at Standford. They had two children, Carolyn (1962) and Teresa (1966). She later married Colin Miller.

== Notable climbs ==
- Mount Moran (1963); assorted first ascents in the area
- Palcaraju (1964); second ascent
- North Face of the Grand Teton (1965); first all-female ascent
- Annapurna (1978); first American ascent; first female ascent

== See also ==
- Arlene Blum
- American Women's Himalayan Expedition
