= Annapurna I Middle Peak =

Subsidiary peak of Annapurna I

Annapurna I Central
- Annapurna Middle
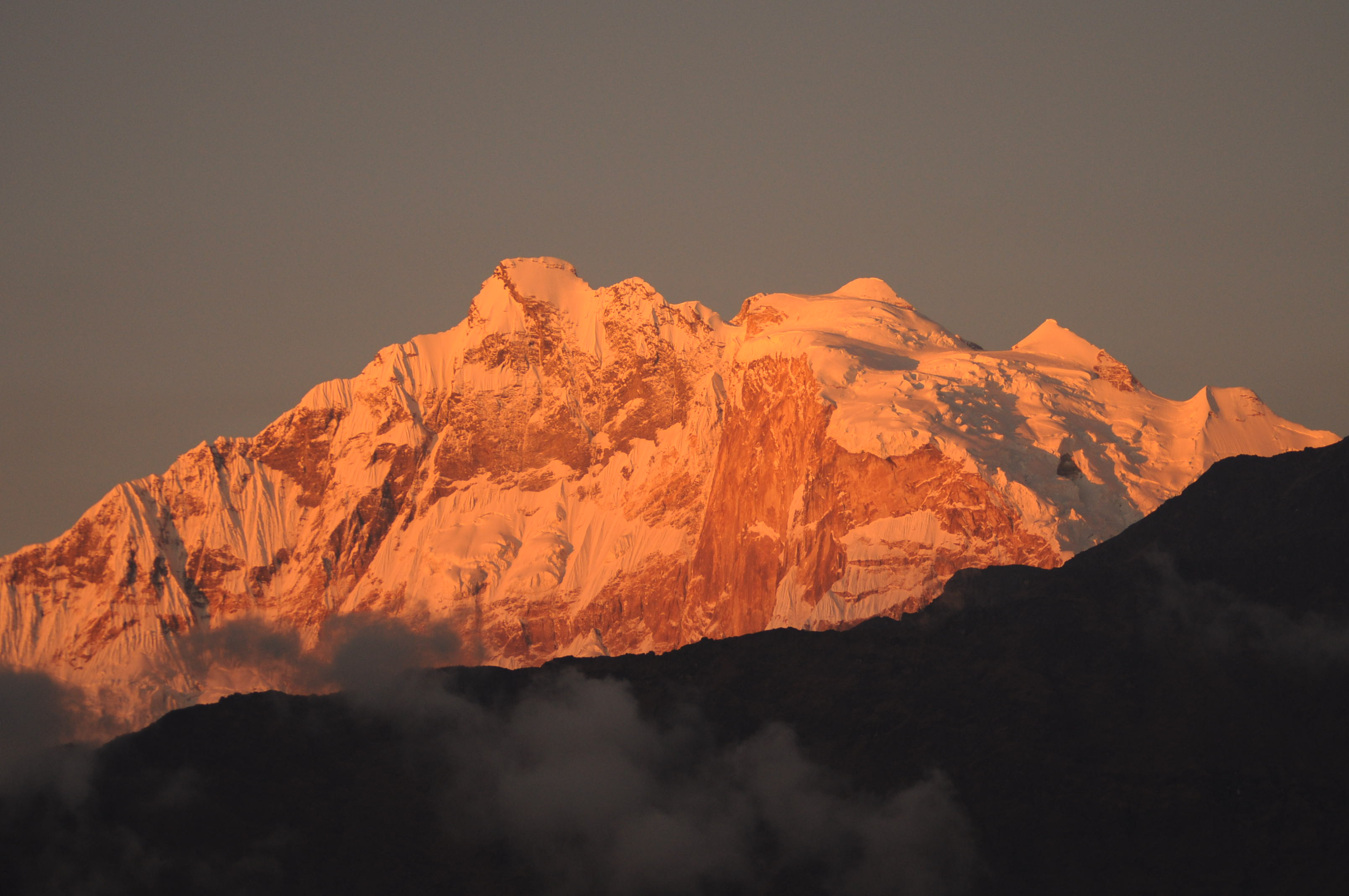
- Annapurna I Central is the slightly lower peak just to the right of Annapurna I Main in this image.

Highest point
- Elevation: 8,013 m (26,289 ft)
- Prominence: 49 m (161 ft)
- Parent peak: Annapurna I Main
- Isolation: 0.75 km (0.47 mi)
- Listing: Mountains of Nepal
- Coordinates: 28°36′N 83°50′E

Geography
- Location within Nepal
- Location: Gandaki Province, Nepal
- Parent range: Annapurna Himal, Himalayas

Climbing
- First ascent: 1980
- Easiest route: snow/ice climb

Annapurna I Central is a subsidiary peak of Annapurna I Main located in Nepal. It is located about 0.75 km (½ mile) west of the main summit and has a height of 8,013 m (26,289 ft) and a prominence height of 49 m (161 ft).
