= Dhaulagiri (mountain range) =

Mountain range in Nepal

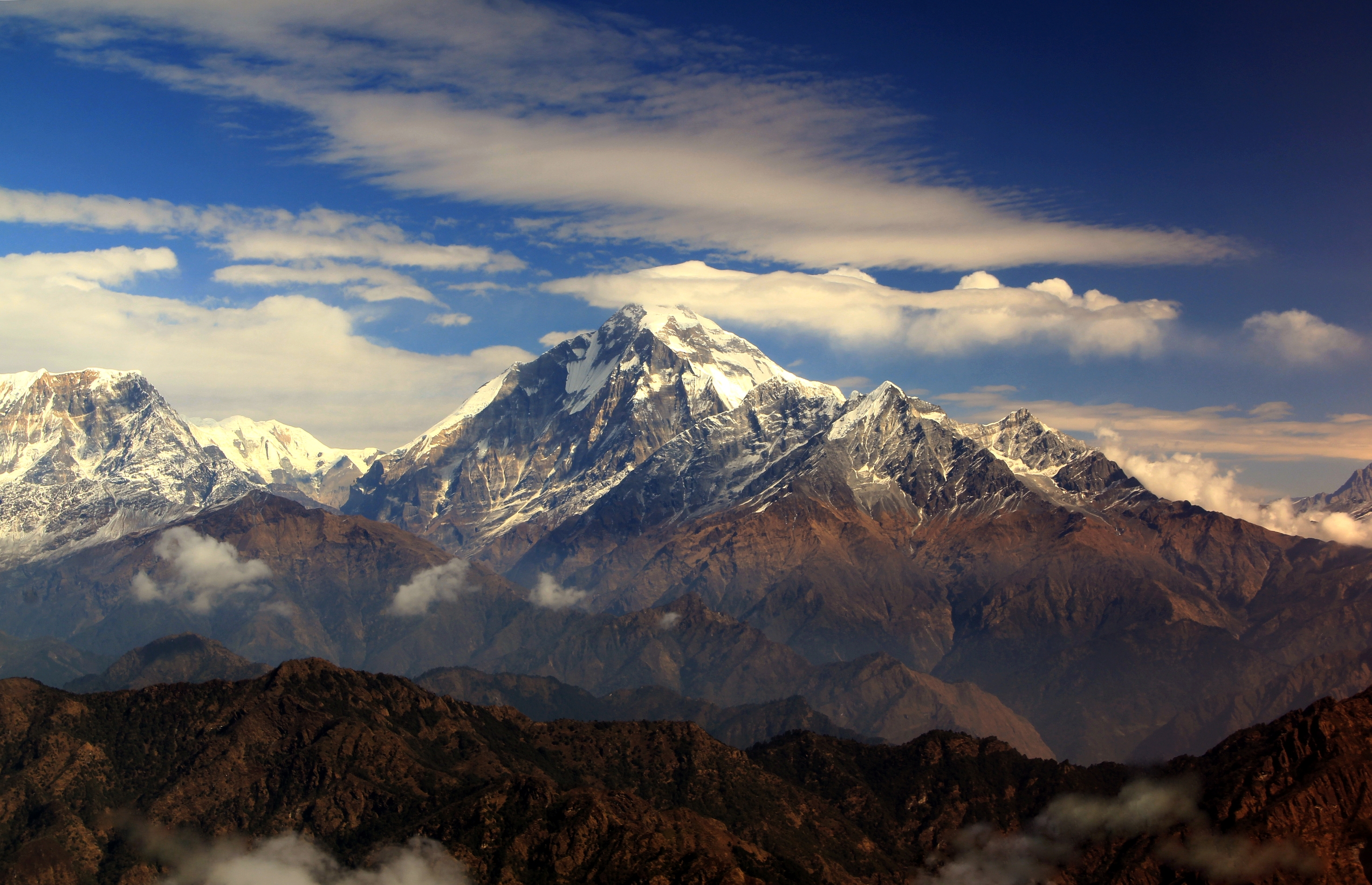

Highest point
- Peak: Dhaulagiri
- Elevation: 8,167 m (26,795 ft)

Dimensions
- Length: 50 km (31 mi)
- Width: 15 km (9.3 mi)

Geography
- The major peaks (not mountains) above 7,500 m (24,600 ft) height in Himalayas, rank identified in Himalayas alone (not the world). Legend: 1：Mount Everest; 2：Kangchenjunga; 3：Lhotse; 4：Yalung Kang, Kanchenjunga West; 5：Makalu; 6：Kangchenjunga South; 7：Kangchenjunga Central; 8：Cho Oyu; 9：Dhaulagiri; 10：Manaslu (Kutang); 11：Nanga Parbat (Diamer); 12：Annapurna; 13：Shishapangma (Shishasbangma, Xixiabangma); 14：Manaslu East; 15：Annapurna East Peak; 16： Gyachung Kang; 17：Annapurna II; 18：Tenzing Peak (Ngojumba Kang, Ngozumpa Kang, Ngojumba Ri); 19：Kangbachen; 20：Himalchuli (Himal Chuli); 21：Ngadi Chuli (Peak 29, Dakura, Dakum, Dunapurna); 22：Nuptse (Nubtse); 23：Nanda Devi; 24：Chomo Lonzo (Chomolonzo, Chomolönzo, Chomo Lönzo, Jomolönzo, Lhamalangcho); 25：Namcha Barwa (Namchabarwa); 26：Zemu Kang (Zemu Gap Peak); 27：Kamet; 28：Dhaulagiri II; 29：Ngojumba Kang II; 30：Dhaulagiri III; 31：Kumbhakarna Mountain (Mount Kumbhakarna, Jannu); 32：Gurla Mandhata (Naimona'nyi, Namu Nan); 33：Hillary Peak (Ngojumba Kang III); 34：Molamenqing (Phola Gangchen); 35：Dhaulagiri IV; 36：Annapurna Fang; 37：Silver Crag; 38：Kangbachen Southwest; 39：Gangkhar Puensum (Gangkar Punsum); 40：Annapurna III; 41：Himalchuli West; 42：Annapurna IV; 43：Kula Kangri; 44：Liankang Kangri (Gangkhar Puensum North, Liangkang Kangri); 45：Ngadi Chuli South
- Country: Nepal
- Province: Gandaki Province

The Dhaulagiri massif in Nepal extends 120 km (70 mi) from the Kaligandaki River west to the Bheri. This massif is bounded on the north and southwest by tributaries of the Bheri River and on the southeast by the Myagdi Khola. The range lies 40 miles (65 km) northwest of Annapurna and is located in Myagdi District of Nepal.

== Toponymy ==
Dhaulagiri (धौलागिरी) is the Nepali name for the mountain which comes from Sanskrit where धवल (dhawala) means dazzling, white, beautiful and गिरि (giri) means mountain.

== Geography ==
Despite deriving its name from Dhaulagiri I, which stands alone immediately due east of 5,355m French Pass, the rest of the Dhaulagiri Himal is a fully independent massif in its own right. The next-highest summit, Dhaulagiri II, is the 30th-highest mountain on Earth. Most of the named 7,000-metre peaks are on a ridge extending WNW. In order they are Dhaulagiris II, III, V, IV, Junction Peak, Churens East, Central and West, Putha Hiunchuli, and Hiunchuli Patan. False Junction Peak, Dhaulagiri VI and Gurja are on a ridge extending south from Junction Peak. The British Alpine Club's Himalayan Index lists 37 more peaks over 6,000 m.

6,182m Pota Himal (FinnMap sheet 2883-01 "Chhedhul Gumba") stands north of the main ridge between Churen and Putha Hiunchuli. Pota has been informally renamed Peak Hawley after Elizabeth Hawley, a notable expedition chronicler and Kathmandu-based reporter.

Hiunchuli Patan at the western end nearest the Bheri River is locally called Sisne or Murkatta Himal. It was an iconic landmark to insurgents based in Rukum and Rolpa districts during the 1996–2006 Nepal Civil War.

== Peaks ==
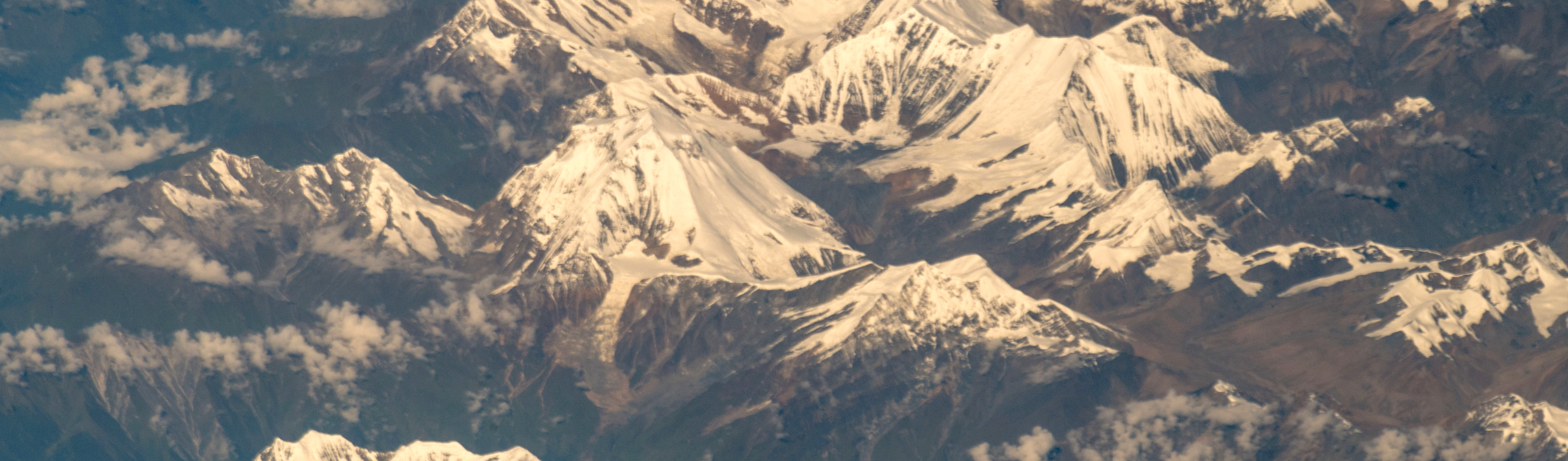
mountains Jirbang, Manapati, Dhaulagiri I, Tukuche Peak and Dhaulagiri II

Mountain	Height (m)	Height (ft)	Coordinates	Prominence (m)	First ascent
Dhaulagiri I	8,167	26,795	28°41′54″N 83°29′15″E	3,357	1960
Dhaulagiri II	7,751	25,430	28°45′50″N 83°23′15″E	2,391	1971
Dhaulagiri III	7,715	25,311	28°45′17″N 83°22′37″E	135	1973
Dhaulagiri IV	7,661	25,135	28°44′12″N 83°18′52″E	469	1969
Dhaulagiri V	7,618	24,992	28°44′05″N 83°21′41″E	340	1975
Churen Himal	7,385	24,229	28°44′06″N 83°12′58″E	600	1970
Churen Himal (East)	7,371	24,183	28°44′33″N 83°13′51″E	150	1970
Churen Himal (West)	7,371	24,183	28°43′55″N 83°12′45″E	70	1970
Dhaulagiri VI	7,268	23,845	28°42′30″N 83°16′32″E	453	1970
Putha Hiunchuli (Dh VII)	7,246	23,773	28°44′50″N 83°08′55″E	1,151	1954
Gurja Himal	7,193	23,599	28°40′26″N 83°16′37″E	500	1969
False Junction Peak	7,150	23,458	28°43′00″N 83°16′38″E	400	1970
Junction Peak	7,108	23,320	28°43′19″N 83°16′38″E	20	1972
Peak Hawley	6,182	20,282	28°46′33″N 83°11′45″E	350	2008
Hiunchuli Patan	5,911	19,185	28°49′39″N 82°37′1″E	1310	2013

† Only peaks above 7,200 m with more than 500 m (1,640.4 ft) of topographic prominence are ranked.

‡ The status of Churen Himal's three peaks is unclear and sources differ on their heights. The coordinates, heights and prominence values above are derived from the Finnmap. The first ascent data is from Neate, but it is unclear if the first ascent of Churen Himal East was actually an ascent of the highest of the three peaks, as Neate lists Churen Himal Central as a 7,320 m subpeak of Churen Himal East.

== Climbing history ==
- 1954 – J. O. M. Roberts and Ang Nyima Sherpa climb Putha Hiunchuli, the first major summit ascent in the range.
- 1955 – Dh.II attempted by J. O. M. Roberts and others
- 1959
1. Pre-monsoon and post-monsoon reconnaissances of Dh.II by Japanese expeditions.
2. Hangde 6556m in Mukut section attempted.
- 1962
1. Churen attempt from north by Japanese Nihon University expedition. Climbed Hangde (~6600m), Tongu (~6250m), P6265 during approach/acclimation through Hidden Valley; also Kantokal (~6500m) north of Putha Hiunchili.
2. Churen and Dh.VI attempt from south by J. O. M. Roberts, thinking he was on Dh.IV due to inaccurate maps. Climbed a lower peak (6,529m) near Gurja, naming it Ghustang after the stream draining the cirque they climbed in.
- 1963
1. Dh.II attempt by Austrian expedition, reaching 7,000m
2. Dh.III attempt
- 1965
1. Japanese expedition to Dh.II delayed two months by heavy snow in approach passes. Lost two porters to avalanche, then another porter was injured in a fall and needed evacuation. This left too little food to continue.
2. J. O. M. Roberts leads British R.A.F. expedition to Dh.VI, still believing it was Dh.IV. Defeated by late monsoon, then early winter storms creating excessive avalanche risk.
- 1969
1. Dh.IV attempt by Austrian Alpine Club. Five Austrians and one Nepali disappear, may have summited.
2. Gurja climbed by Japanese expedition.
3. First authorized ascents of Tukuche 6920m and Tukuche West 6800m.
- 1970
1. Japan's Kansai Mountaineering Club unsuccessful on Dh.IV in April but climbed Dh.VI and False Junction Peak.
2. Korean expedition claims they summited Churen East on 29 April. Questioned by same year Japanese expedition, see next.
3. Japanese expedition climbs Churen Central and Churen West on 24 October.
- 1971
1. First ascent of Dh.II on 18 May by Austrian expedition.
2. Dh.IV attempt
3. Dh.V attempted by pre- and post-monsoon Japanese expeditions. Both ended by fatal accidents.
- 1972 – Dh.IV attempted twice by Japanese expeditions. First attempt abandoned when a climber fell ill and died at 6200m. Second expedition climbed via crest from west, found route too long at high elevation (7,000m+). Climbed Dh.VI and Junction Peak.
- 1973
1. first ascent of Dh.III on 20 October by German expedition.
2. Dh.IV attempted by Austrians who reached 7250m on N face, then by British who quit after two deaths.
- 1974
1. Dh.IV attempt by British R.A.F. expedition abandoned after three Sherpas killed by falling ice.
2. In Mukut section: ascents of Parbat Rinchen 6200m, Parbat Talpari 6248m, West Himparkhal 6248m, East Himparkhal 6227m, Tashi Kang III 6157m (by a German expedition).
- 1975
1. Dh.IV climbed 9 May by S. Kawazu and E. Yusuda, who died on descent, bringing death toll on Dh.IV to 14. (Compared with 13 deaths on Mount Everest before it was successfully climbed in 1953.) Another Japanese expedition in October puts ten on summit without loss of life.
2. Dh.V climbed by M. Morioka and Pembu Tsering Sherpa on Japanese expedition.
- 1979 – Japanese traverse Dh.II, III and V. Expedition led by the Michiko Imai, the only female member of the 20 person team. The traverse involved multiple days above 7,000 metres with a bivouac at 7,550 m (24,770 ft) in the col between Dhaulagiri II and III and another at 7,200 m (23,600 ft) in the col connecting Dhaulagiri III and V.
- 2008 – First ascent of Peak Hawley (AKA Pota Himal; named after Elizabeth Hawley). Solo climb by François Damilano following expedition climb of Putha Hiunchuli.
- 2013 – First ascent of Hiunchuli Patan (known locally as Sisne or Murkatta Himal). Nepalese expedition led by Man Bahadur Khatri.
