= Jhumlawang =

Jhumlabang village (झुम्लावाङ्ग गाउँ) is home to about 1200 inhabitants with major ethnic group being Magar. The village is located in Bhume Rural Municipality Ward No. 3, Eastern Rukum District of Lumbini Province, Nepal. The elevation of Jhumlawang village is about 2328 m (7633 ft.) but varies from 1600m to 3100m.

Although there is not enough written history about the village and its people, but our family roots, and generation to generation passed information tells us that our ancestors were migrated to this village hundreds of years ago from various parts of the present day Nepal.

Hundreds of years ago, this village used to be a centre of business activities in the region due to its copper mining industry. But today, almost all members of the community are depending on agriculture which is based on traditional farming. Recently, going abroad, especially Malaysia and Gulf countries, has become a new trend for village youths, leaving their family behind, for an employment as unskilled labour.
