= Chunwang =

Chunwang may refer to:

- "Chunwang" (poem), an 8th-century poem by Du Fu
- Chunwang (place), a village in Nepal
- Jia Chunwang, Chinese politician (born 1938)
