= Kol, Nepal =

Kol कोल
- Putha Uttarganga Rural Municipality Eastern Rukum
- Location in Nepal
- Coordinates: 28.61°N 82.77°E
- Country: Nepal
- Province: Lumbini Province
- District: Eastern Rukum District

Population (2011)
  - Total: 3,127
- Time zone: UTC+5:45 (Nepal Time)
- Area code: +977-88
- Website: www.ddcrukum.gov.np

Kol is a Putha Uttarganga Rural municipality Ward no.12 in Eastern Rukum District in Lumbini Province of western Nepal. At the time of the 2011 Nepal census it had a population of 3,127 people living in 707 individual households.
