= Putha Uttarganga Rural Municipality =

Rural municipality in Lumbini Province, Nepal

Putha Uttarganga (Nepali: पुथा उत्तरगंगा गाउँपालिका) is a rural municipality located in Eastern Rukum District of Lumbini Province Province of Nepal.

== Demographics ==
At the time of the 2011 Nepal census, Putha Uttarganga Rural Municipality had a population of 17,999. Of these, 45.7% spoke Nepali, 27.1% Magar, 25.8% Kham, 0.6% Gurung, 0.3% Doteli, 0.1% Thakali, 0.1% Bhojpuri and 0.2% other languages as their first language.

In terms of ethnicity/caste, 58.0% were Magar, 24.4% Kami, 6.0% Thakuri, 4.5% Chhetri, 2.5% Damai/Dholi, 1.6% Gurung, 0.6% Chhantyal, 0.5% Hill Brahmin, 0.5% Thakali, 0.3% Badi, 0.3% Kurmi, 0.2% other Dalit, 0.2% Newar, 0.2% Sanyasi/Dasnami, 0.1% other Terai and 0.2% others.

In terms of religion, 82.3% were Hindu, 7.5% Christian, 6.2% Buddhist, 0.3% Prakriti, 0.1% Muslim and 3.6% others.

In terms of literacy, 45.2% could read and write, 3.0% could only read and 51.7% could neither read nor write.
