= Eastern Rukum District =

District in Province No. 5, Nepal

Eastern Rukum District पूर्वी रुकुम
- District
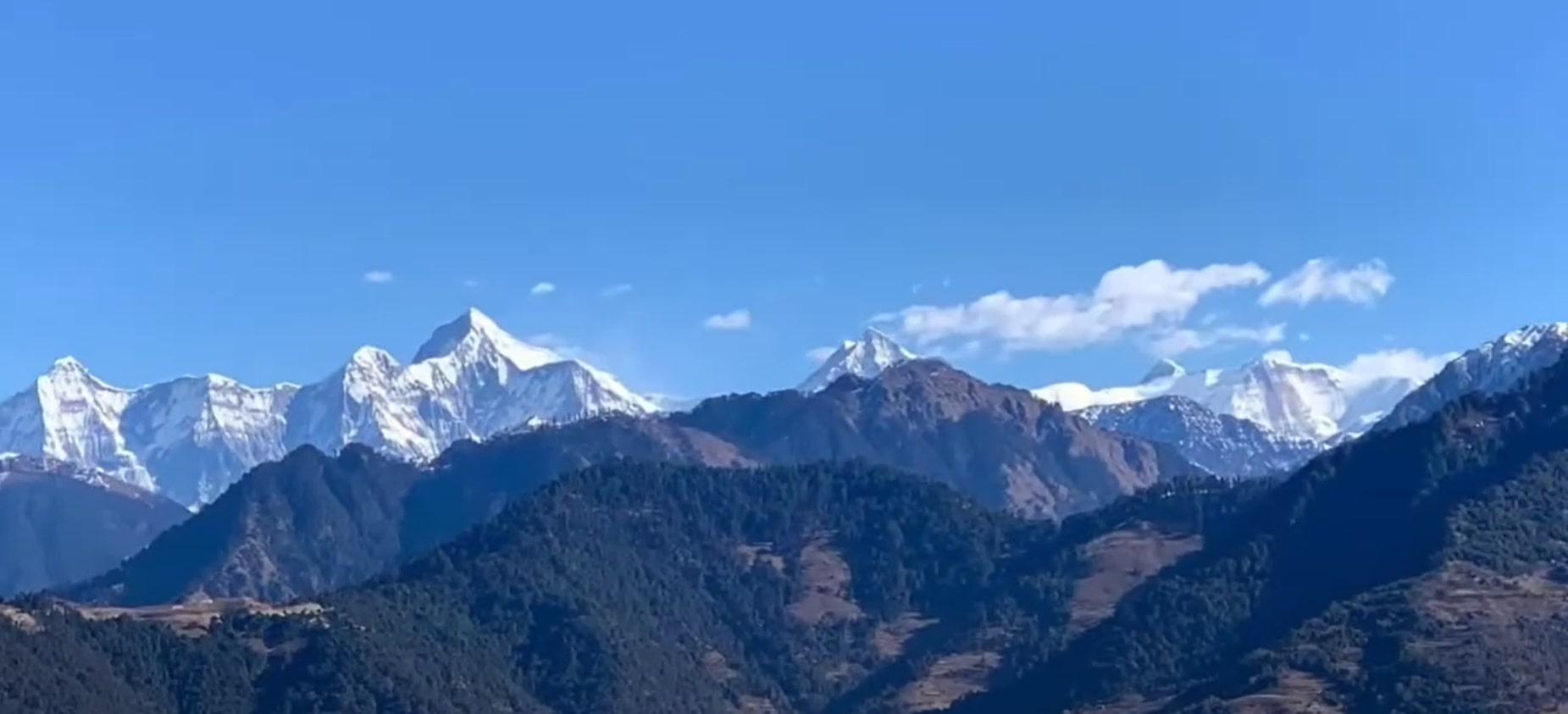
- Dhaulagiri Himalayas in Eastern Rukum

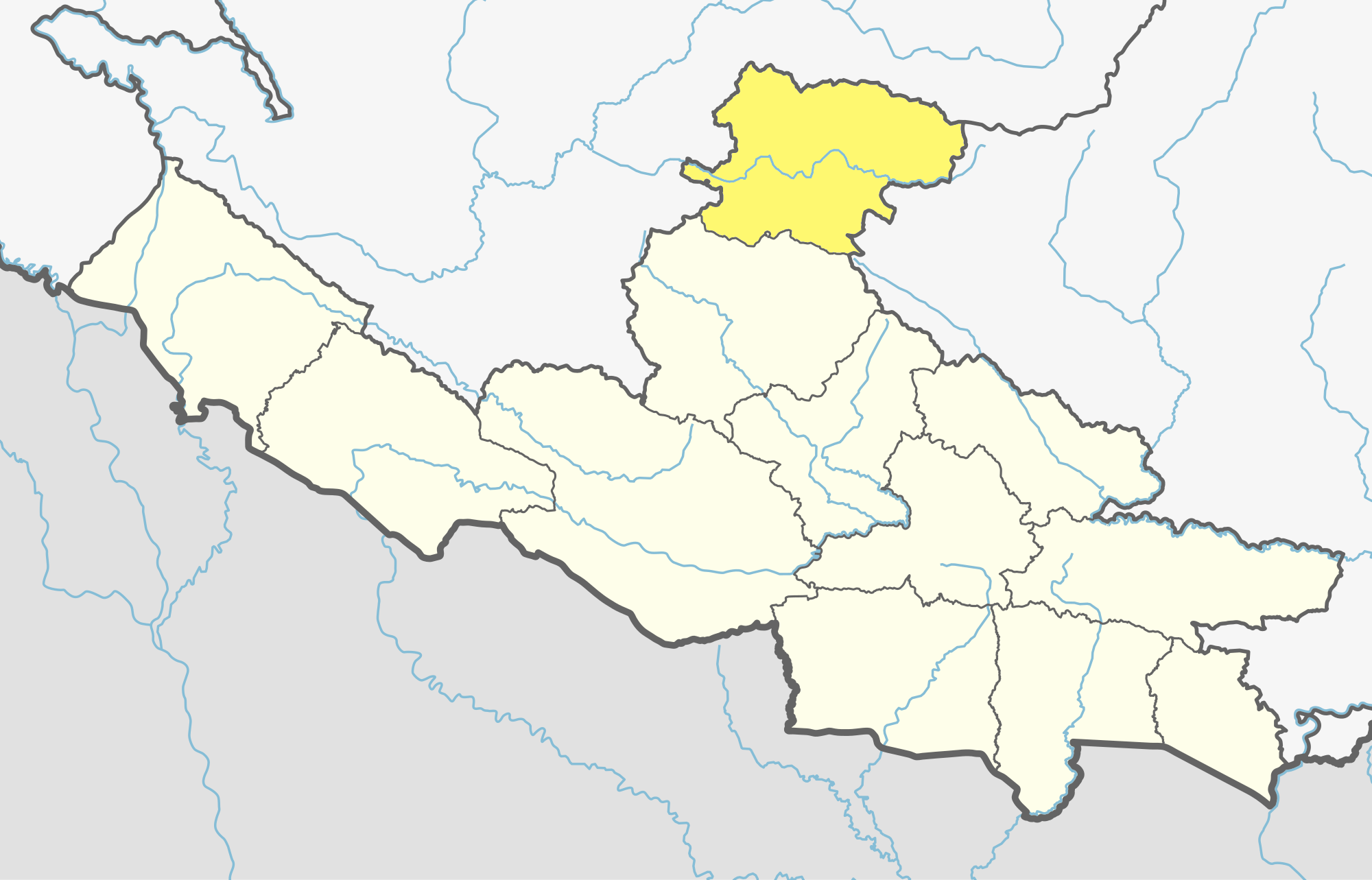
- Location of the district (dark yellow) in Lumbini Province
- Coordinates: 28.37°N 82.37°E
- Country: Nepal
- Province: Lumbini Province
- Established: 2015
- Admin HQ.: Rukumkot

Government
  - Type: Coordination committee
  - Body: DCC, Eastern Rukum

Area
  - Total: 1,161.13 km^{2} (448.31 sq mi)

Population
  - Total: 53,018
  - Density: 45.661/km^{2} (118.26/sq mi)
- Time zone: UTC+05:45 (NPT)
- Website: dccrukumeast.gov.np

Eastern Rukum (Nepali: पूर्वी रुकुम) is a mountain district of Lumbini Province of Nepal situated along the Dhaulagiri mountain range. It is also the only mountain district of the province with its tallest mountain Putha Hiunchuli (Dhaulagiri VII) situated in the west end of Dhaulagiri II mountain chain, at an elevation of 7,246 meters. The drainage source of ancient Airavati river, one of the five sacred rivers of Buddhism, lies in the lesser Himalayas of the district. With a Dhaulagiri mountain range, lakes, Magar culture and its political history, Eastern Rukum has been among the top travel destinations of Nepal as designated by the Government of Nepal.

The district is known for having 52 ponds and 53 hills. From 1996 to 2006, Eastern Rukum - a region with Magar majority - was one of the historical base area of the People's War of Nepal providing many foot soldiers, commanders, prominent leaders and martyrs during the war which in turn pivoted the country into a democratic Federal republic in 2008. Guerilla trekking route has also been developed in the district as an adventure tourism following the past trails of the rebels in the base of Himalayas providing experiences of scenic landscapes, Dhaulagiri mountain ranges and rich Kham Magar culture. In 2018, the district was labelled among the "fully literate" districts of the country, with a literacy rate of over 95%, showing a significant post-conflict development. After Palpa district (53% Magar population), Eastern Rukum has the second largest Magar population in Nepal as a percentage of the total population (51% Magar population).

Though successful in maintaining various levels of autonomy, independence and preservation of Kham Magar culture even during ancient and medieval Nepal, the region's structure were altered during the rule of Rana dynasty as well as during Panchayat era. Before 1975, substantial portion of Eastern Rukum was territorially merged with Palpa district during the Rana regime and with Baglung District during Panchayat. On 20 September 2015, Eastern Rukum was created as a new district after the state's reconstruction of administrative divisions splitting Rukum District into Western Rukum and Eastern Rukum.

== History ==
=== Early history ===
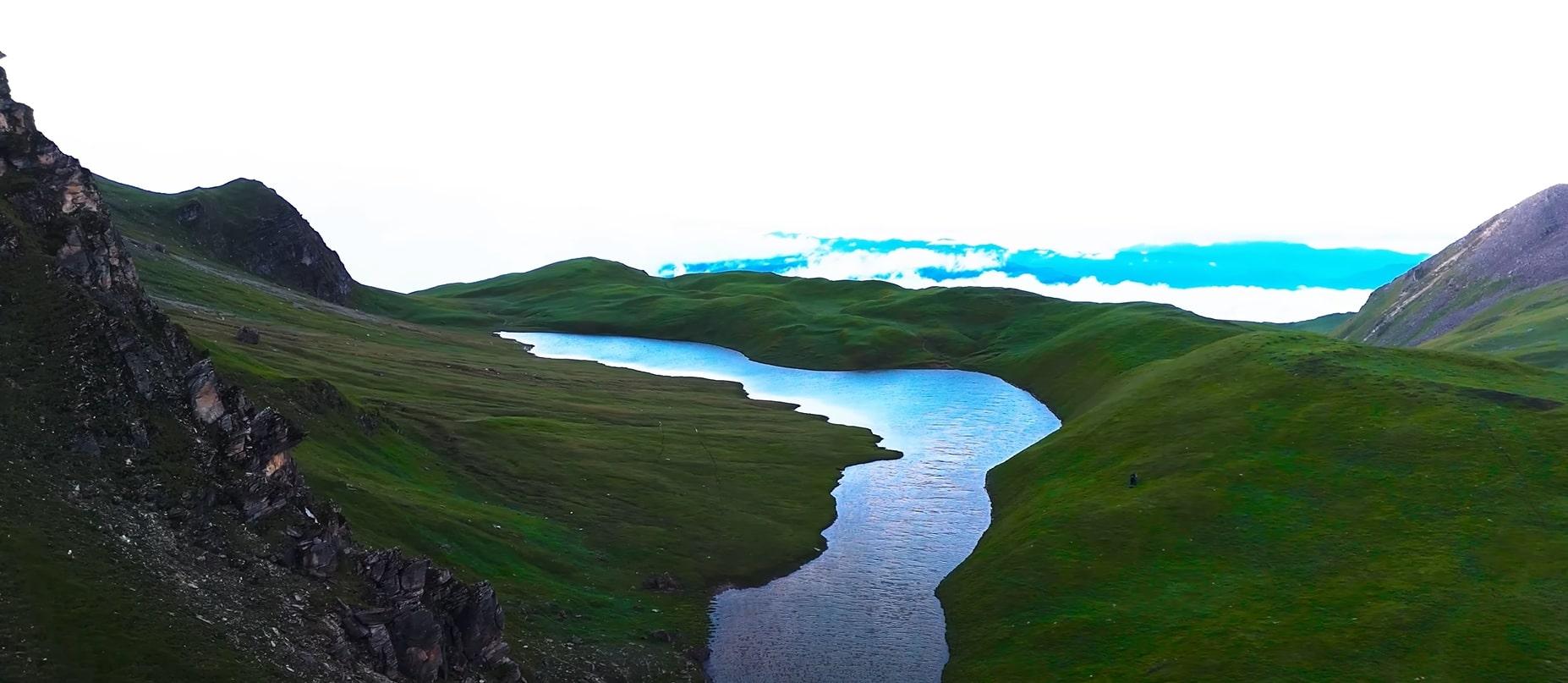
Dhorpatan of Eastern Rukum was a historic migration route of Indo-Aryans and Sino-Tibetans in Nepal

Himalayas has been a melting pot of diverse tribes and cultures since antiquity. The presence of highly-rich majority Magar culture with a complex of Kham Magar language of Sino-Tibetan language family suggests its favorable growth in Eastern Rukum south of Himalayas. In addition to this, being on the northern corridor of the Indian sub-continent, the region was also on the radius of the Indus Valley Civilization and influences of various warring tribes and empires such as Kirata Kingdom, Kushan Empire (Ancient Greek), Gupta Empire, Maurya Empire, Nanda Empire, Karkota Empire, Utpala dynasty, Tibetan Empire and Khasa Kingdom. Therefore, there seems to have formed a synthesis of Hinduism, Shamanism, Masto worship, Bon and Buddhism in the region over a stretch of time. After the initial Muslim conquests spanning out of Arabian lands, western and central Himalayas also served as the refuge and protection to numerous non-Muslims.

=== Medieval History ===
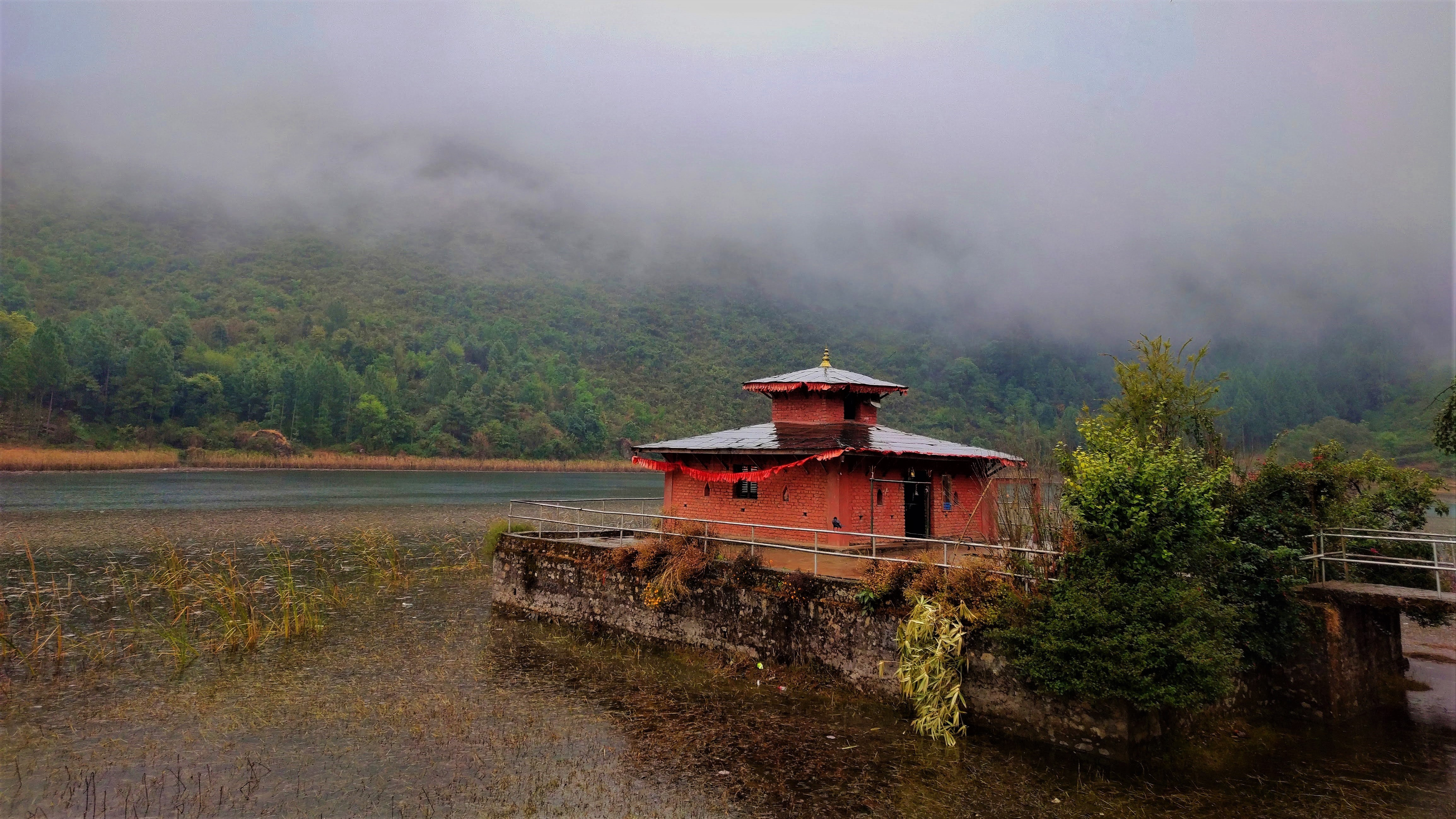
Goddess Bhagavati temple in eastern Rukum

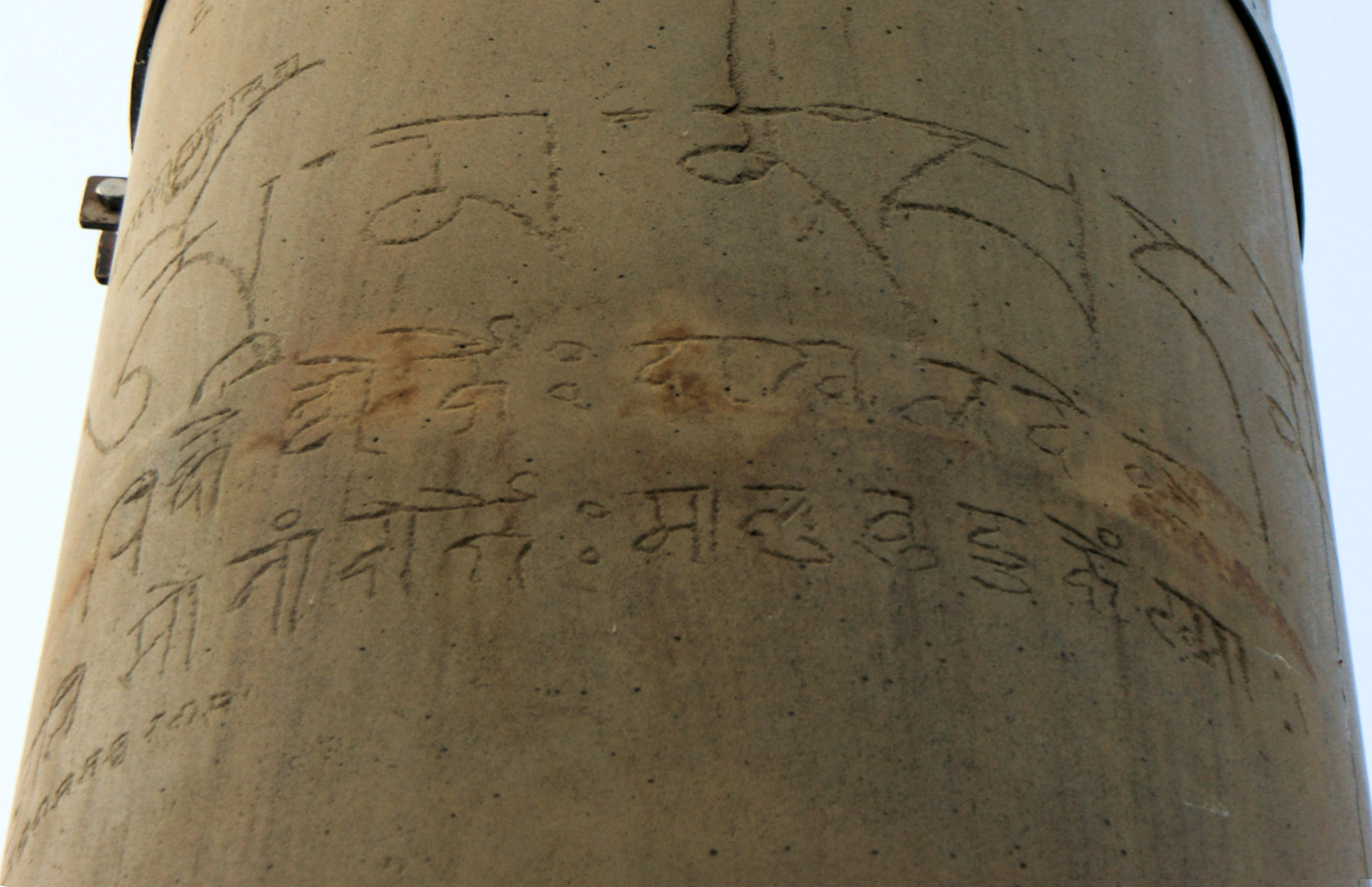
The Lumbini pillar Medieval inscription of Khasa King Ripu Malla: "Om mani padme hum May Prince Ripu Malla be long victorious (1312 CE)"

On the north of this region (present neighbour Dolpa), Buddhism hugely flourished with the arrival of a famous 8th century Buddhist master Padmasambhava (Guru Rinpoche) and other Buddhist lamas who meditated in the region and consecrated many places. Politically, after the 11th century, the archeological records suggests that the region was ruled by the Khasa Kingdom (Tibetan: Ya rtse Kingdom) rulers who were predominantly oriented to shamanism and Buddhism. In their heyday, the kingdom had dominion over large portion of western Tibet and western Nepal and was geographically and historically linked with Central Asia and western Tibet.

The initial Khasa rulers were devout Buddhists themselves, evident by a pilgrimage of King Ripumalla to Lumbini, where he left an inscription on the Ashoka pillar dated around 1312 CE with six-syllable mantra of Buddhism and his wish "Om mani padme hum: May Prince Ripu Malla be long victorious". With time as contacts with the south grew stronger, Hinduism later made a stronghold among the rulers of the region. Both the western Nepalese as well as Tibetan chronicles mention same kings as their "Kings of West Tibet" as well as " Kings of Khasa Kingdom". When the Khasa kingdom disintegrated, one of their descendants named Pitambar is recorded to have ruled the region after defeating the Magar King known as Bokshe Jad and the region subsequently disintegrated into further principalities in the incoming generations until their integration into modern Nepal (1777-1799) by Shah kings.

=== Modern history ===
With the conquest of the district as a part of the national unification campaign, the region was merged with the kingdom of Nepal during the time of Bahadur Shah of Nepal and Rana Bahadur Shah (1777-1799). Before 1975, substantial eastern portion was territorially merged with Palpa district during Rana dynasty and with Baglung District or Dolpa District.

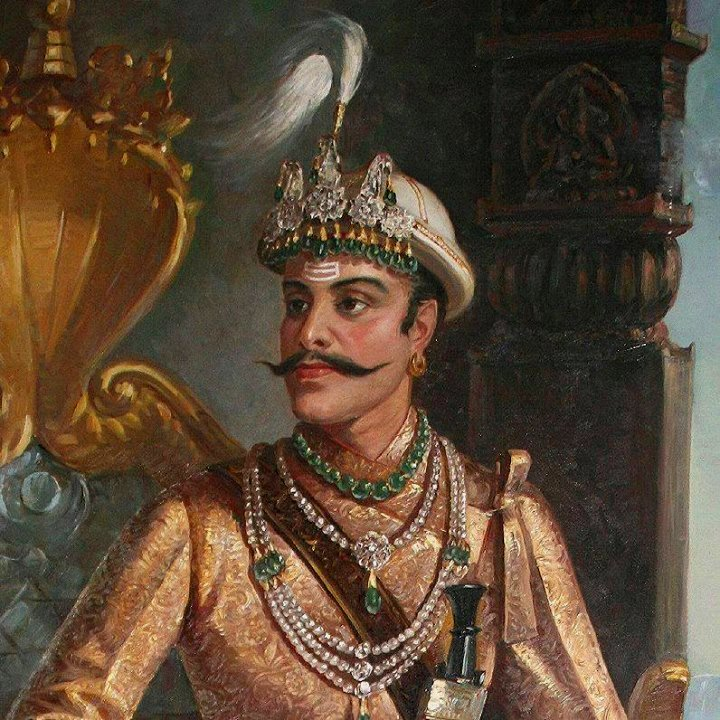
King Rana Bahadur Shah unified the region into modern Nepal (1777-1799)

During the centuries long Shah dynasty and Rana Dynasty rule of Nepal, numerous young women of this region were made Queens (Bada Maharani) and wives of the dynasties through royal marriages, locally known as "Dola Palne" tradition such as: Queen Purna Kumari Devi, the wife of a Rana Prime Minister; Queen Karma Kumari Devi, the wife of Prime Minister Dev Shumsher Jang Bahadur Rana and foster mother of Prime Minister Juddha Shumsher Jang Bahadur Rana. In other cases, the marriages of royal princesses were made with the formerly ruling families of this region, for instance, the marriage of Shova Rajya Lakshmi Devi (Princess Shova Shahi of Nepal), the sister of King Birendra of Nepal and the youngest daughter of king Mahendra of Nepal. After Princess Shova Rajya Lakshmi Devi visited the birth-place of her husband in Bahunthana (Rukumkot), the name of the village was changed to "Shova." These forms of royal marriages created influential feudal families in the region who were well connected with the rulers in Kathmandu by blood or marriages and the majority peasants in the districts were socially and politically sub-ordinate.

==== Hashish Ban of 1976 ====
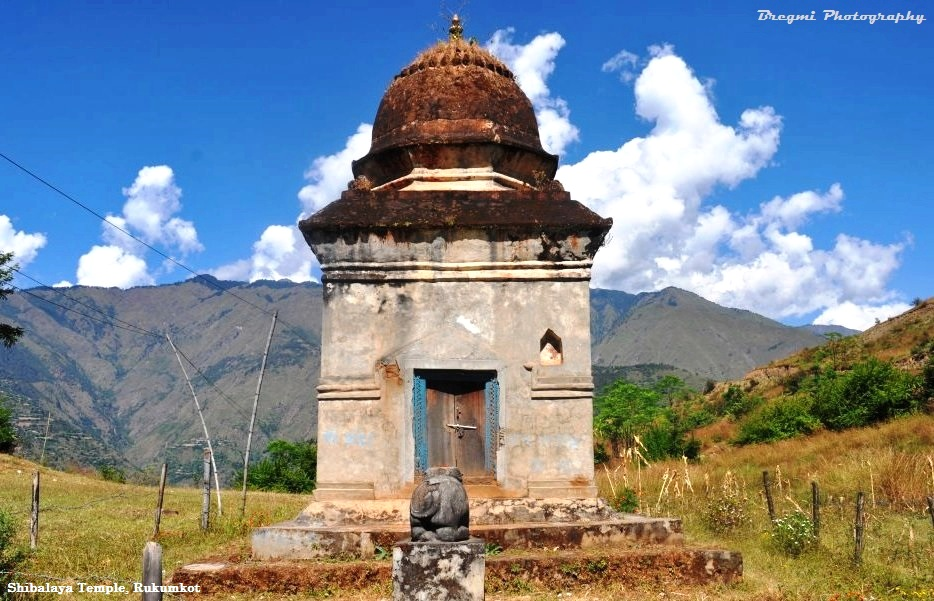
Lord Shiva Temple built by Rana Queen of Nepal, Rani Purna Kumari Devi, who was born in Eastern Rukum.

Prior to 1976, the region was one of the most prosperous in the western Nepalese hills, largely due to production of its world renowned Nepali hashish. Cannibis was mostly produced in the eastern portion of the region, part of the heartland of Nepali cannibis production. In addition to hashish production, the bark of the plant was used to make ropes, fibers were used to make bags, and fine threads were used in clothing. Exports to India in World War II and elsewhere brought great prosperity to the region, commonly reflected in the silver coin necklaces and gold jewelry adorning local Magar women.

This social affluence came to an abrupt halt in 1976 when the Government of Nepal enacted the Drug Trafficking and Abuse Act, largely from the political pressure of the United States of America and Narcotics International, lobbied by the president Richard Nixon. The Nepalese government responded with Drug Trafficking and Abuse Act banning marijuana and hashish in return for American economic aids projects (USAID) in this region - leading to numerous arrests, private land property where marijuana was grown was revoked and given back to the state and farmers were forced to eradicate their marijuana fields before the activity of USAID projects. Although King Birendra made two visits in 1983 and 1988 and promised further economic aid in the region, there was a perception that the actual beneficiaries of the development aids were few elites instead of the local majority, creating further spike in inequality.

==== Growth of Communism & Federalism ====
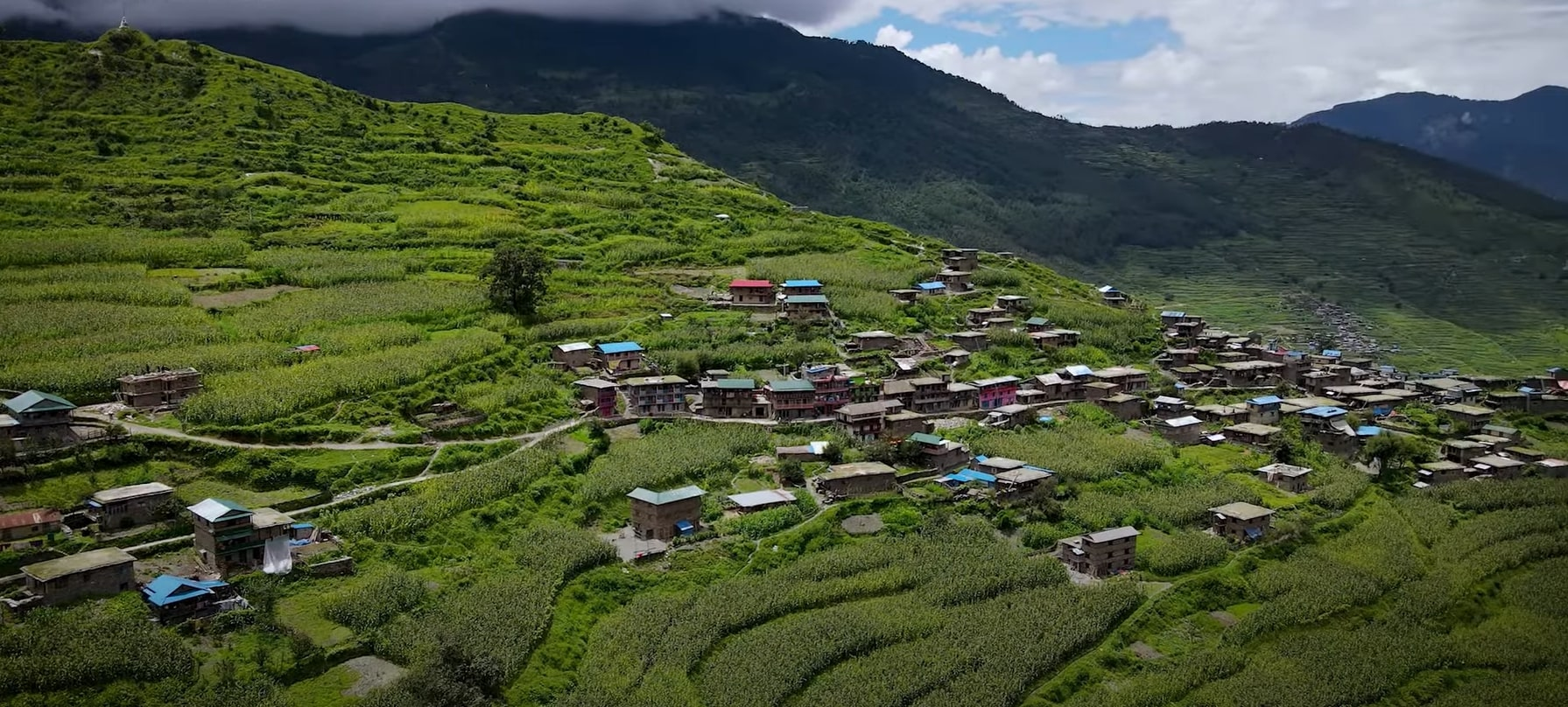
Magar majority villages of Eastern Rukum were heartland of Nepalese Civil War (1996-2006)

After the bitterness arising with the implications of subsequent disruptive state actions, the peasants of the districts began to resonate with the communist parties who were advocating against social and political injustice. Researchers point out that due to lasting feudalism, aristocracy, social inequality within the district, there was a growing dissatisfaction of the larger public towards the elites. As a result, eastern Rukum became one of the earliest communist stronghold of the country during the 20th century. Not surprisingly, it also became the heartland of Nepalese Civil War (Maoist revolution) and the district came to be known as a Magar homeland of the war against land inequality, ethnic inequality, feudalism and aristocracy from 1996 till 2006. The region became a historical base area of the People's War of Nepal and provided many foot soldiers, commanders, prominent leaders and martyrs during the war, ultimately pivoting the country into a democratic Federal republic in 2008 with the end of 240-year-old monarchy.

== Administration ==
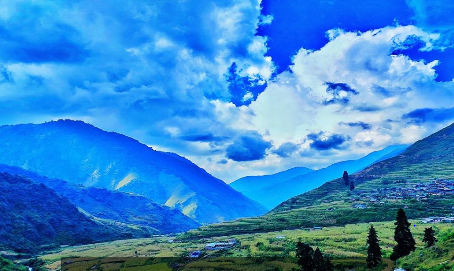
A village in Eastern Rukum

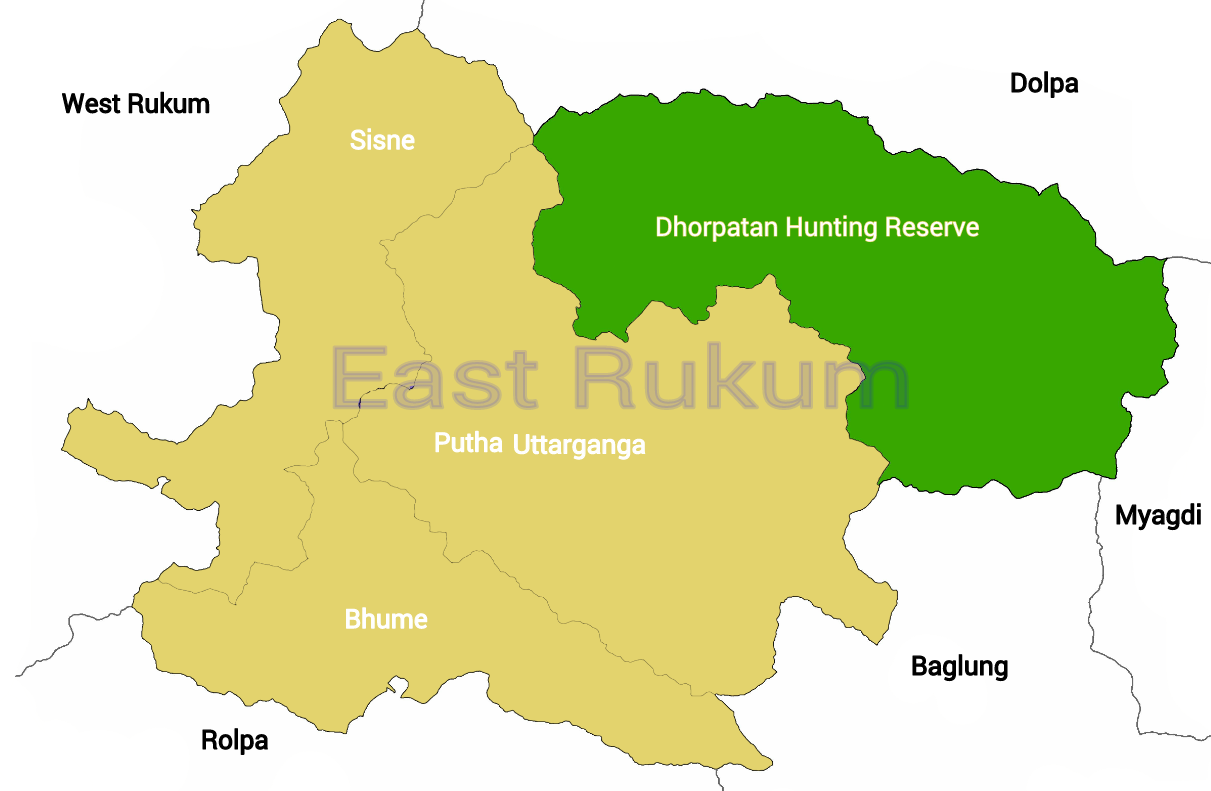
Division of Eastern Rukum

The total area of Eastern Rukum District is 1,161.13 square kilometres (448.31 sq mi) and total population of this district as of 2011 Nepal census is 53,018 individuals. Rukumkot is the interim headquarter of the district. There was a decision of government to relocate the district headquarter from Rukumkot to Golkhada, Kol, Putha Uttarganga, albeit not finalized until now.

The district is divided into three rural municipalities:

Division of Rural Municipalities in Eastern Rukum
Name	Nepali	Population (2011)	Area (km^{2})	Density
Bhume	भूमे	18,589	273.67	68
Putha Uttarganga	पुथा उत्तरगंगा	17,932	560.34	32
Sisne	सिस्ने	16,497	327.12	50

== Demographics ==
At the time of the 2021 Nepal census, Eastern Rukum District had a population of 56,786. 9.89% of the population is under 5 years of age. It has a literacy rate of 71.35% and a sex ratio of 1064 females per 1000 males. The entire population lives in rural areas.

Castes/ethnic groups in Eastern Rukum district (2021)
1. Magar (49.4%)
2. Chhetri (20.1%)
3. Kami (16.7%)
4. Thakuri (4.33%)
5. Damai (3.74%)
6. Bahun (1.51%)
7. Gurung (1.24%)
8. Other Hill Janjati (1.02%)
9. Others (1.89%)

Hill Janjati made up 52% of the population, of which Magars were 49%. Khas people made up 47% of the population, of which Khas Dalits were 21% of the population.

Languages of Eastern Rukum district (2021)
1. Nepali (63.1%)
2. Magar Kham (31.9%)
3. Magar Dhut (3.19%)
4. Khash (1.17%)
5. Others (0.71%)

At the time of the 2021 census, 63.06% of the population spoke Nepali, 31.87% Magar Kham, 3.19% Magar Dhut and 1.17% Khash as their first language. In 2011, 69.1% of the population spoke Nepali as their first language.

Religion in Eastern Rukum District (2021)
Religion	Percent
Hinduism	79.04%
Prakriti	16.63%
Christianity	3.47%
Buddhism	0.86%

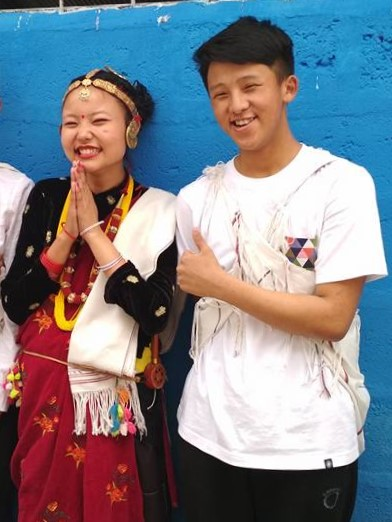
Magars make up the majority of Eastern Rukum demography (51%)

Magars make up the near majority of the population in Eastern Rukum. After Palpa district (53% Magar population), Eastern Rukum has the second-largest Magar population in Nepal as a percentage of the total population (49%), followed by Rolpa (43%).

== Climate & geography ==
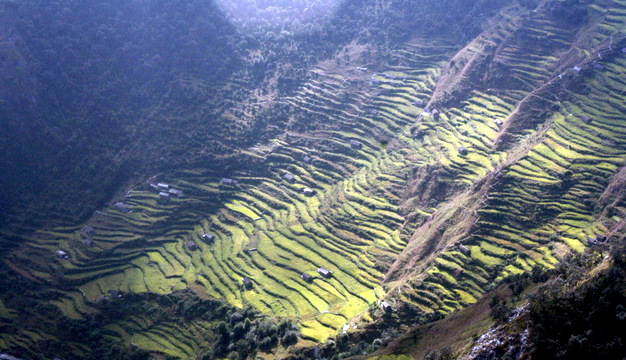
Paddy fields of the district

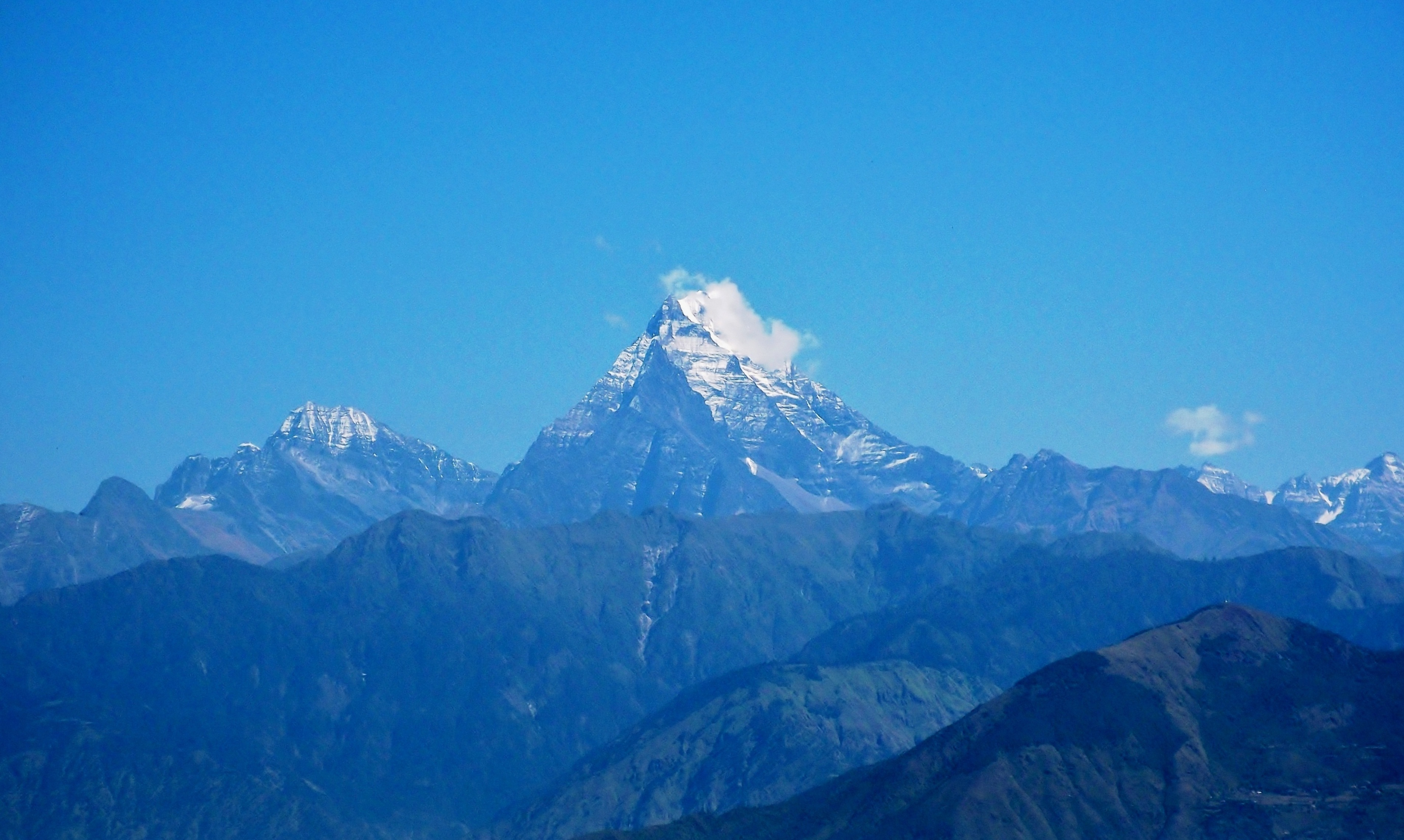
Mountain range of the wider Dhaulagiri Himalaya

Eastern Rukum district is the northernmost part of Lumbini Province, and its only mountain district.

The district falls under are six climate classifications:

Climate classification
Climate Zone	Elevation Range
Upper Tropical	300 to 1,000 meters
Subtropical	1,000 to 2,000 meters
Temperate	2,000 to 3,000 meters
Subalpine	3,000 to 4,000 meters
Alpine	4,000 to 5,000 meters
Nival	above 5,000 meters

=== Dhorpatan Reserve ===
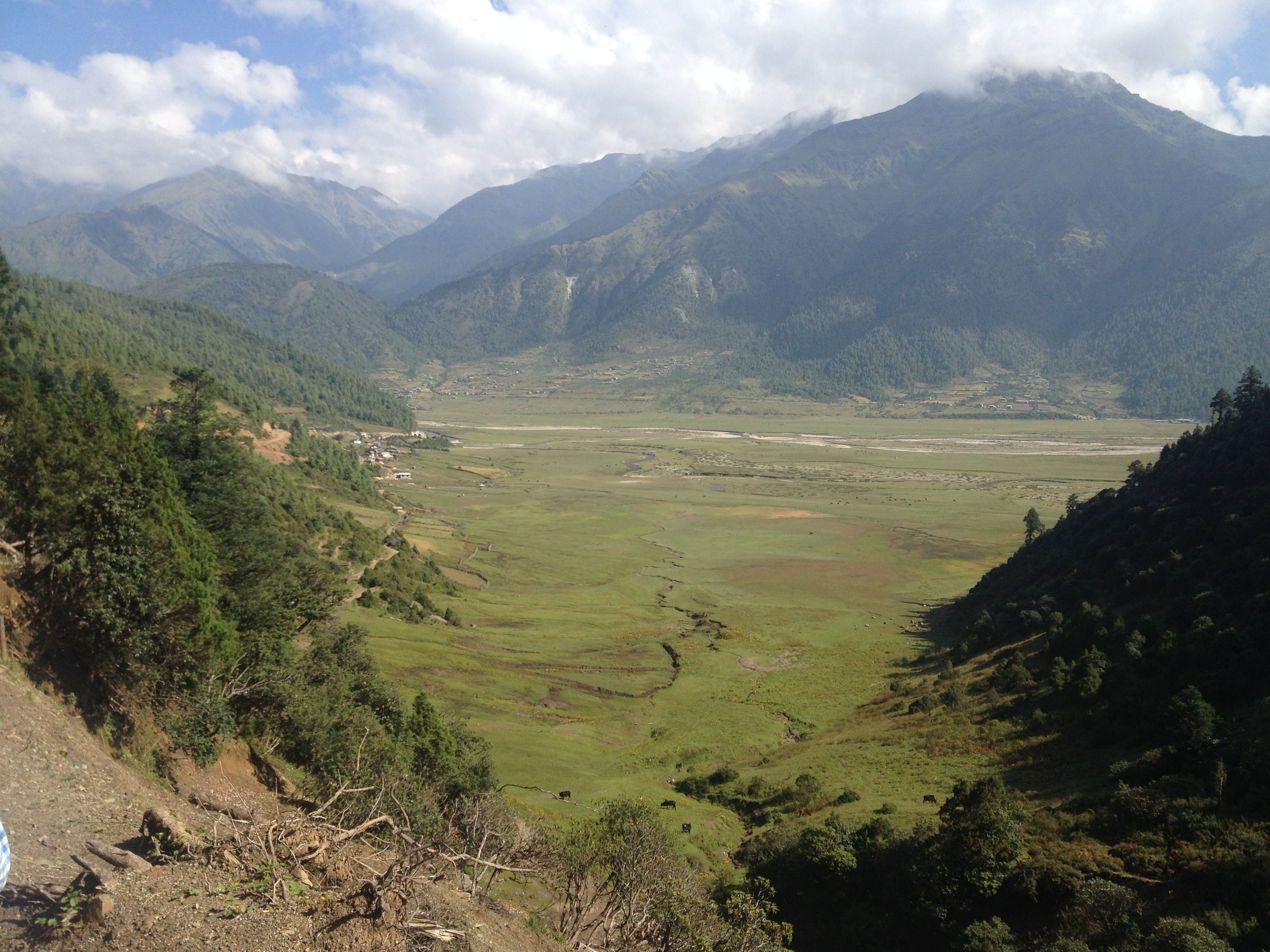
Dhorpatan Reserve

A large reserve area named Dhorpatan Reserve in the district was declared in 1987 with subsequent objective of protection and management of high altitude ecosystem in western Nepal. The reserve extends along the Dhaulagiri Himalayan Range of eastern Rukum, Myagdi and Baglung and covers 1325 square kilometers. Putha, Churen and Gurja Himal extend over the northern boundary of the reserve. Eastern Rukum itself occupies over sixty percentage territory of the reserve.

=== Dhaulagiri Mountains ===
Dhaulagiri mountain range extends from north-west to north-east of Eastern Rukum district and then continues eastward to its highest elevation, Dhaulagiri I, the 7th highest mountain in the world. The Kali Gandaki river gorge separates Dhaulagiri range and Annapurna range forming two mountain ranges in western Nepal.

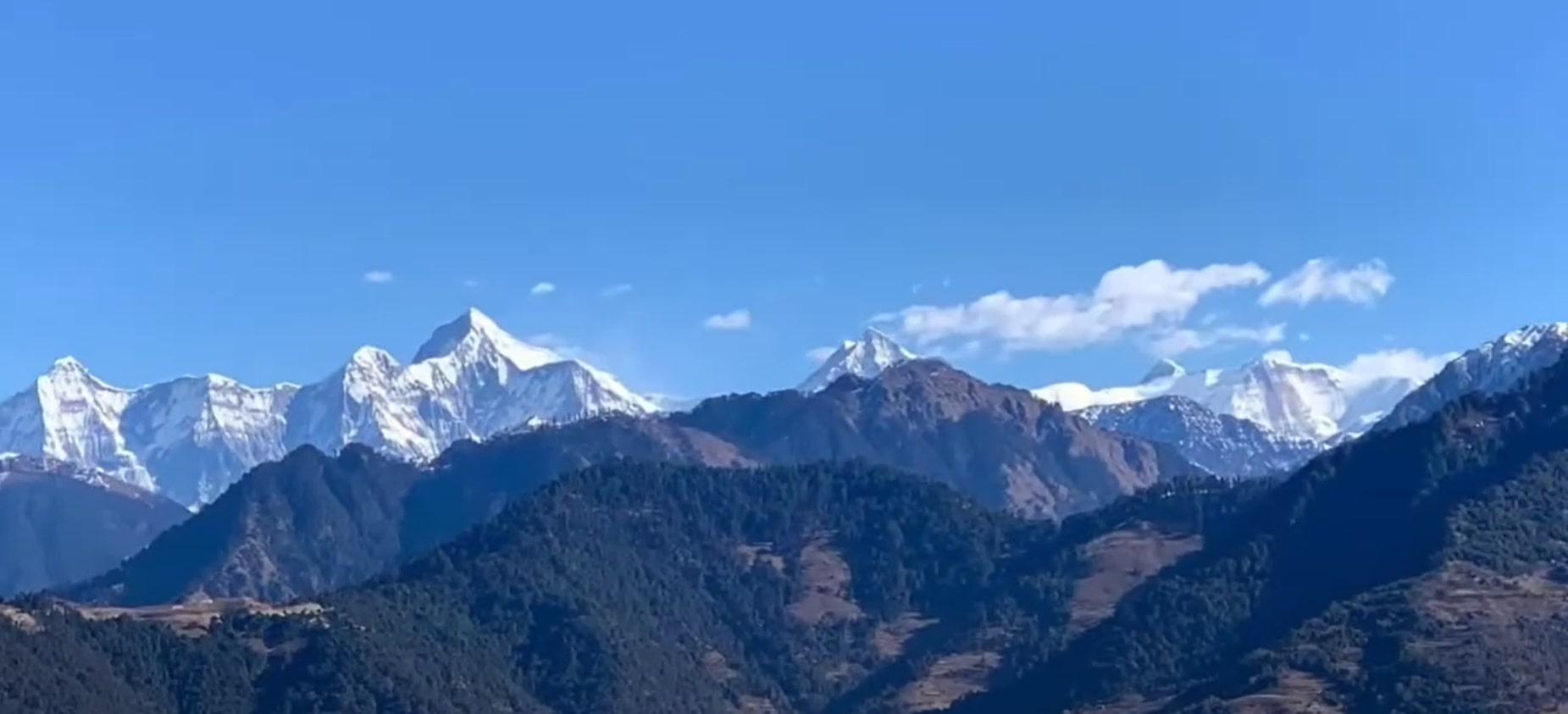
Dhaulagiri Himalayas of Eastern Rukum featuring some of the prominent 7,000 meter mountains of Nepal

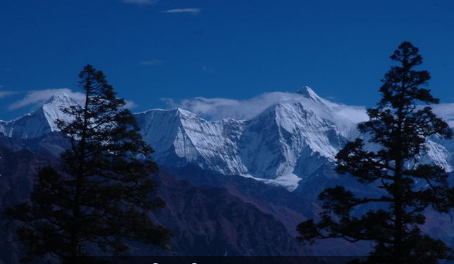
Mt. Putha (Dhaulagiri VII) / Putha Hiunchuli (7,246m)

All along the Dhaulagiri range, the prominent mountains in the district are Mt. Putha Hiunchuli (Dhaulagiri VII) and Mount Sisne. Mount Putha is also the tallest mountain of Lumbini Province situated in the west end of Dhaulagiri II mountain chain, at an elevation of 7,246 meters. It was first climbed in 1954 by J. O. M. Roberts and Ang Nyima Sherpa.

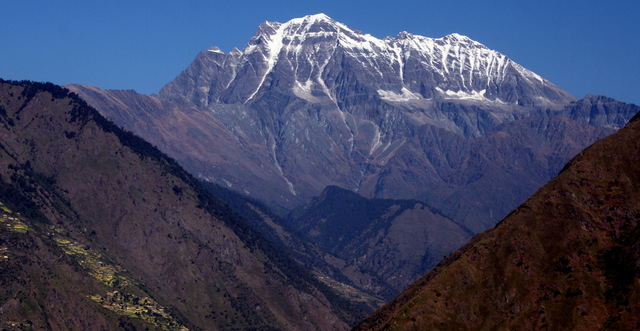
Mt Sisne (5,849m)

Another prominent mountain is Mount Sisne at the north. Locally known as Mount Sisne or Murkatta Himal, the mountain has an elevation of 5,849 meters. Mount Sisne was frequently featured in the literatures of civil war, as a symbol of the people's revolution and became an iconic landmark to revolutionaries during the 1996–2006 Nepal Civil War. In 2013, the mountain was first successfully ascended by a Nepalese expedition led by Man Bahadur Khatri.

List of peaks of Eastern Rukum
S/N	Mountains	Elevation (meters)	Range	Additional Information
1	Mount Putha I	7,246	Dhaulagiri Range	First ascent in 1954 by J.O.M Roberts and Ang Nyima Sherpa
2	Mount Putha II (Putha shoulder)	6,598	Dhaulagiri Range	
3	Mount Dogari (South)	6,315	Dhaulagiri Range	
4	Mount Samjang	5,924	Dhaulagiri Range	
5	Hiunchuli Patan	5,916	Dhaulagiri Range	
6	Mount Nimku	5,864	Dhaulagiri Range	
7	Mount Sisne II	5,854	Dhaulagiri Range	
8	Mount Sisne I	5,849	Dhaulagiri Range	Date of first ascent: 26/05/2021 AD

=== Water System ===
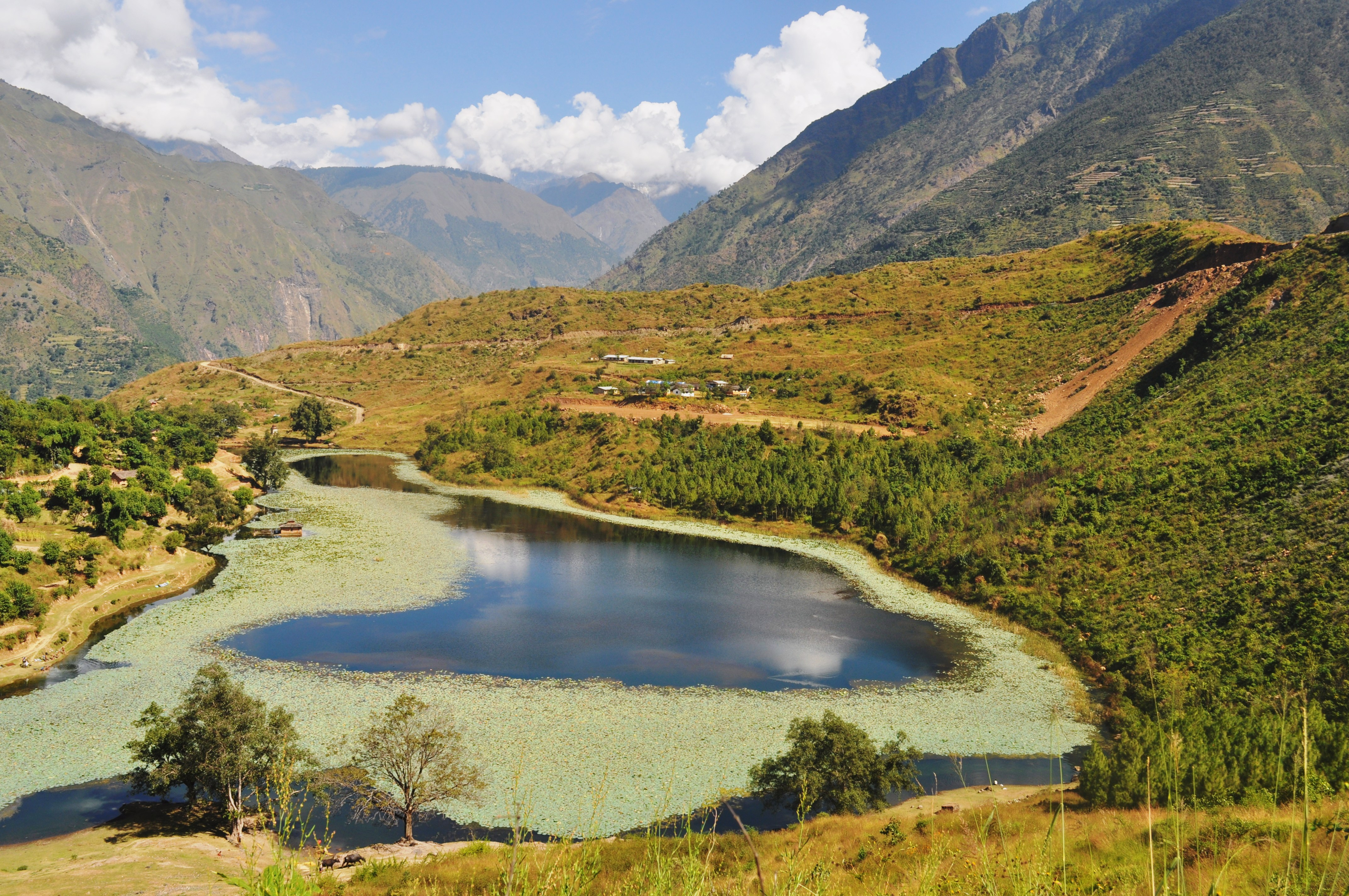
Rukmini Lake, named after Krishna's consort in the Mahābhārata

Most of the district is drained by west-flowing tributaries such as Uttar Ganga draining Dhorpatan Valley and to the north of that the Sani Bheri draining southern slopes of the western Dhaulagiri Himalaya.

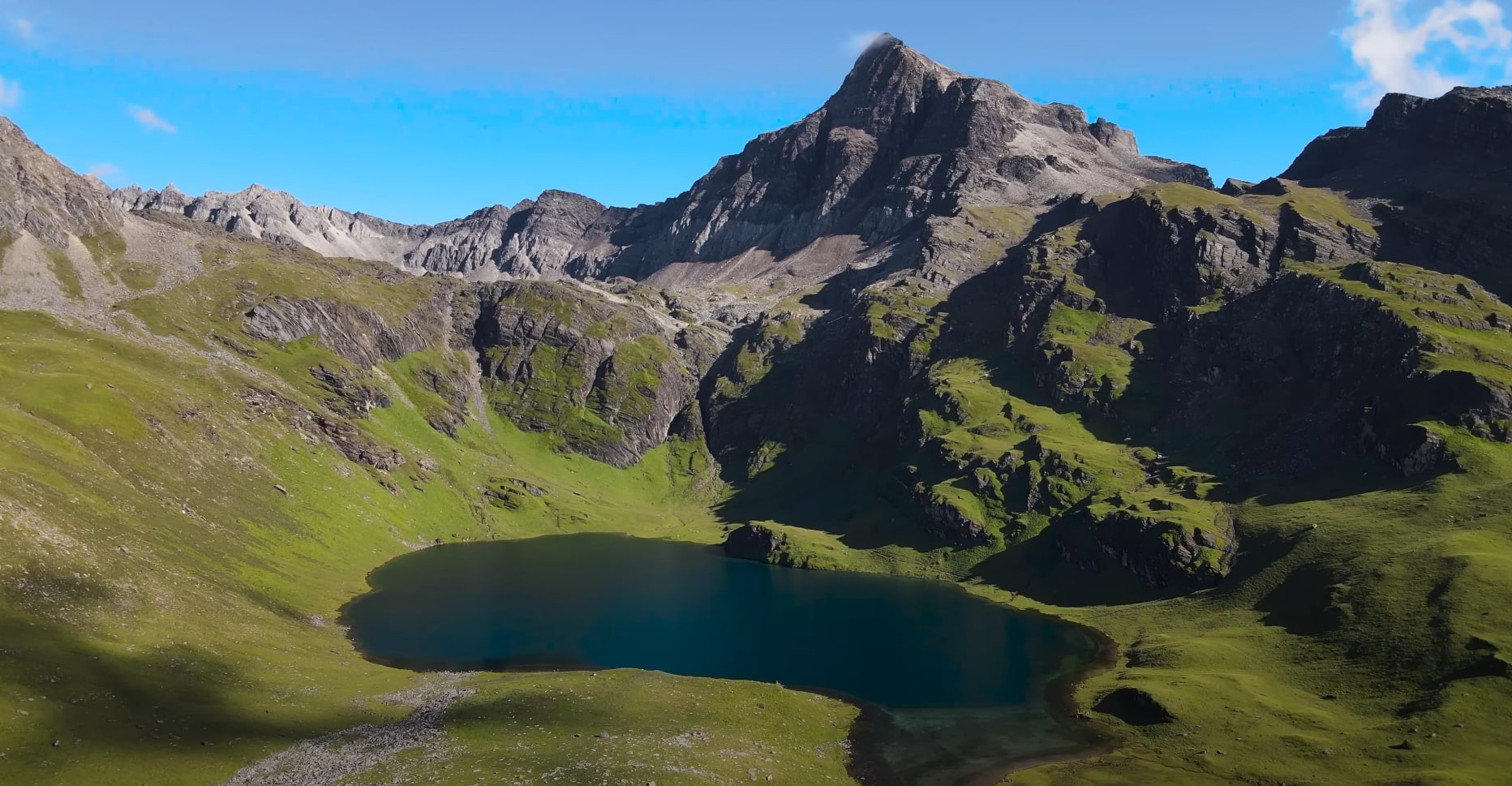
Sundaha lake in Dhorpatan reserve

West Rapti river has its source in Eastern Rukum in the Mahabharata range of the lesser himalayas. The river drains in Nepal and into Uttar Pradesh state in India before joining Ghaghara which ultimately joins the Ganges. The West Rapti river is also associated with the ethnic groups of Nepal – Kham Magar in the highlands and Tharu in the Inner Terai. The river has also been associated with the ancient river Airavati (also known as Aciravati /Achirvati) and as Eravai in Jainism. In Buddhism, the ancient city of Sravasti was situated in the western bank of Achirvati where the Buddha spent most of his post-enlightenment life.

Among many lakes, Rukmini Lake has been the centerpeice in the district. Named after Rukmini, the consort of Krishna, Rukmini Lake is also known as Lotus Lake (Nepali: Kamal Taal) because of its fullness with lotus flowers (Nelumbo nucifera). The lake holds a religious and sacred importance to the locals due to which huge gathering occurs during the festivals of Maha Shivaratri, Dashain, Maghe Sankranti and Haritalika Teej.

== Culture & language ==
The majority Magar culture with a complex of the Kham Magar language of the Sino-Tibetan language family suggests its preserved development in Eastern Rukum, on the south western flank of the Dhaulagiri massif. Traditionally found living in the high valleys (2,000–2,500 m altitude), Kham Magars constitute a specific ethno-linguistic community of the Magar people within the 4 northern sub-tribes: Bhuda (Bura), Gharti, Rokha and Pun and have retained their own indigenous Kham language. Demographically: 63.1% speak Nepali, 31.9% Kham and 3.2% Magar Dhut as their main languages at home.

Main language spoken at home in Eastern Rukum
Languages	Percentages
Nepali	63.10%
Magar Kham	31.9%
Magar Dhut	3.2%

== Economy ==
=== Electricity ===
As a district with high hydro-electricity potential due to down streaming rivers and plenty of water bodies, there have been efforts to maximise energy potential in the district. With this objective, 27 small-to-medium scale hydro-power stations have been established producing 1,210 KW of electricity. The district's largest hydro-power station, run-of-river type, of 5 MW is still under construction with a cost of Rs 1 Billion. In addition to these stations, there are existing water mills and solar systems to garner electricity.

Energy production statistics of Eastern Rukum
Means of Production	Numbers
Small-to-medium scale hydro-power stations	27
Large scale hydropower, 5MW	1
Traditional water mills	127
Refined water mills	9
Solar systems	7440

=== Agriculture and rare medicinal herbs ===
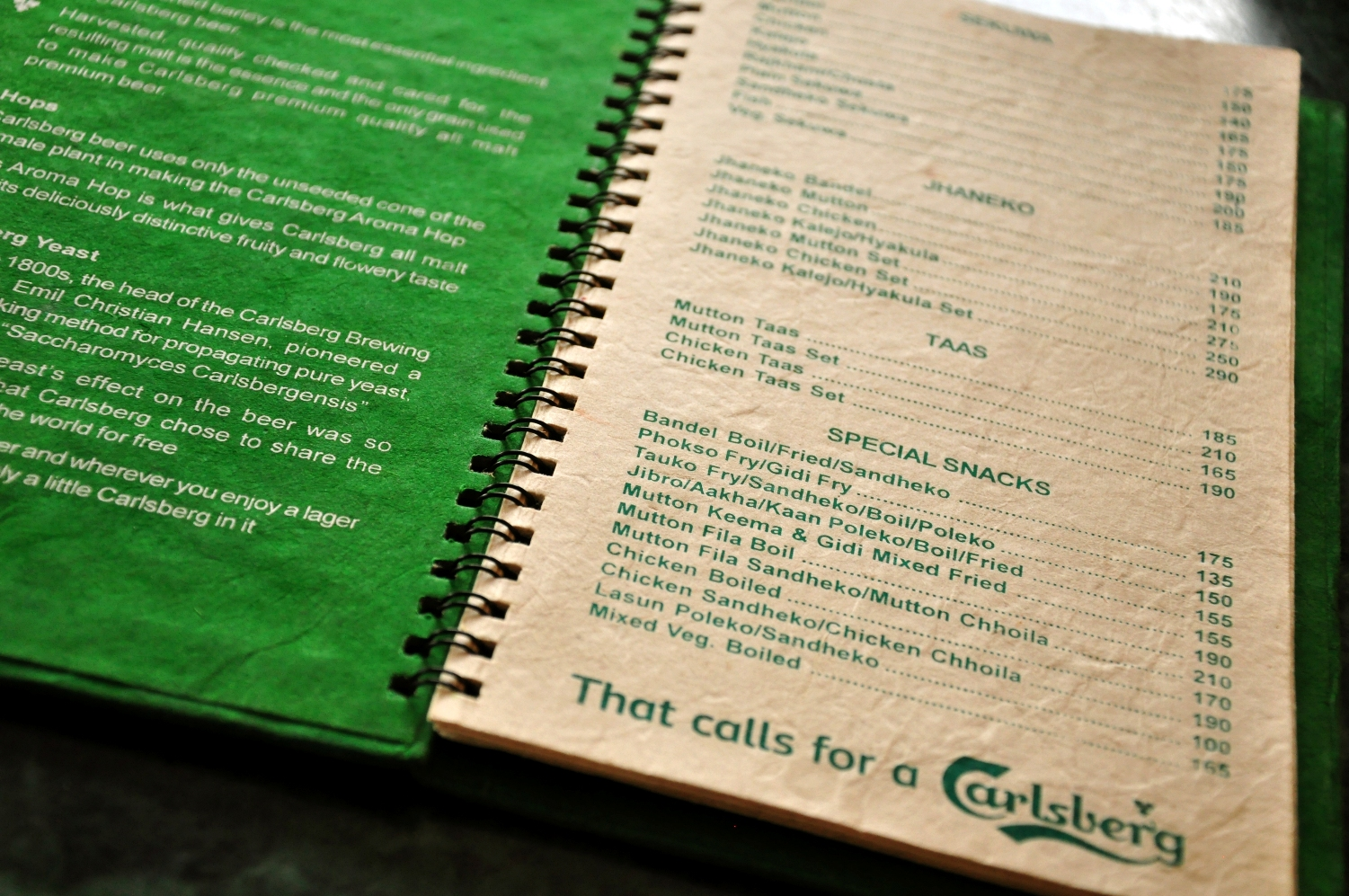
Eastern Rukum exports Nepalese Lokta paper (A Restaurant menu made with lokta)

The six-climatic mixture of upper tropical, sub-tropical, alpine, sub-alpine, temperate and nival climates in the district have given way to the production of radish, potato, Pidalu, onion, rayo, garlic, turmeric, ginger, tomato, persimmon, golbheda, ramatoria, bitter gourd, brinjal, chillies, peas, carrot, cauliflower, cabbage, cucumber, squash, bananas, mango, orange, lemon, season, apple, pear, arubkhada, okhar etc. In addition to these vegetables and fruits, the medicinal herbs such as Yarsagumba, Panchaole, Kurilo, Timur, Cinnamon, Gurjo, Katuki, Pangar, Badalpate, Bojo, Harro, Amla, Padamchal, Satuwa, Halhale, Kumkum, Chiraito, Jatamasi, Bhalayo etc. are procured. The most famous among them, Yarsagumba (known as Ophiocordyceps Sinensis) is classified as a medicinal mushroom with a long usage in the Himalayan region, Tibetan and Chinese medicine. In addition, the crops such as paddy, wheat, maize, millet, barley, uva, fapar etc. are grown in their season and constitute the staple food diet as well.

=== Minerals ===
A Himalayan sub-region, the region has been found conducive for the mining of copper, glass, coal, iron, chalk, shilajita and Sulphur. In addition to this, non-metallic ore such as Dolomite have been discovered.

=== Nepalese paper ===
As a paper producing district, due to the availability of Lokta plants, the fibrous inner bark of these high altitude evergreen shrubs are used to produce paper in Eastern Rukum. These papers are hand-made and produced in batches, whereby each batch processes about 12.5 kg of raw materials. As one of the rare Nepalese products, all the supply chain elements are based on local resources which are then ultimately made into paper products and exported to Europe and North America.

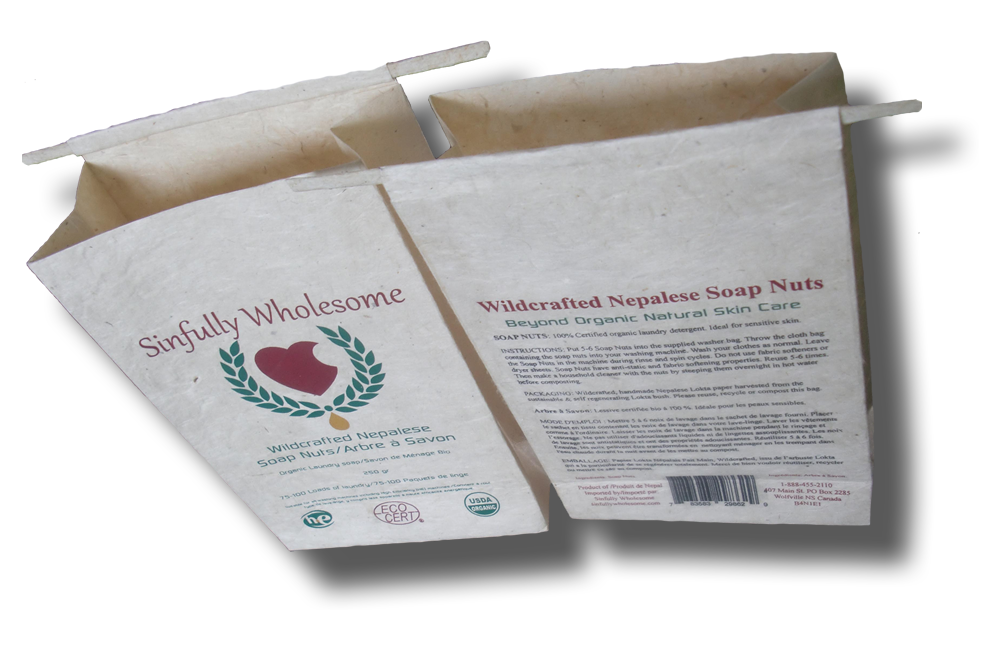
Handmade lokta paper bags

The chief exports from the district are vegetables, seeds, Nepalese paper, blankets, threads and mineral.

== Education ==
Post federalism in Nepal, the district is now classified as one of the fully literate districts of the country, with over 95% of literacy rate.

== Tourism ==
In recent years, Eastern Rukum has become a tourist destination of the country, also reflected in the Government of Nepal's official designation. The trekking agencies usually provide trekking routes with a focus on Dhaulagiri mountain range and Magar villages of Eastern Rukum.

=== Guerilla Trek ===
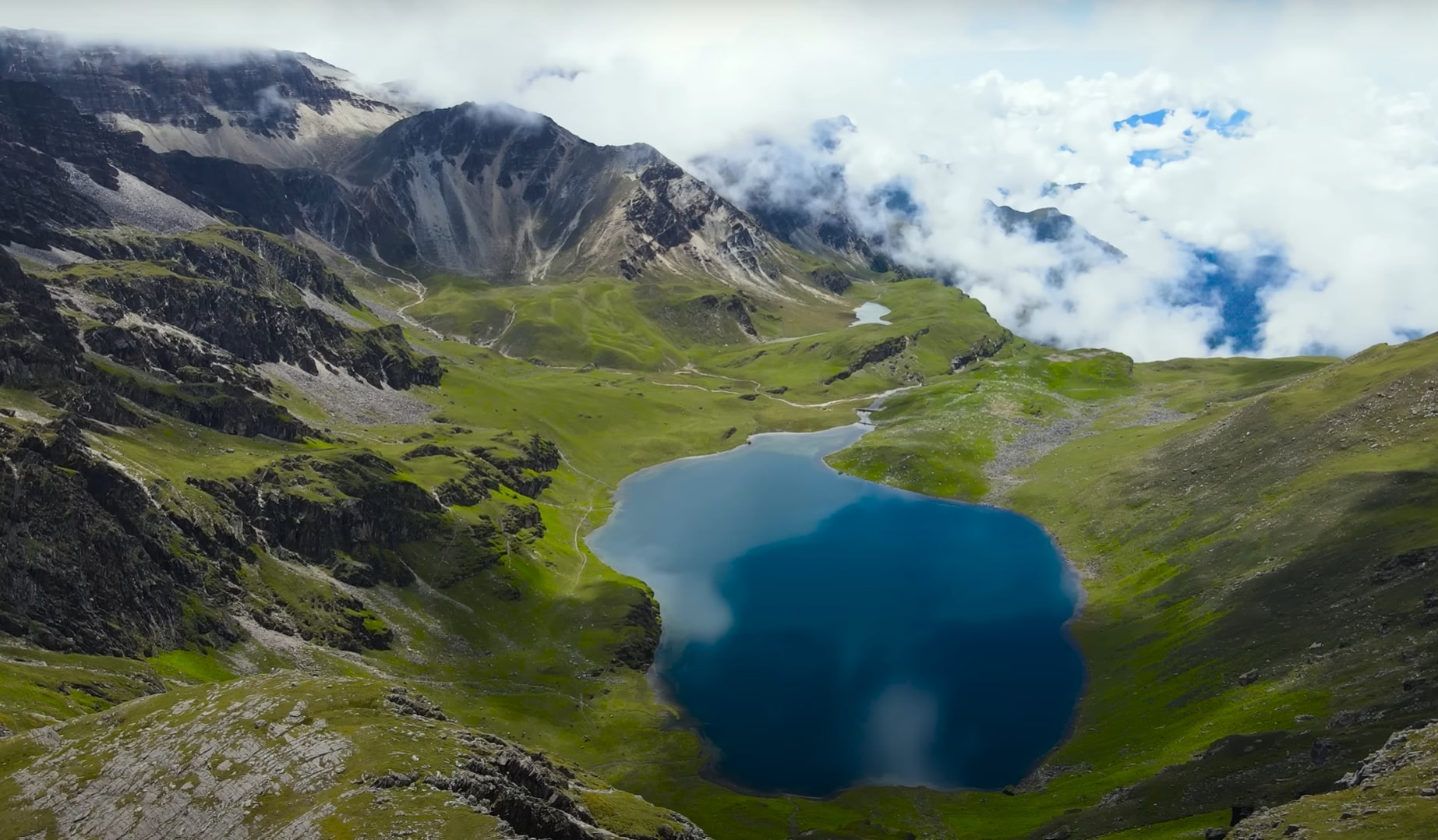
Sundaha lake along Dhorpatan

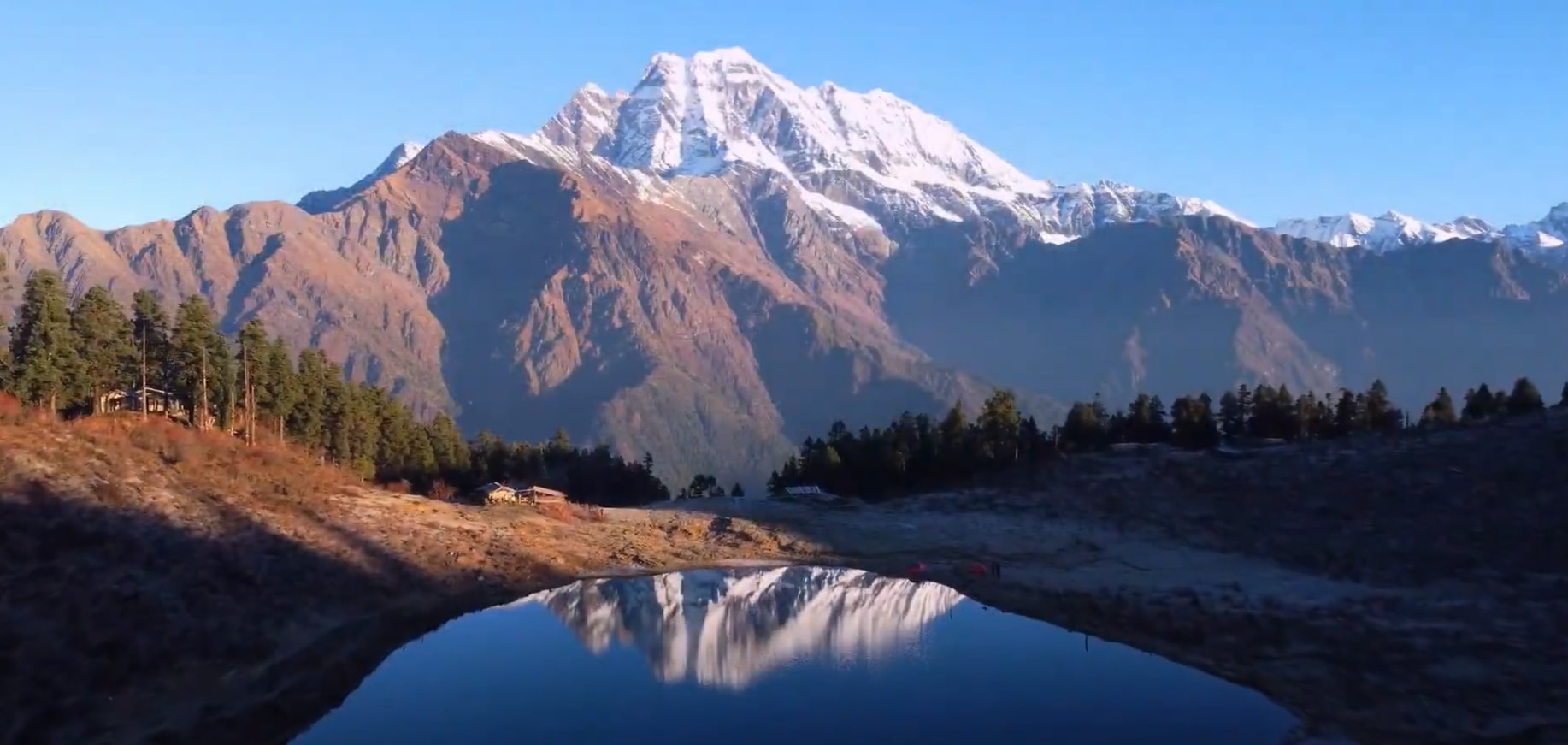
Mount Sisne in the north

Nepal Tourism Board has designated official trekking route called Guerilla Trek which is a tourism adventure-track following the trails of guerillas (Maoist revolutionaries) during the ten-year war (Nepalese Civil War) against the royal government, in their rebel heartland in the majority Magars villages. Trekkers can retrace the route of the fighters in this district as well as neighbouring northern Rolpa District, Baglung District and Myagdi District and experience traditional Magar culture.

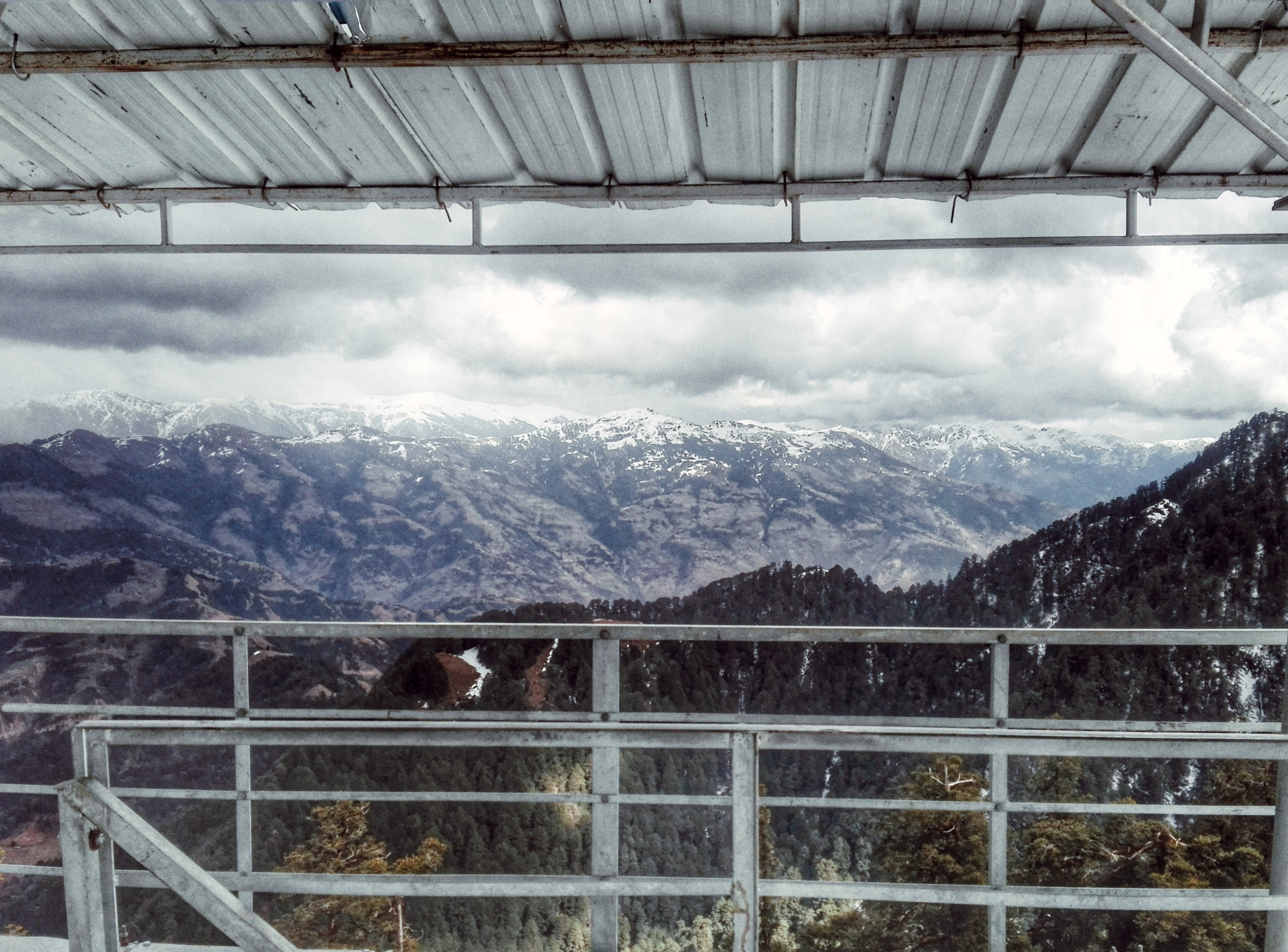
Views of Himalayas mountains of Eastern Rukum along Guerilla trek

Other important tracks of the route are Chunwang, the landmark meeting place of the party leadership in eastern Rukum and Thabang (6480 ft, 1975 m), the cradle of the war of Rolpa where the Maoists had almost unanimous support and which suffered some of the heaviest fighting during the war.

=== Gateway to Dolpa ===
Often considered a gateway to Dolpa, the Jangla Pass at 4,538 meters is the edge of the Dhorpatan Reserve and provides a passage to Dolpa. Dolpa, a district hidden from globalisation, is more oriented to Tibetan Buddhism and is full of hidden valleys and ancient Buddhist shrines some of whom are associated with 8th century master Guru Rinpoche (Padmasambhava). A reminiscence of ancient Tibet, Dolpo is still monitored and a pass is required for the tourists.

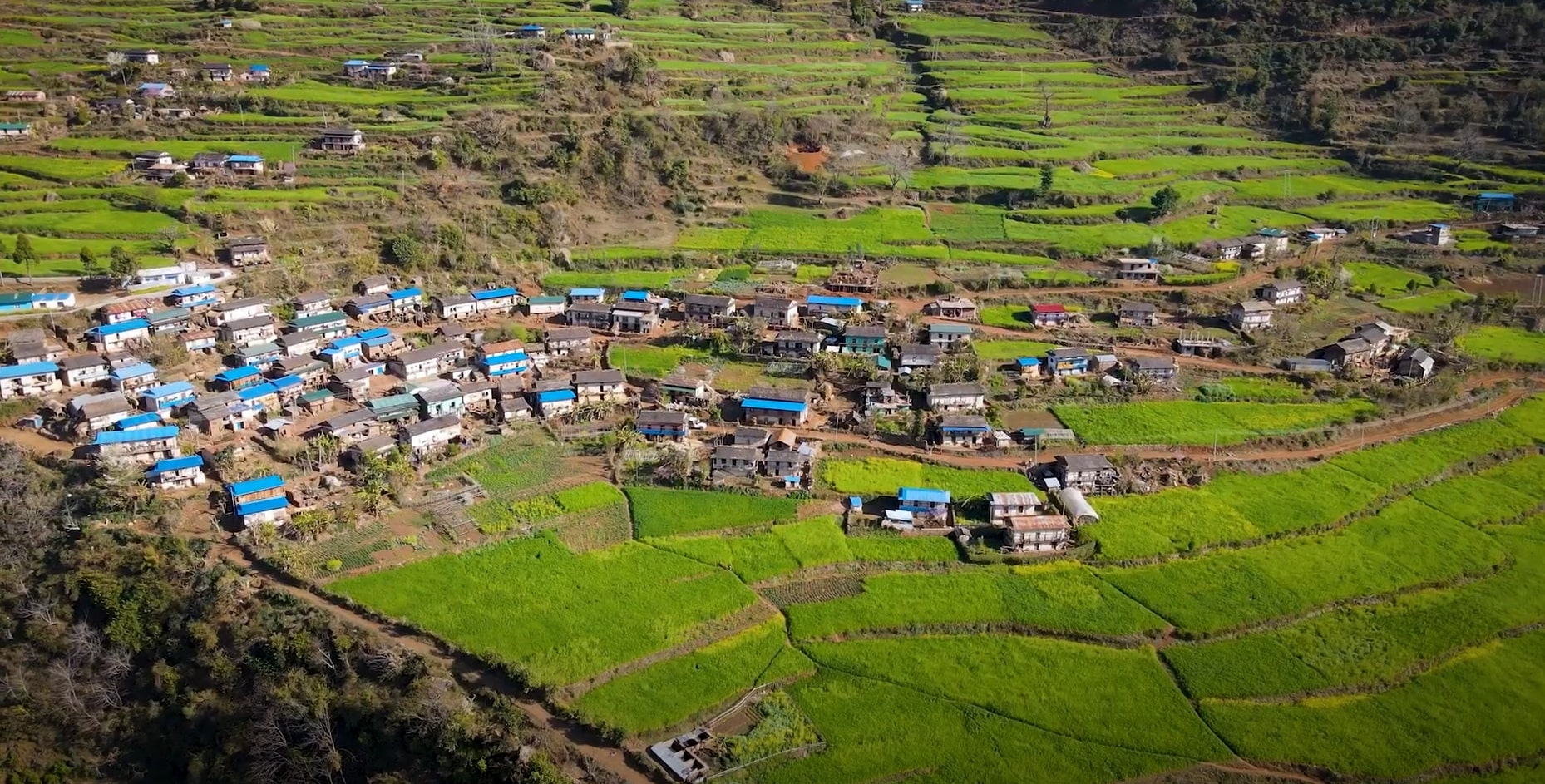
Magar settlement in east Rukum

=== Kham Magar Culture ===
Perhaps due to relative isolation in high altitudes, Magars in eastern Rukum have been able to retain their indigenous language and cultures which have become a center point of attraction. The peculiarly designed houses and their festivals are peculiar, such as the Bhume Naach (Earth Dance) which is performed around a fire, representing Earth as a mother and protector. The dance normally takes place from mid-May to mid-June. Men dance on the center and the women dancers encircle them - the outer circle of women symbolising the mother and protection to the community as well as gratitude to mother earth.

== See also ==
- Lumbini Province
- Magars
- Kham
