= Rukumkot =

Rukumkot रुकुमकोट
- Village development committee
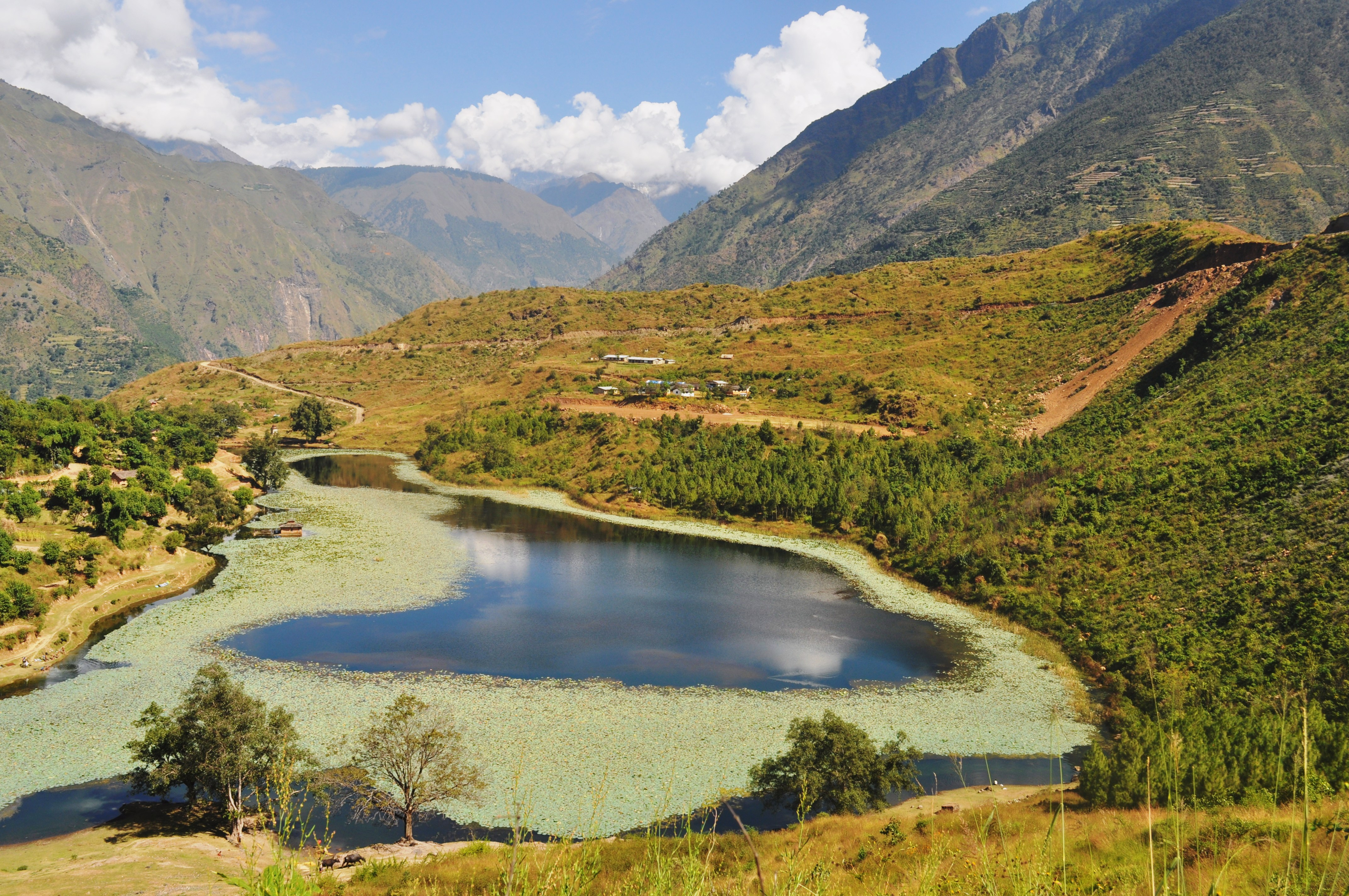
- Rukmini Taal, Rukumkot

- Location in Nepal Rukumkot (Nepal)
- Coordinates: 28.37°N 82.37°E
- Country: Nepal
- Province: Lumbini Province
- District: Eastern Rukum District

Population (2011)
  - Total: 5,498
- Time zone: UTC+5:45 (Nepal Time)
- Postal code: 22002
- Area code: +977-88
- Website: www.ddcrukum.gov.np

ChurjhariRukumk (Nepali: रुकुमकोट) is a town in a valley of the Eastern Rukum District in Nepal. Nearby is a pond called Rukmini Tal (local name: Kamal Dhaha; Nepali: कमलदह). There is a historic Shibalaya temple nearby. Other temples include the Barah, Baraji, and Bhagwati temples.

The nickname of Rukum, "Baunna Pokhari Tripanna Takuri" (Place of 52 Lakes and 53 Hills), is derived from the name Rukumkot. It is believed that there are 52 ponds and lakes and 53 hills in Rukumkot.

A road was built to Rukumkot with the help of India. Another road is now being developed in the middle part of Rukumkot.

Shibalaya, a temple to Shiva on the northern shore of Rukmini Taal, was built by Purna Kumari, the wife of a Prime Minister of the Rana Dynasty. It is said that this temple is the only monument made during the Rana reign in the mid-western part of Nepal.

There is a cave in the eastern part of Rukumkot, on the bank of the Rumgad River, called Deurali Gufa. It can only be visited by walking for one hour from Rukumkot.

Climate data for Rukumkot, elevation 1,560 m (5,120 ft)
Month	Jan	Feb	Mar	Apr	May	Jun	Jul	Aug	Sep	Oct	Nov	Dec	Year
Mean daily maximum °C (°F)	14.4 (57.9)	16.0 (60.8)	20.4 (68.7)	26.4 (79.5)	27.7 (81.9)	26.6 (79.9)	24.8 (76.6)	25.0 (77.0)	24.2 (75.6)	22.9 (73.2)	19.1 (66.4)	15.9 (60.6)	22.0 (71.5)
Mean daily minimum °C (°F)	3.3 (37.9)	4.5 (40.1)	8.4 (47.1)	12.9 (55.2)	15.2 (59.4)	17.1 (62.8)	17.6 (63.7)	17.3 (63.1)	16.2 (61.2)	12.9 (55.2)	7.1 (44.8)	3.8 (38.8)	11.4 (52.4)
Average precipitation mm (inches)	37.2 (1.46)	50.9 (2.00)	48.5 (1.91)	66.7 (2.63)	158.0 (6.22)	402.7 (15.85)	653.4 (25.72)	627.2 (24.69)	270.6 (10.65)	73.8 (2.91)	25.4 (1.00)	15.9 (0.63)	2,430.3 (95.67)
Source 1: Australian National University
Source 2: Japan International Cooperation Agency (precipitation)
