= Tukuche Peak =

Mountain in Nepal

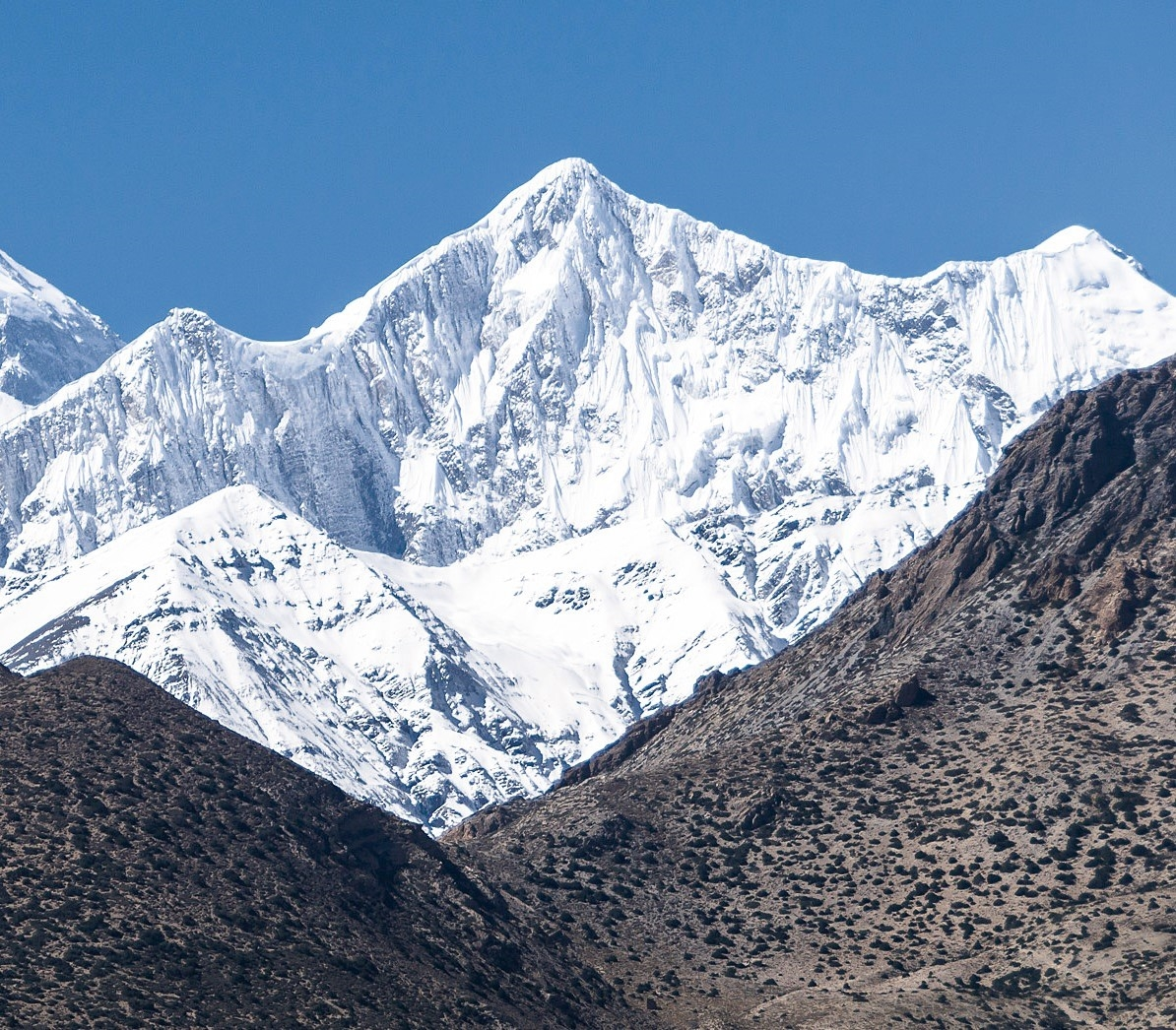
- East aspect

Highest point
- Elevation: 6,920 m (22,703 ft)
- Prominence: 1,050 m (3,445 ft)
- Parent peak: Dhaulagiri
- Isolation: 6.83 km (4.24 mi)
- Coordinates: 28°44′46″N 83°33′39″E

Geography
- Location within Nepal
- Interactive map of Tukuche Peak
- Country: Nepal
- Province: Gandaki
- District: Mustang / Myagdi
- Parent range: Himalayas; Dhaulagiri

Climbing
- First ascent: 1969
- Easiest route: Northwest Ridge

Tukuche Peak is a mountain in Nepal.

== Description ==
Tukuche Peak is a 6,920-metre (22,703-foot) glaciated summit in the Nepalese Himalayas. It is situated 8.4 kilometres (5.2 mi) northeast of Dhaulagiri and 70 kilometres (43 mi) northwest of Pokhara in Gandaki Province. Precipitation runoff from the mountain's slopes drains to the Gandaki River which is a tributary of the Ganges. Topographic relief is significant as the east face rises 1,550 metres (5,085 ft) in one kilometre (0.62 mi), and the summit rises 4,370 metres (14,337 ft) above the Gandaki River in less than nine kilometres (5.6 mi). The first ascent of the summit was made on May 10, 1969, by Georges Hartmann, Aloïs Strickler, and Sherpa Sonam Girmi. Three days later, Alfred Hitz and Ruedi Homberger from the same Swiss expedition summited.

== Climate ==
Based on the Köppen climate classification, Tukuche Peak is located in a tundra climate zone with cold, snowy winters, and cool summers. Weather systems coming off the Bay of Bengal are forced upwards by the Himalaya mountains (orographic lift), causing heavy precipitation in the form of rainfall and snowfall. Mid-June through early-August is the monsoon season. The months of April, May, September, and October offer the most favorable weather for viewing or climbing this peak.

== Gallery ==
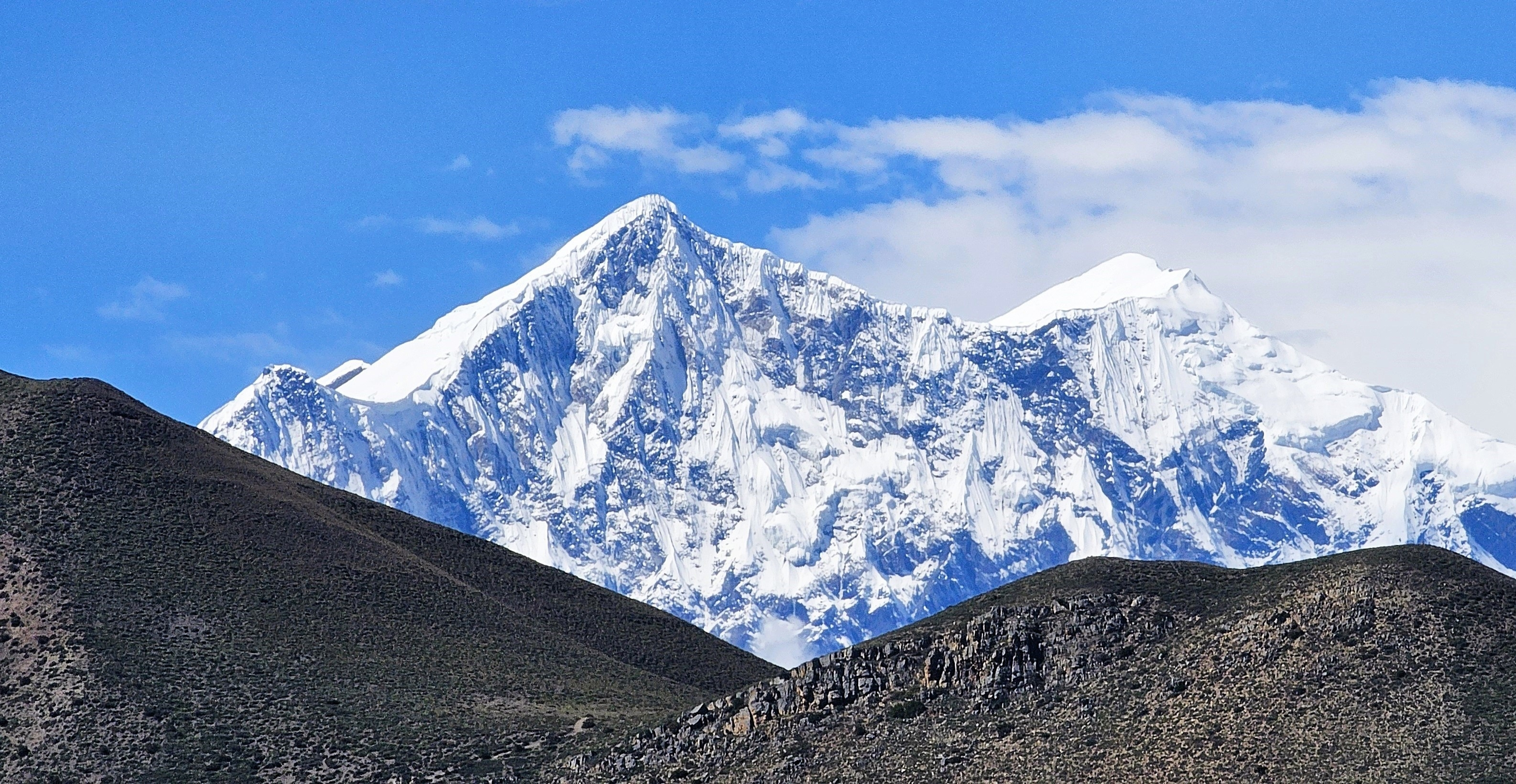
East aspect

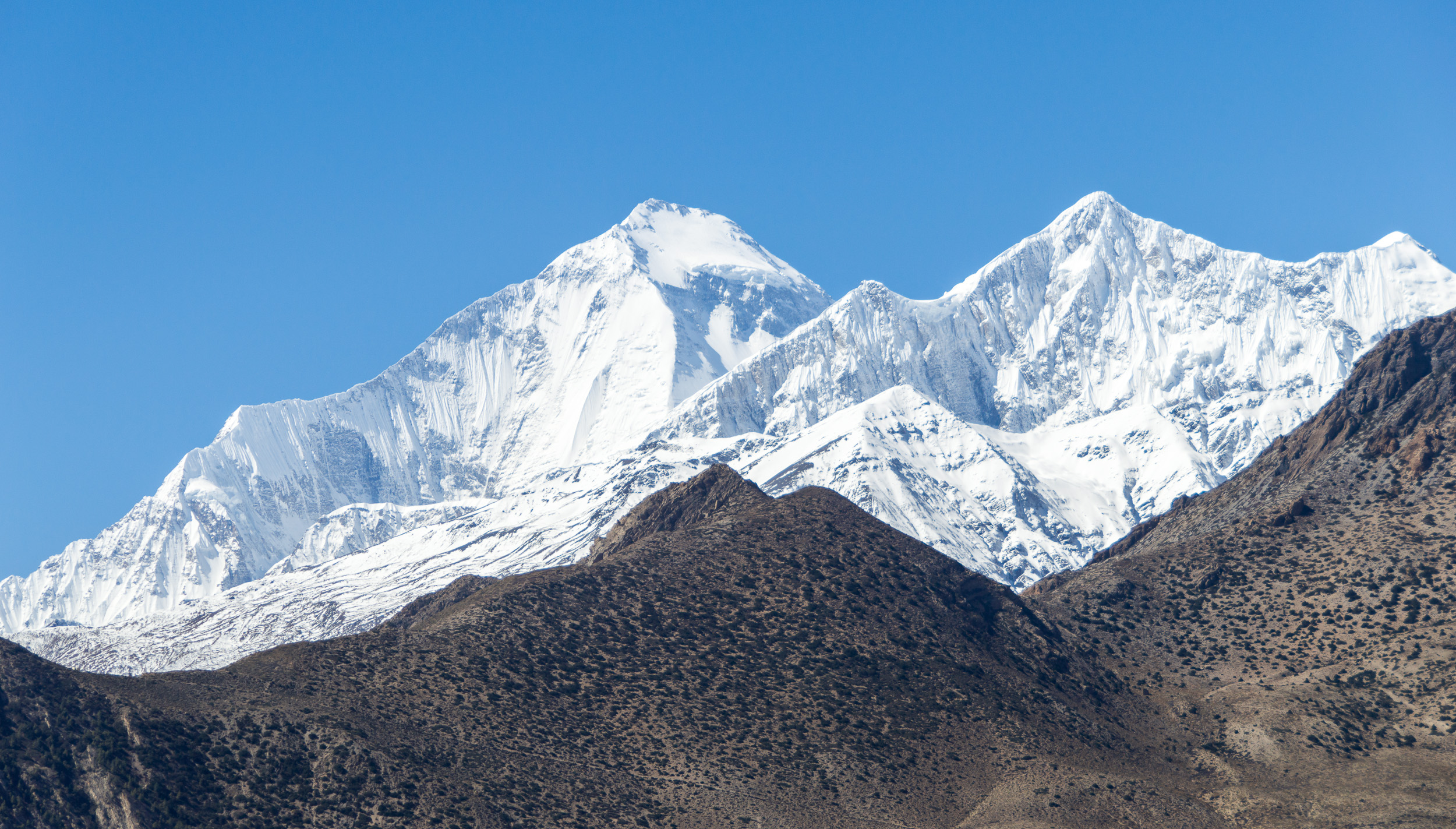
Dhaulagiri (center) and Tukuche Peak (right)

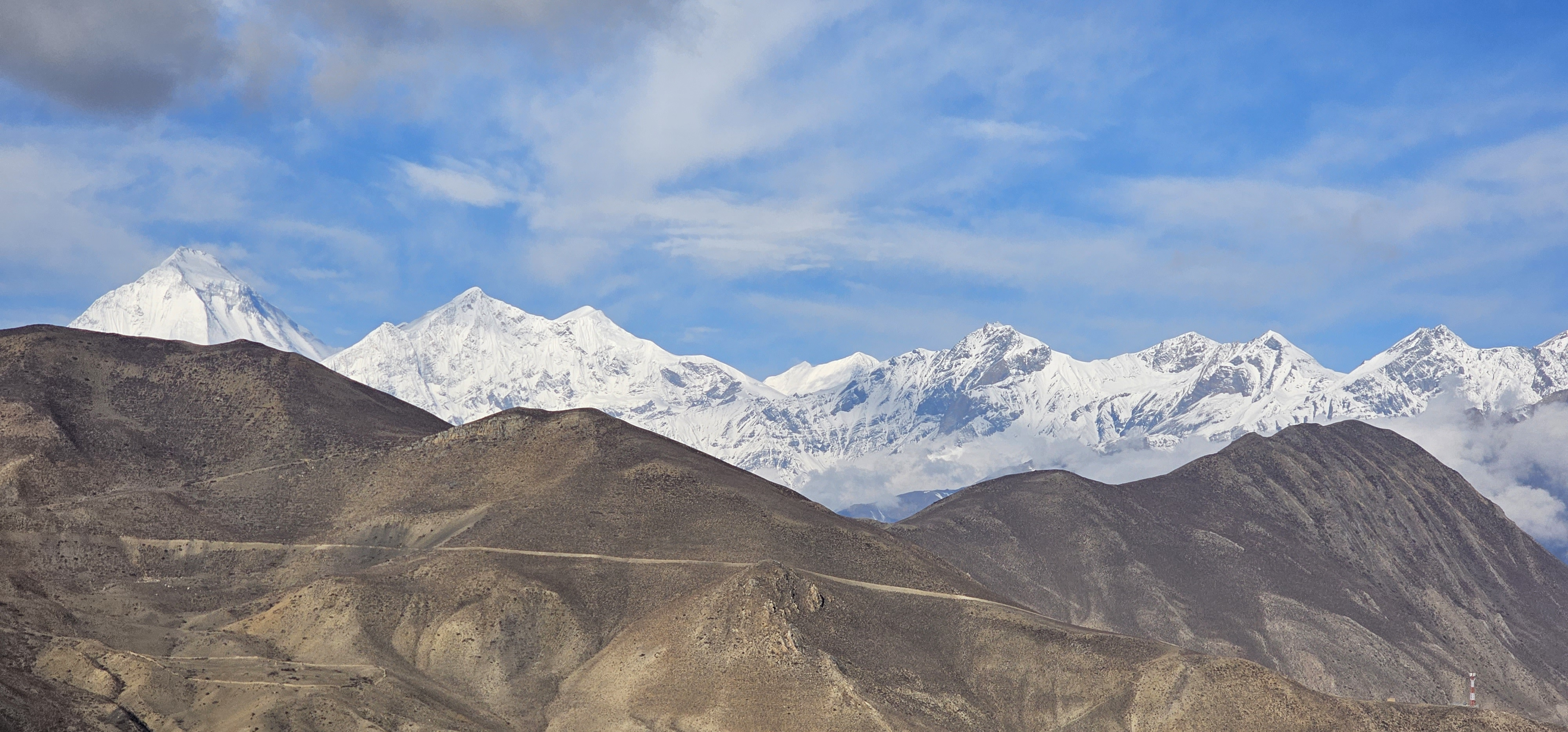
Tukuche Peak left of center

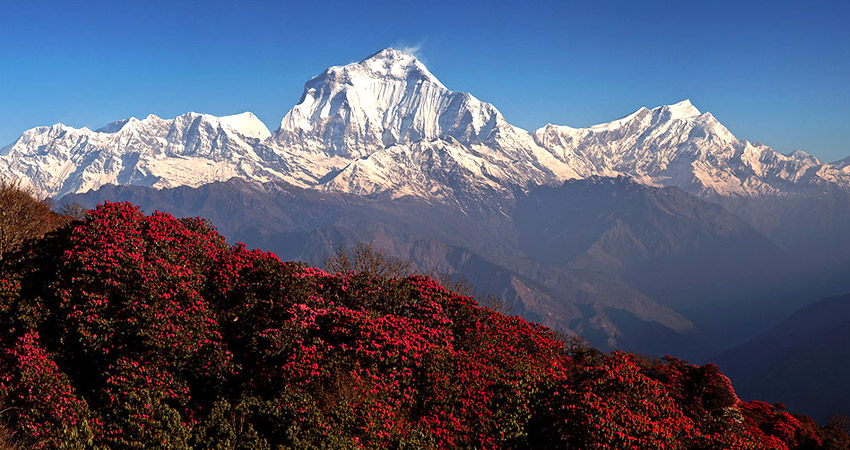
Dhaulagiri (center) and Tukuche Peak (right)

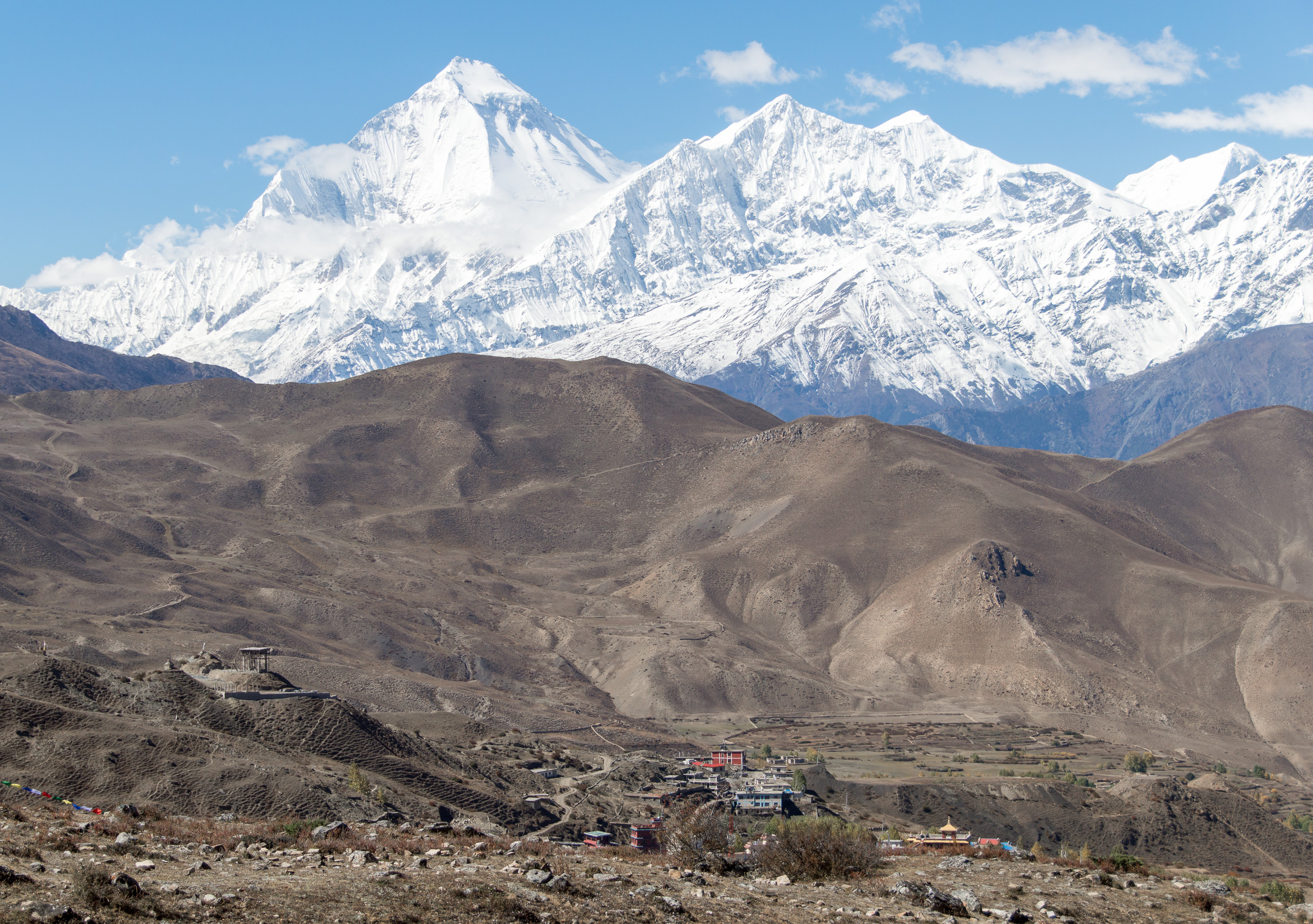
Dhaulagiri and Tukuche Peak

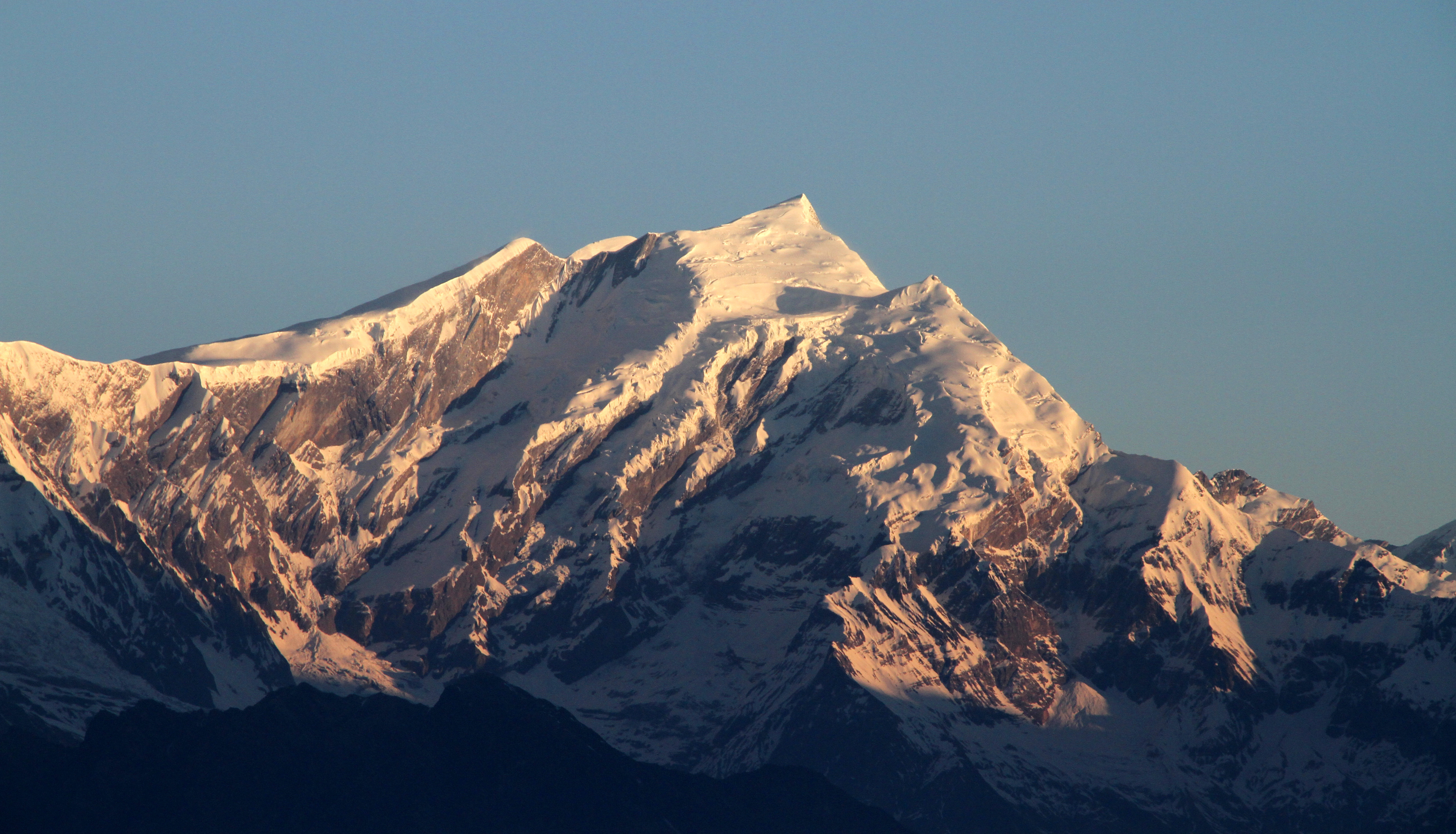
Tukuche Peak

== See also ==
- Geology of the Himalayas
