= Putha Hiunchuli =

Mountain in Nepal

- Dhaulagiri VII
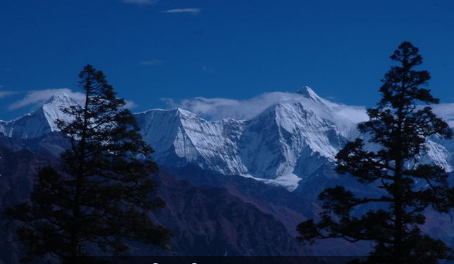

Highest point
- Elevation: 7,246 m (23,773 ft); Ranked 94th
- Prominence: 1,151 m (3,776 ft)
- Parent peak: Dhaulagiri
- Listing: Mountains of Nepal
- Coordinates: 28°44′52″N 83°08′53″E

Geography
- Location within Nepal
- Country: Nepal
- Provinces: Lumbini, Karnali and Gandaki
- Parent range: Dhaulagiri

Climbing
- First ascent: 1954 - J. O. M. Roberts and Ang Nyima Sherpa
- Easiest route: Alpine Peu difficile

Putha Hiunchuli (Dhaulagiri VII) is a mountain in Nepal and part of the Dhaulagiri Range. It lies at the west end of the Dhaulagiri II chain and is 7,246 metres (23,773 ft) high, making it the 94th highest mountain in the world. It was first climbed in 1954 by J. O. M. Roberts and Ang Nyima Sherpa.

In September 2024, two Guinness World Records were set during an expedition led by Neil Laughton. Laughton and Nima Kanchha Sherpa achieved the Guinness World Record for the highest altitude bicycle ride at the summit. Laughton and Tim Maw achieved a further Guinness World Record for the highest altitude playing a board/party game for a game of chess played at 6,216m (20,393ft).
