= Chunwang (place) =

Village development committee in Lumbini Province, Nepal

Chunwang चुनवाङ
- Village development committee
- Location in Nepal
- Coordinates: 28.54°N 82.58°E
- Country: Nepal
- Province: Lumbini Province
- District: Eastern Rukum District

Population (2011)
  - Total: 3,114
- Time zone: UTC+5:45 (Nepal Time)
- Area code: +977-88
- Website: www.ddcrukum.gov.np

Chunwang is a village development committee in Eastern Rukum District in Lumbini Province of western Nepal. At the time of the 1991 Nepal census it had a population of 3114 people living in 609 individual households.
