= J. O. M. Roberts =

20th century Himalayan mountaineer explorer

"Jimmy" Roberts
- Born: James Owen Merion Roberts; 21 September 1916; Gujarat, India
- Died: 1 November 1997 (aged 81); Pokhara, Nepal
- Military career
- Allegiance: United Kingdom
- Branch: British Army
- Rank: Lieutenant colonel
- Commands: 153 (Gurkha) Para Battalion
- Conflicts: Second World War
- Awards: LVO, MBE, MC

Lieutenant Colonel James Owen Merion Roberts MVO MBE MC (21 September 1916 – 1 November 1997) was one of the greatest Himalayan mountaineer-explorers of the twentieth century; a highly decorated British Army officer who achieved his greatest renown as "the father of trekking" in Nepal. His exploratory activities are comparable to those of Eric Shipton and Bill Tilman.

== Early years ==
Born in Gujarat, India to Henry and Helen Roberts, he spent his early life in India, where his father was a headmaster. After attending King's School, Canterbury and then the Royal Military College, Sandhurst, he was commissioned onto the Unattached List for the Indian Army in August 1936 as a 19-year-old subaltern to satisfy his ardent craving for mountaineering. After a probationary year attached to the 1st Battalion, the East Yorkshire Regiment in India, he was posted to the 1st battalion, 1st (King George V's Own) Gurkha Rifles in November 1937.

== Prewar climbing career ==
His first major expedition was the J. Waller-led attempt in 1938 on Masherbrum, 7821 metres, in the Karakoram: the weather was bad, the attempt was unsuccessful and J.B. Harrison and R.A. Hodgkin got severely frostbitten. Roberts himself suffered at high altitude and experienced mild frostbite.

He tried to join the post-monsoon 1939 Everest expedition led by Bill Tilman, but the attempt was called off. That year, he recorded the first of his many first ascents, that of Guan Nelda, 6303 metres, in the Spiti Himalaya. The ascent was remarkable for something which became a Roberts hallmark: he climbed without any other "sahib" for company, accompanied only by his Gurkhas. In this he was the true successor of the legendary Dr. A. M. Kellas who had climbed in the same fashion in Sikkim before 1914.

He was selected for the abortive 1940 Everest expedition.

The second major first ascent by Roberts was the 1941 climb of the 6431 metres (21,100 ft) peak locally called Dharmsura above the Tos Glacier of the Kullu Himalaya. He named it White Sail.

== Military career ==
After serving with the 1st battalion, 1st Gurkhas in North Africa, he returned to India and joined the 153 (Gurkha) Indian Para Battalion (part of the 50th Indian Parachute Brigade). He was dropped into North Burma on 3 July 1942 at the head of a small force to survey the Myitkyina area and then march 150 miles North to Fort Hertz. Roberts's party reached Fort Hertz in early August and discovered it was still in British hands. On 13 August, a party led by Capt. G.E.C. Newland of 153 Para dropped in on Fort Hertz with engineering supplies and the hitherto-unusable airfield at Fort Hertz was made operational by 20 August. Roberts and his men were extracted around that date. For this operation he was awarded the Military Cross.

As Major commanding 'A' Company of the 153 (Gurkha) Para Battalion, he took part in the 50th Para Brigade defence of Sangshak in 1944 against the Japanese thrust towards Kohima. The defence of Sangshak was portrayed by some in the Army High Command as not having been exemplary and Brigadier Hope-Thompson, in local command, took the punishment for that. However Slim, the 14th Army Commander personally sent a dispatch praising the bravery of those involved in the six days and nights of hand-to-hand fighting by a force outnumbered by 18 to 1. In fact the action is noted for the highest number of awards for gallantry issued by the Indian Army for a single action. Roberts fought well. The book about the battle by Harry Seaman has a photograph of him.

He led the first combat paratrooper jump in Southeast Asia on 1 May 1945, dropping with a battalion-size force at Elephant Point, South of Rangoon as part of the operation to capture that city, and was mentioned in Despatches.

After the war he transferred to the British Army's Brigade of Gurkhas and was posted in Malaya until 1954. He was appointed a Member of the Order of the British Empire in May 1955 for service in Malaya and made Member of the Royal Victorian Order in 1961.

He went to Kathmandu in 1958 as military attaché. He retired from the British Army in 1962 as a lieutenant colonel.

== Postwar climbing career highlights ==
- 1946 Eastern Karakorams, reconnaissance (sometimes abbreviated recce) of the Saser Kangri massif. First ascent of Lookout Peak, c. 6142 metres/20150, and Stundok Peak, c.6100 metres/20012 ft. His recce report was the basis on which the successful 1973 Indian expedition to Saser Kangri I, 7672 metres / 25170 feet, opted for a change of approach route from West to East that turned out to be the key to success.
- 1950 The most glorious chapter in Roberts' mountaineering career began with the opening up of Nepal in the 1950s. Roberts was asked to join a team led by Bill Tilman to the Annapurna massif in 1950. The expedition was 'ill-organised and badly led' and failed to climb even Annapurna IV, but Roberts saw a lot of the Nepalese mountainscape, seen earlier by only very few people like Toni Hagen and Oleg Polunin. The vale of Pokhara came as an Elysian discovery to Roberts. The same year saw the opening of the successful campaign against the 8000 metre peaks with the French achieving the ascent of Annapurna I.
- 1953 Roberts hoped to be invited to join the 1953 Everest team, but found his hopes fulfilled in a disappointing fashion, being asked to organise the transport of oxygen cylinders to Base Camp. Allowed to depart thereafter, Roberts put the time to good use, exploring three valleys lying South and South-west of Everest, and making the first ascent of Mera, 6476 metres (other altitudes exist) on 20 May 1953 with Sen Tensing. In recent times this climb has been downgraded to the first ascent of Mera Central (6461 metres) in some places.
- 1954 First ascent of Putha Hiunchuli, 7246 metres, in the Dhaulagiri group with Ang Nyima on Nov.11 during recce of the massif with G. Lorimer.
- 1956 Reconnaissance of Machapuchare
- 1957 Leader of expedition to Machapuchare (The Fishes' Tail), 6993 metres, the only officially recorded attempt. On 2 June the summit team of A D M Cox and C W F Noyce stopped 'some 50 metres below the North summit' due to lack of time, so the peak is regarded as unclimbed. No further expeditions are allowed to this superbly beautiful peak which is considered holy: apparently Roberts lobbied the Nepal Govt.to have this peak declared out of bounds! Fluted Peak (21800 ft) was first climbed by this expedition.
- 1960 Leader, of the Army Mountaineering Association Annapurna II expedition, 7937 metres: first ascent achieved. This was Chris Bonington's first major Himalayan summit.
- 1962 Leader, Dhaulagiri IV, 7660 metres, expedition: reached 6400 metres on masking peak Dhaulagiri VI.
- 1963 Transport Officer, American Mount Everest Expedition
- 1965 Joint Leader, Dhaulagiri IV expedition
- 1971 Joint leader with Norman Dyhrenfurth of the International Everest Expedition that ended in disaster and acrimony after the death of Indian member H. V. Bahuguna on the West Ridge.

A lifelong votary of 'small party mountaineering', particularly to unexplored areas and mountains, Roberts disliked the repeated attempts on Everest. "The big "first" was taken for ever in 1953", he wrote in 1979,"and other firsts must now be sought - the first ascent by a woman, without oxygen, by such and such a nationality, and, a big prize to come, the first ascent in elastic-sided boots." However, he was encouraged by a renewed interest in small expeditions: "...there are signs that a renaissance of small party mountaineering (even to the highest summits) is on the way."

In 1995 he was given the Back Award (instituted 1888) by the Royal Geographical Society.

Roberts founded the first trekking and mountaineering outfit Mountain Travel Nepal in 1964 to offer the opportunity for wealthy travellers to enjoy the experience of trekking or climbing in Nepal without problems. His trained Gurkha/Sherpa teams, took care of transportation, camping and local liaison, leaving trekkers free to enjoy the thrills. The first trek he managed was one by three elderly ladies to Everest Base Camp in 1965. He is known and revered as "the father of trekking in Nepal".

He acted as bird-collector for the British Museum during the 1950 expedition, and maintained an aviary in Pokhara where he bred pheasants. He wrote a brief outline of his life in August 1997 as a two-part blog called The Himalayan Odyssey on the mountaintravelnepal.com website just before he died at Pokhara on 1 November 1997. His ashes were scattered in the Seti Khola which flows down from the "Fishtail" mountain.
