= Chura Kang =

Mountain on the border between Bhutan and Tibet

- Location within Bhutan

Highest point
- Elevation: 6,650 m (21,820 ft)
- Coordinates: 28°03′03.26″N 90°45′06.00″E

Geography
- Location: Bhutan

Chura Kang is a mountain in the main Himalayan range, located on the border between Bhutan and the autonomous region of Tibet in the People's Republic of China.

== Location ==
The peak stands at an elevation of 6,650 m (21,820 ft) above sea level. Rising 5.6 kilometers to the northeast is the similarly towering Bechang Kangri. To the west, the primary crest of the Himalayas leads to Melunghi Kang, which reaches a height of 6,902 m (22,644 ft) and is situated approximately 22 kilometers away. Just under 23 kilometers to the north-northwest lies the mountain massif of Kula Kangri, towering at 7,538 m (24,731 ft). Extending along the southern slope of Chura Kang is the Chubda Glacier. This glacier terminates at the glacier-fed Chubda Tsho lake, which drains through the Mela Chhu and Bumthang Chhu rivers.

On the northeastern slope, the Bailang Glacier is positioned, providing sustenance to the glacier-fed Bailang Tso lake. Located on the northwestern side is the Angge Glacier. This glacier feeds into the Ngangge Glacier, culminating in the glacier-fed Ngangge Tso lake. The northern glaciers are emptied by the Xung Qu, a right tributary of the Lhobrak Chhu river. In recent years, the glaciers have been steadily retreating, while concurrently, the glacier-fed lakes have been expanding.

== Climbing history ==
No ascents of Chura Kang are documented.
