= Ngadi Chuli =

Mountain in Nepal

- Harka Gurung Chuli
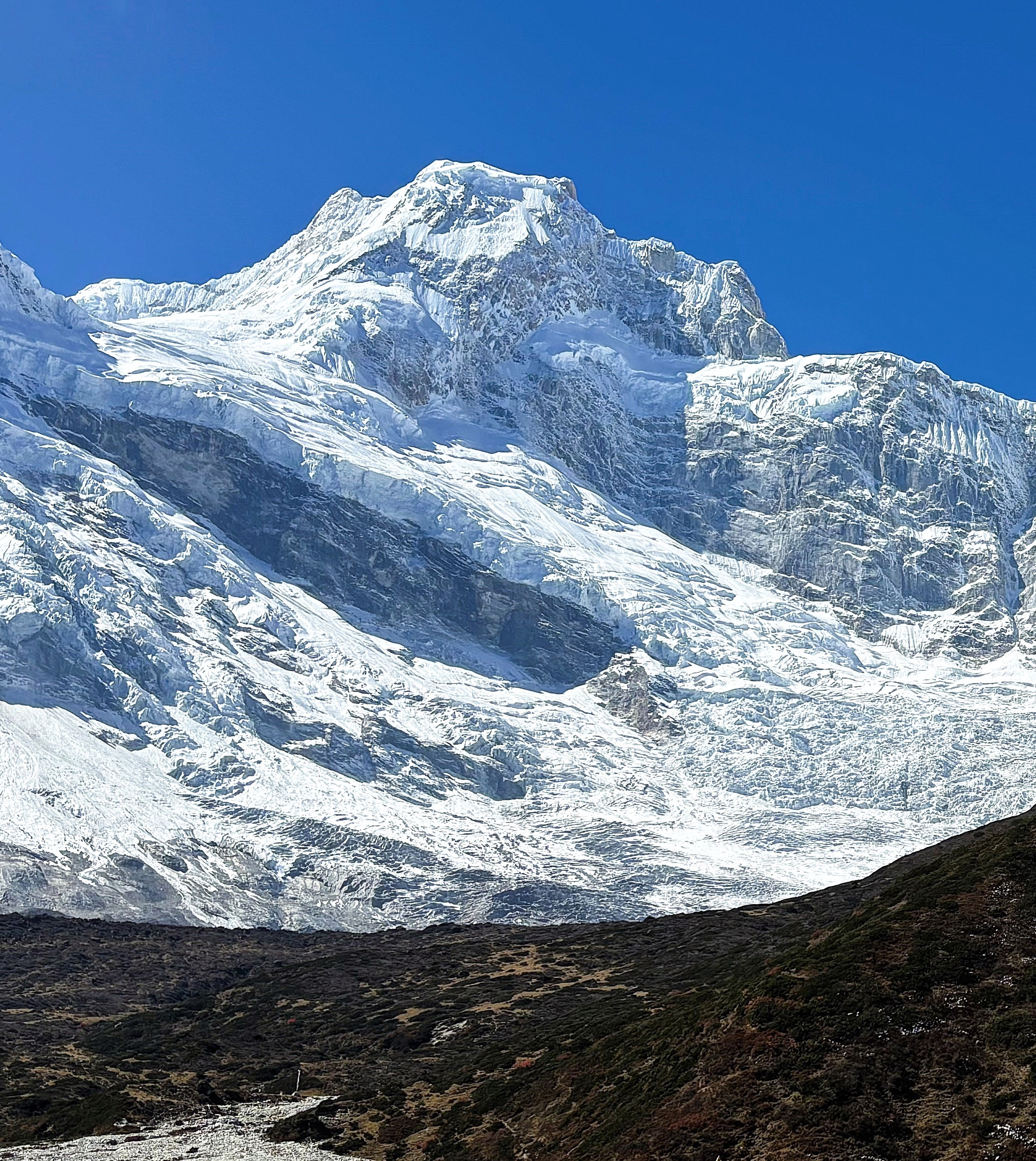
- Northeast aspect

Highest point
- Elevation: 7,871 m (25,823 ft); Ranked 20th
- Prominence: 1,020 m (3,350 ft)
- Listing: Mountains of Nepal
- Coordinates: 28°30′12″N 84°34′07″E

Geography
- The major peaks (not mountains) above 7,500 m (24,600 ft) height in Himalayas, rank identified in Himalayas alone (not the world). Legend: 1：Mount Everest; 2：Kangchenjunga; 3：Lhotse; 4：Yalung Kang, Kanchenjunga West; 5：Makalu; 6：Kangchenjunga South; 7：Kangchenjunga Central; 8：Cho Oyu; 9：Dhaulagiri; 10：Manaslu (Kutang); 11：Nanga Parbat (Diamer); 12：Annapurna; 13：Shishapangma (Shishasbangma, Xixiabangma); 14：Manaslu East; 15：Annapurna East Peak; 16： Gyachung Kang; 17：Annapurna II; 18：Tenzing Peak (Ngojumba Kang, Ngozumpa Kang, Ngojumba Ri); 19：Kangbachen; 20：Himalchuli (Himal Chuli); 21：Ngadi Chuli (Peak 29, Dakura, Dakum, Dunapurna); 22：Nuptse (Nubtse); 23：Nanda Devi; 24：Chomo Lonzo (Chomolonzo, Chomolönzo, Chomo Lönzo, Jomolönzo, Lhamalangcho); 25：Namcha Barwa (Namchabarwa); 26：Zemu Kang (Zemu Gap Peak); 27：Kamet; 28：Dhaulagiri II; 29：Ngojumba Kang II; 30：Dhaulagiri III; 31：Kumbhakarna Mountain (Mount Kumbhakarna, Jannu); 32：Gurla Mandhata (Naimona'nyi, Namu Nan); 33：Hillary Peak (Ngojumba Kang III); 34：Molamenqing (Phola Gangchen); 35：Dhaulagiri IV; 36：Annapurna Fang; 37：Silver Crag; 38：Kangbachen Southwest; 39：Gangkhar Puensum (Gangkar Punsum); 40：Annapurna III; 41：Himalchuli West; 42：Annapurna IV; 43：Kula Kangri; 44：Liankang Kangri (Gangkhar Puensum North, Liangkang Kangri); 45：Ngadi Chuli South
- Country: Nepal
- Parent range: Mansiri Himal

Climbing
- First ascent: 19 October 1970 by Hiroshi Watanabe and Lhakpa Tsering or 8 May 1979 by Ryszard Gajewski and Maciej Pawlikowski
- Easiest route: Snow/ice climb

Ngadi Chuli (also known as Harka Gurung Chuli, Peak 29, Dakura, Dakum, or Dunapurna) is a mountain in the Mansiri Himal (or Manaslu Himal), also known as the Gurkha Massif, in Nepal. With an elevation of 7,871 metres (25,823 ft) above sea level, it is the 20th-highest mountain on Earth.

== Features ==
Flanked by Manaslu to the north and Himalchuli to the southeast, Ngadi Chuli is the middlemost and third-highest mountain of the massif. Though shorter and somewhat rounder than its immediate neighbors when viewed from the more common eastern approaches, it is difficult to access due to snow danger and being flanked by active glaciers in all directions. The steep western side, recessed behind outlying peaks and glacial valleys, rises over 3,200 metres (10,500 ft) above the Thulagi glacier. It is crowned by a steep, technical rock headwall with five summits across its length; only the highest of these is named.

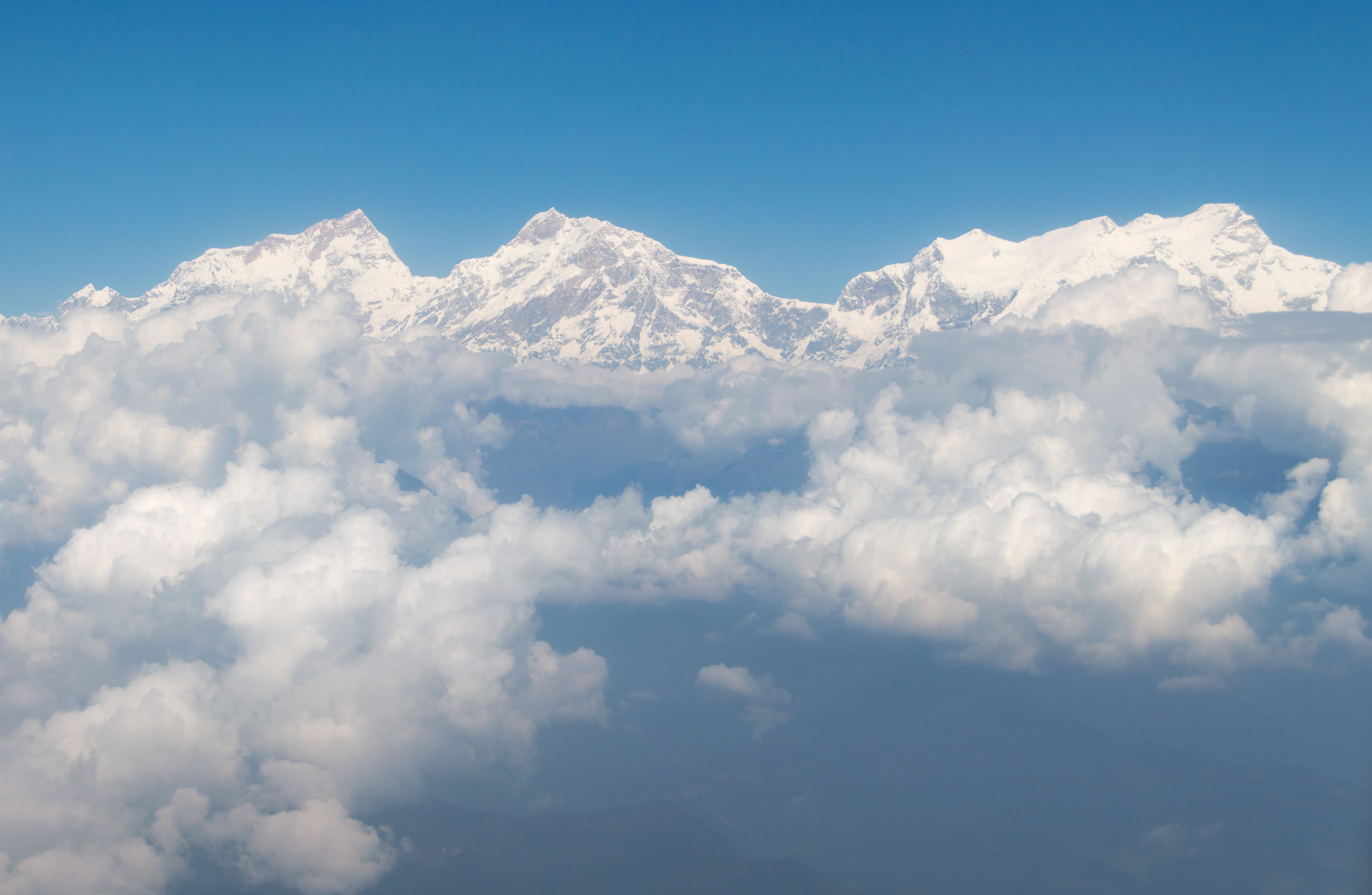
Left to right: Manaslu, Ngadi Chuli, Himalchuli

== Climbing history ==
Despite its top 20 height, Ngadi Chuli has only been climbed once or twice. The probable first ascent occurred in 1970, when Hiroshi Watanabe and Sherpa Lhakpa Tsering, members of a Japanese expedition, climbed the east ridge and face. They left their camp V, at about 7,500 metres, for a summit attempt. About 70 m below the summit they disappeared out of sight for nearly two hours at 1:15 PM. On their return, after descending a difficult snow ridge, they suffered a fatal fall down an ice wall, from c. 7,600 m nearly down to camp 4 at 6,900 m, where their climbing partners observed their fall. Neither their camera nor Watanabe's ice-axe, to which pennants would have been attached had they reached the summit, survived the fall, so that no conclusive evidence that they reached the summit has ever been found. In order to achieve a confirmed ascent of the mountain, the Japanese organized three more expeditions, in 1974, 1975 and 1978, but these all failed, with the last of these incurring the avalanche deaths of three climbers on the southwestern side of the mountain.

The first confirmed ascent was in 1979 by the Polish climbers Ryszard Gajewski and Maciej Pawlikowski via the West buttress, involving some class V rock climbing at great height.

A British Army Mountaineering Association expedition attempted Peak 29 in the post-monsoon 1982 season. Adverse weather and logistical problems caused by the Falklands War, however, prevented the expedition from climbing above 20,000 feet (6,100 m).

As of 2014, no further attempts have been made on the mountain since the British expedition in 1982.

== Timeline ==
- 1961 First reconnaissance by Japanese climbers.
- 1969 Third Japanese attempt reached 7350 m.
- 1970 Probable first ascent, via the east ridge and face.
- 1978 Three climbers die in an avalanche during the seventh Japanese attempt.
- 1979 First confirmed ascent, by a Polish expedition.
