= Zemu Gap Peak =

Peak in the Himalayas

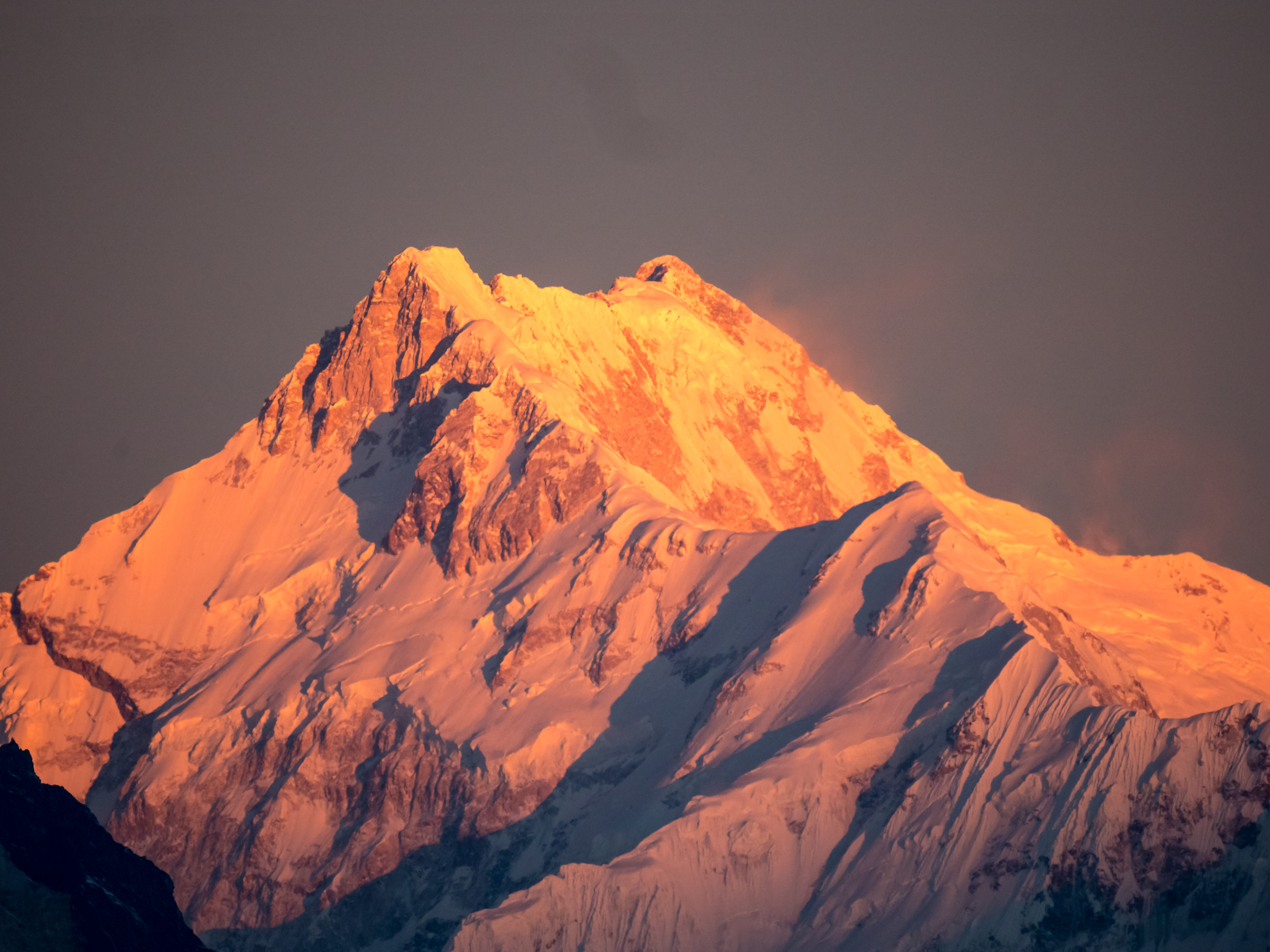
- Zemu Gap Peak (bottom right) below Kangchenjunga

Highest point
- Elevation: 7,780 m (25,520 ft)
- Prominence: 140 m (460 ft)
- Coordinates: 27°41′14″N 88°10′26″E

Geography
- The major peaks (not mountains) above 7,500 m (24,600 ft) height in Himalayas, rank identified in Himalayas alone (not the world). Legend: 1：Mount Everest; 2：Kangchenjunga; 3：Lhotse; 4：Yalung Kang, Kanchenjunga West; 5：Makalu; 6：Kangchenjunga South; 7：Kangchenjunga Central; 8：Cho Oyu; 9：Dhaulagiri; 10：Manaslu (Kutang); 11：Nanga Parbat (Diamer); 12：Annapurna; 13：Shishapangma (Shishasbangma, Xixiabangma); 14：Manaslu East; 15：Annapurna East Peak; 16： Gyachung Kang; 17：Annapurna II; 18：Tenzing Peak (Ngojumba Kang, Ngozumpa Kang, Ngojumba Ri); 19：Kangbachen; 20：Himalchuli (Himal Chuli); 21：Ngadi Chuli (Peak 29, Dakura, Dakum, Dunapurna); 22：Nuptse (Nubtse); 23：Nanda Devi; 24：Chomo Lonzo (Chomolonzo, Chomolönzo, Chomo Lönzo, Jomolönzo, Lhamalangcho); 25：Namcha Barwa (Namchabarwa); 26：Zemu Kang (Zemu Gap Peak); 27：Kamet; 28：Dhaulagiri II; 29：Ngojumba Kang II; 30：Dhaulagiri III; 31：Kumbhakarna Mountain (Mount Kumbhakarna, Jannu); 32：Gurla Mandhata (Naimona'nyi, Namu Nan); 33：Hillary Peak (Ngojumba Kang III); 34：Molamenqing (Phola Gangchen); 35：Dhaulagiri IV; 36：Annapurna Fang; 37：Silver Crag; 38：Kangbachen Southwest; 39：Gangkhar Puensum (Gangkar Punsum); 40：Annapurna III; 41：Himalchuli West; 42：Annapurna IV; 43：Kula Kangri; 44：Liankang Kangri (Gangkhar Puensum North, Liangkang Kangri); 45：Ngadi Chuli South
- Location: Sikkim, India
- Parent range: Himalayas

Climbing
- First ascent: unclimbed

Zemu Gap Peak or Zemu Peak (7,780 m or 25,520 ft) is a peak on a high ridge running east of the south summit of Kangchenjunga in the Himalayas. It is located in Sikkim, India

It is one of the highest unclimbed named peaks of the world. There have been no known attempts to climb this peak.

A number of expeditions in the 1920s and 1930s investigated the peak and made early, ascent attempts. In 1925, N. Tombazi, a Greek photographer, claimed to have reached the summit via the South, but as no photographs were taken at the summit, the attempt was disputed. At the same time, Tombazi also claimed to have made some early sightings of the Yeti while climbing in the region. British explorer Bill Tilman made a traverse of the Zemu Gap in 1938.

Mountaineering in Sikkim was abundant during the time of British India, with most climbing activity in the region taking place between 1929 and 1939. In the years since, the saddle Zemu Gap (5,861 m or 19,229 ft) has been rarely attempted by climbers, partly due to its remoteness and difficult approach, with wide crevasses preventing passage.

In 2008, a British team consisting of Adrian O’Connor, Colin Knowles and Jerzy Wieczorek that was attempting to reach the saddle Zemu Gap from the south was prevented by icefall and poor weather.

In December 2011, an Indian expedition consisting of Thendup Sherpa, Anindya Mukherjee, Pemba Sherpa, Phurtemba Sherpa and Gyalzen Sherpa made the first documented successful ascent of the saddle Zemu Gap over the course of a 16-day expedition. On 15 December, Thendup Sherpa, Anindya Mukherjee and Pemba Sherpa summited Zemu Gap after a six-hour climb from camp 3.

In 2012, The Himalayan Club awarded the inaugural Jagdish Nanavati Award for Excellence in Mountaineering for the achievement.

== See also ==
- Zemu Glacier
- Bill Tilman
