= Tenzing Peak =

Mountain peak in the Himalayas

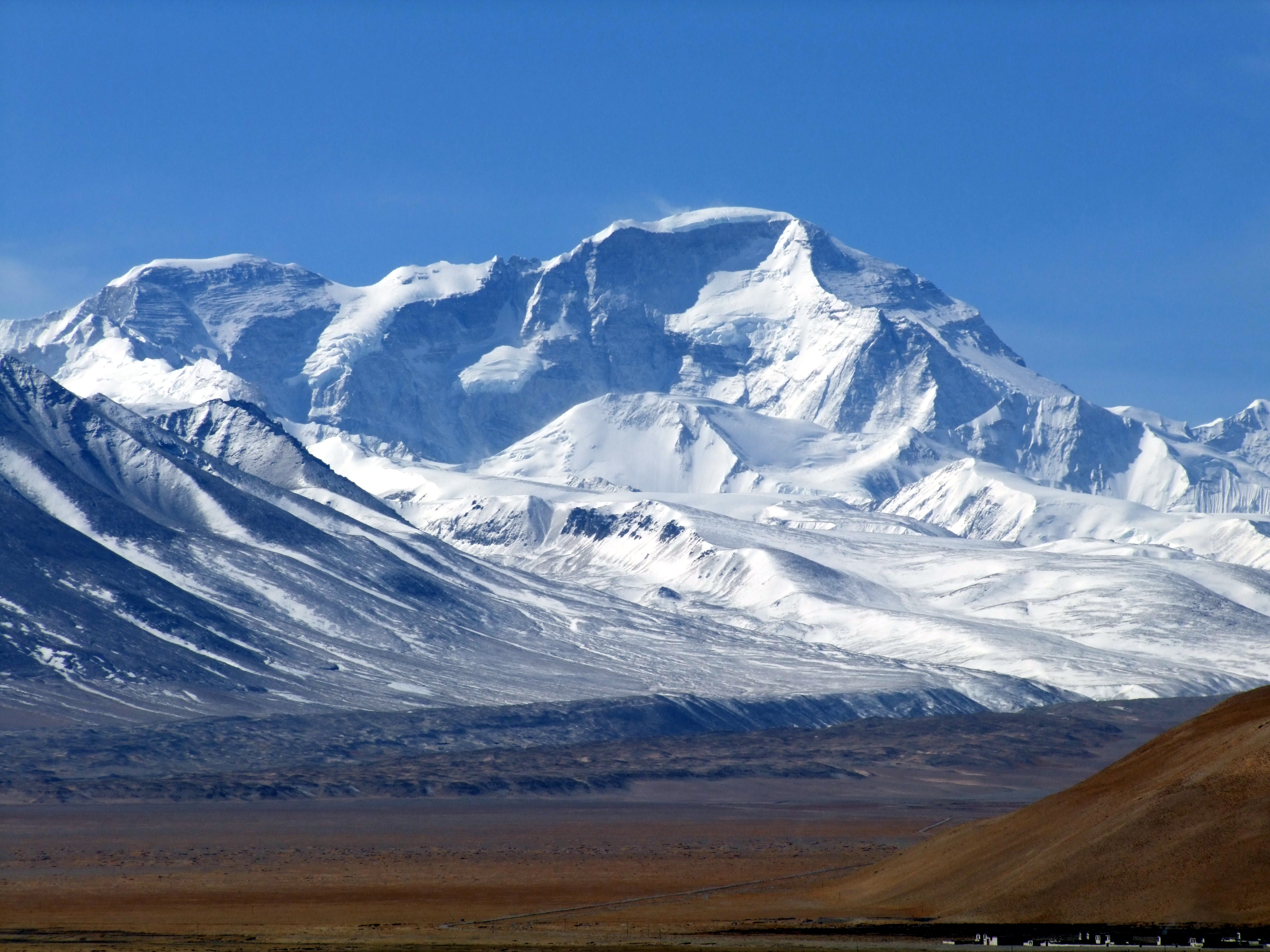
- The North Face of Cho Oyu from Tingri in Tibet. Tenzing Peak is the peak on the left.

Highest point
- Elevation: 7,916 m (25,971 ft)
- Prominence: 216 m (709 ft)
- Listing: Mountains of Nepal; Mountains of China
- Coordinates: 28°06′21″N 86°41′13″E

Geography
- The major peaks (not mountains) above 7,500 m (24,600 ft) height in Himalayas, rank identified in Himalayas alone (not the world). Legend: 1：Mount Everest; 2：Kangchenjunga; 3：Lhotse; 4：Yalung Kang, Kanchenjunga West; 5：Makalu; 6：Kangchenjunga South; 7：Kangchenjunga Central; 8：Cho Oyu; 9：Dhaulagiri; 10：Manaslu (Kutang); 11：Nanga Parbat (Diamer); 12：Annapurna; 13：Shishapangma (Shishasbangma, Xixiabangma); 14：Manaslu East; 15：Annapurna East Peak; 16： Gyachung Kang; 17：Annapurna II; 18：Tenzing Peak (Ngojumba Kang, Ngozumpa Kang, Ngojumba Ri); 19：Kangbachen; 20：Himalchuli (Himal Chuli); 21：Ngadi Chuli (Peak 29, Dakura, Dakum, Dunapurna); 22：Nuptse (Nubtse); 23：Nanda Devi; 24：Chomo Lonzo (Chomolonzo, Chomolönzo, Chomo Lönzo, Jomolönzo, Lhamalangcho); 25：Namcha Barwa (Namchabarwa); 26：Zemu Kang (Zemu Gap Peak); 27：Kamet; 28：Dhaulagiri II; 29：Ngojumba Kang II; 30：Dhaulagiri III; 31：Kumbhakarna Mountain (Mount Kumbhakarna, Jannu); 32：Gurla Mandhata (Naimona'nyi, Namu Nan); 33：Hillary Peak (Ngojumba Kang III); 34：Molamenqing (Phola Gangchen); 35：Dhaulagiri IV; 36：Annapurna Fang; 37：Silver Crag; 38：Kangbachen Southwest; 39：Gangkhar Puensum (Gangkar Punsum); 40：Annapurna III; 41：Himalchuli West; 42：Annapurna IV; 43：Kula Kangri; 44：Liankang Kangri (Gangkhar Puensum North, Liangkang Kangri); 45：Ngadi Chuli South
- Countries: Nepal and China
- Region: Tibet (China)
- Parent range: Himalayas

Climbing
- First ascent: April 24, 1965 by Naomi Uemura and Pemba Tenzing

Tenzing Peak is the name which has been proposed by the Government of Nepal for a 7,916-metre (25,971 ft) peak in the Himalayas in honour of Tenzing Norgay, who made the first ascent of Everest with Edmund Hillary in 1953. It is also known variously as Ngojumba Kang, Ngozumpa Kang and Ngojumba Ri.

In September 2013 a government panel recommended that two mountains on the ridge between Cho Oyu and Gyachung Kang be called Hillary Peak and Tenzing Peak as part of a batch of new summits that would be opened to climbers in 2014. It is in fact a satellite peak of Cho Oyu, which is 2.64 km (1.64 mi) to its west–south–west.

It was first climbed on 24 April 1965 by Naomi Uemura and Pemba Tenzing as part of a Japanese expedition from the Alpine Club of Meiji University.

The subsidiary peaks of Ngojumba Kang are to its east Ngojumba Kang II at 7,743 m (25,404 ft) at 2.16 km (1.34 mi) distance at 28°06′22″N 86°42′22″E and Ngojumba Kang III (Hillary Peak) at 7,681 m (25,200 ft) at 2.81 km (1.75 mi) distance at 28°06′24″N 86°42′46″E. (Note: The locations of the peaks named Tenzing and Hillary were initially unclear. The height given by Nepalese government sources of Hillary Peak at 7681 m is used here. The coordinates published by the Nepalese government later in 2014 for Hillary Peak at 28°06′24″N 86°42′58″E best matches Ngojumba Kang III, rather than Ngojumba Kang II as assigned by some.)
