= Annapurna III =

Mountain in Nepal

- Annapurna III

Highest point
- Elevation: 7,555 m (24,787 ft); Ranked 42nd
- Prominence: 703 m (2,306 ft)
- Parent peak: Annapurna I
- Isolation: 14.04 km (8.72 mi)
- Listing: List of mountains in Nepal
- Coordinates: 28°35′8″N 83°59′22″E

Geography
- The major peaks (not mountains) above 7,500 m (24,600 ft) height in Himalayas, rank identified in Himalayas alone (not the world). Legend: 1：Mount Everest; 2：Kangchenjunga; 3：Lhotse; 4：Yalung Kang, Kanchenjunga West; 5：Makalu; 6：Kangchenjunga South; 7：Kangchenjunga Central; 8：Cho Oyu; 9：Dhaulagiri; 10：Manaslu (Kutang); 11：Nanga Parbat (Diamer); 12：Annapurna; 13：Shishapangma (Shishasbangma, Xixiabangma); 14：Manaslu East; 15：Annapurna East Peak; 16： Gyachung Kang; 17：Annapurna II; 18：Tenzing Peak (Ngojumba Kang, Ngozumpa Kang, Ngojumba Ri); 19：Kangbachen; 20：Himalchuli (Himal Chuli); 21：Ngadi Chuli (Peak 29, Dakura, Dakum, Dunapurna); 22：Nuptse (Nubtse); 23：Nanda Devi; 24：Chomo Lonzo (Chomolonzo, Chomolönzo, Chomo Lönzo, Jomolönzo, Lhamalangcho); 25：Namcha Barwa (Namchabarwa); 26：Zemu Kang (Zemu Gap Peak); 27：Kamet; 28：Dhaulagiri II; 29：Ngojumba Kang II; 30：Dhaulagiri III; 31：Kumbhakarna Mountain (Mount Kumbhakarna, Jannu); 32：Gurla Mandhata (Naimona'nyi, Namu Nan); 33：Hillary Peak (Ngojumba Kang III); 34：Molamenqing (Phola Gangchen); 35：Dhaulagiri IV; 36：Annapurna Fang; 37：Silver Crag; 38：Kangbachen Southwest; 39：Gangkhar Puensum (Gangkar Punsum); 40：Annapurna III; 41：Himalchuli West; 42：Annapurna IV; 43：Kula Kangri; 44：Liankang Kangri (Gangkhar Puensum North, Liangkang Kangri); 45：Ngadi Chuli South
- Location: Annapurna Massif, Gandaki Province, Nepal
- Parent range: Annapurna Himal

Climbing
- First ascent: 6 May 1961
- Easiest route: snow/ice climb

Annapurna III (Nepali: अन्नपूर्ण ३) is a mountain in the Annapurna mountain range located in Nepal, and at 7,555 metres (24,787 ft) tall, it is the 42nd highest mountain in the world and the third highest peak of the Annapurna mountain range (Annapurna Fang is technically taller at 7,647 metres (25,089 ft), but lacks the prominence to be considered a fully independent peak).

== Features ==
Located directly south of Manang village, Annapurna III is the easternmost peak within the Annapurna Sanctuary, though not the range itself. To the west, it is connected to the slightly shorter Gangapurna by a col at 6,860 metres (22,510 ft), with a glacial cirque beneath the North and East Faces of these respective mountains emptying out via an icefall to Gangapurna Lake in the Marsyangdi river valley. The southern aspects of Annapurna III are accessible only through steep valleys and are renowned by climbers for their technical difficulty, most famously the spur known as the "Southeast Ridge", which rises steeply from the gorge of the Seti River to connect to the South Ridge proper.

== History ==
It was first ascended 6 May 1961 by an Indian expedition led by Capt. Mohan Singh Kohli via the Northeast Face. The summit party comprised Mohan Kohli, Sonam Gyatso, and Sonam Girmi. A Japanese women's expedition led by Junko Tabei succeeded in putting the first women on top on 19 May 1970.

Several teams had attempted to summit Annapurna III via the southeast ridge, with all efforts prior to 2021 ending in failure. The first attempt up this ridge was in 1981 by Nick Colton and Tim Leach, who reached about 1000 feet below the peak before turning around. Twice in 2010, Pete Benson, Nick Bullock, and Matt Helliker unsuccessfully attempted the southeast ridge. Their first attempt started at the southeast pillar, and the second attempt started at the east ridge where the team began by flying a helicopter into basecamp to save time. In 2016, David Lama filmed a documentary of his unsuccessful attempt up the southeast ridge along with Hansjörg Auer and Alex Blümel winning the UIAA awarded the Best Climbing Film.

The first ascent of the southeast ridge ascent was made on 6th November 2021 by Mykyta Balabanov, Vyacheslav Polezhayko and Mykhailo Fomin. The route was considered one of the unfinished challenges in the Himalayas and is about 2,800-3,000 metres on a vertical face whose crux emerges in the form of a technically demanding chimney, shown in the video of the 2016 attempt. It was the second attempt by this Ukrainian expedition, the first one being in 2019. They won a "Special Jury Award" at the 2022 Piolet d'Or for their ascent.
