= Yalung Kang =

Minor summit of Kangchenjunga in Nepal

- Yalungkar, Kangchenjunga West
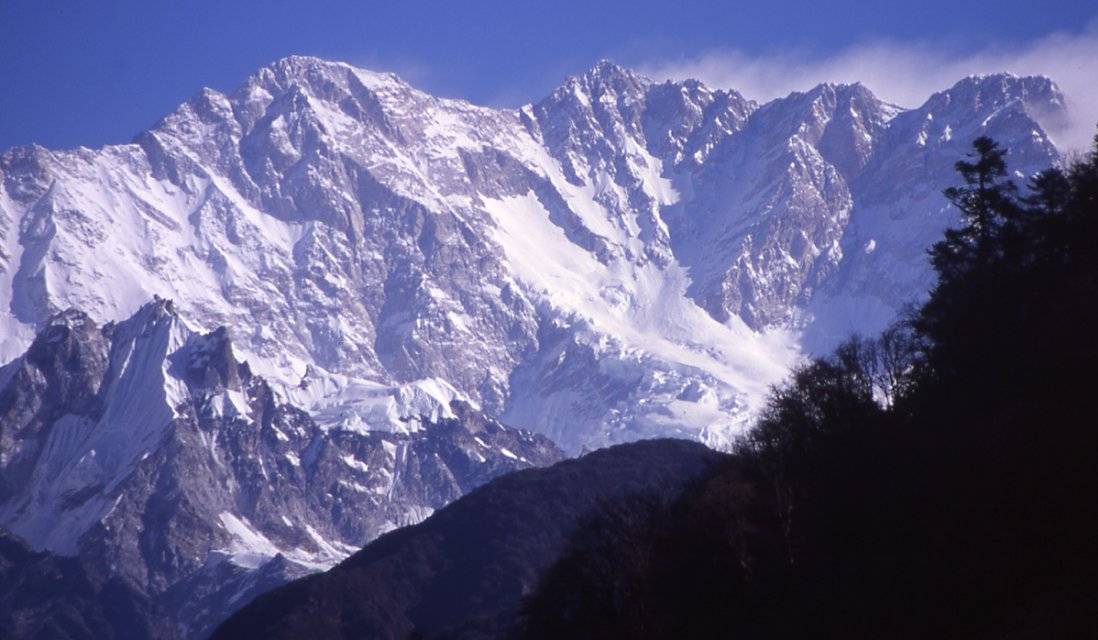
- Yalung Kang (leftmost peak) from the south face of the Kangchenjunga massif

Highest point
- Elevation: 8,505 m (27,904 ft)
- Prominence: 135 m (443 ft)
- Parent peak: Kangchenjunga
- Isolation: 1.16 km (0.72 mi)
- Listing: List of mountains in Nepal
- Coordinates: 27°42′19″N 88°08′09″E

Naming
- Native name: Nepali: यालुङ हिमाल

Geography
- The major peaks (not mountains) above 7,500 m (24,600 ft) height in Himalayas, rank identified in Himalayas alone (not the world). Legend: 1：Mount Everest; 2：Kangchenjunga; 3：Lhotse; 4：Yalung Kang, Kanchenjunga West; 5：Makalu; 6：Kangchenjunga South; 7：Kangchenjunga Central; 8：Cho Oyu; 9：Dhaulagiri; 10：Manaslu (Kutang); 11：Nanga Parbat (Diamer); 12：Annapurna; 13：Shishapangma (Shishasbangma, Xixiabangma); 14：Manaslu East; 15：Annapurna East Peak; 16： Gyachung Kang; 17：Annapurna II; 18：Tenzing Peak (Ngojumba Kang, Ngozumpa Kang, Ngojumba Ri); 19：Kangbachen; 20：Himalchuli (Himal Chuli); 21：Ngadi Chuli (Peak 29, Dakura, Dakum, Dunapurna); 22：Nuptse (Nubtse); 23：Nanda Devi; 24：Chomo Lonzo (Chomolonzo, Chomolönzo, Chomo Lönzo, Jomolönzo, Lhamalangcho); 25：Namcha Barwa (Namchabarwa); 26：Zemu Kang (Zemu Gap Peak); 27：Kamet; 28：Dhaulagiri II; 29：Ngojumba Kang II; 30：Dhaulagiri III; 31：Kumbhakarna Mountain (Mount Kumbhakarna, Jannu); 32：Gurla Mandhata (Naimona'nyi, Namu Nan); 33：Hillary Peak (Ngojumba Kang III); 34：Molamenqing (Phola Gangchen); 35：Dhaulagiri IV; 36：Annapurna Fang; 37：Silver Crag; 38：Kangbachen Southwest; 39：Gangkhar Puensum (Gangkar Punsum); 40：Annapurna III; 41：Himalchuli West; 42：Annapurna IV; 43：Kula Kangri; 44：Liankang Kangri (Gangkhar Puensum North, Liangkang Kangri); 45：Ngadi Chuli South
- Location: Taplejung District, Koshi Province, Nepal
- Parent range: Himalayas

Climbing
- First ascent: May 14,1973 by Yutaka Ageta and Takao Matsuda

Yalung Kang (Yalungkar or alternatively Kangchenjunga West) (Limbu: ᤕᤠᤗᤢᤱᤗᤢᤱᤔᤠ, Yallunglungma in Limbu) (Nepali: यालुङ हिमाल, Yalung Himal in Nepali) is a 8,505 m high minor summit of the Kangchenjunga massif found in the Himalayan range.

The peak lies 1.16 km (0.72 mi) west of Kanchenjunga's main summit in Taplejung, Nepal. The mountain range continues west to the final subsidiary peak of the massif, Kangbachen.

While Yalung Kang has long been recognized by geographers to be over 8,000 m, there has been hesitation to consider Yalung Kang the 15th eight-thousander. At 8,505 m (27,904 ft) high, Yalung Kang would be the fifth highest mountain on earth if it were an independent peak, only eleven meters shorter than Lhotse.

In 2014, Nepal officially recognized Yalung Kang as an independent peak and opened it for climbing.

Despite Nepal's recognition, the International Climbing and Mountaineering Federation (UIAA) refuses to recognize Yalung Kang as an independent peak. Its lack of recognition as an independent peak has led Yalung Kang to be scarcely climbed when compared to Kangchenjunga's central summit.

As of 2024, there have been only 22 recorded expeditions to Yalung Kang, compared to 201 on Kanchenjunga, according to the Himalayan Database. 12 of these have had successful summits, and five expeditions have experienced a fatality (22%), making it the most dangerous of the Kangchenjunga peaks.

== Climbing history ==
The first successful summit of Yalung Kang was by the Kyoto University Yalung Khang Expedition in 1973. Two members of the 16 member expedition team reached the summit via the Southwest ridge, Yutaka Ageta and Takao Matsuda. Matusda was lost on the descent, all that could be found was part of a broken ice ax.

=== 1980s ===
In 1980, Sergio Hugo Saldano Meneses from the University of Mexico Himalayas Expedition made the first successful summit of Yalung Kang without bottled oxygen, climbing via the SE face. He, along with Alfonso Medina and Chowang Renzi Sherpa, were lost on the descent.

In 1984, Laurence de la Ferrière made the first successful female ascent of Yalung Kang.

On April 22, 1985, Tomo Česen and Borut Bergant, members of a Slovenian climbing expedition claimed to have made the first successful summit of Yalung Kang via the North. The two climbed without supplemental oxygen, unfortunately, Bergant was lost on the descent. This ascent has been disputed.

Yalung Kang was first successfully climbed in winter by the 1989-90 Korean Winter Yalung Kang Expedition. Climbing via the SE face, Kyo-Sup Jin, Ang Dawa Sherpa and Tchiring Thebe Sherpa all reached the summit on December 20, 1989, but were killed in the descent.

=== Recent history ===
In 2014, Chhanda Gayen and her two sherpa guides, Tembu Sherpa and Dawa Wengu Sherpa, died in an avalanche while attempting the summit of Yalung Kang. Gayen had become the first Indian woman to climb Kangchenjunga two days before.

In 2024, 18-year-old Nima Rinji Sherpa became the youngest person ever to summit Mt. Kanchenjunga and also Yalung Kang.
