= Annapurna II =

Mountain in Nepal

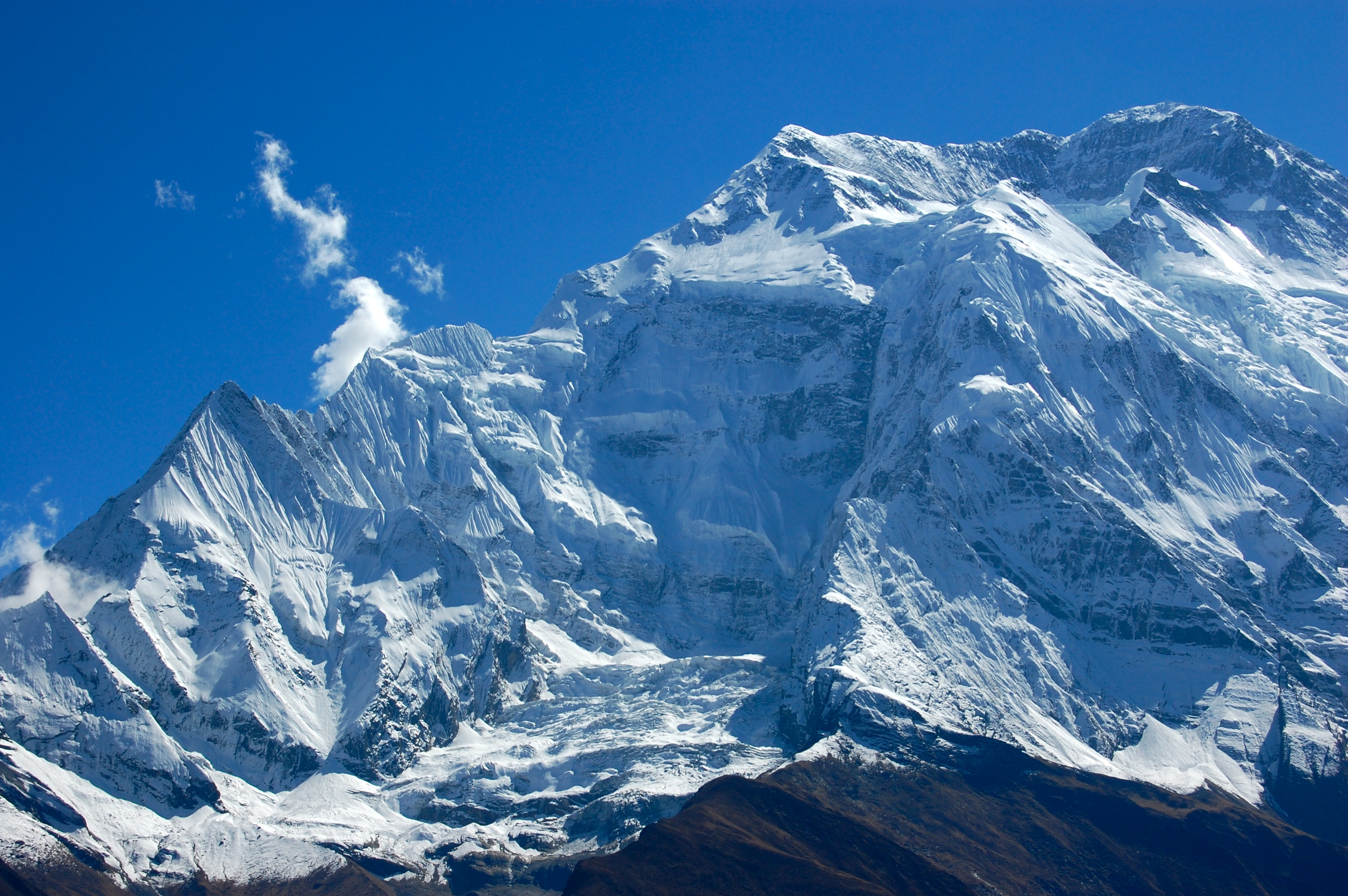
- The Northeastern Face of Annapurna II

Highest point
- Elevation: 7,937 m (26,040 ft); Ranked 16th
- Prominence: 2,437 m (7,995 ft)
- Parent peak: Annapurna I
- Isolation: 29.02 km (18.03 mi)
- Listing: Seven-thousander; Ultra
- Coordinates: 28°32′9″N 84°7′17″E

Geography
- The major peaks (not mountains) above 7,500 m (24,600 ft) height in Himalayas, rank identified in Himalayas alone (not the world). Legend: 1：Mount Everest; 2：Kangchenjunga; 3：Lhotse; 4：Yalung Kang, Kanchenjunga West; 5：Makalu; 6：Kangchenjunga South; 7：Kangchenjunga Central; 8：Cho Oyu; 9：Dhaulagiri; 10：Manaslu (Kutang); 11：Nanga Parbat (Diamer); 12：Annapurna; 13：Shishapangma (Shishasbangma, Xixiabangma); 14：Manaslu East; 15：Annapurna East Peak; 16： Gyachung Kang; 17：Annapurna II; 18：Tenzing Peak (Ngojumba Kang, Ngozumpa Kang, Ngojumba Ri); 19：Kangbachen; 20：Himalchuli (Himal Chuli); 21：Ngadi Chuli (Peak 29, Dakura, Dakum, Dunapurna); 22：Nuptse (Nubtse); 23：Nanda Devi; 24：Chomo Lonzo (Chomolonzo, Chomolönzo, Chomo Lönzo, Jomolönzo, Lhamalangcho); 25：Namcha Barwa (Namchabarwa); 26：Zemu Kang (Zemu Gap Peak); 27：Kamet; 28：Dhaulagiri II; 29：Ngojumba Kang II; 30：Dhaulagiri III; 31：Kumbhakarna Mountain (Mount Kumbhakarna, Jannu); 32：Gurla Mandhata (Naimona'nyi, Namu Nan); 33：Hillary Peak (Ngojumba Kang III); 34：Molamenqing (Phola Gangchen); 35：Dhaulagiri IV; 36：Annapurna Fang; 37：Silver Crag; 38：Kangbachen Southwest; 39：Gangkhar Puensum (Gangkar Punsum); 40：Annapurna III; 41：Himalchuli West; 42：Annapurna IV; 43：Kula Kangri; 44：Liankang Kangri (Gangkhar Puensum North, Liangkang Kangri); 45：Ngadi Chuli South
- Location: Annapurna Massif, Gandaki Province, Nepal
- Parent range: Annapurna

Climbing
- First ascent: May 17, 1960
- Easiest route: snow/ice climb
- Normal route: West Ridge

Annapurna II is the second-highest mountain of the Annapurna range located in Nepal, and the eastern anchor of the range.

In terms of elevation, isolation (distance to a higher summit, namely Annapurna I East Peak, 29.02 km or 18.03 mi) and prominence (2,437 m or 7,995 ft), Annapurna II does not rank far behind Annapurna I Main, which serves as the western anchor. It is a fully independent peak, despite the close association with Annapurna I Main which its name implies; it is, however, closely connected to the shorter Annapurna IV. Annapurna II is the 16th highest mountain in the world, and the highest ultra-prominent peak on Earth under eight-thousand metres.

== Features ==
Annapurna II sits apart from the main ridge of the Annapurna Massif, along with the shorter Annapurna IV. Its summit proper lies along a steep rock ridge, relatively free of snow towards its highest point, which drops in altitude to run west to the summit of the smaller peak. The South Face is a large pyramidal wall only interrupted by the central spur, while the North Face is more complex, with steep walls cascading between ice fields near the summit and base of the mountain. To the northwest, a large hanging glacier occupies the flank between it and Annapurna IV, while the Northeastern wall has a distinctive, recurrent series of cornices and rock bands resembling a human face or skull, visible in the above photograph.

Annapurna II is notable for its large avalanches, especially those originating from the high snowpack behind the North-central buttress. Other dangers include rockfall, large ice overhangs, and frequent storms. These have limited the scope of mountaineering expeditions, indeed, the standard route of ascent uses the central connecting ridge with Annapurna IV to bypass many of its objective hazards.

== Climbing history ==
It was first climbed in 1960 by a British/Indian/Nepalese team led by J. O. M. Roberts via the West Ridge, reached by climbing the North face of Annapurna IV. The summit party comprised Richard Grant, Chris Bonington, and Sherpa Ang Nyima.

Yugoslavs from Slovenia repeated this ascent in 1969, also climbing Annapurna IV. Kazimir Drašlar and Matija Maležič reached the summit. In 1973 Japanese took a shortcut by climbing directly up the north face between IV and V before continuing along the west ridge. Katsuyuki Kondo reached the top by himself.

In 1983, Tim Macartney-Snape planned and participated in an expedition to Annapurna II (7,937 m or 26,040 ft), reaching the summit via the first ascent of the south spur. The descent was delayed by a blizzard and the expedition ran out of food during the last five days. They were reported missing and when the expedition eventually returned they received significant publicity.

On 4 February 2007, Philipp Kunz, Lhakpa Wangel, Temba Nuru and Lhakpa Thinduk made the first winter ascent. The team followed the route of the first ascent from the north.

== See also ==
- Annapurna
  - Annapurna IV
  - Annapurna I Main
  - Annapurna I Central
  - Annapurna I East
  - Annapurna III
- List of ultras of the Himalayas
