= Himalchuli =

Mountain in Nepal

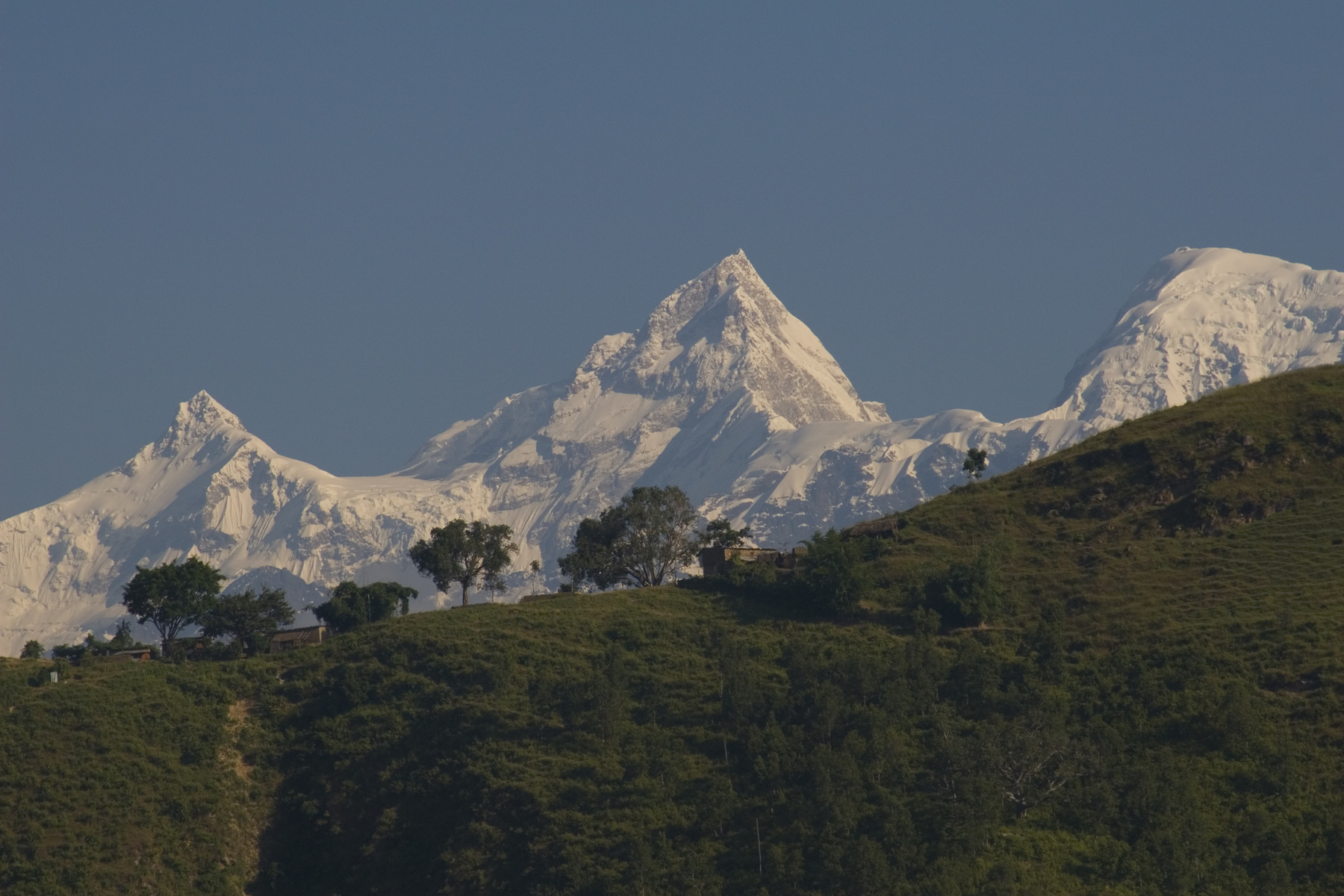
- Himalchuli from south

Highest point
- Elevation: 7,893 m (25,896 ft); Ranked 18th
- Prominence: 1,633 m (5,358 ft)
- Listing: Mountains of Nepal; Ultra
- Coordinates: 28°26′03″N 84°38′15″E

Geography
- The major peaks (not mountains) above 7,500 m (24,600 ft) height in Himalayas, rank identified in Himalayas alone (not the world). Legend: 1：Mount Everest; 2：Kangchenjunga; 3：Lhotse; 4：Yalung Kang, Kanchenjunga West; 5：Makalu; 6：Kangchenjunga South; 7：Kangchenjunga Central; 8：Cho Oyu; 9：Dhaulagiri; 10：Manaslu (Kutang); 11：Nanga Parbat (Diamer); 12：Annapurna; 13：Shishapangma (Shishasbangma, Xixiabangma); 14：Manaslu East; 15：Annapurna East Peak; 16： Gyachung Kang; 17：Annapurna II; 18：Tenzing Peak (Ngojumba Kang, Ngozumpa Kang, Ngojumba Ri); 19：Kangbachen; 20：Himalchuli (Himal Chuli); 21：Ngadi Chuli (Peak 29, Dakura, Dakum, Dunapurna); 22：Nuptse (Nubtse); 23：Nanda Devi; 24：Chomo Lonzo (Chomolonzo, Chomolönzo, Chomo Lönzo, Jomolönzo, Lhamalangcho); 25：Namcha Barwa (Namchabarwa); 26：Zemu Kang (Zemu Gap Peak); 27：Kamet; 28：Dhaulagiri II; 29：Ngojumba Kang II; 30：Dhaulagiri III; 31：Kumbhakarna Mountain (Mount Kumbhakarna, Jannu); 32：Gurla Mandhata (Naimona'nyi, Namu Nan); 33：Hillary Peak (Ngojumba Kang III); 34：Molamenqing (Phola Gangchen); 35：Dhaulagiri IV; 36：Annapurna Fang; 37：Silver Crag; 38：Kangbachen Southwest; 39：Gangkhar Puensum (Gangkar Punsum); 40：Annapurna III; 41：Himalchuli West; 42：Annapurna IV; 43：Kula Kangri; 44：Liankang Kangri (Gangkhar Puensum North, Liangkang Kangri); 45：Ngadi Chuli South; Location in Nepal
- Location: Lamjung, Gorkha-Gandaki Province, Nepal
- Parent range: Mansiri Himal, Himalayas

Climbing
- First ascent: May 24, 1960 by Hisashi Tanabe, Masahiro Harada
- Easiest route: glacier/snow/ice climb

Himalchuli (also sometimes written as two words, Himal Chuli) is the second-highest mountain in the Mansiri Himal, part of the Nepalese Himalayas, and the 18th-highest mountain in the world.

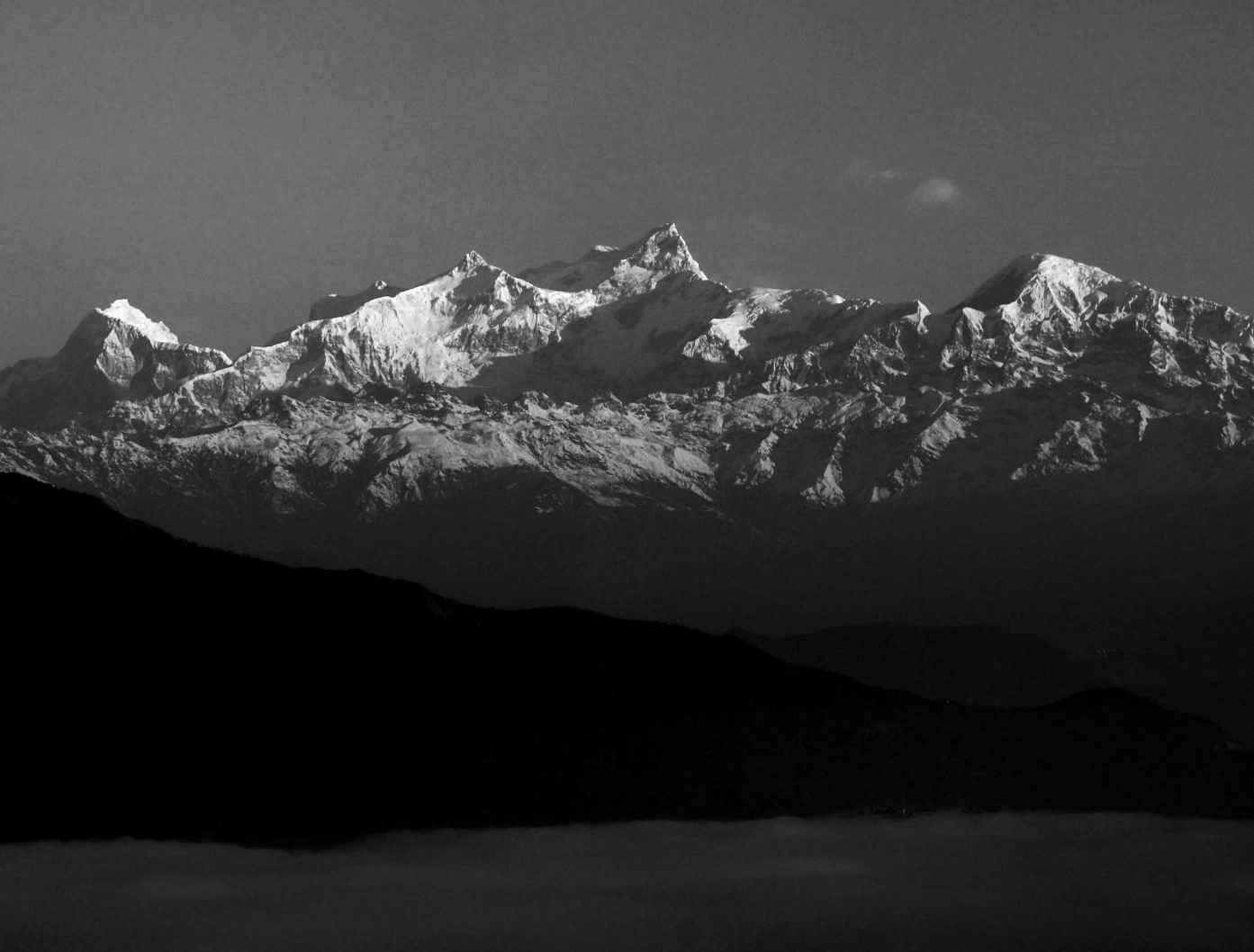
Black and white image of Mount Himalchuli from the premise of Gorkha Durbar.

== Features ==
Lying south-southeast of Manaslu and Ngadi Chuli, Himalchuli is the second-highest and southernmost of the three mountains that form the heart of the Mansiri Himal. It is a complex massif with a vast horizontal sprawl, connected to shorter satellite peaks such as Baudha (6,672 m (21,890 ft)) by numerous steep, winding ridges. A central plateau situated entirely above an elevation of 7000 metres is ringed by its three main peaks: East (7,893 m (25,896 ft)), West (7,540 m (24,740 ft)) and North (7,371 m (24,183 ft)). The main pyramid of the East summit is considered the eighteenth highest independent mountain on earth.

Himalchuli is also notable for its large vertical relief over local terrain. For example, it rises 7,000 metres (23,000 feet) over the Marshyangdi River to the southwest in about 27 km (17 mi) horizontal distance.

== Climbing history ==
Exploratory visits to the peak were made in 1950 and 1954, and a first attempt in 1955 failed early on. Further reconnaissance and attempts followed in 1958 and 1959.

The first ascent was made on May 24, 1960, by Hisashi Tanabe and Masahiro Harada, of Japan. The route followed the "Sickle Ridge" from the southwest. They first climbed to the saddle between the West and Main peaks, where they placed the last of six camps. This ascent was somewhat unusual for a sub-8000m peak in using bottled oxygen.

The Himalayan Index lists five other ascents of this peak, and 10 additional unsuccessful attempts. The ascents were by various routes on the south, southwest, and southeast sides of the mountain.

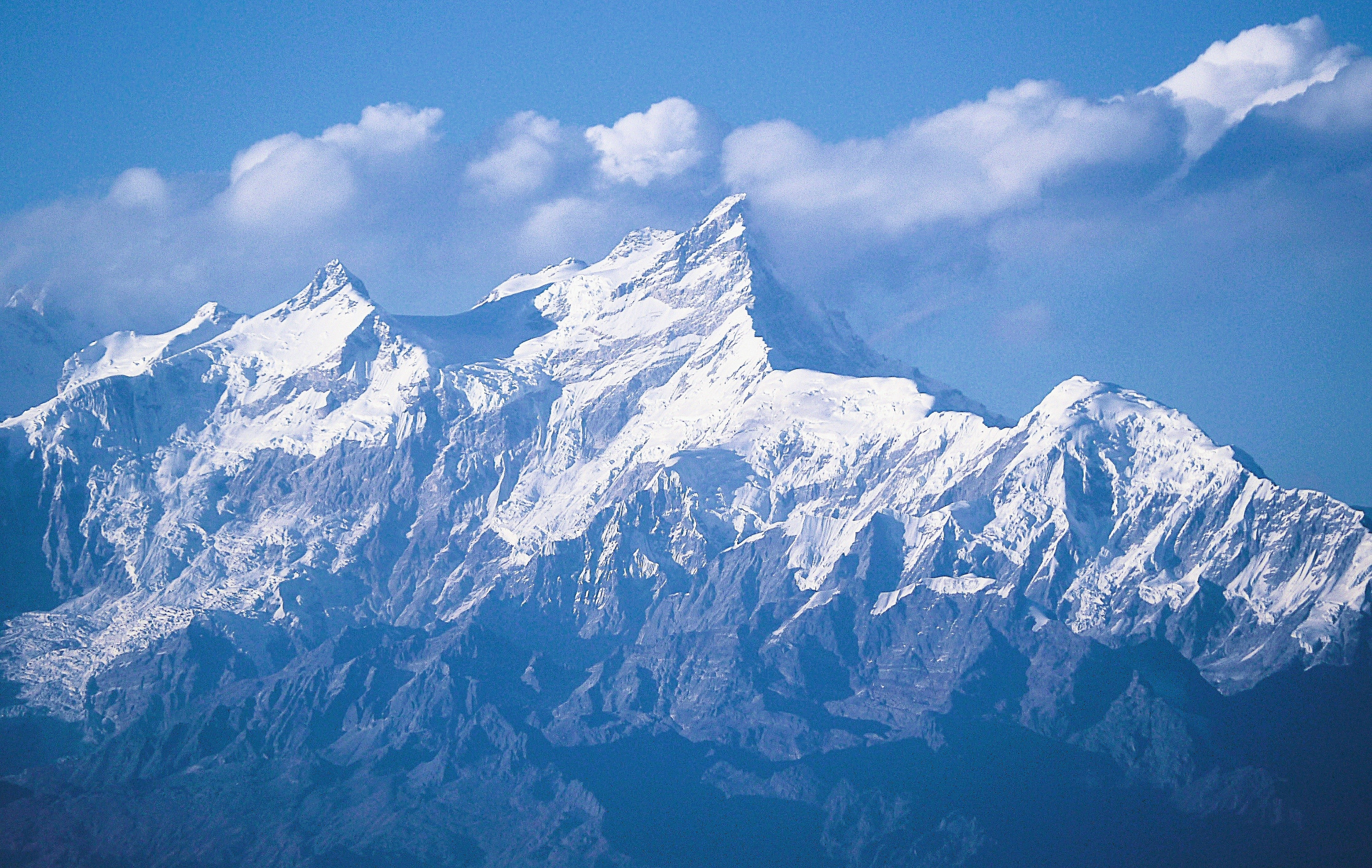
Aerial view of Himalchuli

The West Peak was first climbed in 1978 by two members of a Japanese expedition to the main peak of Himalchuli. They climbed from the south (the Dordi Khola) and approached the summit of the West Peak from the east.

The North Peak was first climbed in 1985 by a Korean expedition, via the North Face.

== See also ==
- List of ultras of the Himalayas

== Sources ==
- Neate, Jill (1989). High Asia: An Illustrated History of the 7000 Metre Peaks. Seattle: The Mountaineers. ISBN 0-89886-238-8.
- "Himalayan Index". The Alpine Club. Archived from the original on 2017-07-17.
- DEM files for the Himalaya (Corrected versions of SRTM data)
