= Annapurna IV =

Mountain in the Himalayas

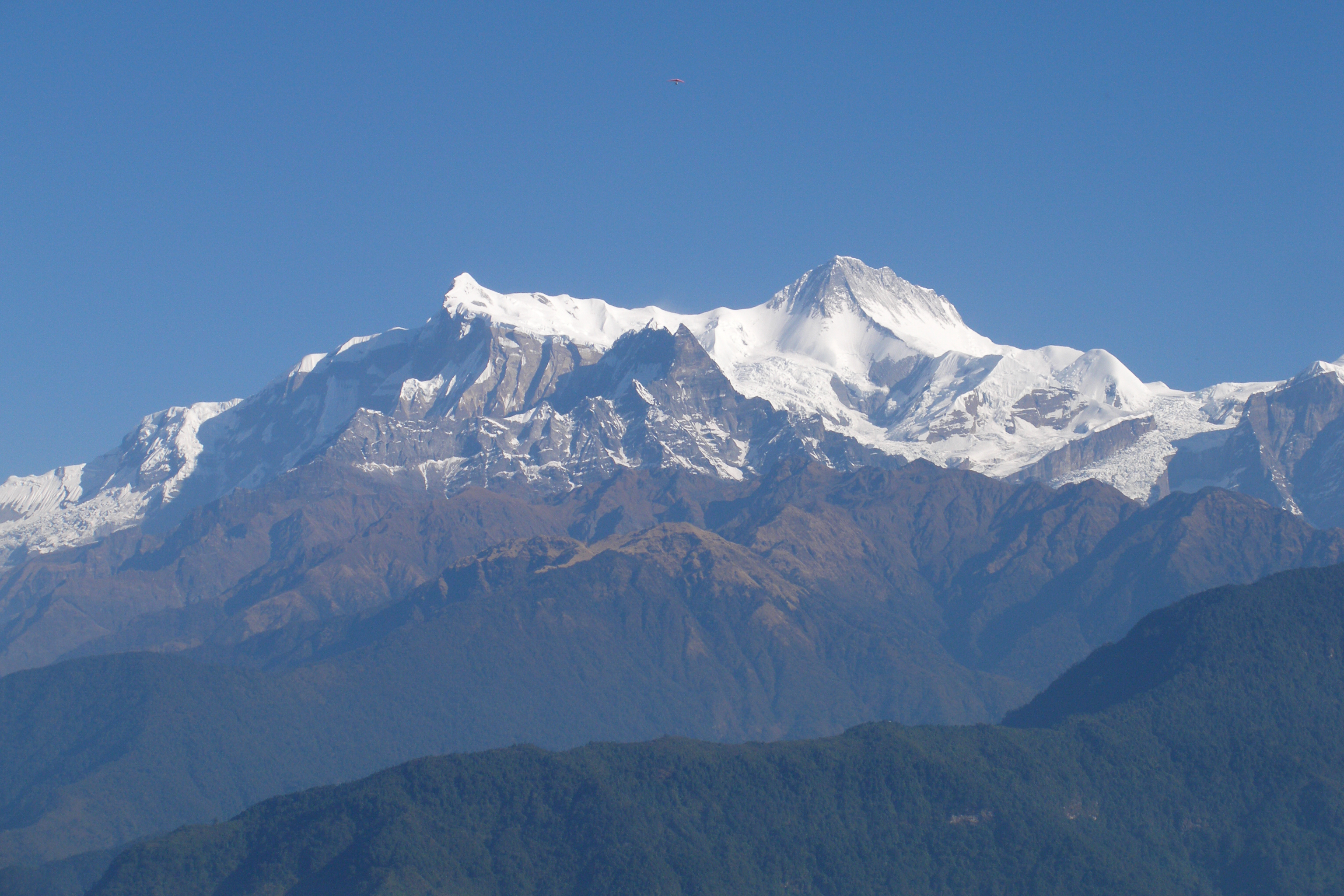
- Annapurna IV (left) and Annapurna II, seen from the south.

Highest point
- Elevation: 7,525 m (24,688 ft)
- Prominence: 255 m (837 ft)
- Parent peak: Annapurna II
- Isolation: 3.81 km (2.37 mi)
- Coordinates: 28°32′15″N 84°4′58″E

Geography
- The major peaks (not mountains) above 7,500 m (24,600 ft) height in Himalayas, rank identified in Himalayas alone (not the world). Legend: 1：Mount Everest; 2：Kangchenjunga; 3：Lhotse; 4：Yalung Kang, Kanchenjunga West; 5：Makalu; 6：Kangchenjunga South; 7：Kangchenjunga Central; 8：Cho Oyu; 9：Dhaulagiri; 10：Manaslu (Kutang); 11：Nanga Parbat (Diamer); 12：Annapurna; 13：Shishapangma (Shishasbangma, Xixiabangma); 14：Manaslu East; 15：Annapurna East Peak; 16： Gyachung Kang; 17：Annapurna II; 18：Tenzing Peak (Ngojumba Kang, Ngozumpa Kang, Ngojumba Ri); 19：Kangbachen; 20：Himalchuli (Himal Chuli); 21：Ngadi Chuli (Peak 29, Dakura, Dakum, Dunapurna); 22：Nuptse (Nubtse); 23：Nanda Devi; 24：Chomo Lonzo (Chomolonzo, Chomolönzo, Chomo Lönzo, Jomolönzo, Lhamalangcho); 25：Namcha Barwa (Namchabarwa); 26：Zemu Kang (Zemu Gap Peak); 27：Kamet; 28：Dhaulagiri II; 29：Ngojumba Kang II; 30：Dhaulagiri III; 31：Kumbhakarna Mountain (Mount Kumbhakarna, Jannu); 32：Gurla Mandhata (Naimona'nyi, Namu Nan); 33：Hillary Peak (Ngojumba Kang III); 34：Molamenqing (Phola Gangchen); 35：Dhaulagiri IV; 36：Annapurna Fang; 37：Silver Crag; 38：Kangbachen Southwest; 39：Gangkhar Puensum (Gangkar Punsum); 40：Annapurna III; 41：Himalchuli West; 42：Annapurna IV; 43：Kula Kangri; 44：Liankang Kangri (Gangkhar Puensum North, Liangkang Kangri); 45：Ngadi Chuli South
- Location: Annapurna, Gandaki Province, Nepal
- Parent range: Annapurna Himal

Climbing
- First ascent: 1955
- Easiest route: snow/ice climb

Annapurna IV (Nepali: अन्नपूर्ण ४) is a mountain in the eastern wing of the Annapurna mountain range in the Himalayas in Gandaki Province, Nepal. It has an elevation of 7,525 metres (24,688 ft), making it the 38th highest peak in Nepal.

== Location and description ==
It is connected by a ridge to Annapurna II, 7,937 metres (26,040 ft) to the east, while it is separated from the ridge of Annapurna III, 7,555 metres (24,787 ft) to the west, by the col of Sabje La. Because it shares a ridge with Annapurna III, its topographic prominence is only 255 metres (837 ft).

To the east is the Marshyangdi River, to the west the Kali Gandaki Gorge, considered by some to be the deepest gorge in the world.

== History ==
It was created by the continuing collision between the Indian and Eurasian tectonic plate.

In 2023, Jérôme Lavé et. al. published a paper stating that a gigantic rockfall of about 23 cubic kilometres (5.5 cu mi) dating to around 1190 had reduced the mountain's height from over 8,000 metres (26,000 ft) based on analysis of nearby debris.

H. B. Tilman and his party reached an altitude of 24,000 feet (7,300 m) in 1950, while a Japanese group reached 19,000 feet (5,800 m) two years later. It was first climbed on May 30, 1955, by a German expedition led by Heinz Steinmetz via the North Face and Northwest Ridge. The summit party comprised Steinmetz, Harald Biller and Jürgen Wellenkamp. In 1982, Roger Marshall, Alan Burgess, and Adrian Burgess, of a Canadian expedition, reached the top. In 1996, two unsuccessful attempts were made; in one, Richard Davidson and Debbie Marshall smothered to death in their sleep in their tent when it collapsed under a metre of snow.

Rockfalls from Annapurna IV are thought to have blocked the Seti River in 2012, creating a temporary dam.

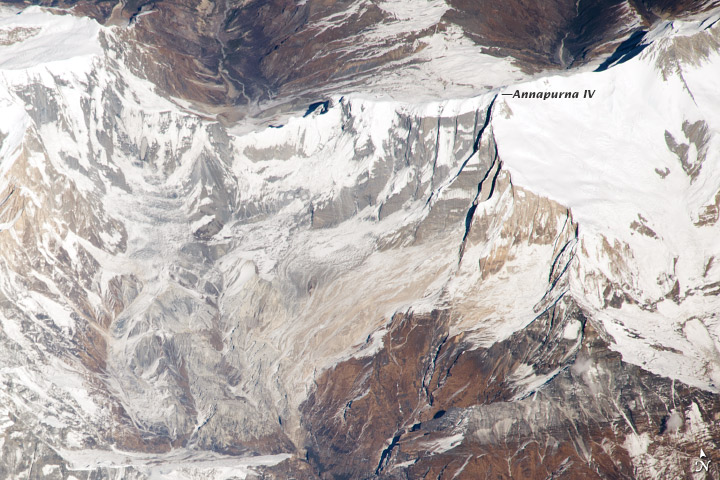
Annapurna IV

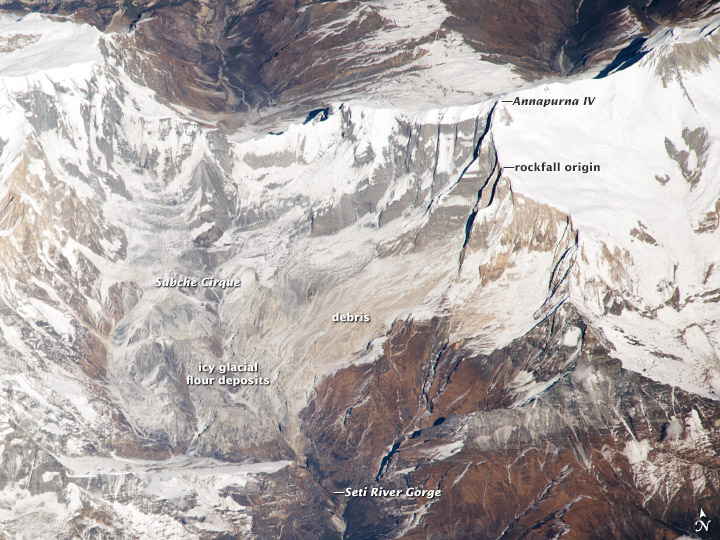
The rockfall that temporarily blocked the river in 2012 (2013)

== See also ==
- Annapurna I Main
- Annapurna I Central
- Annapurna I East
