= Kangchenjunga South =

Subsidiary peak of Kangchenjunga

Kangchenjunga South Summit
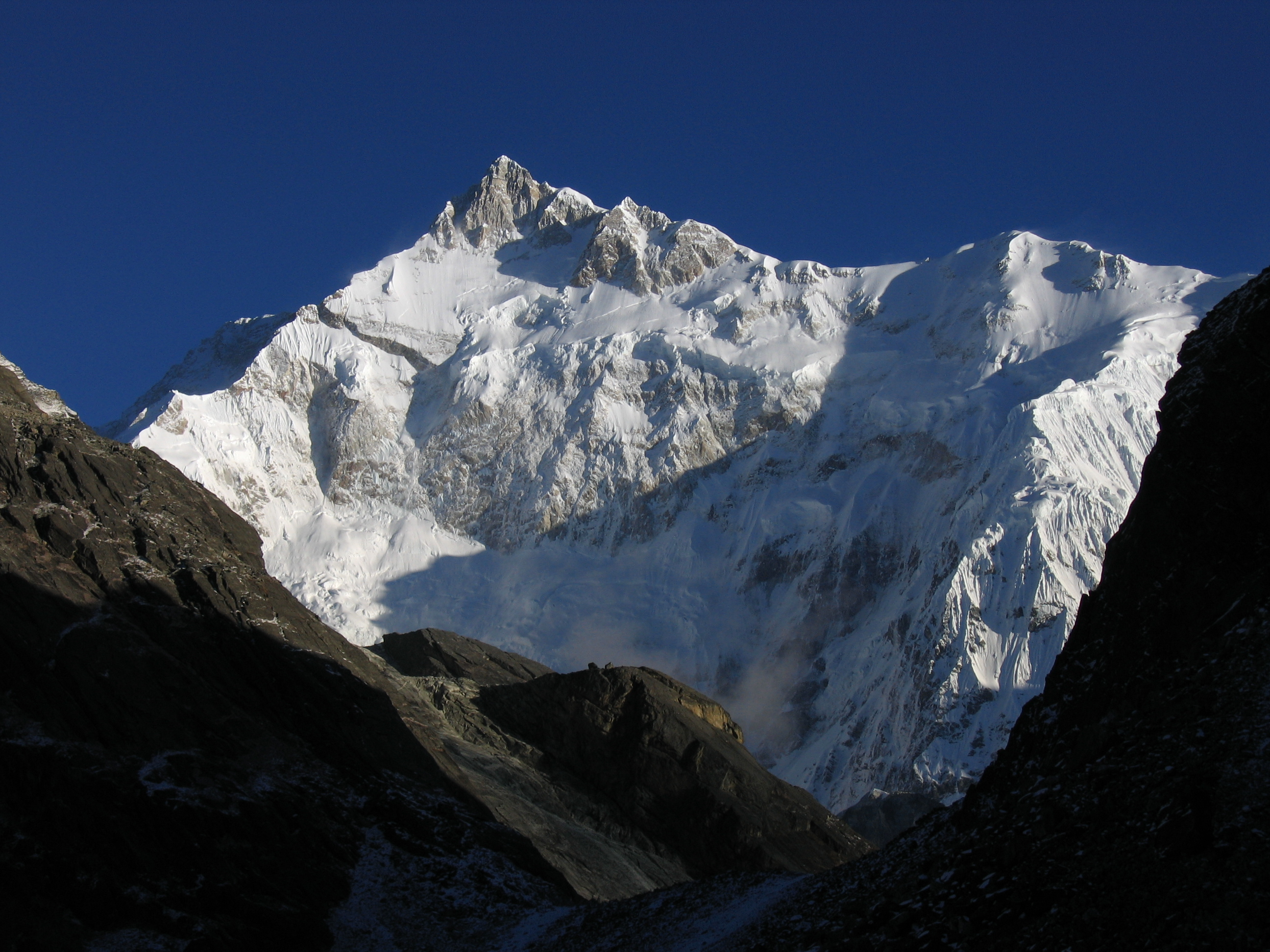
- Kangchenjunga South Summit and South Face of Goecha-La

Highest point
- Elevation: 8,476 m (27,808 ft)
- Prominence: 76 m (249 ft)
- Parent peak: Kangchenjunga
- Isolation: 1.13 km (0.70 mi)
- Coordinates: 27°41′30″N 88°9′15″E

Geography
- The major peaks (not mountains) above 7,500 m (24,600 ft) height in Himalayas, rank identified in Himalayas alone (not the world). Legend: 1：Mount Everest; 2：Kangchenjunga; 3：Lhotse; 4：Yalung Kang, Kanchenjunga West; 5：Makalu; 6：Kangchenjunga South; 7：Kangchenjunga Central; 8：Cho Oyu; 9：Dhaulagiri; 10：Manaslu (Kutang); 11：Nanga Parbat (Diamer); 12：Annapurna; 13：Shishapangma (Shishasbangma, Xixiabangma); 14：Manaslu East; 15：Annapurna East Peak; 16： Gyachung Kang; 17：Annapurna II; 18：Tenzing Peak (Ngojumba Kang, Ngozumpa Kang, Ngojumba Ri); 19：Kangbachen; 20：Himalchuli (Himal Chuli); 21：Ngadi Chuli (Peak 29, Dakura, Dakum, Dunapurna); 22：Nuptse (Nubtse); 23：Nanda Devi; 24：Chomo Lonzo (Chomolonzo, Chomolönzo, Chomo Lönzo, Jomolönzo, Lhamalangcho); 25：Namcha Barwa (Namchabarwa); 26：Zemu Kang (Zemu Gap Peak); 27：Kamet; 28：Dhaulagiri II; 29：Ngojumba Kang II; 30：Dhaulagiri III; 31：Kumbhakarna Mountain (Mount Kumbhakarna, Jannu); 32：Gurla Mandhata (Naimona'nyi, Namu Nan); 33：Hillary Peak (Ngojumba Kang III); 34：Molamenqing (Phola Gangchen); 35：Dhaulagiri IV; 36：Annapurna Fang; 37：Silver Crag; 38：Kangbachen Southwest; 39：Gangkhar Puensum (Gangkar Punsum); 40：Annapurna III; 41：Himalchuli West; 42：Annapurna IV; 43：Kula Kangri; 44：Liankang Kangri (Gangkhar Puensum North, Liangkang Kangri); 45：Ngadi Chuli South
- Location: Taplejung District, Nepal; Mangan district, Sikkim, India
- Parent range: Himalayas

Climbing
- First ascent: May 19, 1978 by Eugeniusz Chrobak and Wojciech Wróż

Kangchenjunga South Peak is a 8,476-metre (27,808 ft) high subsidiary peak of Kangchenjunga, the third highest mountain in the world.

The summit is located in the Himalayan range, on the border between Nepal and India. A ridge leads north over the middle peak to the main peak of Kangchenjunga. To the east, a ridge branches off to Zemu Kang (7,730 m). To the south, the ridge continues over Hogsback Peak (7,379 m) and Talung (7,349 m) to Kabru.

== Mountaineering ==
The mountain has rarely been climbed, with only six expeditions counted by the Himalayan Database as of 2024.

The first ascent of Kangchenjunga South took place in 1978, 23 years after the first successful summit of the main peak. It was climbed by a Polish team consisting of Eugeniusz Chrobak and Wojciech Wróż.

In 1989, the mountain was climbed for the first time without supplemental oxygen by a Russian team led by Eduard Myslovsky.

In 1991, Marko Prezelj and Andrej Štremfelj successfully summited Kangchenjunga South by its Southwest ridge, in alpine style. After a challenging climb, they reached the summit on April 30. The following year, the pair were awarded the inaugural Piolets d'Or for their successful ascent.

In 2012, Kangchenjunga South was first summited in Winter, when it was climbed by German Philipp Kunz and his team of four Sherpas, Tshering Dorje Sherpa, Kami Chiriri Lama, Lhakpa Wangel Sherpa, and Nima Ongdi Sherpa. The team reached the summit on February 15. Supplementary oxygen was not used in the ascent, and the expedition took 15 days in total.

== See also ==
- Yalung Kang (Kangchenjunga West)
- Kangbachen
