= Molamenqing =

Mountain in Tibet, China

- Phola Gangchen
- The major peaks (not mountains) above 7,500 m (24,600 ft) height in Himalayas, rank identified in Himalayas alone (not the world). Legend: 1：Mount Everest; 2：Kangchenjunga; 3：Lhotse; 4：Yalung Kang, Kanchenjunga West; 5：Makalu; 6：Kangchenjunga South; 7：Kangchenjunga Central; 8：Cho Oyu; 9：Dhaulagiri; 10：Manaslu (Kutang); 11：Nanga Parbat (Diamer); 12：Annapurna; 13：Shishapangma (Shishasbangma, Xixiabangma); 14：Manaslu East; 15：Annapurna East Peak; 16： Gyachung Kang; 17：Annapurna II; 18：Tenzing Peak (Ngojumba Kang, Ngozumpa Kang, Ngojumba Ri); 19：Kangbachen; 20：Himalchuli (Himal Chuli); 21：Ngadi Chuli (Peak 29, Dakura, Dakum, Dunapurna); 22：Nuptse (Nubtse); 23：Nanda Devi; 24：Chomo Lonzo (Chomolonzo, Chomolönzo, Chomo Lönzo, Jomolönzo, Lhamalangcho); 25：Namcha Barwa (Namchabarwa); 26：Zemu Kang (Zemu Gap Peak); 27：Kamet; 28：Dhaulagiri II; 29：Ngojumba Kang II; 30：Dhaulagiri III; 31：Kumbhakarna Mountain (Mount Kumbhakarna, Jannu); 32：Gurla Mandhata (Naimona'nyi, Namu Nan); 33：Hillary Peak (Ngojumba Kang III); 34：Molamenqing (Phola Gangchen); 35：Dhaulagiri IV; 36：Annapurna Fang; 37：Silver Crag; 38：Kangbachen Southwest; 39：Gangkhar Puensum (Gangkar Punsum); 40：Annapurna III; 41：Himalchuli West; 42：Annapurna IV; 43：Kula Kangri; 44：Liankang Kangri (Gangkhar Puensum North, Liangkang Kangri); 45：Ngadi Chuli South

Highest point
- Elevation: 7,703 m (25,272 ft)
- Prominence: 433 m (1,421 ft)
- Coordinates: 28°21′17″N 85°48′39″E

Geography
- Country: China
- Region: Tibet
- Parent range: Jugal/Langtang Himal, Himalayas

Climbing
- First ascent: 1981 by B. Farmer, R. Price (New Zealand)
- Easiest route: glacier/snow/ice climb

Molamenqing, also known as Phola Gangchen, is an eastern outlier of Shishapangma, the 14th-highest peak in the world. Both are in the Jugal Himal, a subrange of the Himalayas in Tibet. (This range is contiguous with, and often considered a part of, the Langtang Himal.) Its elevation is also given as 7,661 m (25,135 ft); the elevation given here is from a Chinese survey. Molamenqing is little-known, partly since it does not have much independent stature. Its topographic prominence, i.e. its rise above the saddle connecting it with Shishapangma, is only 430 metres, which is relatively small for a Himalayan peak, although large enough for it to qualify in some reckonings as an independent peak.

Molamenqing did enjoy a temporary fame in the early 1980s. At the time it was one of the highest unclimbed peaks in the world (using a prominence cutoff low enough to qualify it as a separate summit). A team from New Zealand applied to the Chinese authorities to climb the peak, and became one of the first Western teams to be allowed to climb in Tibet since before World War II. The team succeeded in making the first, and so far the only, ascent of the mountain in 1981. They started from the east side of the peak, but their long route went via the north side of Shishapangma and approached the summit from the west. Bruce Farmer and Dick Price first reached the summit on May 14. Members of the team also reached the summit on May 16 and 20.

In 2013, a Slovenian team attempted to climb the south face but were repelled early on by an extremely broken glacier. They then tried the east face and managed to setup a tent site at ca. 6,600 m (21,700 ft). After reaching ca. 6,800 m (22,300 ft), they turned back to due snow and wind conditions. A storm persisted and the lack of supplies forced them to retreat.

The Himalayan Index lists no other attempts on this peak.
