= Kangbachen =

Minor peak of Kangchenjunga massif

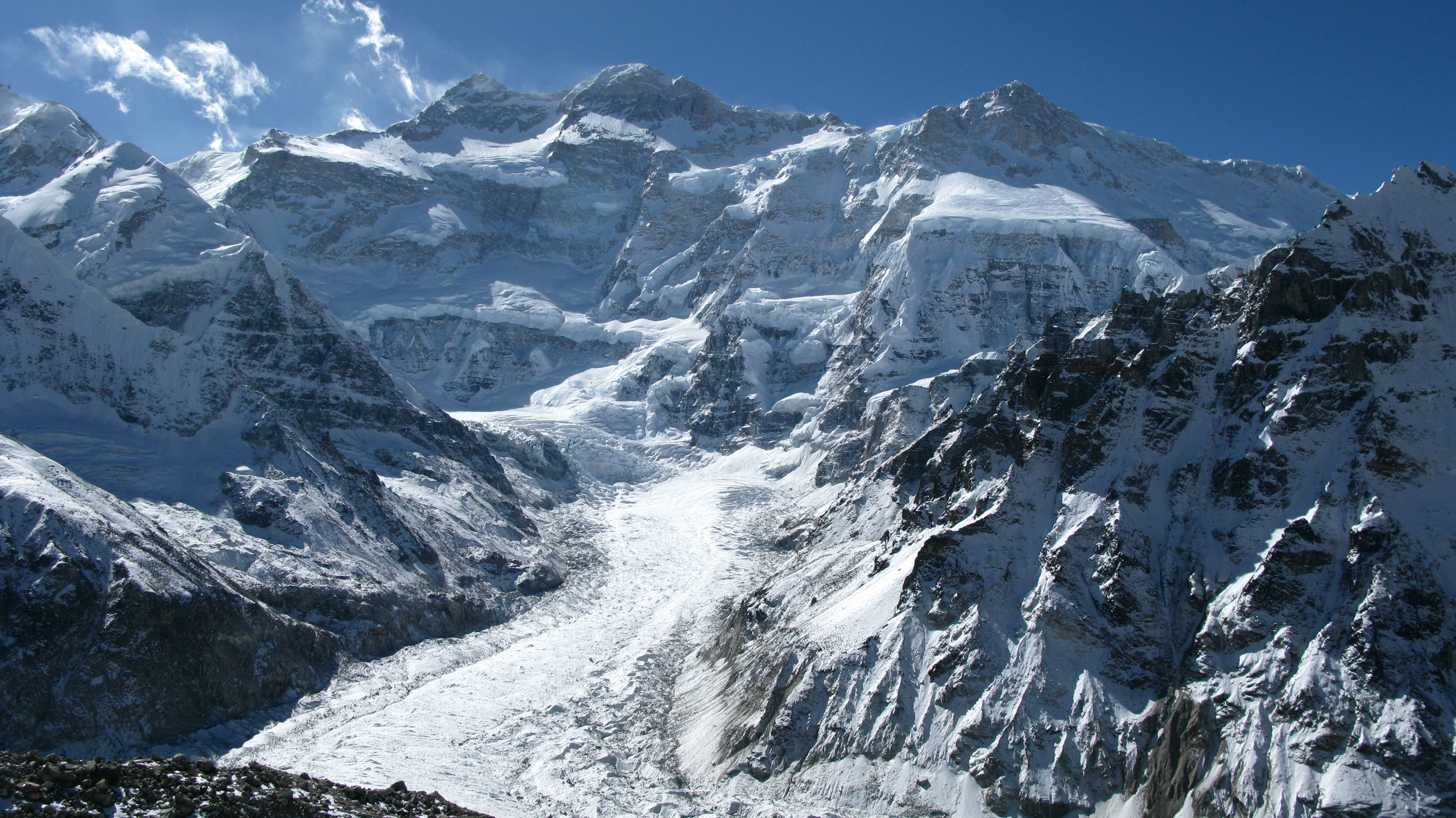

Highest point
- Elevation: 7,903 m (25,928 ft)
- Parent peak: Kangchenjunga
- Listing: Mountains of Nepal
- Coordinates: 27.7166°N 88.1105°E

Geography
- The major peaks (not mountains) above 7,500 m (24,600 ft) height in Himalayas, rank identified in Himalayas alone (not the world). Legend: 1：Mount Everest; 2：Kangchenjunga; 3：Lhotse; 4：Yalung Kang, Kanchenjunga West; 5：Makalu; 6：Kangchenjunga South; 7：Kangchenjunga Central; 8：Cho Oyu; 9：Dhaulagiri; 10：Manaslu (Kutang); 11：Nanga Parbat (Diamer); 12：Annapurna; 13：Shishapangma (Shishasbangma, Xixiabangma); 14：Manaslu East; 15：Annapurna East Peak; 16： Gyachung Kang; 17：Annapurna II; 18：Tenzing Peak (Ngojumba Kang, Ngozumpa Kang, Ngojumba Ri); 19：Kangbachen; 20：Himalchuli (Himal Chuli); 21：Ngadi Chuli (Peak 29, Dakura, Dakum, Dunapurna); 22：Nuptse (Nubtse); 23：Nanda Devi; 24：Chomo Lonzo (Chomolonzo, Chomolönzo, Chomo Lönzo, Jomolönzo, Lhamalangcho); 25：Namcha Barwa (Namchabarwa); 26：Zemu Kang (Zemu Gap Peak); 27：Kamet; 28：Dhaulagiri II; 29：Ngojumba Kang II; 30：Dhaulagiri III; 31：Kumbhakarna Mountain (Mount Kumbhakarna, Jannu); 32：Gurla Mandhata (Naimona'nyi, Namu Nan); 33：Hillary Peak (Ngojumba Kang III); 34：Molamenqing (Phola Gangchen); 35：Dhaulagiri IV; 36：Annapurna Fang; 37：Silver Crag; 38：Kangbachen Southwest; 39：Gangkhar Puensum (Gangkar Punsum); 40：Annapurna III; 41：Himalchuli West; 42：Annapurna IV; 43：Kula Kangri; 44：Liankang Kangri (Gangkhar Puensum North, Liangkang Kangri); 45：Ngadi Chuli South
- Parent range: Himalayas

Climbing
- First ascent: 1974

Kangbachen is a subsidiary peak of Kangchenjunga in the Nepalese part of the Himalayas. The Kangchenjunga massif's local name translates to "Five treasures of the high snow" in reference to its five peaks, one being Kangbachen.

Kangbachen lies on the west ridge of the Kangchenjunga range, in Nepal. It is the smallest of Kangchenjunga's five peaks and the only one less than eight thousand meters (7,903 m). It is also the only one of Kangchenjunga's peaks entirely in Nepal.

Kangbachen has rarely been climbed compared to other mountains on the range. It has only had ten recorded expeditions since 1930, and only two successful summits, according to the Himalayan Database.

It was first summited on May 26, 1974, via the southwest ridge by a Polish expedition team, composed of Kazimierz Olech, Wiesław Kłaput, Marek Malatyński, Zbigniew Rubinowski and Wojciech Brański. The second successful summit, by a Yugoslavian team, took place just over four months later, on September 29, 1974.

As of 2024, the East, and South faces of Kangbachen are unclimbed.

== Climbing History ==
1930 —Günter Dyhrenfurth / Smythe rope team attempted to reach the summit, but turned back at 6400m

1949 — Alfred Sutter Swiss Expedition hits high point of 5490m, no summit attempt

1965 — Yugoslavian expedition by Mountaineering Club Ljubljana abandoned at 7600m due to frostbite

1973 — Japanese Himalayan Expedition of Rikkio University made four attempts at the summit, but heavy snow impeded their ascents each time. Highest point reached was 6550m

1974 — Successful summit by Polish team led by Kazimierz Olech and Polski Club Gorski

1974 — Yugoslavian expedition from Slovene Alpine Club, Ljubljana, led by Tone Škarja makes second successful summit

1984 — Solo attempt by Italy's Dante Porta, abandoned at 6000m due to altitude sickness

2007 — Slovenian Kangbachen Expedition, led by Tone Škarja, had to abandon attempt due to avalanche risk

2019 — Romano Benet and Nives Meroi Kangbachen Expedition, abandoned at 6300 due to large crevasse
