= Chomo Lonzo =

Mountain in Tibet, China

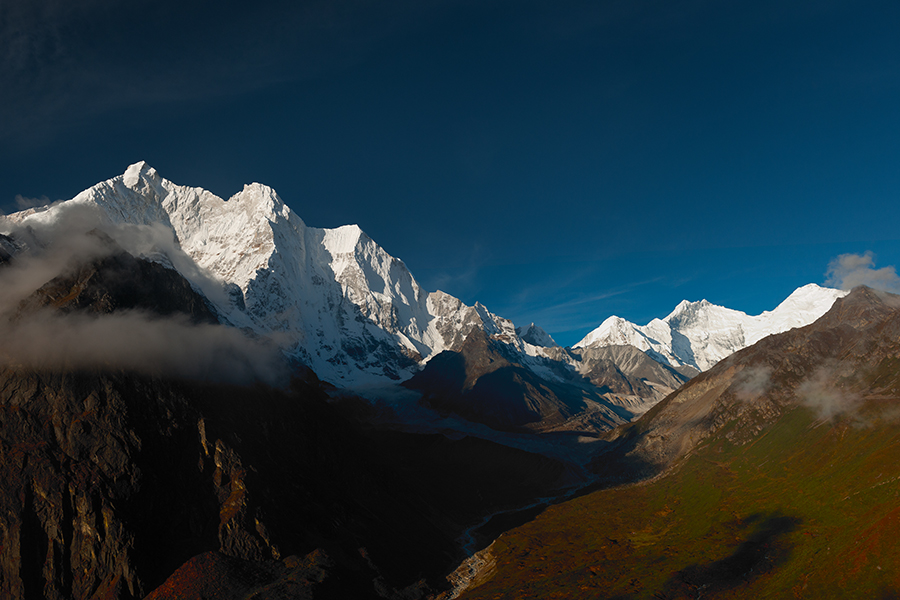
- Chomo Lonzo (left), Lhotse and Mt. Everest (right)

Highest point
- Elevation: 7,804 m (25,604 ft); Ranked 24th
- Prominence: 590 m (1,940 ft)
- Parent peak: Makalu
- Listing: Mountains of China; Highest mountains on Earth
- Coordinates: 27°55′47″N 87°06′26″E

Geography
- The major peaks (not mountains) above 7,500 m (24,600 ft) height in Himalayas, rank identified in Himalayas alone (not the world). Legend: 1：Mount Everest; 2：Kangchenjunga; 3：Lhotse; 4：Yalung Kang, Kanchenjunga West; 5：Makalu; 6：Kangchenjunga South; 7：Kangchenjunga Central; 8：Cho Oyu; 9：Dhaulagiri; 10：Manaslu (Kutang); 11：Nanga Parbat (Diamer); 12：Annapurna; 13：Shishapangma (Shishasbangma, Xixiabangma); 14：Manaslu East; 15：Annapurna East Peak; 16： Gyachung Kang; 17：Annapurna II; 18：Tenzing Peak (Ngojumba Kang, Ngozumpa Kang, Ngojumba Ri); 19：Kangbachen; 20：Himalchuli (Himal Chuli); 21：Ngadi Chuli (Peak 29, Dakura, Dakum, Dunapurna); 22：Nuptse (Nubtse); 23：Nanda Devi; 24：Chomo Lonzo (Chomolonzo, Chomolönzo, Chomo Lönzo, Jomolönzo, Lhamalangcho); 25：Namcha Barwa (Namchabarwa); 26：Zemu Kang (Zemu Gap Peak); 27：Kamet; 28：Dhaulagiri II; 29：Ngojumba Kang II; 30：Dhaulagiri III; 31：Kumbhakarna Mountain (Mount Kumbhakarna, Jannu); 32：Gurla Mandhata (Naimona'nyi, Namu Nan); 33：Hillary Peak (Ngojumba Kang III); 34：Molamenqing (Phola Gangchen); 35：Dhaulagiri IV; 36：Annapurna Fang; 37：Silver Crag; 38：Kangbachen Southwest; 39：Gangkhar Puensum (Gangkar Punsum); 40：Annapurna III; 41：Himalchuli West; 42：Annapurna IV; 43：Kula Kangri; 44：Liankang Kangri (Gangkhar Puensum North, Liangkang Kangri); 45：Ngadi Chuli South
- Country: China
- Region: Tibet
- Parent range: Mahalangur Himal

Climbing
- First ascent: 1954 by Jean Couzy and Lionel Terray
- Easiest route: Snow/ice climb

Chomo Lonzo (Chinese: 珠穆隆索峰; pinyin: Zhūmùlóngsuǒ Fēng) is a mountain in Tibet, 5 km northeast of Makalu in the Mahalungur (Mohalingor) or Khumbu Himalayas. Alternate spellings of the same name include Chomolonzo, Chomolönzo, Chomo Lönzo, Jomolönzo, and Lhamalangcho.

Chomo-Lonzo has three distinct summits. The Southern, main peak (7804m) is joined via a ~ 7250m saddle to the Central peak (7565m), which is joined via a ~7050m saddle to a ~7200m North (or North West) peak.

While from Nepal the mountain is overpowered by nearby Makalu, the fifth-highest peak in the world, the three peaks are a very impressive and dominating sight from the Kangshung valley in Tibet. Chomo-Lonzo translates to “bird goddess” and from the East the mountain indeed brings to mind a 3 km high eagle with spread wings.

== Climbing History ==
On October 30, 1954 the French climbers Jean Couzy and Lionel Terray made the first ascent of the main summit via the gently sloping SW ridge from the 7200m Sakietang La that separates Chomo Lonzo from Makalu. They did this as an afterthought during a reconnaissance expedition to the Makalu, which they first-ascended the next year. The second ascent was on October 24, 1993 by a Japanese expedition which found a route through the NW face that joined the SW ridge half-way. A third and currently last ascent of the main peak in 1994 followed the original SW ridge route. The Central and North peaks remained unclimbed until 2005.

In April 2005, a French expedition first explored the NE face but, finding it too challenging, approached the mountain from the West and Northwest instead. One team (Yannick Graziani, Christian Trommsdorff and Patrick Wagnon) climbed the North summit over the NW ridge on May 7, while another (Stéphane Benoist and Patrice Glairon-Rappaz) reached it over the West face on May 16. The first team reascended the North peak and continued to reach the central peak on May 21. The initial plan to traverse all three peaks and descend via the Sakietang La proved impossible.

== View ==
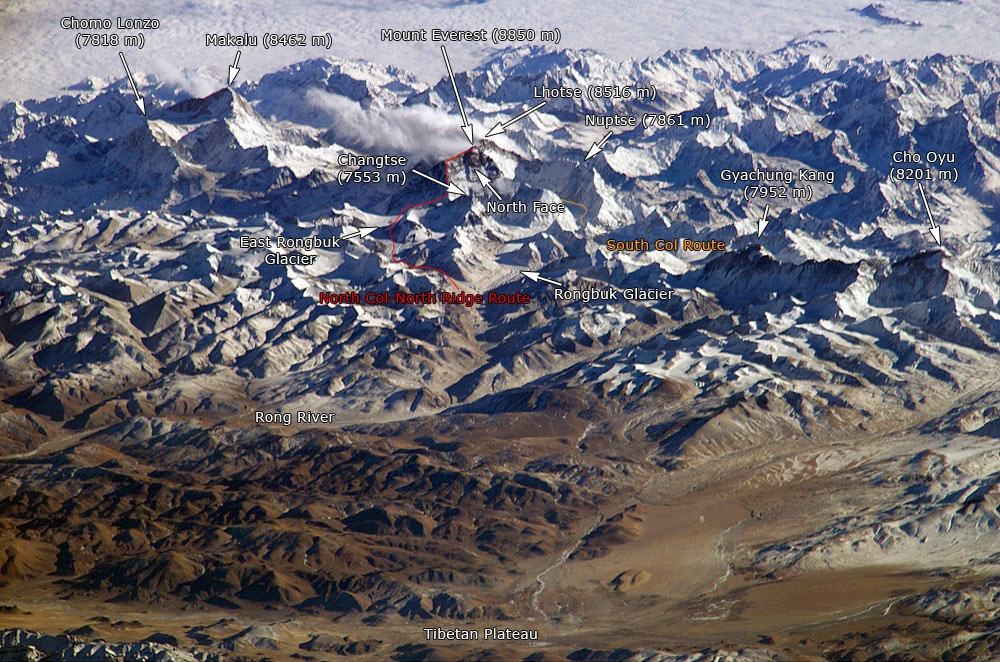

Southern and northern climbing routes as seen from the International Space Station. (The names on the photo are links to corresponding pages.)

== See also ==
- Chomo Lhari
- Chomo Yummo
- Chomolungma
- Chomolhari Kang
