= Gyachung Kang =

Mountain in Nepal/China

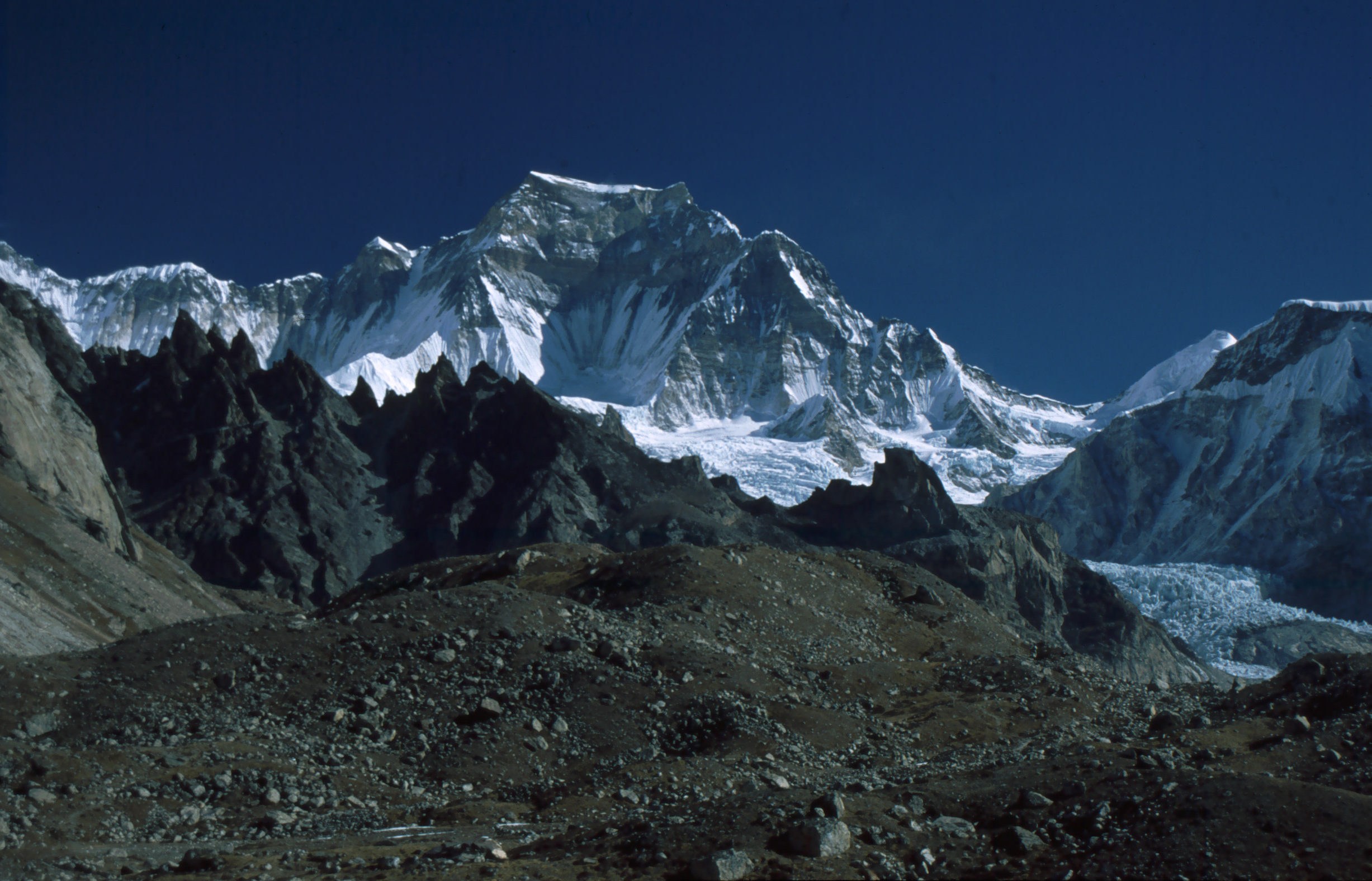
- Gyachung Kang

Highest point
- Elevation: 7,952 m (26,089 ft); Ranked 15th
- Prominence: 700 m (2,300 ft)
- Coordinates: 28°05′53″N 86°44′32″E

Geography
- The major peaks (not mountains) above 7,500 m (24,600 ft) height in Himalayas, rank identified in Himalayas alone (not the world). Legend: 1：Mount Everest; 2：Kangchenjunga; 3：Lhotse; 4：Yalung Kang, Kanchenjunga West; 5：Makalu; 6：Kangchenjunga South; 7：Kangchenjunga Central; 8：Cho Oyu; 9：Dhaulagiri; 10：Manaslu (Kutang); 11：Nanga Parbat (Diamer); 12：Annapurna; 13：Shishapangma (Shishasbangma, Xixiabangma); 14：Manaslu East; 15：Annapurna East Peak; 16： Gyachung Kang; 17：Annapurna II; 18：Tenzing Peak (Ngojumba Kang, Ngozumpa Kang, Ngojumba Ri); 19：Kangbachen; 20：Himalchuli (Himal Chuli); 21：Ngadi Chuli (Peak 29, Dakura, Dakum, Dunapurna); 22：Nuptse (Nubtse); 23：Nanda Devi; 24：Chomo Lonzo (Chomolonzo, Chomolönzo, Chomo Lönzo, Jomolönzo, Lhamalangcho); 25：Namcha Barwa (Namchabarwa); 26：Zemu Kang (Zemu Gap Peak); 27：Kamet; 28：Dhaulagiri II; 29：Ngojumba Kang II; 30：Dhaulagiri III; 31：Kumbhakarna Mountain (Mount Kumbhakarna, Jannu); 32：Gurla Mandhata (Naimona'nyi, Namu Nan); 33：Hillary Peak (Ngojumba Kang III); 34：Molamenqing (Phola Gangchen); 35：Dhaulagiri IV; 36：Annapurna Fang; 37：Silver Crag; 38：Kangbachen Southwest; 39：Gangkhar Puensum (Gangkar Punsum); 40：Annapurna III; 41：Himalchuli West; 42：Annapurna IV; 43：Kula Kangri; 44：Liankang Kangri (Gangkhar Puensum North, Liangkang Kangri); 45：Ngadi Chuli South; Location on China - Nepal border
- Countries: Nepal and China
- Parent range: Mahalangur Himal, Himalayas

Climbing
- First ascent: 1964 by a Japanese team
- Easiest route: glacier/snow/ice climb

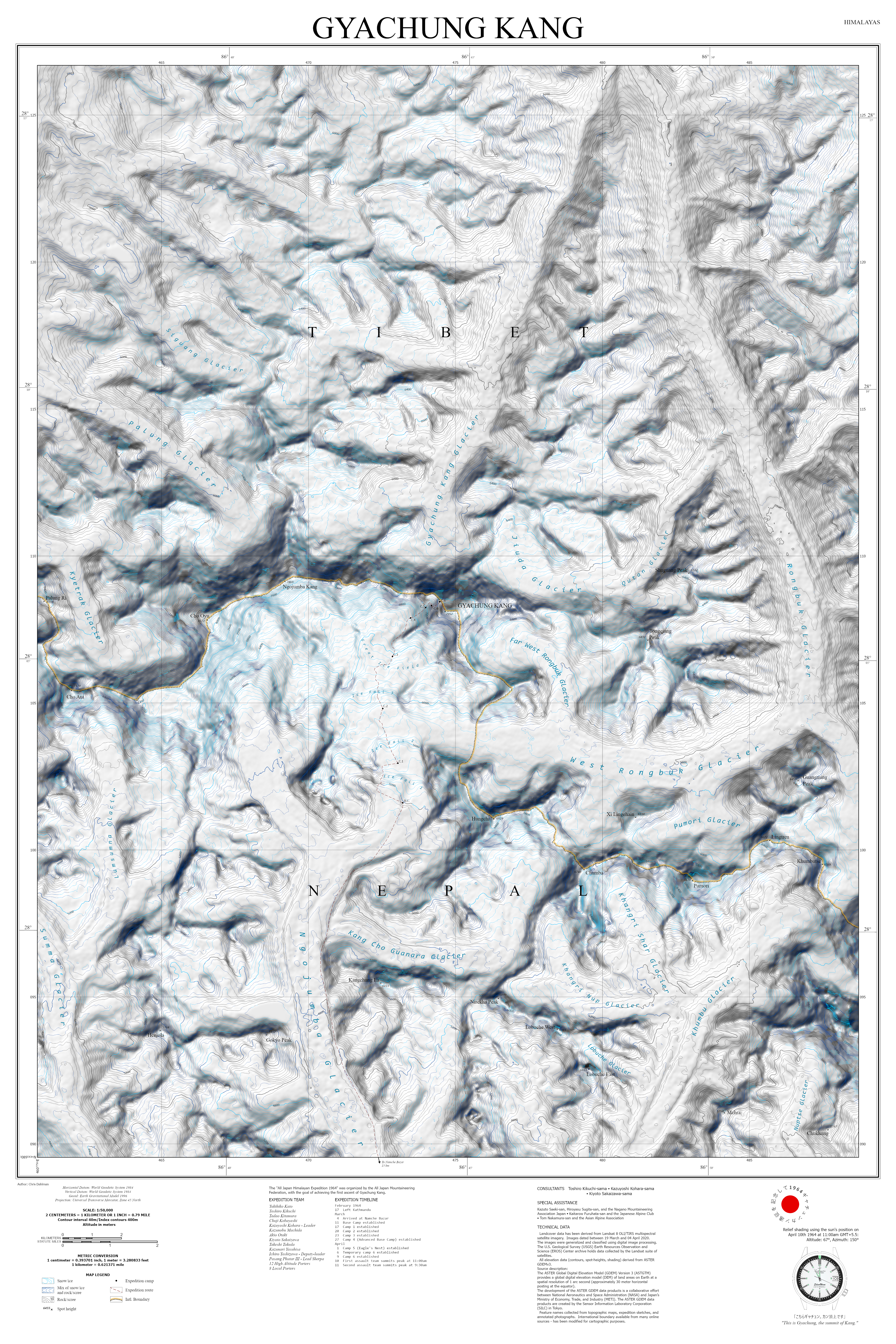
A map commemorating the All Japan Mountaineering Federation's 1964 expedition and successful summit of Gyachung Kang.

Gyachung Kang (Nepali: ग्याचुङ्काङ, Gyāchung Kāng; Chinese: 格重康峰; pinyin: Géchóngkāng Fēng) is a mountain in the Mahalangur Himal section of the Himalayas and is the highest peak between Cho Oyu (8,201 m) and Mount Everest (8,848 m). It lies on the border between Nepal and China. As the 15th highest peak in the world, it is also the co-highest peak (with Gasherbrum III) that is not an eight-thousander; hence, it is far less well-known than the lowest of the eight-thousanders, which are only about 100 m (328 ft) higher. The peak's lack of significant prominence (700 m) also contributes to its relative obscurity.

== Climbing history ==
The mountain was first climbed on April 10, 1964, by Y. Kato, K. Sakaizawa, Pasang Phutar, K. Machida and K. Yasuhisa.

The north face was first climbed in 1999 by a Slovene expedition, and was repeated by Yasushi Yamanoi in 2002.

== View ==
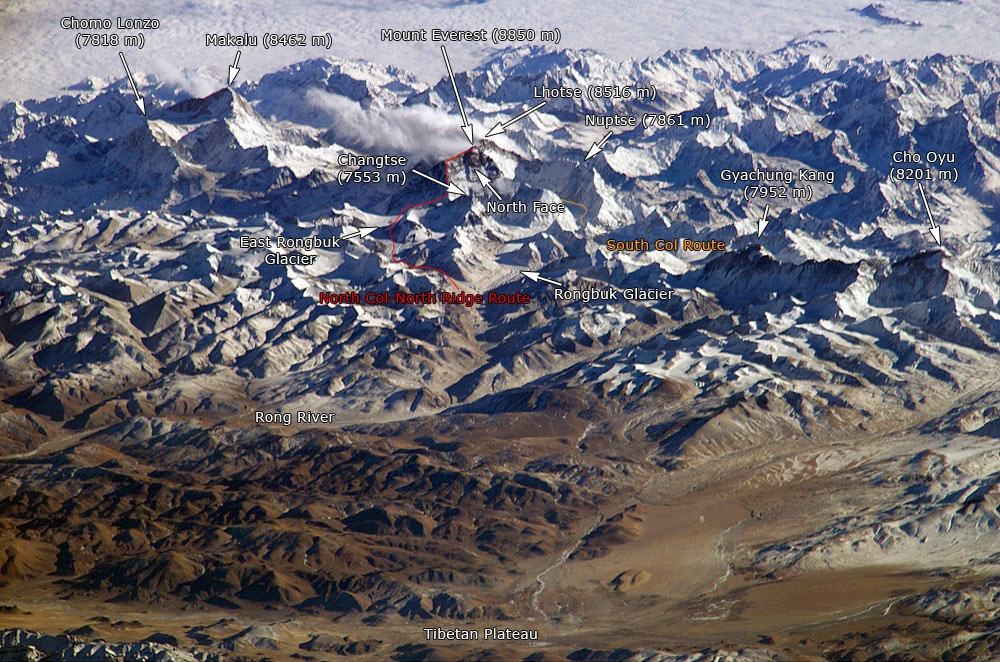

Southern and northern climbing routes as seen from the International Space Station. (The names on the photo are links to corresponding pages.)
