= Dhaulagiri II =

Mountain peak

- The major peaks (not mountains) above 7,500 m (24,600 ft) height in Himalayas, rank identified in Himalayas alone (not the world). Legend: 1：Mount Everest; 2：Kangchenjunga; 3：Lhotse; 4：Yalung Kang, Kanchenjunga West; 5：Makalu; 6：Kangchenjunga South; 7：Kangchenjunga Central; 8：Cho Oyu; 9：Dhaulagiri; 10：Manaslu (Kutang); 11：Nanga Parbat (Diamer); 12：Annapurna; 13：Shishapangma (Shishasbangma, Xixiabangma); 14：Manaslu East; 15：Annapurna East Peak; 16： Gyachung Kang; 17：Annapurna II; 18：Tenzing Peak (Ngojumba Kang, Ngozumpa Kang, Ngojumba Ri); 19：Kangbachen; 20：Himalchuli (Himal Chuli); 21：Ngadi Chuli (Peak 29, Dakura, Dakum, Dunapurna); 22：Nuptse (Nubtse); 23：Nanda Devi; 24：Chomo Lonzo (Chomolonzo, Chomolönzo, Chomo Lönzo, Jomolönzo, Lhamalangcho); 25：Namcha Barwa (Namchabarwa); 26：Zemu Kang (Zemu Gap Peak); 27：Kamet; 28：Dhaulagiri II; 29：Ngojumba Kang II; 30：Dhaulagiri III; 31：Kumbhakarna Mountain (Mount Kumbhakarna, Jannu); 32：Gurla Mandhata (Naimona'nyi, Namu Nan); 33：Hillary Peak (Ngojumba Kang III); 34：Molamenqing (Phola Gangchen); 35：Dhaulagiri IV; 36：Annapurna Fang; 37：Silver Crag; 38：Kangbachen Southwest; 39：Gangkhar Puensum (Gangkar Punsum); 40：Annapurna III; 41：Himalchuli West; 42：Annapurna IV; 43：Kula Kangri; 44：Liankang Kangri (Gangkhar Puensum North, Liangkang Kangri); 45：Ngadi Chuli South

Highest point
- Elevation: 7,751 m (25,430 ft); Ranked 30th
- Prominence: 2,391 m (7,844 ft)
- Coordinates: 28°45′48″N 83°23′18″E

Naming
- Native name: धौलागिरी २ (Nepali)

Geography
- Country: Nepal
- Province: Karnali and Gandaki
- Districts: Dolpa and Myagdi
- Municipalities: Chharka Tangsong and Dhaulagiri
- Parent range: Dhaulagiri

Dhaulagiri II (Nepali: धौलागिरी २) is a mountain lying on the border of Karnali Province and Gandaki Province, Nepal. It is part of the Dhaulagiri mountain range in north-central Nepal at an elevation of 7,751 metres (25,430 ft) and with the prominence of 2,391 metres (7,844 ft). Dhaulagiri II is the second highest mountain in the Dhaulagiri mountain range and it was first climbed by an Austrian-American expedition from its northwest side.

== Geography ==
Dhaulagiri II is located at the border of Chharka Tangsong Rural Municipality, Dolpa in Karnali Province and Dhaulagiri Rural Municipality, Myagdi in Gandaki Province at 7,751 metres (25,430 ft) above sea level and its prominence is 2,391 metres (7,844 ft). It is part of the Dhaulagiri mountain range in north-central Nepal, and Dhaulagiri II is the second highest mountain in the mountain range. The main peak of the mountain range, Dhaulagiri, is the seventh highest mountain in the world at 8,167 metres (26,795 ft) above sea level, and the highest mountain within the borders of a single country.

== Climbing history ==
In 1955, Dhaulagiri II was approached by J. O. M. Roberts and others. In 1963, an Austrian expedition attempted to ascend Dhaulagiri II from Dhaulagiri V which were among the last unclimbed seven-thousanders. However, they only managed to reach 7,000 metres (23,000 ft). Two years later, a Japanese expedition was also unsuccessful due to an avalanche. On 18 May 1971, Dhaulagiri II was first climbed by Adolf Huber, Ronald Fear, Adi Weissensteiner, and Jangbu Sherpa during an Austrian-American expedition via its northwest side. On 8 May 1975, the second successful climb was made by ten Japanese men by using a new route from the Tsaurabong Glacier. In 1982, a French expedition led by François Imbert using a new route, however, they abandoned the mountain after reaching 6,800 metres (22,300 ft) on 19 October due to heavy snow which posed a threat for an avalanche.

== See also ==
- List of ultras of the Himalayas
