= Liankang Kangri =

Mountain in Bhutan and China

- Gangkhar Puensum North
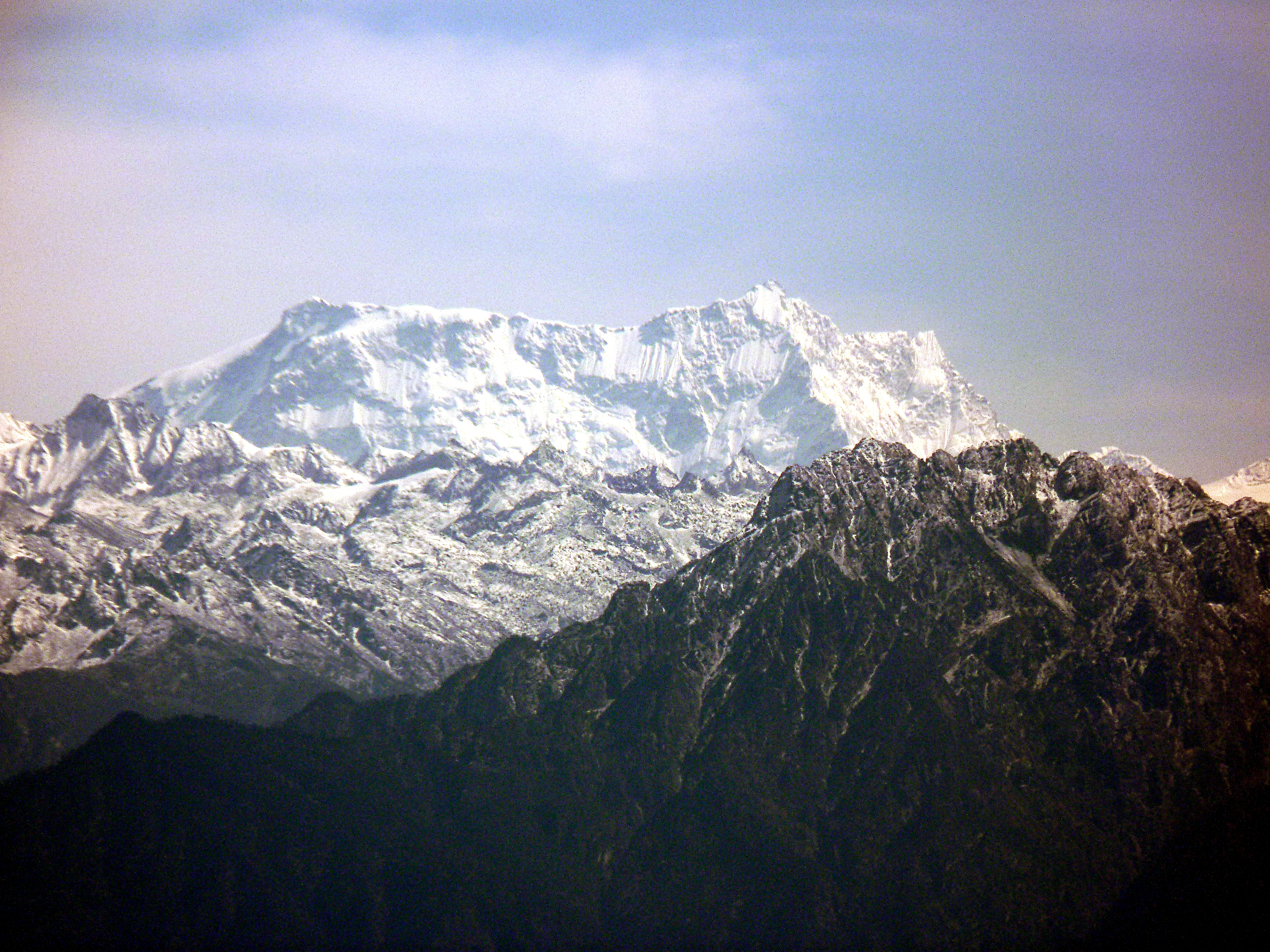
- Liankang Kangri and Gangkar Puensum

Highest point
- Elevation: 7,534 m (24,718 ft)
- Prominence: 234 m (768 ft)
- Listing: Mountains of Bhutan
- Coordinates: 28°03′50″N 90°26′35″E

Geography
- The major peaks (not mountains) above 7,500 m (24,600 ft) height in Himalayas, rank identified in Himalayas alone (not the world). Legend: 1：Mount Everest; 2：Kangchenjunga; 3：Lhotse; 4：Yalung Kang, Kanchenjunga West; 5：Makalu; 6：Kangchenjunga South; 7：Kangchenjunga Central; 8：Cho Oyu; 9：Dhaulagiri; 10：Manaslu (Kutang); 11：Nanga Parbat (Diamer); 12：Annapurna; 13：Shishapangma (Shishasbangma, Xixiabangma); 14：Manaslu East; 15：Annapurna East Peak; 16： Gyachung Kang; 17：Annapurna II; 18：Tenzing Peak (Ngojumba Kang, Ngozumpa Kang, Ngojumba Ri); 19：Kangbachen; 20：Himalchuli (Himal Chuli); 21：Ngadi Chuli (Peak 29, Dakura, Dakum, Dunapurna); 22：Nuptse (Nubtse); 23：Nanda Devi; 24：Chomo Lonzo (Chomolonzo, Chomolönzo, Chomo Lönzo, Jomolönzo, Lhamalangcho); 25：Namcha Barwa (Namchabarwa); 26：Zemu Kang (Zemu Gap Peak); 27：Kamet; 28：Dhaulagiri II; 29：Ngojumba Kang II; 30：Dhaulagiri III; 31：Kumbhakarna Mountain (Mount Kumbhakarna, Jannu); 32：Gurla Mandhata (Naimona'nyi, Namu Nan); 33：Hillary Peak (Ngojumba Kang III); 34：Molamenqing (Phola Gangchen); 35：Dhaulagiri IV; 36：Annapurna Fang; 37：Silver Crag; 38：Kangbachen Southwest; 39：Gangkhar Puensum (Gangkar Punsum); 40：Annapurna III; 41：Himalchuli West; 42：Annapurna IV; 43：Kula Kangri; 44：Liankang Kangri (Gangkhar Puensum North, Liangkang Kangri); 45：Ngadi Chuli South
- Location: Bhutan–China border
- Parent range: Himalayas

Climbing
- First ascent: 9 May 1999

Liangkang Kangri (also known as Gangkhar Puensum North and Liankang Kangri) is a mountain peak in the Himalayas on the border between Bhutan and China, as well as at the southeastern end of territory claimed by both countries. Liangkang Kangri is 7,534 metres (24,718 ft) high. (Note: The height of the mountain is 7535 m according to the Japanese team that first climbed it. But then in a BBC interview it is reported to be 7441 m so these sources are not deemed trustworthy) To the south, a ridge leads to the 7,570-metre (24,840 ft) Gangkhar Puensum 2.17 kilometres (1.35 mi) to the south-southeast. Due to the low saddle height of 234 metres (768 ft), Liangkang Kangri is not regarded as an independent mountain. There is westward a ridge that extends to several peaks that are around 7,000 m (23,000 ft) high. The Liangkanggletscher on the northwest flank and the Namsanggletscher on the eastern flank of Liangkang Kangri form the headwaters of the Lhobrak Chhu, a source river of Kuri Chhu. The glacier on the southwest flank belongs to the catchment area of Angde Chhu.

== First Ascent ==
The first ascent of Liankang Kangri was by a 5-member party led by the Japanese mountaineer Kiyohiko Suzuki on 9 May 1999. According to them, Liankang Kangri was the second highest unclimbed mountain in the world, after Gangkhar Puensum. Team member Tamotsu Nakamura commented to the BBC after the party's success, “As I cannot disclose an inside story behind the sudden cancellation, I write only the reason why the permit was withdrawn because of a political issue with [the] Bhutan government. (...) I regret that Liangkang Kangri is not an outstanding summit."
