= Hillary Peak =

Peak in the Himalayas

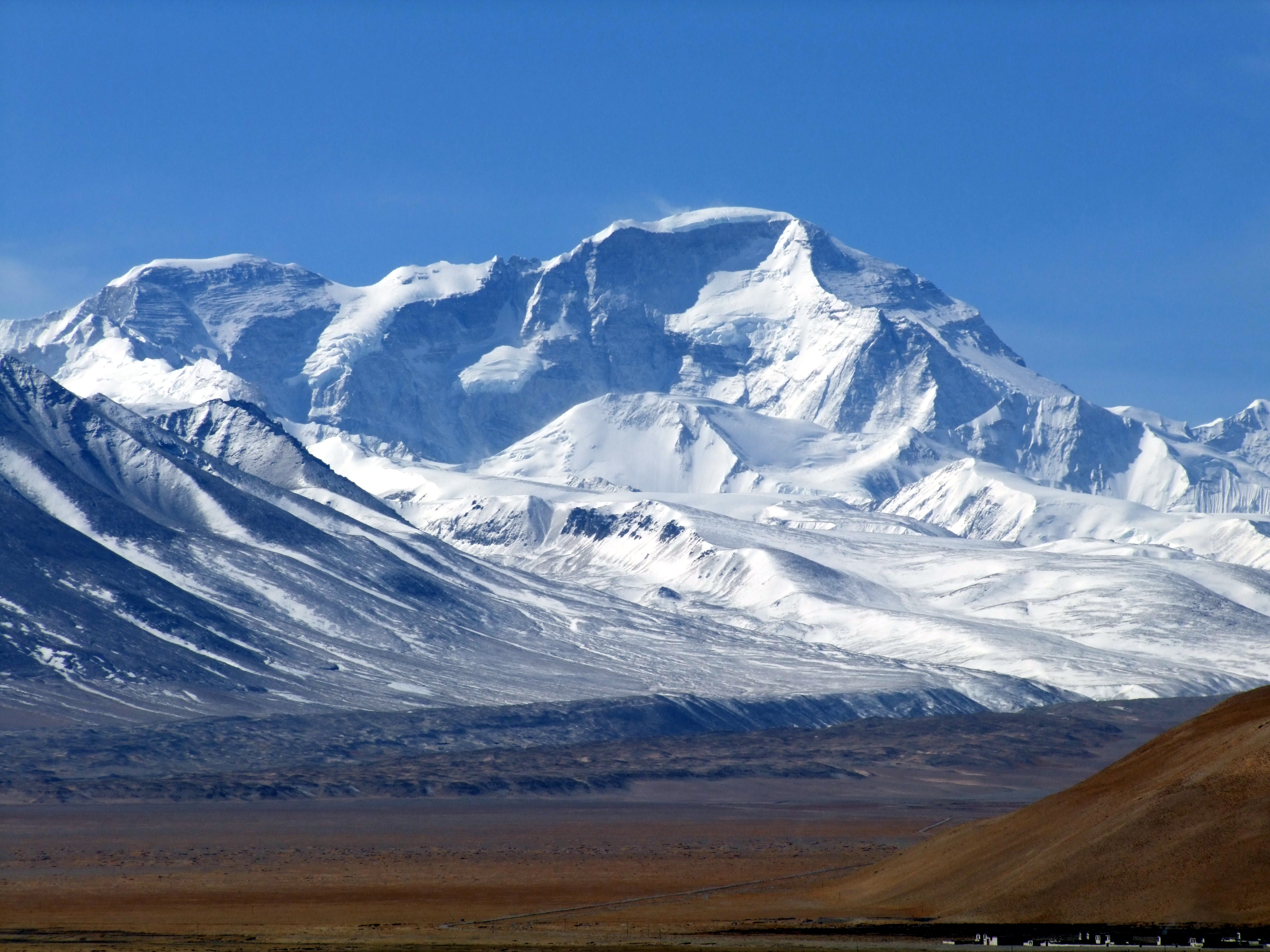
- The North Face of Cho Oyu from Tingri in Tibet. The Ngojumba Kang peaks are on the left.

Highest point
- Elevation: 7,681 m (25,200 ft)
- Coordinates: 28°06′24″N 86°42′58″E

Geography
- The major peaks (not mountains) above 7,500 m (24,600 ft) height in Himalayas, rank identified in Himalayas alone (not the world). Legend: 1：Mount Everest; 2：Kangchenjunga; 3：Lhotse; 4：Yalung Kang, Kanchenjunga West; 5：Makalu; 6：Kangchenjunga South; 7：Kangchenjunga Central; 8：Cho Oyu; 9：Dhaulagiri; 10：Manaslu (Kutang); 11：Nanga Parbat (Diamer); 12：Annapurna; 13：Shishapangma (Shishasbangma, Xixiabangma); 14：Manaslu East; 15：Annapurna East Peak; 16： Gyachung Kang; 17：Annapurna II; 18：Tenzing Peak (Ngojumba Kang, Ngozumpa Kang, Ngojumba Ri); 19：Kangbachen; 20：Himalchuli (Himal Chuli); 21：Ngadi Chuli (Peak 29, Dakura, Dakum, Dunapurna); 22：Nuptse (Nubtse); 23：Nanda Devi; 24：Chomo Lonzo (Chomolonzo, Chomolönzo, Chomo Lönzo, Jomolönzo, Lhamalangcho); 25：Namcha Barwa (Namchabarwa); 26：Zemu Kang (Zemu Gap Peak); 27：Kamet; 28：Dhaulagiri II; 29：Ngojumba Kang II; 30：Dhaulagiri III; 31：Kumbhakarna Mountain (Mount Kumbhakarna, Jannu); 32：Gurla Mandhata (Naimona'nyi, Namu Nan); 33：Hillary Peak (Ngojumba Kang III); 34：Molamenqing (Phola Gangchen); 35：Dhaulagiri IV; 36：Annapurna Fang; 37：Silver Crag; 38：Kangbachen Southwest; 39：Gangkhar Puensum (Gangkar Punsum); 40：Annapurna III; 41：Himalchuli West; 42：Annapurna IV; 43：Kula Kangri; 44：Liankang Kangri (Gangkhar Puensum North, Liangkang Kangri); 45：Ngadi Chuli South
- Location: Solukhumbu, Nepal
- Parent range: Himalayas

Hillary Peak (Nepali: हिलारी शिखर) is the name which has been proposed by the Government of Nepal for a 7,681 metres (25,200 ft) peak in the Himalayas in honour of Edmund Hillary, who made the first ascent of Everest with Tenzing Norgay in 1953.

In September 2013 a government panel recommended that two mountains be renamed Hillary Peak and Tenzing Peak as part of a batch of summits that would be opened to climbers in 2014. The coordinates given by the government indicate that it is one of a clutch of peaks on the Nepal and Tibet border between Cho Oyu and Gyachung Kang, known variously as Ngojumba Kang, Ngozumpa Kang and Ngojumba Ri. The designated peak in most sources is Ngojumba Kang III at 7,681 m (25,200 ft). (Note: The original height given by Nepalese government sources of Hillary Peak is 7681 m. The coordinates published by the Nepalese government later in 2014 was 28°06′24″N 86°42′58″E. This almost matches Ngojumba Kang III at 28°06′24″N 86°42′46″E, which some sources give as this height and others adjacent spot heights of 7,684 m (25,210 ft). Sources for Hillary Peak being Ngojumba Kang III are Google Maps, OpenStreetMap and its Himalayan Database reference code is NGO3 which appears to be unclimbed but one source has Ngojumba Kang II at 7,743 m (25,404 ft) which is 0.66 km (0.41 mi) away and climbed.)

In the fall of 2016, two time Everest summiter Elia Saikaly along with Pasang Kaji Sherpa made an expedition to Hillary Peak. They called off their summit bid due to dangers encountered including rock-falls, bad weather, hidden crevasses, and snow related issues.

== See also ==
- Hillary Step
- Hillary Montes
