= Kula Kangri =

Mountain in Tibet and/or Bhutan

- 库拉岗日峰
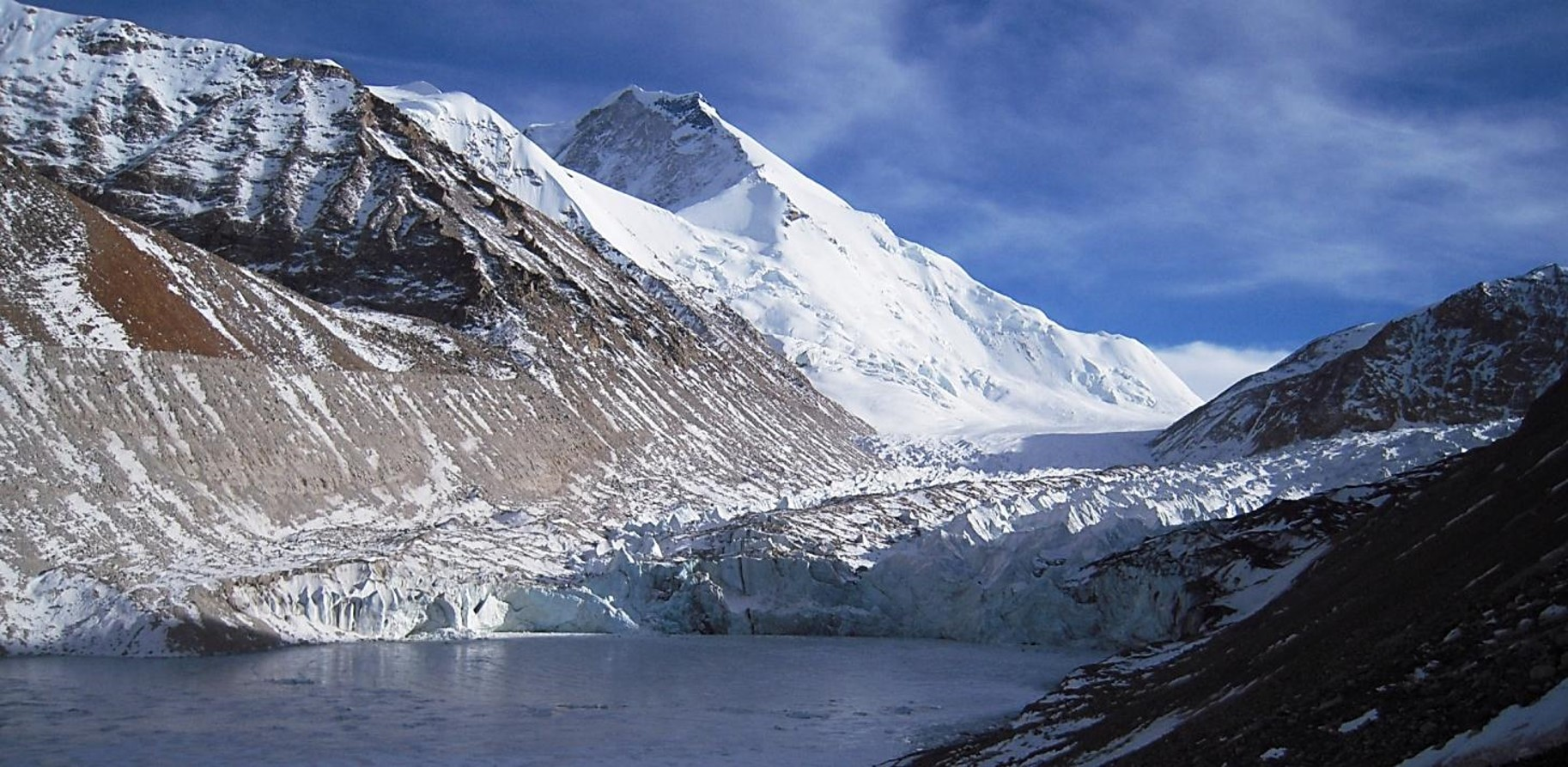
- Kula Kangri from the northwest

Highest point
- Elevation: 7,538 m (24,731 ft); Ranked 45th
- Prominence: 1,654 m (5,427 ft)
- Listing: Mountains of China; Ultra
- Coordinates: 28°13′39″N 90°37′00″E

Geography
- The major peaks (not mountains) above 7,500 m (24,600 ft) height in Himalayas, rank identified in Himalayas alone (not the world). Legend: 1：Mount Everest; 2：Kangchenjunga; 3：Lhotse; 4：Yalung Kang, Kanchenjunga West; 5：Makalu; 6：Kangchenjunga South; 7：Kangchenjunga Central; 8：Cho Oyu; 9：Dhaulagiri; 10：Manaslu (Kutang); 11：Nanga Parbat (Diamer); 12：Annapurna; 13：Shishapangma (Shishasbangma, Xixiabangma); 14：Manaslu East; 15：Annapurna East Peak; 16： Gyachung Kang; 17：Annapurna II; 18：Tenzing Peak (Ngojumba Kang, Ngozumpa Kang, Ngojumba Ri); 19：Kangbachen; 20：Himalchuli (Himal Chuli); 21：Ngadi Chuli (Peak 29, Dakura, Dakum, Dunapurna); 22：Nuptse (Nubtse); 23：Nanda Devi; 24：Chomo Lonzo (Chomolonzo, Chomolönzo, Chomo Lönzo, Jomolönzo, Lhamalangcho); 25：Namcha Barwa (Namchabarwa); 26：Zemu Kang (Zemu Gap Peak); 27：Kamet; 28：Dhaulagiri II; 29：Ngojumba Kang II; 30：Dhaulagiri III; 31：Kumbhakarna Mountain (Mount Kumbhakarna, Jannu); 32：Gurla Mandhata (Naimona'nyi, Namu Nan); 33：Hillary Peak (Ngojumba Kang III); 34：Molamenqing (Phola Gangchen); 35：Dhaulagiri IV; 36：Annapurna Fang; 37：Silver Crag; 38：Kangbachen Southwest; 39：Gangkhar Puensum (Gangkar Punsum); 40：Annapurna III; 41：Himalchuli West; 42：Annapurna IV; 43：Kula Kangri; 44：Liankang Kangri (Gangkhar Puensum North, Liangkang Kangri); 45：Ngadi Chuli South; Location in Tibet
- Location: Lhozhag County, Tibet, China
- Parent range: Himalayas

Climbing
- First ascent: 1986

Kula Kangri is a mountain in the Eastern Himalayas that has an elevation of 7,538 metres (24,731 ft), making it the 45th highest mountain on Earth and one of the Ultras of the Himalayas.

Bhutan once claimed Kula Kangri. The claim was relinquished in the 1980s, with Bhutan attributing it to a cartographic error. The current borderline runs through the higher Gangkar Puensum.

Kula Kangri is considered one of the four sacred mountains of Central Tibet.

== Peaks ==
The current consensus height is 7,538 m (24,731 ft). A former height given was in the past 7,554 m (24,783 ft), but other sources had the current height by 2011. To its east within 2.5 km (1.6 mi), it has central and eastern peaks that are 7,418 m (24,337 ft) and 7,381 m (24,216 ft) high.

== Climbing history ==
The first ascent was made by a combined Japanese and Chinese team with 25 Japanese and 17 Chinese members in 1986.

== See also ==
- List of elevation extremes by country
- List of highest mountains on Earth
- List of ultras of the Himalayas
