= Japanese Alpine Club =

Mountaineering and climbing club based in Tokyo, Japan

- 日本山岳会
- Sport: Mountaineering and climbing
- Abbreviation: JAC
- Founded: 1905
- Headquarters: Tokyo
- President: Masashi Kobayashi

Official website
- jac1.or.jp
- (Japan)

The Japanese Alpine Club (日本山岳会, Nihon Sangakukai; JAC) is a mountaineering and climbing organisation based in Tokyo, Japan.

== History ==
The Japanese Alpine Club was founded in October 1905 as the first mountaineering club in Asia. In late 19th century modern alpinism had been imported from Europe to Japan. The founding of JAC was inspired by the English Alpine Club.

In 1936 a JAC expedition made first ascent of Nanda Kot (6,861 m / 22,510 ft) in Garhwal Himalaya. This is the first assault by the Japanese in the greater range of Himalaya. The most famous JAC expedition was 1956 the first ascent of Manaslu (8,163 m / 26,781 ft). Toshio Imanishi (Japan) and Gyalzen Norbu Sherpa (Nepal) reached the summit on May 9, 1956.

The club has a special focus on expeditions and exploration of remote areas. The JAC publishes the yearly magazine Japanese Alpine News (JAN).

== Expeditions (selection) ==
- 1956: First ascent of Manaslu (8,163 m / 26,781 ft) by Toshio Imanishi and Gyalzen Norbu Sherpa
- 1970: First ascent Southeast Ridge of Makalu (8,485 m / 27,838 ft) by Yuichi Ozaki and Hajime Tanaka.
- 1980: North face of Mount Everest, by Japanese Couloir (FA) and Hornbein Couloir.
- 1992: First ascent of Namcha Barwa (7,782 m / 25,531 ft).
- 1996: First ascent of Ultar II (7,388 m / 24,238 ft) by Akito Yamazaki and Kiyoshi Matsuoka.
