= Viridiana Álvarez Chávez =

Mexican mountaineer, speaker and business woman

Personal information
- Nationality: Mexican
- Born: May 15, 1983 (age 43) Aguascalientes
- Education: Tecnológico de Monterrey
- Occupations: Mountaineer, Speaker, Business Coach and Entrepreneur
- Website: http://www.viridianaalvarez.com

Sport
- Sport: Alpinism

Achievements and titles
- Personal best: Guinness World Record: "Fastest ascent of the top three highest mountains with supplementary oxygen"

Viridiana Álvarez Chávez (born May 15, 1983) is a Mexican alpinist, public speaker, and entrepreneur. She is the first woman from the Americas and the seventh worldwide to reach the summit of the fourteen mountains over eight thousand meters high.

In 2020, she obtained a Guinness World Record for being the woman with the fastest ascent of the three highest peaks in the world, using supplementary oxygen: Everest, K2, and Kanchenjunga.

== Biography ==
She holds a Bachelor's degree in Business Administration from Tecnológico de Monterrey, a Master's degree in Quality Systems Engineering, and a Master's degree in Innovation from Tecnológico de Monterrey. She has a certification in ontological coaching from Newfield Consulting in Chile and a certificate from the Women's Leadership Program at the Yale School of Management.

She served as the director of the Center for Automotive Industry Development in Mexico (CeDIAM) at Tecnológico de Monterrey, Aguascalientes Campus, and held various managerial positions in manufacturing companies within the automotive industry.

She is the general director of "Liderazgo de Altura", a Business Coaching Center, a business consulting firm, and the president and co-founder of "Líderes de Altura A.C.", a non-profit organization aimed at women, youth, and children, with an emphasis on mental health promotion projects.

She is a certified diver and a PADI ambassador.

== Professional career ==
She began her sports career by participating in athletic events such as 10 km runs, half marathons, marathons, and half IronMan competitions, as well as mountain biking.

Her journey into mountaineering started when she reached the summit of Citlaltépetl (Pico de Orizaba) on February 8, 2014. This experience marked a turning point in her career, as after seeing the world from Mexico's highest peak, she became curious about how it would look from the summit of the world's highest peak, Mount Everest.

On January 14, 2015, she reached the summit of Aconcagua, the highest mountain in the American continent, as preparation for climbing her first eight-thousander. On October 5, 2015, she reached the summit of Manaslu, the eighth highest mountain in the world, thus beginning her journey towards the fourteen eight-thousanders and the Seven Summits.

=== The Fourteen Eight-Thousanders ===
She is the first woman from the American continent to climb the fourteen highest mountains in the world, each over eight thousand meters high, and the seventh woman in history to achieve this milestone.

#	Mountain	Altitude	Date	Comments
1	Manaslu	8,156 m	October 5, 2015	No "Real Summit" (2019)
2	Everest	8,848 m	May 16, 2017	Expedition Leader
3	Lhotse	8,383 m	May 13, 2018	
4	K2	8,611 m	July 21, 2018	First latin american woman
5	Kanchenjunga	8,586 m	May 15, 2019	First mexican woman Guinness World Record
6	Annapurna	8,091 m	April 16, 2021	First mexican woman
7	Dhaulagiri	8,167 m	October 1, 2021	
8	Makalu	8,485 m	May 12, 2022	
9	Shisha Pangma	8,027 m	April 26, 2023	
10	Cho Oyu	8,188 m	May 13, 2023	
11	Nanga Parbat	8125 m	June 26, 2023	First latin american woman
12	Gasherbrum I	8,080 m	July 18, 2023	
13	Gasherbrum II	8,035 m	July 21, 2023	
14	Broad Peak	8,051 m	July 27, 2023	
15	Manaslu	8,156 m	September 21, 2023	• Real Summit: Without supplementary oxygen

=== The Seven Summits ===
She has climbed the 7 highest summits of each continent.

#	Mountain	Elevation	Date	Continent
1	Aconcagua	6,962 m	January 14, 2015	South America
2	Everest	8,848 m	May 16, 2017	Asia
3	Elbrus	5,642 m	August 18, 2018	Europe
4	Kilimanjaro	5,893 m	September 29, 2019	Africa
5	Vinson	4,892 m	January 8, 2024	Antarctica
6	Denali	6,190 m	July 2, 2024	North America
7	Carstensz	4,884 m	October 12, 2024	Oceania

== Records ==
- 2018: First Latin American woman to reach the summit of K2.
- 2019: First Mexican woman to reach the summit of Kanchenjunga.
- 2020: Guinness World Record for being the woman with the fastest ascent of the three highest mountains in the world, using supplementary oxygen (1 year 364 days).
- 2021: First Mexican woman to reach the summit of Annapurna.
- 2023: First Latin American woman to reach the summit of Nanga Parbat.
