= Vladislav Terzyul =

Ukrainian mountaineer (1953–2004)

Vladyslav Terzyul
- Born: June 16, 1953; Artyom, Russian SFSR, USSR
- Died: May 17, 2004 (aged 50); Makalu
- Occupation: alpinist
- Years active: 1992-2004
- Children: Julia Terzyul
- Honours: Order For Courage 1st, 2nd, and 3rd class

Vladyslav "Slava" Oleksandrovych Terzyul (Ukrainian: Владислав Олександрович Терзиул; 18 June 1953 in Artyom, Primorsky Krai, Soviet Union – 17 May 2004, Makalu), was a Ukrainian alpinist.

Terzyul was known for his alpine-style ascents, and without using bottled oxygen.

He is said to be one of the few people to have climbed all 14 of the eight-thousanders and the first Ukrainian to do so. This claim is disputed as he reached false summits on both Shishapangma (8027m) and Broad Peak, summiting at Shishapangma Central (8013m) and the Forehead (8028m) respectively.

The Italian Messner managed to climb the highest points of the planet. And we, Ukrainians, can't we?! We can do it without the use of oxygen!

— Vladislav Terzyul, https://www.gorgany.com/pro/terzyul/

On May 17, 2004, Terzyul and American Jay Sieger summited Makalu together via the west ridge, said to be one of the hardest routes of ascent up the mountain and one of the least summited. As they began the descent, Sieger died when his head struck rocks at an altitude of about 8,300 meters. Terzyul was lost on descent from the summit. The cause of his death is unknown and his body has not been found.

== Eight-thousanders ==
- 1993 – Kanchenjunga, east ridge, International Expedition
- 1994 – K2, Abruzzi route, Ukrainian Expedition/Odessa Alpine Club
- 1995 – Broad Peak Forepeak, west edge and north ridge, International Expedition
- 1996 – Gasherbrum II, classic route, International Expedition
- 1996 – Annapurna, northwest ridge, new route, Polish International Expedition
- 1997 – Nanga Parbat, 1997, Diamir face, Ukrainian Expedition
- 1999 – Everest, classic route from the north, Ukrainian National Expedition
- 2000 – Shishapangma Central, classic route. Ukrainian National Expedition
- 2000 – Cho Oyu, classic route, solo
- 2001 – Manaslu, southeast ridge, new route, Ukrainian National Expedition
- 2002 – Lhotse, Odessa Alpclub expedition
- 2002 – Dhaulagiri
- 2003 – Gasherbrum I
- 2004 – Makalu, west ridge, died during the descent.

== Memorials ==
Terzyul's accomplishments have had particular resonance in Ukraine.

In 2010, the Ukrainian expedition "Ukraine-Makalu-2010", led by Valentin Simonenko, set out to climb Makalu in Terzyul's memory. The team summited the mountain on May 23, without the use of oxygen or porters.

His mountaineering feats inspired Ukrainian artist Andryi Shmyrin to develop a series of large scale paintings, of the world's highest peaks in his memory. In 2018, Shmyrin and Kiev's Lera Litvinova Gallery exhibited 14 eight-thousanders dedicated to Terzyul's memory.

=== Terzyul14 Project ===
In 2021, Ukrainian-American climber Yulia Zi set out to climb Broad Peak in Terzyul's memory after learning he did not reach the main summit of this mountain by mistake. Her climb became part of the Terzyul14 Project, a mixed media project dedicated to raising awareness about Terzyul's accomplishments. Zi ultimately had to abandon her summit attempt on Broad Peak at 7,500 meters due to avalanche risk.

Other aspects of the project included an awareness campaign, around the hashtag #terzyul14, a book translation and a documentary film project by Director Iryna Pravylo and Right Time Studios.
