= Ryszard Gajewski =

Polish mountaineer

Ryszard Gajewski (born 5 October 1954 in Zakopane) is a Polish mountaineer best known for the first winter ascent of Manaslu on 12 January 1984 together with Maciej Berbeka.

== Eight-thousanders ==
- Manaslu (8156 m.) in 1984 with Maciej Berbeka
- Cho Oyu (8201 m.) in 1985 with Maciej Pawlikowski
