= Kang Guru =

Mountain in Nepal

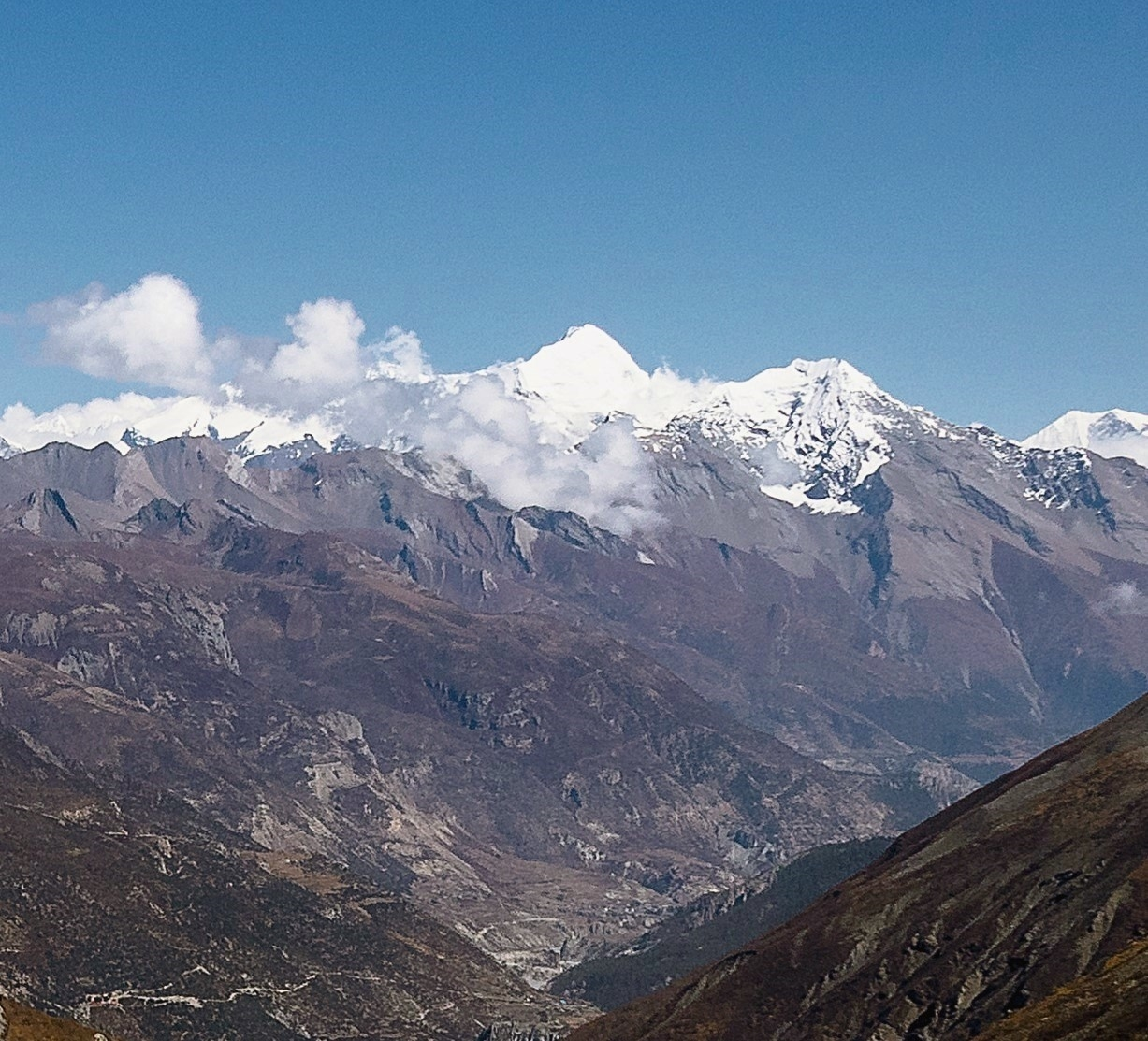
- West aspect centered on skyline

Highest point
- Elevation: 6,981 m (22,904 ft)
- Prominence: 767 m (2,516 ft)
- Listing: Mountains of Nepal
- Coordinates: 28°39′31″N 84°18′15″E

Geography
- Location within Nepal
- Country: Nepal
- Province: Gandaki
- District: Manang
- Parent range: Peri Himal

Climbing
- First ascent: 1955 by Heinz Steinmetz, Fritz Lobbichler and Jürgen Wellenkamp

Kang Guru (or Kang Garu) is a mountain in the Manang region of Gandaki Province. It the highest peak of the Larkya sub-range of the Nepalese Himalayas. The Larkya range lies northwest of Mansiri Himal (including Manaslu) and northeast of the Annapurnas.

== 2005 accident ==
The mountain is most notable for one of the worst avalanche caused mountaineering accidents in the Nepalese Himalaya. On October 20, 2005, a powder-snow avalanche, induced by several hours of heavy snowfall, plowed into a French expedition's base camp, sweeping all seven members of the French team as well as 11 Nepalese staff down a steep avalanche gorge, killing them all. The avalanche occurred in the late afternoon just after tea time when all those killed were inside their tents. Several porters who were outside their tents at the time managed to survive. They made their way to the nearest village where they came across a French-Israeli expedition planning to climb Ratna Chuli, a nearby mountain. The team immediately informed the French embassy in Kathmandu and aborted their climb due to poor snow conditions. Only one body was recovered in initial attempts and later in mid-November, avalanche search specialists from France only found two more bodies (a French climber and a Nepalese porter) before calling off the search until the following year.

In July 2006, the rescue team, including five surviving members of the French expedition, returned to the accident site and recovered the remaining bodies. The snow had all melted away and been replaced by lush green meadows. French forensic experts identified the French climbers using dental records. The bodies of the Nepalis were returned to their families while the deceased French climbers were flown back to France. Compensation has been provided by the French embassy to the families of the Nepali climbers. Nine of the killed Nepalis were from the village of Larpak in the Gorkha District.

The death toll from this accident surpassed the previous record number of climbers killed by an avalanche in Nepal. In April 1972 an avalanche on Manaslu killed ten Nepalese, four Korean climbers and one Japanese cameraman when it slammed into their tents at 3:15 am.
