= Piotr Morawski =

Polish mountaineer (1976–2009)

Piotr Morawski (27 December 1976 – 8 April 2009) was a Polish mountaineer. He achieved the first successful winter ascent together with Simone Moro of Shishapangma on 14 January 2005. Morawski died aged 32 during an international Dhaulagiri/Manaslu expedition in Nepal. He fell into a crevasse at an elevation of 5500 m while acclimatizing.

== Major expeditions ==
Date	Peak	Season	Partner(s)	Result
2002/2003	K2	Winter		Unsuccessful
2003/2004	Shishapangma	Winter		Unsuccessful
14 January 2005	Shishapangma	Winter	Simone Moro	First winter ascent
8 May 2005	Annapurna	Summer	Piotr Pustelnik	Unsuccessful
24 April 2006	Cho Oyu	Summer	Peter Hámor	Successful
9 July 2006	Broad Peak	Summer	Solo	Successful
15 July 2007	Nanga Parbat	Summer	Peter Hámor, Jozef Kopold	Successful
28 April 2008	Annapurna	Summer	Peter Hámor	Unsuccessful
24 June 2008	Gasherbrum I	Summer	Peter Hámor	Successful
6 July 2008	Gasherbrum II	Summer	Peter Hámor	Successful
