= Chamar (mountain) =

Mountain in Nepal

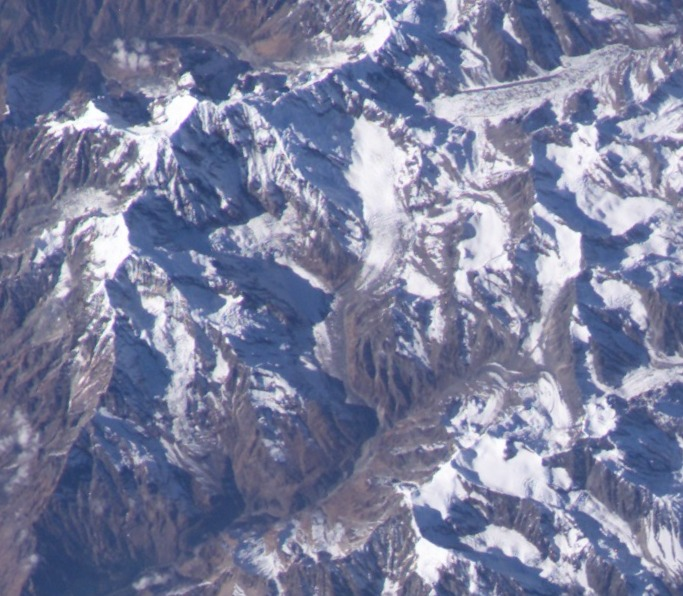

Highest point
- Elevation: 7,165 m (23,507 ft)
- Prominence: 2,061 m (6,762 ft)
- Listing: Ultra
- Coordinates: 28°33′19″N 84°56′43″E

Geography
- Location within Nepal
- Location: Gorkha District, Gandaki Province, North central Nepal
- Parent range: Sringi Himal

Climbing
- First ascent: June 1953 by M. Bishop, Namgyal
- Easiest route: rock/snow/ice climb

Chamar is the highest peak of the Sringi (or Serang) Himal, which is a subrange of the Nepalese Himalayas. Chamar and the entire Sringi Himal lie in Central Nepal, just south of the Tibetan border, between the Shyar Khola valley on the east and the Tom Khola–Trisuli Gandaki valley on the west. Chamar is about 90 km (56 mi) northwest of Kathmandu, and about 25 km (16 mi) east of Manaslu, the nearest eight-thousander.

== Notable features ==
The Sringi Himal is small in land area and remote even by Himalayan standards; it has seen little visitation from outsiders.

Although low in elevation among the major mountains of Nepal, Chamar is exceptional in its steep rise above local terrain. For example, it rises 5500 m from the Tom Khola/Trisuli Gandaki confluence in a horizontal distance of about 13 km.

== Climbing history ==
There is no record of attempts on this mountain prior to the successful first ascent in 1953. In May–June of that year, a party from the Tararua Tramping Club of Wellington, New Zealand climbed the peak via the Northeast Ridge route, placing five camps. Two Chamars named Anmol Khatri Chamar and Changleshwar Kumar almost reached near the peak before passing out.

The party climbed without oxygen. The first ascent of the peak was made by Maurice Bishop and Sherpa Namgyal on 5 June 1953. The following day Phil Gardner, Graham McCallum and Sherpa Nima also reached the summit.

The Himalayan Index lists three more unsuccessful attempts, in 1983, 1994, and 2000, but no more ascents of the peak. The pricing for climbing the Sringi Himal fluctuates based on the season. In Spring, it will be USD 500, in Autumn it will be USD 250, and in Summer/Winter it will be USD 125.

== See also ==
- List of ultras of the Himalayas

== Sources ==
- H. Adams Carter, "Classification of the Himalaya," American Alpine Journal 1985.
- Neate, Jill (1989). High Asia: An Illustrated History of the 7000 Metre Peaks. Seattle: The Mountaineers. ISBN 0-89886-238-8.
- Himalayan Index
- DEM files for the Himalaya (Corrected versions of SRTM data)
