= Maciej Berbeka =

Polish mountaineer (1954–2013)

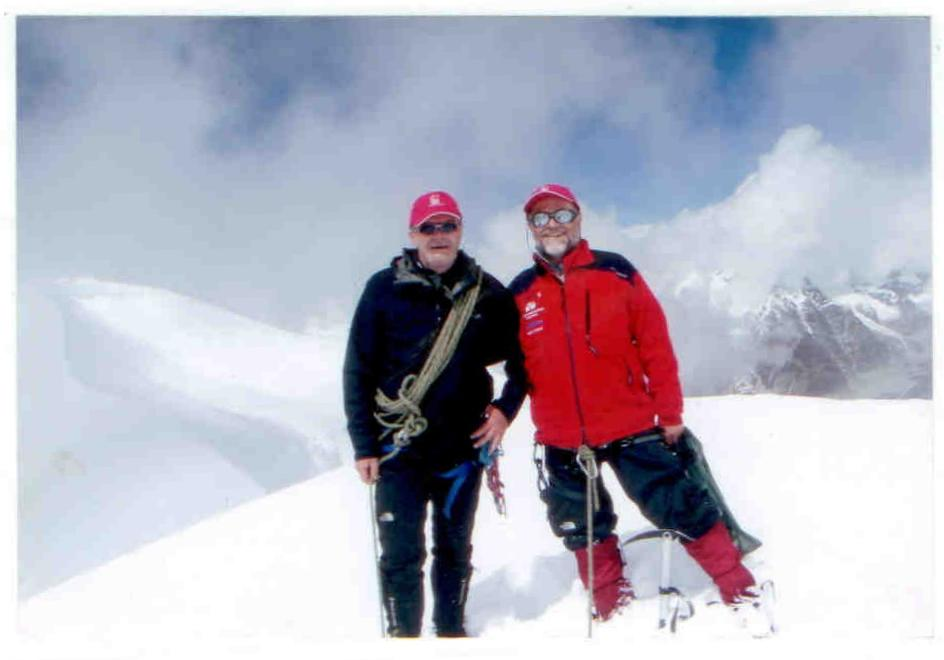
- Berbeka (left) on Mera Peak in 2009

Personal information
- Born: 17 October 1954 Zakopane, Poland
- Died: 6 March 2013 (aged 58) Broad Peak, Pakistan

Maciej Berbeka (17 October 1954 – 6 March 2013) was a Polish mountaineer and mountain guide.

Berbeka made the first-ever winter ascent of three eight-thousanders: Manaslu, on 12 January 1984 with Ryszard Gajewski, Cho Oyu, on 12 February 1985 with Maciej Pawlikowski (the only winter ascent on an eight-thousander made along a new route), and Broad Peak on 5 March 2013 with Adam Bielecki, Artur Małek, and Tomasz Kowalski. Berbeka and Tomasz Kowalski went missing on 6 March 2013 as they were descending from Broad Peak. They were declared dead two days later.

Berbeka had also summited Annapurna in 1982, Mount Everest and Lhotse. He was also the first person in history to have reached over 8000 m during the winter in Karakoram – Rocky Summit (8028 m), on 6 March 1988.

His life is the subject of a 2022 Polish Netflix film, Broad Peak.

== See also ==
- List of deaths on eight-thousanders
- List of people who disappeared mysteriously (2000–present)
