= Mansiri Himal =

Small mountain range in Nepal

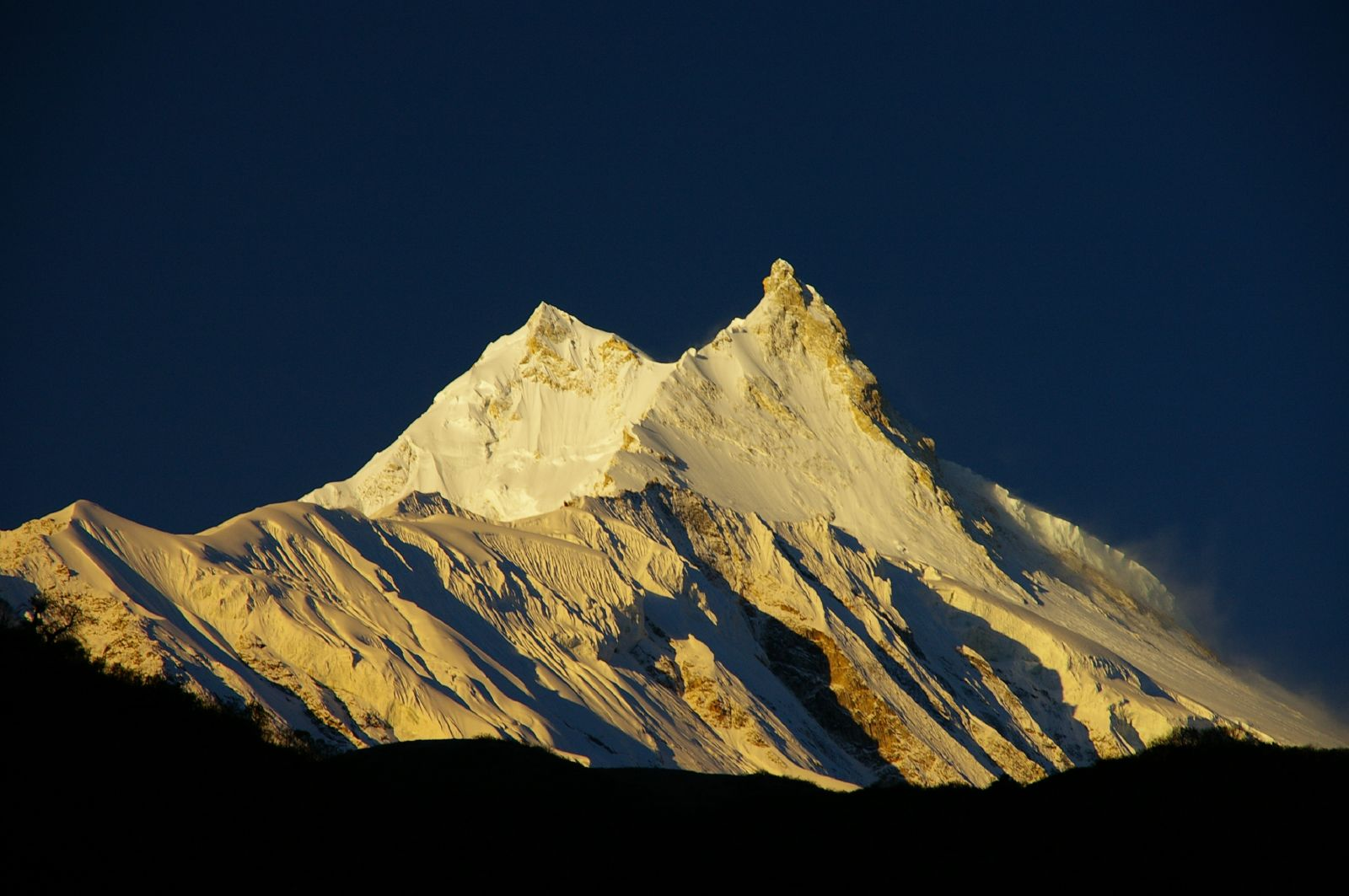
- Sunrise over Manaslu

Highest point
- Peak: Manaslu
- Elevation: 8,156 m (26,759 ft)
- Coordinates: 28°32′58″N 84°33′43″E

Geography
- Location within Nepal
- Country: Nepal
- Districts: Gorkha, Manang and Lamjung
- Parent range: Himalayas
- Borders on: Annapurna Himal, Peri Himal, Ganesh Himal, Serang (Sringi) Himal and Kutang Himal

Mansiri Himal is a small, high subrange of the Himalayas in north-central Nepal, about 100 km (62 mi) northwest of Kathmandu. The Marshyangdi River separates the Mansiri from the Annapurnas to the southwest, then an upper tributary the Dudh Khola separates Peri Himal to the northwest. On the east side, the Burhi (Budhi) Gandaki separates the Mansiri from Ganesh Himal, Serang or Sringi Himal and Kutang Himal. All these streams are tributaries to the Gandaki.

The Mansiri range is also known as Manaslu Himal or the Gurkha Massif. It contains these peaks among Earth's twenty highest (with at least 500m topographic prominence):

- Manaslu, 8,156 m (26,759 ft), 8th highest
- Himalchuli, 7,893 m (25,896 ft), 18th highest
- Ngadi Chuli, 7,871 m (25,823 ft), 20th highest

The Mansiri range is notable for its local relief. It rises 7,000 m (23,000 ft) above the Marsyangdi valley floor in less than 22 km (14 mi) horizontal distance.
