= Piotr Pustelnik =

Polish alpine and high-altitude climber

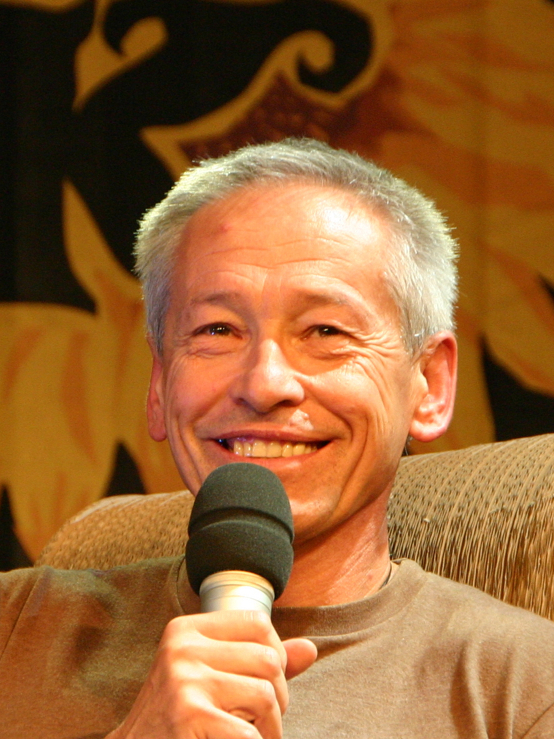
- Piotr Pustelnik in 2011
- Born: 12 July 1951 (age 74); Łódź, Poland
- Known for: Summiting all 14 eight-thousanders

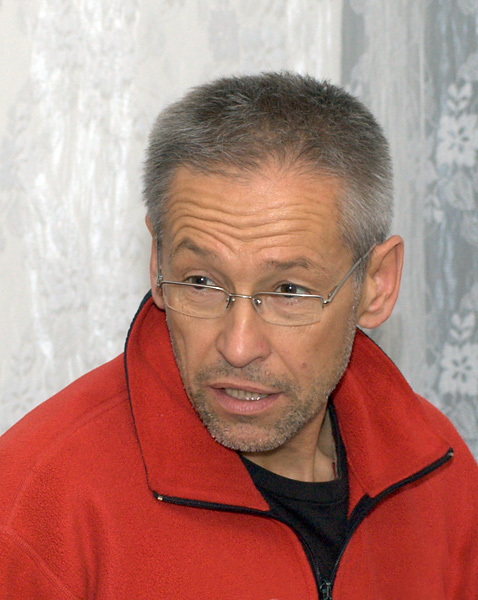
Piotr Pustelnik (2006)

Piotr Pustelnik (born 12 July 1951 in Łódź, Poland) is a Polish alpine and high-altitude climber. He is the 20th man to climb all fourteen eight-thousanders. He is also a doctor of chemistry and researcher at the Łódź University of Technology.

== Eight-thousander ascents ==
Date	Mountain	Notes	Reference
19 July 1990	Gasherbrum II
12 July 1992	Nanga Parbat
24 September 1993	Cho Oyu
6 October 1993	Shishapangma
26 September 1994	Dhaulagiri
12 May 1995	Mount Everest	ascent with oxygen
14 July 1996	K2	ascent with oxygen
15 July 1997	Gasherbrum I
15 May 2000	Lhotse	ascent with oxygen
15 May 2001	Kangchenjunga	ascent with oxygen
16 May 2002	Makalu	ascent with oxygen
17 May 2003	Manaslu	oxygen used during sleep
8 July 2006	Broad Peak
27 April 2010	Annapurna	ascent with oxygen
