= Larkya La =

Pass in the Himalaya of Nepal

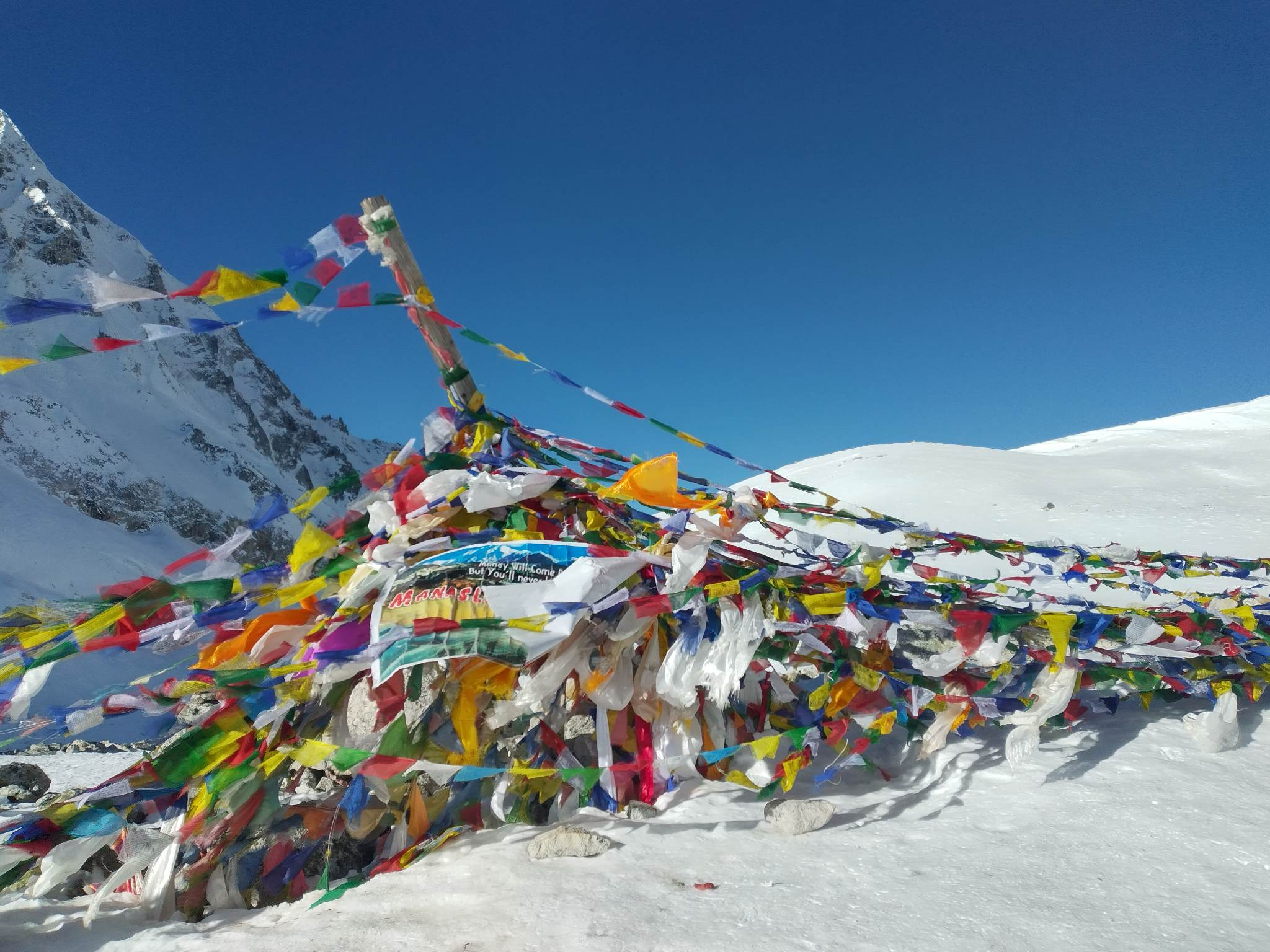
- Larkya La

- Location within Nepal
- Elevation: 5,106 m (16,752 ft)

Location
- Location: Manang, Gandaki Province, Nepal
- Range: Himalayas
- Coordinates: 28.66392°N 84.52035°E

Larkya La is one of the longest passes in the Himalaya of Nepal, situated at 5,106 metres (16,752 ft) above the sea level. It is located in between Dharmashala and Bimthang, and is the highest point in the Manaslu Circuit Trek. The challenging Larkya La Pass at 5,160 meters provides a thrilling ascent and rewards trekkers with panoramic mountain vistas.
