= Maciej Pawlikowski =

Polish mountaineer

Maciej Pawlikowski (born 19 February 1951) is a Polish climber. He is best known for the first winter ascent of Cho Oyu together with Maciej Berbeka on 12 February 1985. He is also the current president of the Zakopane Mountaineering Club.
