= Gyalzen Norbu =

Nepalese sherpa and sirdar (1917–1961)

Gyalzen Norbu (1917-11 May 1961) was also known as Gyaltsen Norbu, and Gyalgen Norbu, he made the first ascent of Manaslu whilst climbing with a party of Japanese mountaineers in 1956. He became the first person to climb two eight-thousanders: Makalu in 1955 and Manaslu in 1956.

== Eight-thousanders ==
Gyalzen Norbu took part in the French Himalayan expedition to Makalu 8,485 m (27,838 ft) in 1955 as Sirdar. The team made the first ascent of the mountain on 15 May 1955 (via the north face and east ridge), Lionel Terray and Jean Couzy were the first to reach the summit. The following day Guido Magnone and Gyalzen Norbu reached the summit. Another four French members of the team summited on 17 May.

He climbed on Manaslu 8,163 m (26,781 ft) with Japanese parties in every year from 1952 to 1956 and he was Sirdar for the Japanese expedition in 1956. The 1956 expedition leader Maki Yūkō, speaking of Gyalzen, expressed the view that "being head of the Sherpas he was treated as one of the climbing party" and he was one of the two people in the first team to attempt the summit. On 9 May he and Toshio Imanishi made the first ascent of the mountain.

In 1956 he was awarded a Tiger Badge by the Himalayan Club for his part in the 1955 French expedition to Makalu, his 'Himalayan Club Number' was 145.

== Death ==
In 1961, Gyalzen Norbu took part in a Japanese expedition to Langtang Lirung 7,234 m (23,734 ft) in the Langtang valley of Nepal. The expedition attempted an ascent by the Lirung Glacier and the east ridge. On the 11th of May he and the Japanese climbers K. Morimoto (expedition leader) and K. Oshima were buried by an avalanche in Camp III.
