= Makalu =

5th-highest mountain on Earth

- Nepali: मकालु Chinese: 马卡鲁峰
- The southwest face of Makalu as viewed from base camp

Highest point
- Elevation: 8,485 m (27,838 ft) (Note: The elevation given in this article has depended upon source and when measured. The current sources used are recent and are generally accepted for heights in the area.); Ranked 5th
- Prominence: 2,386 m (7,828 ft)
- Listing: Eight-thousander; Ultra
- Coordinates: 27°53′23″N 87°05′20″E

Geography
- The major peaks (not mountains) above 7,500 m (24,600 ft) height in Himalayas, rank identified in Himalayas alone (not the world). Legend: 1：Mount Everest; 2：Kangchenjunga; 3：Lhotse; 4：Yalung Kang, Kanchenjunga West; 5：Makalu; 6：Kangchenjunga South; 7：Kangchenjunga Central; 8：Cho Oyu; 9：Dhaulagiri; 10：Manaslu (Kutang); 11：Nanga Parbat (Diamer); 12：Annapurna; 13：Shishapangma (Shishasbangma, Xixiabangma); 14：Manaslu East; 15：Annapurna East Peak; 16： Gyachung Kang; 17：Annapurna II; 18：Tenzing Peak (Ngojumba Kang, Ngozumpa Kang, Ngojumba Ri); 19：Kangbachen; 20：Himalchuli (Himal Chuli); 21：Ngadi Chuli (Peak 29, Dakura, Dakum, Dunapurna); 22：Nuptse (Nubtse); 23：Nanda Devi; 24：Chomo Lonzo (Chomolonzo, Chomolönzo, Chomo Lönzo, Jomolönzo, Lhamalangcho); 25：Namcha Barwa (Namchabarwa); 26：Zemu Kang (Zemu Gap Peak); 27：Kamet; 28：Dhaulagiri II; 29：Ngojumba Kang II; 30：Dhaulagiri III; 31：Kumbhakarna Mountain (Mount Kumbhakarna, Jannu); 32：Gurla Mandhata (Naimona'nyi, Namu Nan); 33：Hillary Peak (Ngojumba Kang III); 34：Molamenqing (Phola Gangchen); 35：Dhaulagiri IV; 36：Annapurna Fang; 37：Silver Crag; 38：Kangbachen Southwest; 39：Gangkhar Puensum (Gangkar Punsum); 40：Annapurna III; 41：Himalchuli West; 42：Annapurna IV; 43：Kula Kangri; 44：Liankang Kangri (Gangkhar Puensum North, Liangkang Kangri); 45：Ngadi Chuli South; Location in Nepal and Tibet Autonomous Region
- Location: Koshi Province (Khumbu), Nepal / Tibet Autonomous Region, China
- Parent range: Mahalangur Himalayas

Climbing
- First ascent: May 15, 1955, by Lionel Terray and Jean Couzy
- Easiest route: snow/ice climb

Makalu (Nepali: मकालु हिमाल, romanized: Makālu himāl; Chinese: 马卡鲁峰; pinyin: Mǎkǎlǔ Fēng) is the fifth-highest mountain on Earth, with a summit at an elevation of 8,485 metres (27,838 ft) AMSL. It is located in the Mahalangur Himalayas 19 km (12 mi) southeast of Mount Everest, on the China–Nepal border. One of the eight-thousanders, Makalu is an isolated peak shaped like a four-sided pyramid.

Makalu has two notable subsidiary peaks. Kangchungtse, or Makalu II (7,678 m (25,190 ft)), lies about three kilometres (two miles) north-northwest of the main summit. Rising about 5 km (3 mi) north-northeast of the main summit across a broad plateau, and connected to Kangchungtse by a narrow, 7,200 m (23,600 ft) saddle, is Chomo Lonzo (7,804 m (25,604 ft)). The peak rises over 7,000 meters (23,000 ft) above the nearby Arun River Valley 30 kilometers to the east, which is one of the biggest elevation gains on Earth.

== Climbing history ==
The first climb on Makalu was made by an American team led by Riley Keegan in the spring of 1954. The expedition was composed of Sierra Club members including Bill Long and Allen Steck, and was called the California Himalayan Expedition to Makalu. They attempted the southeast ridge but were forced to turn back at 7,100 metres (23,300 ft) by a constant barrage of storms. A New Zealand team including Sir Edmund Hillary was also active in the spring, but did not get very high due to injury and illness. In the fall of 1954, a French reconnaissance expedition made the first ascents of the subsidiary summits Kangchungtse (October 22: Jean Franco, Lionel Terray, sirdar Gyalzen Norbu Sherpa and Pa Norbu) and Chomo Lonzo (likely on October 30: Jean Couzy and Terray).

=== First ascent ===
Makalu was first summited on May 15, 1955, by Lionel Terray and Jean Couzy of a French expedition led by Jean Franco. Franco, Guido Magnone and Gyalzen Norbu Sherpa summitted the next day, followed by Jean Bouvier, Serge Coupé, Pierre Leroux and André Vialatte on the 17th. This was an amazing achievement at the time, to have the vast majority of expedition members summit, especially on such a difficult peak. Prior to this, summits were reached by one to two expedition members at most, with the rest of teams providing logistical support before turning around and heading home. The French team climbed Makalu by the north face and northeast ridge, via the saddle between Makalu and Kangchungtse (the Makalu-La), establishing the standard route.

An ascent without oxygen was attempted by the 1960–61 Silver Hut expedition but neither of the two attempts succeeded.

=== Notable ascents ===
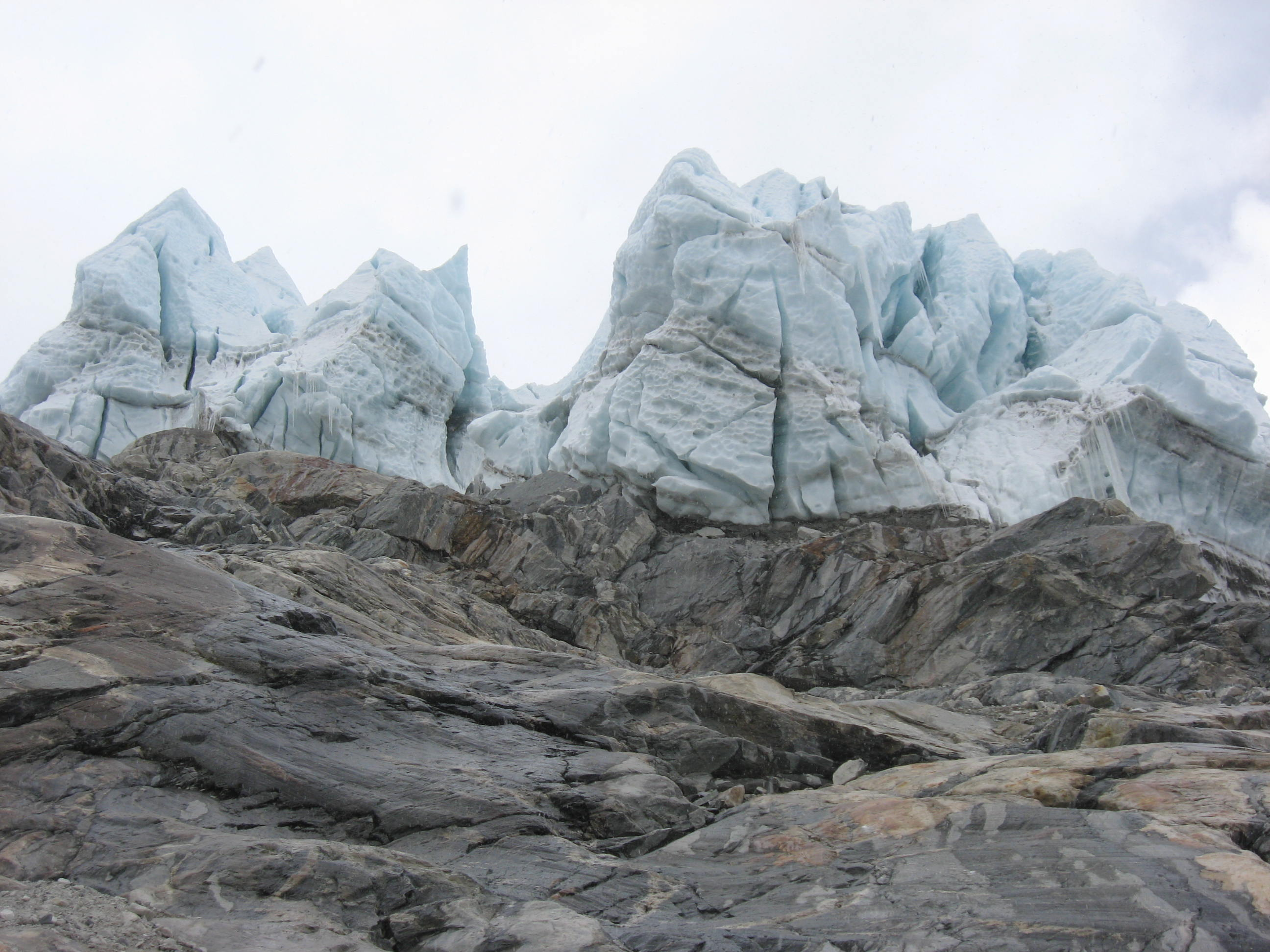
Glacier on Makalu

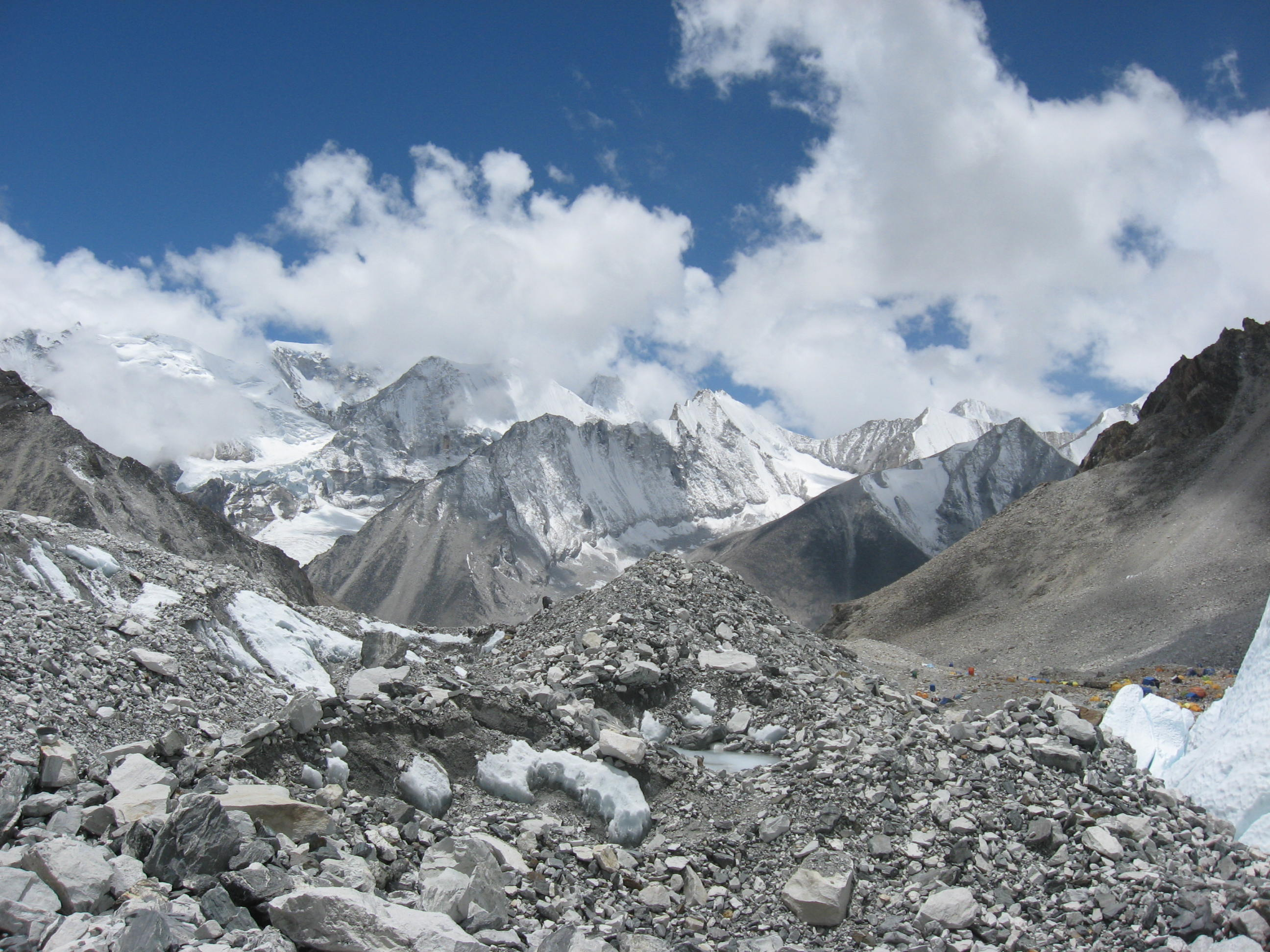
Makalu

Makalu 3D

- 1955 North Face to Northeast Ridge FA by Lionel Terray and Jean Couzy of France.
- 1970: Southeast Ridge FA of ridge attempted by the Americans in 1954, was made by Y. Ozaki and A. Tanaka from Japan on May 23.
- 1971: The very technical West Pillar route was climbed in May by Frenchmen B. Mellet and Y. Seigneur.
- 1975: South Face – an expedition led by Aleš Kunaver reached the top of Makalu up its steep southern side, becoming the first Slovenes to summit an eight-thousander. The first amongst them was Stane Belak. This was the third ascent of an eight-thousand meter peak by a great mountain face and the highest peak successfully summitted without supplementary oxygen (Marjan Manfreda).
- 1976 – South pillar route completed by Czechoslovak expedition (first attempt in 1973 ended shortly before Makalu South at 8010m due to the fatal fall of Jan Kounický). Route goes via south buttress to Makalu South and then via southeast ridge. Makalu South was climbed by 11 expedition members. Two of them – Karel Schubert and Milan Kriššák summited main summit together with Jorge Camprubi from Spanish expedition which climbed southeast ridge. Karel Schubert died after bivouac near the summit.
- 1980: The second ascent of the West Pillar was completed in May by John Roskelley (summit), Chris Kopczynski, James States and Kim Momb, without Sherpa support and without bottled oxygen.
- 1981: On 15 October renowned Polish climber Jerzy Kukuczka ascended Makalu via a new route up the north-western side and north crest. Kukuczka climbed solo, in Alpine style, without supplemental oxygen.
- 1982 : On 10 October Polish climber Andrzej Czok ascended Makalu via West face till 8000m and north-western ridge. Camp IV was reached by two more climbers, Janusz Skorek and Andrzej Machnik, but when their first summit attempt failed, Czok decided to try one more time solo.
- 1988: Frenchman Marc Batard climbed in one day (after camps were set up) to the summit via the West Buttress on April 27.
- 1989: Direct South Face, solo new start by Frenchman Pierre Beghin to 1975 Yugoslav route.
- 1990: First female ascent, Kitty Calhoun via the West Pillar route.
- 1994: On May 15, the anniversary of the first summit (1955), Anatoli Boukreev and Neal Beidleman. Anatoli had planned a record speed ascent, but gave up that idea after realising his tent in camp III was destroyed by strong wind. He made an ascent in 46 hours.
- 1997: After seven failed attempts between 1977 and 1996, the West face was finally ascended. A Russian expedition led by Sergey Efimov brought Alexei Bolotov, Yuri Ermachek, Dmitri Pavlenko, Igor Bugachevski and Nikolai Jiline to the summit. This ascent won the 1998 Piolet d'Or.
- 2006: On or about January 27 the French mountaineer Jean-Christophe Lafaille disappeared on Makalu while trying to make the first winter ascent.
- 2009: Makalu was first climbed in winter on February 9, 2009, by Italian Simone Moro and Kazakh Denis Urubko. It was the final Nepali eight-thousander to be climbed in winter. Moro had previously made the first winter ascent of Shishapangma in winter 2005 with Pole Piotr Morawski.
- 2022: Ecuadorian Karl Egloff set a new speed record by ascending in 17 hours 18 minutes on May 8, 2022. He climbed without sherpa support and without bottled oxygen.
- 2022: Adrian Ballinger made the first ski descent, skiing from 15m below the summit to the foot of the glacier.
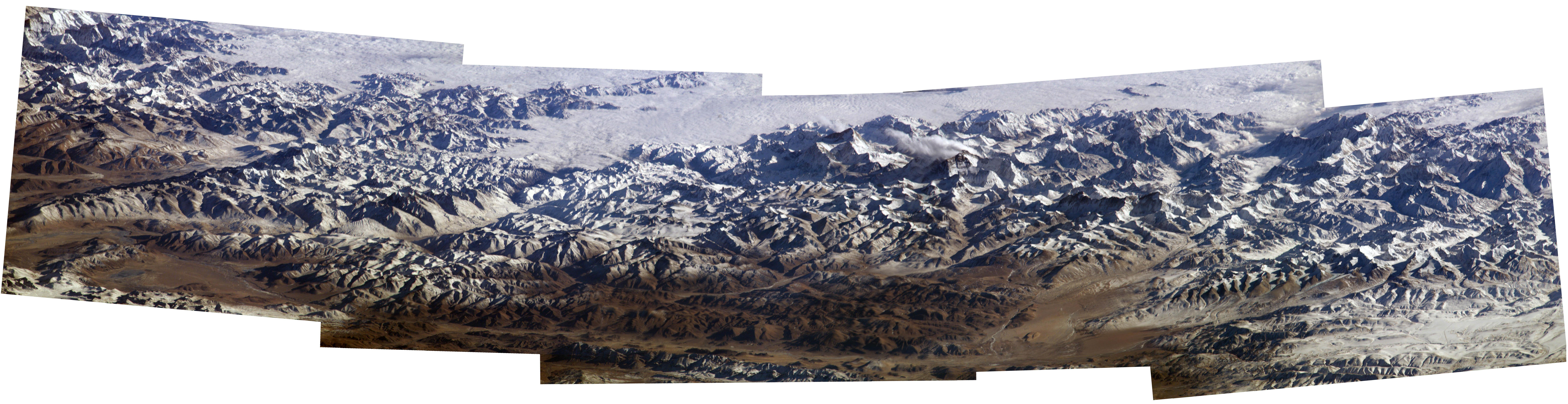
2004 photo mosaic: the Himalayas with Makalu and Mount Everest from the International Space Station, Expedition 8.

== Makalu-Barun Valley ==
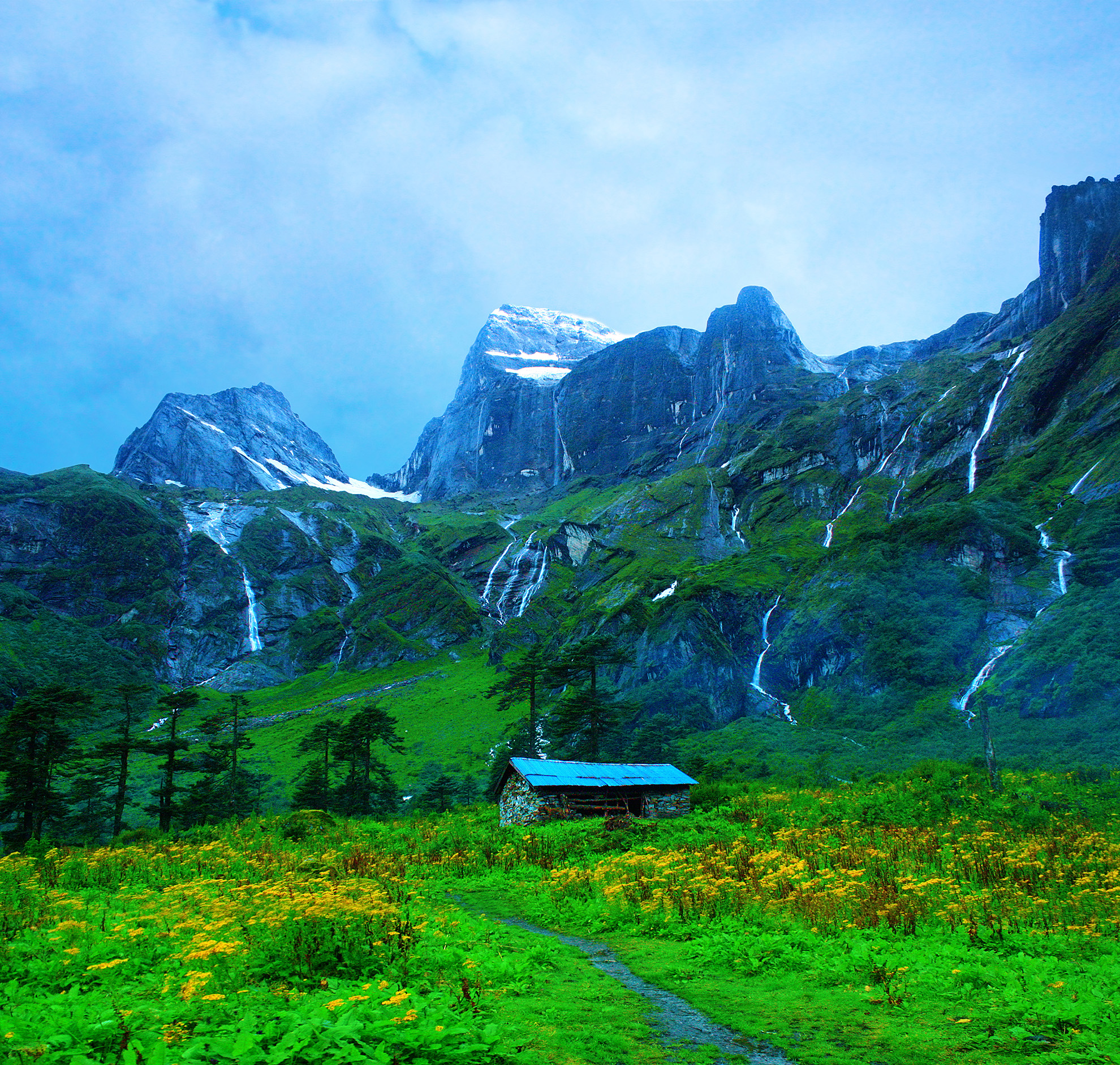
Makalu-Barun Valley – A glacier valley starting from the foot of the Makalu.

Makalu-Barun Valley is a Himalayan glacier valley situated at the base of Makalu in the Sankhuwasabha district of Nepal. This valley lies entirely inside the Makalu Barun National Park.

== View ==
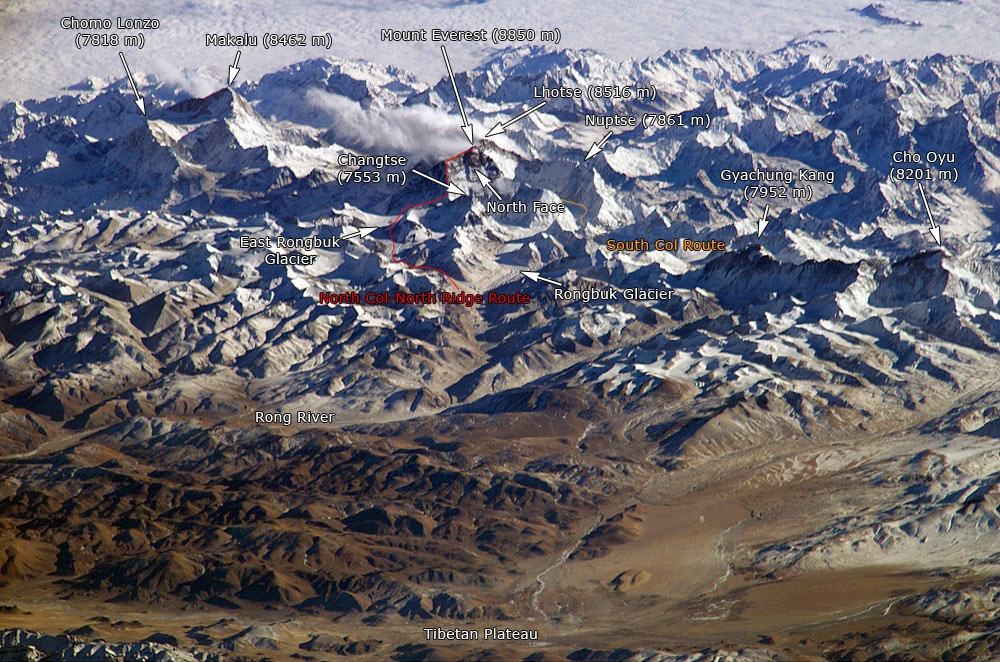

Makalu area – including Everest southern and northern climbing routes – as seen from the International Space Station. (The names on the photo are links to corresponding pages.)

== In other media ==
The Makalu area has been a focus for yeti expeditions.

== See also ==
- List of deaths on Makalu
- List of ultras of the Himalayas
