= Manaslu =

8th-highest mountain on Earth

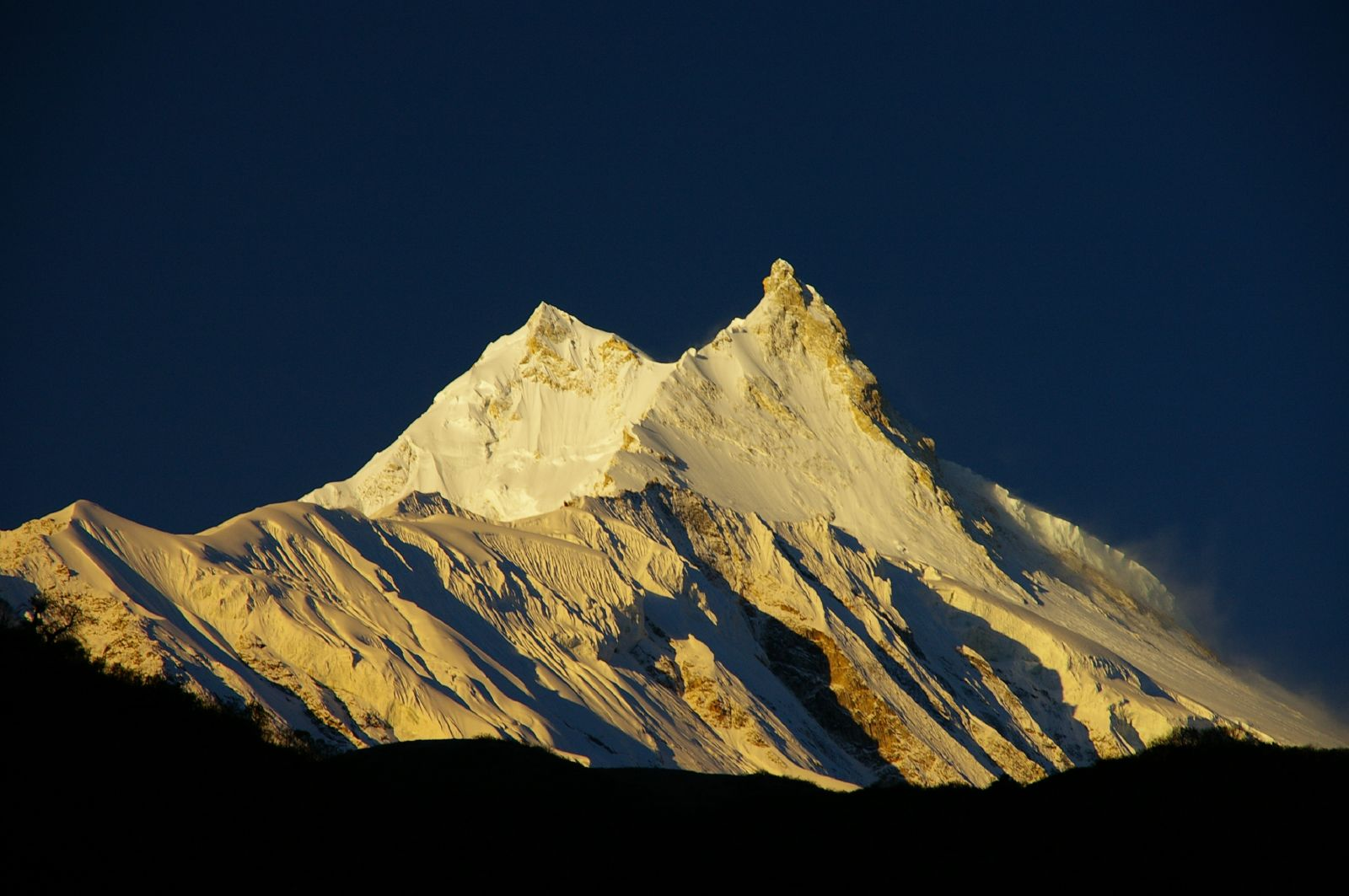
- Manaslu at sunrise. The lower eastern summit appears taller due to foreshortening.

Highest point
- Elevation: 8,163 m (26,781 ft); Ranked 8th
- Prominence: 3,092 m (10,144 ft); Ranked 80th
- Listing: Eight-thousander; Ultra
- Coordinates: 28°32′58″N 84°33′43″E

Naming
- Native name: मनास्लु (Nepali)
- English translation: Mountain of the spirit

Geography
- The major peaks (not mountains) above 7,500 m (24,600 ft) height in Himalayas, rank identified in Himalayas alone (not the world). Legend: 1：Mount Everest; 2：Kangchenjunga; 3：Lhotse; 4：Yalung Kang, Kanchenjunga West; 5：Makalu; 6：Kangchenjunga South; 7：Kangchenjunga Central; 8：Cho Oyu; 9：Dhaulagiri; 10：Manaslu (Kutang); 11：Nanga Parbat (Diamer); 12：Annapurna; 13：Shishapangma (Shishasbangma, Xixiabangma); 14：Manaslu East; 15：Annapurna East Peak; 16： Gyachung Kang; 17：Annapurna II; 18：Tenzing Peak (Ngojumba Kang, Ngozumpa Kang, Ngojumba Ri); 19：Kangbachen; 20：Himalchuli (Himal Chuli); 21：Ngadi Chuli (Peak 29, Dakura, Dakum, Dunapurna); 22：Nuptse (Nubtse); 23：Nanda Devi; 24：Chomo Lonzo (Chomolonzo, Chomolönzo, Chomo Lönzo, Jomolönzo, Lhamalangcho); 25：Namcha Barwa (Namchabarwa); 26：Zemu Kang (Zemu Gap Peak); 27：Kamet; 28：Dhaulagiri II; 29：Ngojumba Kang II; 30：Dhaulagiri III; 31：Kumbhakarna Mountain (Mount Kumbhakarna, Jannu); 32：Gurla Mandhata (Naimona'nyi, Namu Nan); 33：Hillary Peak (Ngojumba Kang III); 34：Molamenqing (Phola Gangchen); 35：Dhaulagiri IV; 36：Annapurna Fang; 37：Silver Crag; 38：Kangbachen Southwest; 39：Gangkhar Puensum (Gangkar Punsum); 40：Annapurna III; 41：Himalchuli West; 42：Annapurna IV; 43：Kula Kangri; 44：Liankang Kangri (Gangkhar Puensum North, Liangkang Kangri); 45：Ngadi Chuli South; Location of Manaslu
- Location: Gorkha District, Manang-Gandaki Province, Nepal
- Parent range: Mansiri Himal, Himalayas

Climbing
- First ascent: May 9, 1956, by a Japanese team (First winter ascent 12 January 1984 Maciej Berbeka and Ryszard Gajewski)
- Easiest route: snow/ice climb on NE face

Manaslu (/məˈnɑːsluː/; Nepali: मनास्लु, also known as Kutang) is the eighth-highest mountain in the world at 8,163 metres (26,781 ft) above sea level. It is in the Mansiri Himal, part of the Nepalese Himalayas, in west-central Nepal. Manaslu means "mountain of the spirit" and the word is derived from the Sanskrit word manasa, meaning "intellect" or "soul". Manaslu was first climbed on May 9, 1956, by Toshio Imanishi and Gyalzen Norbu, members of a Japanese expedition.

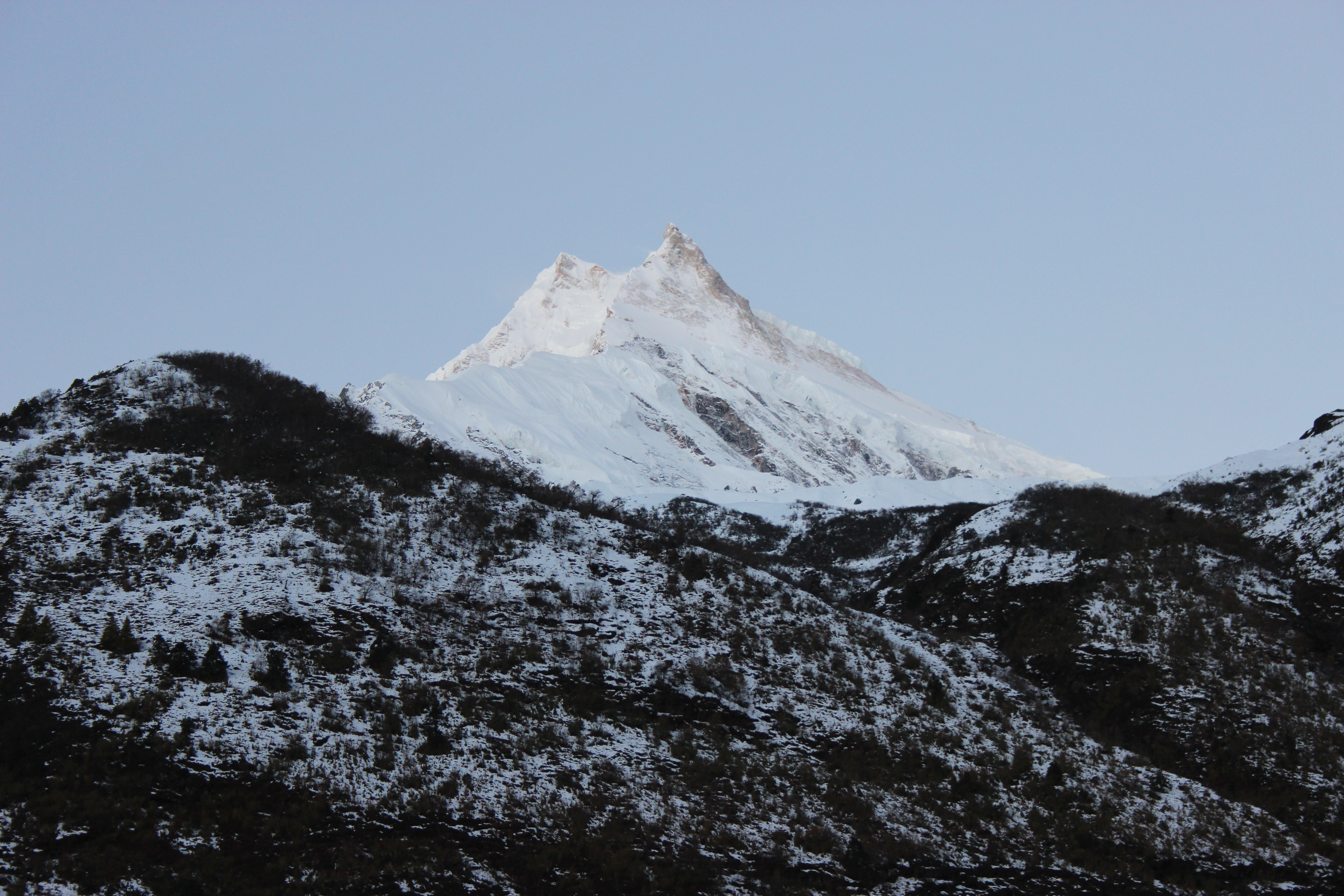
Manaslu Peak

Manaslu is the highest peak in the Gorkha District and is about 64 km (40 mi) east of Annapurna, the tenth highest mountain in the world at 8,091 metres (26,545 ft) above sea level. Manaslu's long ridges and valley glaciers offer feasible approaches from all directions and culminate in a peak that towers steeply above its surrounding landscape and is a dominant feature when viewed from afar.

The Manaslu region offers a variety of trekking options. The popular Manaslu trekking route of 177 kilometres (110 mi) skirts the Manaslu massif over the pass down to Annapurna. The Nepalese Government only permitted trekking on this circuit in 1991. The trekking trail follows an ancient salt-trading route along the Budhi Gandaki River. En route, 10 peaks over 6,500 metres (21,325 ft) are visible, including a few over 7,000 metres (22,966 ft). The highest point reached along the trek route is Larkya La at an elevation of 5,106 metres (16,752 ft). As of May 2008, the mountain has been climbed 297 times with 53 fatalities.

The Manaslu Conservation Area Project (MCAP) was established in 1997 with the primary objective of achieving conservation and sustainable management of the delimited area, which also includes Manaslu.

== General ==
Set in the northern Himalayan range in the Gorkha District of Nepal, Manaslu is a serrated "wall of snow and ice hanging in the sky". The three sides of the mountain fall in steps to terraces down below, which are sparsely inhabited with agricultural operations practiced on the land. Apart from climbing Manaslu, trekking is popular in this mountain region, as part of the Manaslu Circuit, a notable path for trekkers in Nepal.

The Manaslu Conservation Area, declared as such in December 1998 under the National Parks and Wildlife Conservation Act, subsumes Manaslu within it. The area covered under the conservation zone is 1,663 square kilometres (642 mi^{2}) and is managed by the National Trust for Nature Conservation (NTNC) of Nepal. The status of "conservation area" applied to the Manaslu area or region was with the basic objective of "To conserve and sustainably manage the natural resources and rich cultural heritage and to promote ecotourism to improve livelihood of the local people in the MCA region."

Manaslu Himal, as it is popularly known among trekkers, offers views of the snow-capped Himalayan mountains and provides an opportunity for interaction with the diverse ethnic groups that inhabit the hill villages scattered along the trek route.

The trekking route is through mountainous terrain prone to the consequences of monsoon rainfall, landslides, and landfalls. Hypothermia and altitude sickness, as well as encounters with passing yaks, are common. Trekking to Manaslu is thus a test of endurance.

== Geography ==
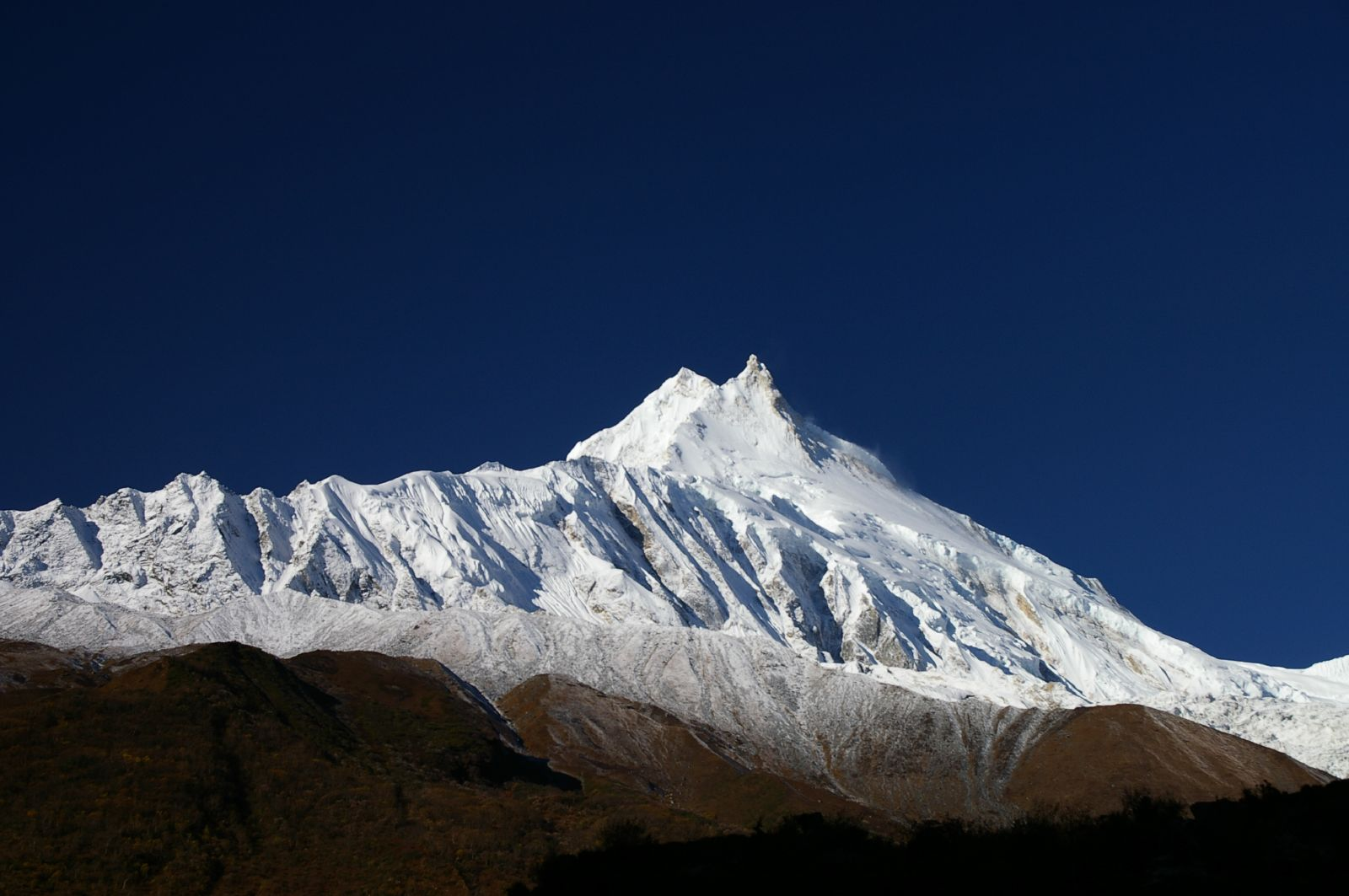
Manaslu from base camp

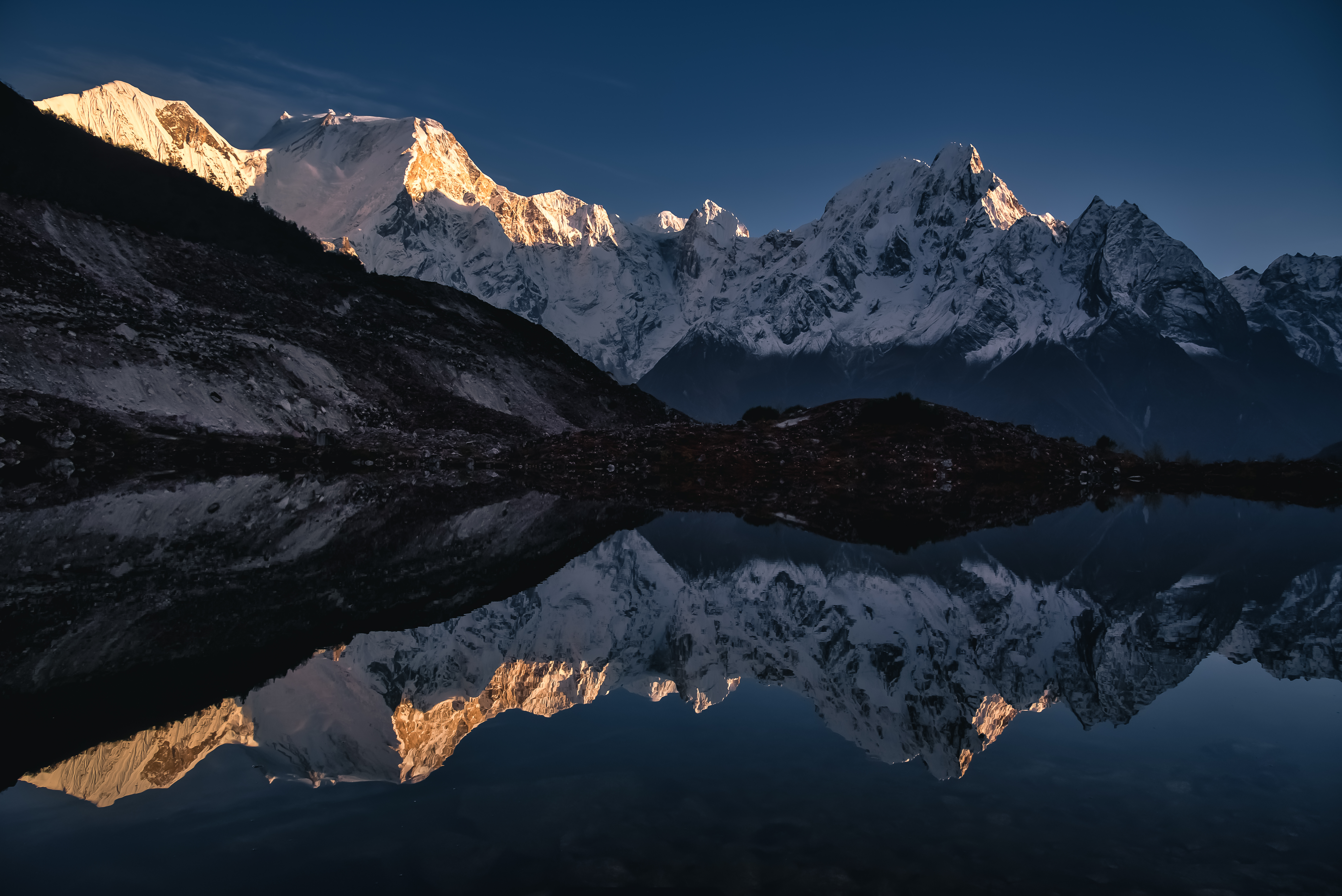
Manaslu range

The region, which is also termed the Manaslu Conservation Area, comprises sub-tropical Himalayan foothills to arid Trans-Himalayan high pastures bordering Tibet. Starting from Arughat and extending into the Larkhe La pass, the area covers six climatic zones: the tropical and sub-tropical zone, elevation varies from 1,000–2,000 metres (3,300–6,600 ft); the temperate zone (within elevation range of 2,000–3,000 metres (6,600–9,800 ft); the sub-alpine zone elevation range of 3,000–4,000 metres (9,800–13,100 ft); the alpine zone, a range of 4,000–5,000 metres (13,000–16,000 ft)) meadows; and the arctic zone (lying above 4,500 metres (14,800 ft)). The zones coalesce with the variation of the altitude from about 600 metres (2,000 ft) in the tropical zone to the 8,156 metres (26,759 ft) summit of Manaslu in the arctic zone.

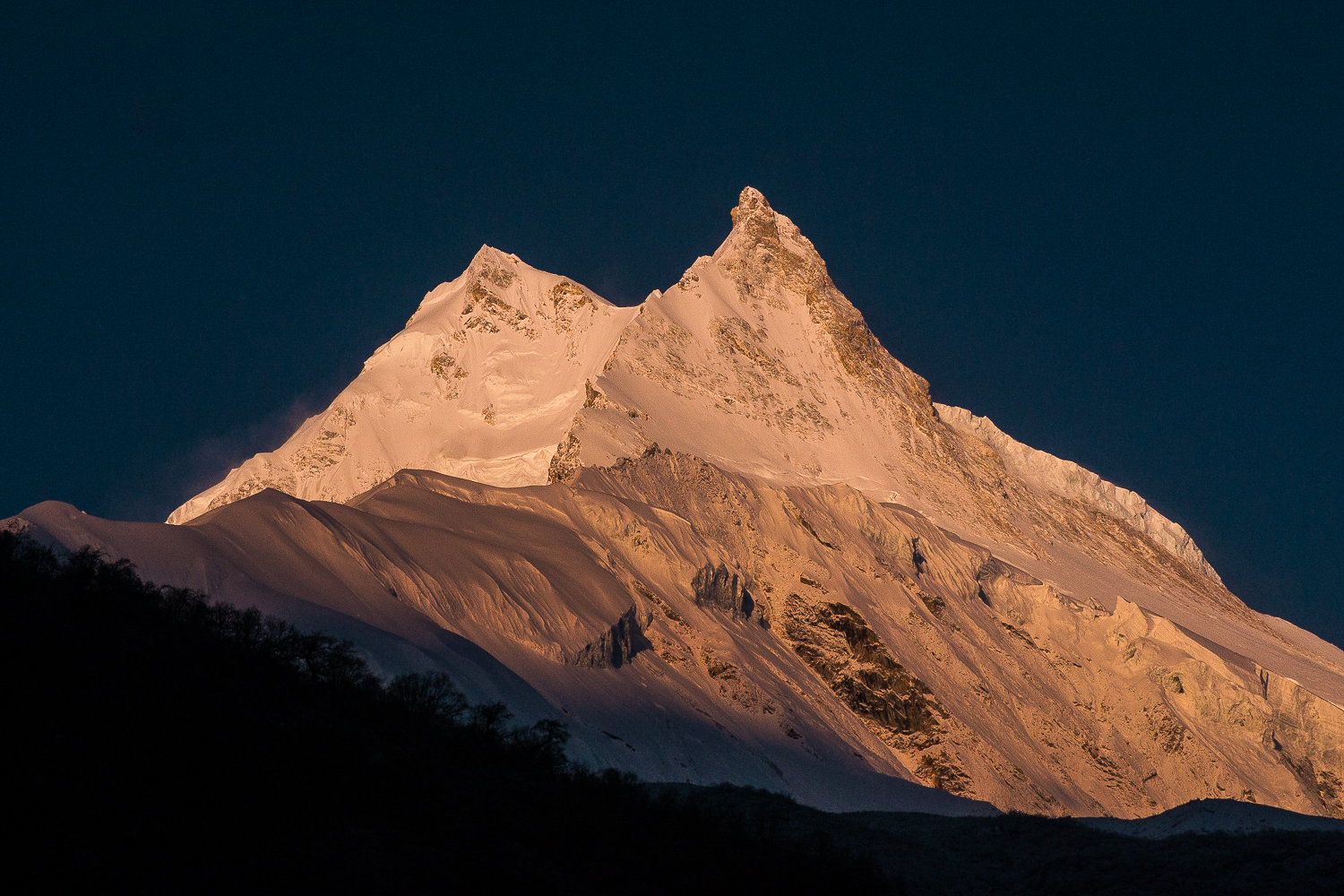
The morning view of Manaslu from Samagoan Village

Manaslu is known in the Tibetan language as "Kutan l", in which "tang" means the Tibetan word for a flat place. It is a very large peak with an elevation of 8,163 metres (26,781 ft) (the world's eighth-highest mountain). In view of its favourable topography of long ridges and glacial valleys, Manaslu offers several routes to mountaineers. Important peaks surrounding Manaslu include Ngadi Chuli, Himalchuli and Baudha. A glacial saddle known as Larkya La, with an elevation of 5,106 metres (16,752 ft), lies north of Manaslu. The peak is bounded on the east by the Ganesh Himal and the Buri Gandaki River gorge, on the west by the deep fissures of the Marysyangdi Khola with its Annapurna range of hills, and to the south is the Gorkha town at the foot of the hill (from where trekking operates during the season), which is an aerial distance of 48 kilometres (30 mi) to the peak. There are six established trek routes to the peak, and the south face is reportedly the most difficult for climbing.

=== Climate ===
The permanent snow line is reckoned above 5,000 metres (16,000 ft) elevation. Precipitation in the area is both from snowfall and rainfall; the average annual rainfall is about 1,900 millimetres (75 in), mostly during the monsoon period, which extends from June to September. The temperatures in the area also vary widely with the climatic zone: in the subtropical zone, the average summer and winter temperatures vary in the range of 31–34 °C (88–93 °F) and 8–13 °C (46–55 °F) respectively; in the temperate climatic zone, the summer temperatures are 22–25 °C (72–77 °F) and winter temperatures are −2–6 °C (28–43 °F) when snow and frost are also experienced; in the subalpine zone, during December to May snowfall generally occurs and the mean annual temperature is 6–10 °C (43–50 °F). The Arctic zone is distinct and falls within the permanent snow line; there, the temperatures lie much below freezing.

==== Major peaks ====
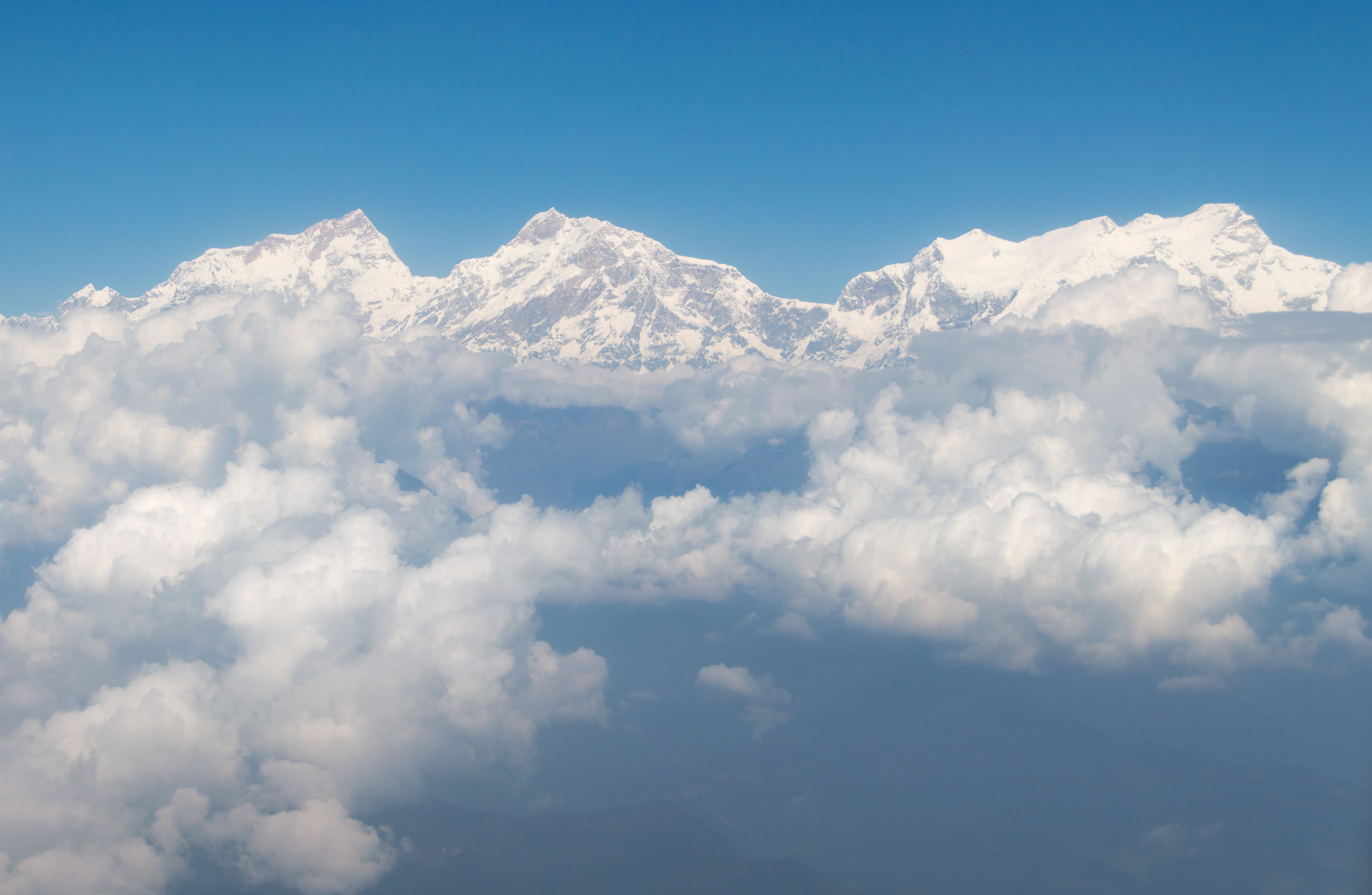
Major peaks of Mansiri Himal range (left to right): Manaslu, Ngadi Chuli, Himalchuli

There are other major peaks in the region, namely Himalchuli (7,893 m or 25,896 ft), Ngadi Chuli (7,871 m or 25,823 ft), Shringi (7,187 m or 23,579 ft), Langpo (6,668 m or 21,877 ft) and Saula (6,235 m or 20,456 ft).

== Ecosystem ==
=== Fauna ===
Unlike many other regions, this valley is a sanctuary to many highly endangered animals, including snow leopards and red pandas. Other mammals include lynx, Asian black bear, grey wolf, dhole, Assam macaque, Himalayan musk deer, blue sheep, Himalayan tahr, mainland serow, Himalayan goral, woolly hare, horseshoe bat, Himalayan mouse-hare, and black-lipped pika. Over 110 species of birds, 33 mammals, 11 butterflies, and 3 reptiles have been recorded. Conservation of wildlife in the area has been achieved by monks of the monasteries in the area by putting a hunting ban in place. This action has helped wildlife to prosper. The area is now an important habitat for the snow leopard, grey wolf, musk deer, blue sheep, and the Himalayan tahr.

Some 110 species of birds have been identified in the area, including golden eagle, Eurasian griffon, Himalayan griffon, blood, impeyan, kalij and koklass pheasants, Himalayan and Tibetan snow cocks, and the crimson horned pheasant.

=== Vegetation ===
Three main categories of vegetation have been identified in the area. These are categorized on the basis of altitude as low hill, middle mountain, and high mountain types with exclusive types of dominant forests and other associated species. The types of vegetation, however, tend to overlap the adjoining ones at places. Depending on the microclimate and other aspects, an overlap of vegetation is noticed in adjacent areas. However, the forest types are fairly well-defined. The flora in different forest types also does not show much variation. The valley basin has a rich ecotone diversity and includes nineteen different types of forests, most prominently rhododendron, and also Himalayan blue pine, which is flanked by Ganesh Himal and the Sringi ranges. Medicinal herbs and aromatic plants have also been recorded in different forest types and adjoining vegetation. Overall, the presence of 19 types of forests and other forms of dominant vegetation have been recorded from the area. An estimated 1,500–2,000 plant species grow here.

== Ethnic groups ==
There are two ethnicities mainly inhabiting this region; Nubri and Tsum. The branching off of the river at Chhikur divides these two ethnic domains. While Nubri has been frequently visited since Nepal opened itself for tourism in 1950, Tsum still retains much of its traditional culture, art, and tradition. In the central hills of the region, Gurungs are the main ethnic group who have joined the Brigade of Gurkhas in large numbers. Closer to Tibet, the Bhutias (also spelled Bhotias), akin to the Sherpa group, of Tibetan ethnicity dominate the scene as can be discerned from their flat-roofed houses, and they are distinctly Buddhists. The region is dotted with austere monasteries, mani walls, chortens and other Buddhist religious landmarks.

== Climbing history ==
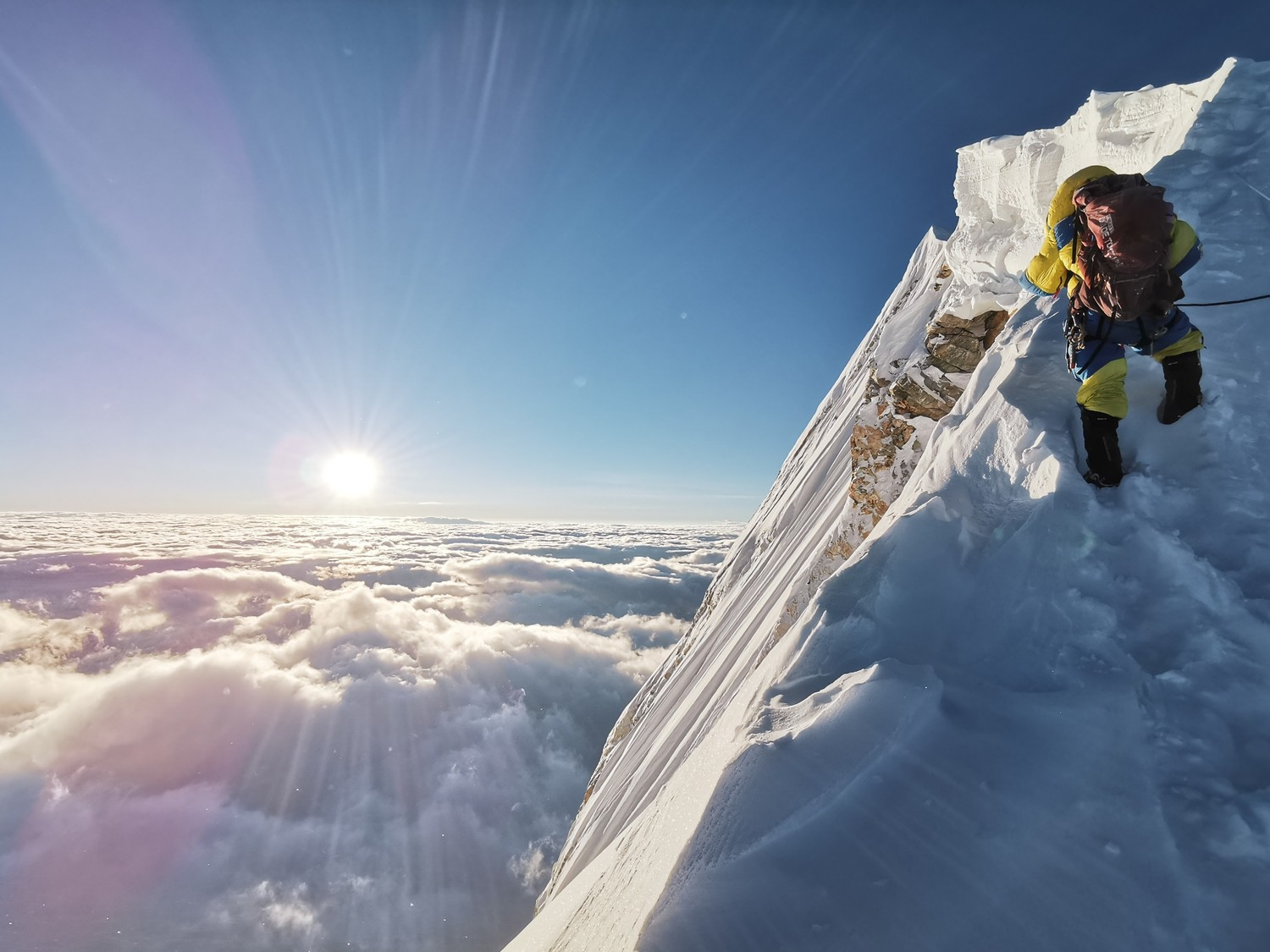
Climber approaching the summit of Manaslu

In 1950, H. W. Tilman was the first European to lead an expedition to the Annapurna Range with a small party of five compatriots. They walked on foot from the Kathmandu Valley (six days of trekking from the valley), and using Manang as their base camp they started exploring the mountain ranges, peaks, and valleys of the Annapurna massif. During this exploration, while making a reconnaissance of the higher reaches of the Dudh Khola, they clearly saw Manaslu from Bumtang. Three months later, after their aborted trip to Annapurna IV, Tilman, accompanied by Major J. O. M. Roberts, trekked to Larkya La pass and from there saw Manaslu and its plateau and concluded that there was a direct route to the summit, although they did not make an attempt on it.

After the reconnaissance visit by Tilman, there were four Japanese expeditions between 1950 and 1955 that explored the possibility of climbing Manaslu by the north and east faces.

In 1952, a Japanese reconnaissance party visited the area after the monsoon season. In the following year (1953), a team of 15 climbers led by Yukio Mita, after setting up base camp at Samagaon, attempted to climb via the east side but failed to reach the summit. In this first attempt by a Japanese team to summit via the northeast face, three climbers reached a height of 7,750 metres (25,430 ft), before turning back.

In 1954, a Japanese team approaching the Buri Gandaki route to the peak faced a hostile group of villagers at Samagaon camp. The villagers thought that the previous expeditions had displeased the gods, causing the avalanches that destroyed the Pung-gyen Monastery and the death of 18 people. As a result of this hostility, the team made a hasty retreat to Ganesh Himal. To appease local sentiments, a large donation was made to rebuild the monastery. However, this philanthropic act did not ease the atmosphere of distrust and hostility towards Japanese expeditions. Even the expedition in 1956 which successfully climbed the mountain faced this situation and as a result the next Japanese expedition only took place in 1971.

In 1956, Toshio Imanishi (Japan) and Gyalzen Norbu (Sherpa) made the first ascent of Manaslu on May 9, 1956. The Japanese expedition was led by Maki Yūkō, also known as Aritsune Maki.

In 1956, David Snellgrove, a noted scholar in Tibetan culture and religion, undertook a seven-month sojourn of mid-west and central Nepal. The route that he followed, accompanied by three Nepalese people, was via Bumtang and Buri Gandaki river and crossing over to the Larkya La.

=== 1970s ===
The next successful climb to the summit of Manaslu was in 1971. On May 17, 1971, Kazuharu Kohara and Motoki, part of an 11-man Japanese team, reached the summit via the north-west spur. Also in 1971, Kim Ho-sup led a Korean expedition attempt via the north-east face. Kim Ki-sup fell to his death on May 4. In 1972, the south-west face was climbed for the first time by Reinhold Messner as part of an Austrian expedition. In 1972, the Koreans attempted the north-east face. On April 10, an avalanche buried their camp at 6,500 metres (21,300 ft), killing fifteen climbers including ten Sherpas and the Korean expedition leader Kim Ho-sup, and Kazunari Yasuhisa from Japan. On April 22, 1973, Gerhard Schmatz, Sigi Hupfauer and a Sherpa climber reached the summit via the north-east face. In the same year, a Spanish expedition led by Jaume Garcia Orts could reach only to 6,100 metres (20,000 ft). The first Japanese women expedition led by Kyoko Sato was successful on May 4, 1974, when all members reached the summit after a failed attempt from the east ridge. They thus became the first women to climb a peak higher than 8,000 metres (26,247 ft). However, one climber died on May 5 when she fell between camps 4 and 5.

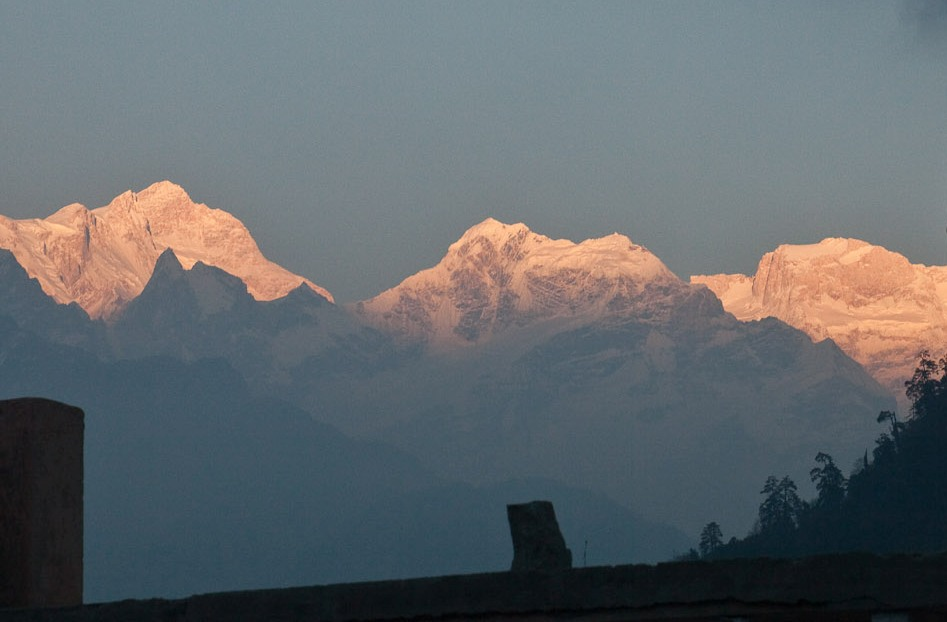
Manaslu (L), Thulagi (M), Ngadi Chuli (Peak 29, R)

=== 1980s ===
In the pre-monsoon period of 1980, a South Korean team led by Li In-jung reached the summit via the normal route; this was the eighth ascent to the peak. The year 1981 marked several expeditions: the largest contingent, 13 climbers of a team organized by the Sport-Eiselin of Zurich and led by H. V. Kaenel, made it to the summit along the normal route; in autumn, French mountaineers opened a new route, a variation of the west face route; and a Japanese team, led by Y. Kato, made an ascent via the normal route.

In 1983, two climbers from Yugoslavia, trying to climb the peak from the south face, were buried under an avalanche. One of them was Nejc Zaplotnik, a notable climber of Slovenian origin. A Korean team reached the summit in the autumn of the same year. A German team led by G. Harter was successful in climbing the peak via the south face, which followed the 1972 Tyrolean Route.

On May 10, 1983, four men from the Joint Services East Nepal Expedition made the first British ascent of Manaslu North using a new route, special permission from the Nepalese Government having been granted to access an area normally denied to Europeans; the team was led by Major Douglas Keelan of the Royal Marines and included members from the Royal Navy, Royal Air Force and Royal Marines.

During the winter of 1983–84, a Polish team led by L. Korniszewski successfully followed the Tyrolean Route. On January 12, 1984, Maciej Berbeka and Ryszard Gajewski of that expedition made the first winter ascent via the normal route.

In the spring season of 1984, a Yugoslav team led by Aleš Kunaver climbed the peak via the south face. During the same year, in autumn, Polish teams climbed the south ridge and south-east face.

On November 9, 1986, Jerzy Kukuczka, Artur Hajzer, and Carlos Carsolio made the first climb of the east summit (7894 m) of Manaslu. The next day, Kukuczka and Hajzer reached the summit via a new route, ascending the east ridge and descending the north-east face.

=== 1990s ===
On May 2, 1993, Sepp Brunner, Gerhard Floßmann, Sepp Hinding and Dr. Michael Leuprecht reached the summit via the normal route and descended on skis from 7,000 metres (23,000 ft) to the basecamp. The Austrian expedition was led by Arthur Haid. On December 8, 1995, Anatoli Boukreev summited Manaslu with the Second Kazakhstan Himalaya Expedition. On May 12, 1996, Carlos Carsolio and his younger brother Alfredo reached the summit of Manaslu. For Carsolio it was his fourteenth and final eight-thousander; he became the fourth person in history and the youngest to achieve the feat. In 1997, Charlie Mace made the first American ascent.

=== 2000s ===
During the spring of 2000, there were four expeditions to Manaslu. One climb was on the east face by the 'Japan 2000 Expedition' led by Yoshio Maruyama. The other three were on the north-east ridge: the ETB 2000 Expedition of Spain led by Felix Maria I. Iriate; the 2000 Korean Manaslu Expedition of Korea led by Han Wang Yong; and the Manaslu 2000 Expedition from Italy led by Franco Brunello. On May 22, 2001, a three-member team of Ukraine Himalaya 2001 Expedition comprising Serguiy Kovalov, Vadim Leontiev and Vladislav Terzyul successfully summited Manaslu via the challenging south-east face; all climbed without oxygen support. During the autumn of 2001, three members and a sherpa of the Japan Workers Alpine Federation climbed the peak via the north-east face on October 9, 2001.

On May 13, 2002, five Americans, Tom Fitzsimmons, Jerome Delvin, Michael McGuffin, Dan Percival and Brian Sato and two Sherpas reached the summit.

Piotr Pustelnik and Krzysztof Tarasewicz climbed Manaslu on May 17, 2003. However, Dariusz Zaluski, Anna Czerwinska and Barbara Drousek, who started the climb after Piotr and Krzysztof, had to turn back due to strong winds and bad weather. With this ascent Pustelnik had summited 12 on his way to summiting the world's 14 highest peaks.

On May 28, 2006, Australian mountaineer Sue Fear died after falling into a crevasse on her descent after summiting.

On December 1, 2006, former Formula 1 driver Ukyo Katayama achieved his lifetime ambition of climbing Manaslu, after a prior unsuccessful attempt in 2004.

In 2008, Valerie Parkinson was the first British woman to climb Manaslu.

=== 2010s ===
In 2011 Arjun Vajpai, an Indian mountaineer, summitted Manaslu on October 5 at the age of 18, becoming the youngest climber to have summitted Manaslu.

Eleven climbers were killed in an avalanche on September 23, 2012. American free skier Glen Plake, who had planned to ski down Manaslu without supplemental oxygen, was a survivor.

On September 25, 2014, Polish ski-mountaineer Andrzej Bargiel set a record time from base camp to summit at 14 hours 5 minutes and also record time for base–peak–base of 21 hours 14 minutes.

=== 2020s ===
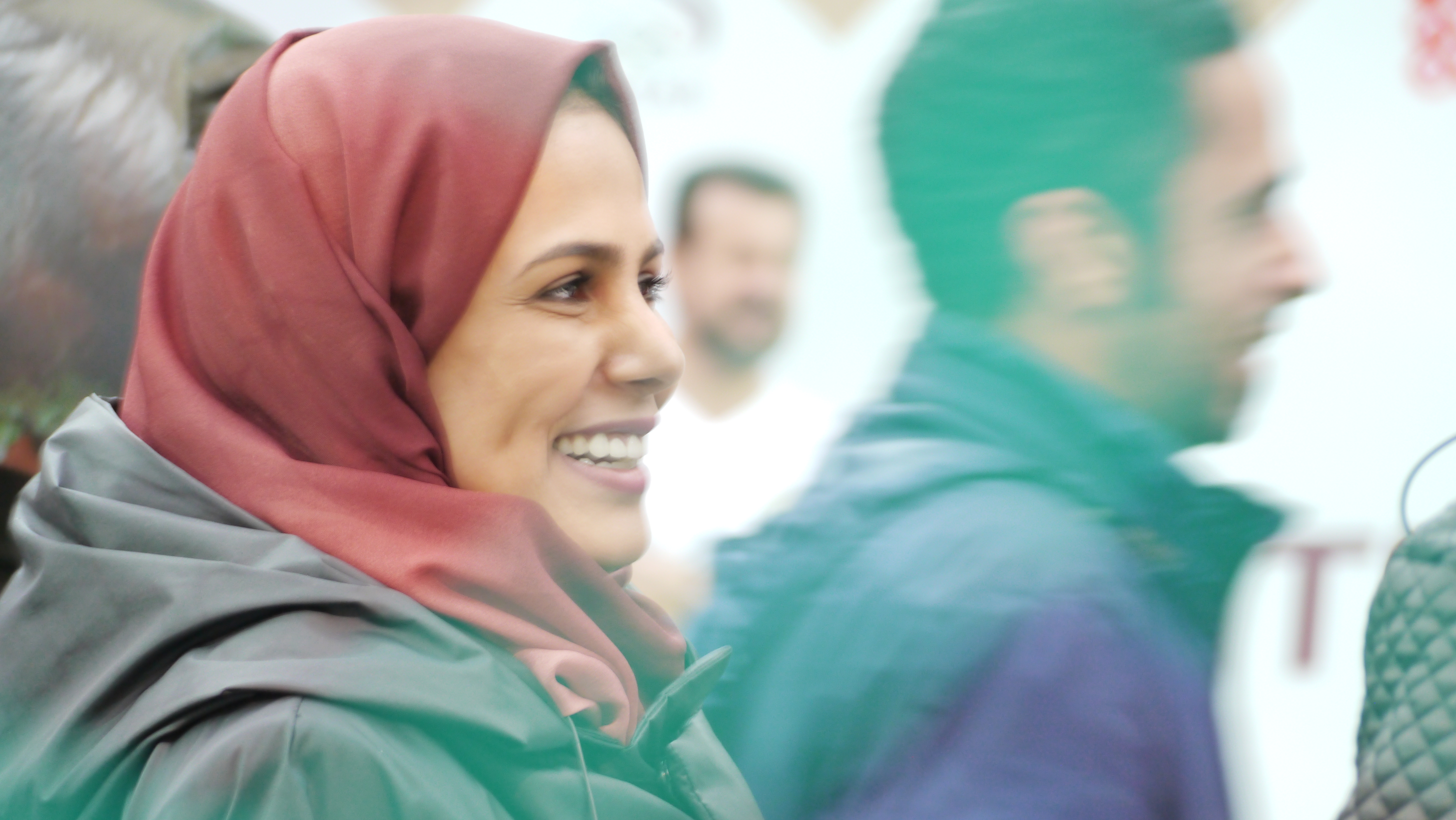
Asma Al Thani

In 2021 Qatari mountaineer Asma Al Thani summited, becoming the first Arab to do so without oxygen.

On the morning of September 26, 2022, an avalanche struck the route at 24,000 ft., just below Camp IV, enveloping 13 climbers, who were injured, and killing Nepali guide Anup Rai. The climbers were ferrying logistics to the high camps before their summit push. On the same day, American ski mountaineer Hilaree Nelson fell down more than 1,800 metres (6,000 ft) from the summit of Mount Manaslu while skiing with her partner, Jim Morrison. On September 28 her body was located above the Thulagi glacier on the south-west face of the mountain and was flown to Kathmandu by rescuers.

On January 6, 2023, Spanish alpinist Alex Txikon, along with six Sherpa climbers, made a winter ascent of Mount Manaslu, which had not been summited in winter in over 20 years.

On September 23, 2023, Nawal Sfendla became the first Moroccan to summit Manaslu.

=== Risk ===
Traditionally, the "spring" or " pre-monsoon" season is the least hazardous for bad weather, snowfall, and avalanches. Manaslu is one of the more risky 8000ers to climb: as of May 2008, there have been 297 ascents of Manaslu and 53 deaths on the mountain, making it "the 4th most dangerous 8000m peak, behind Annapurna, Nanga Parbat, and K2."

==== Avalanches ====
- 2012 September: Nine people were killed and several went missing. The dead included Nepali, a Spaniard and four French nationals. Five climbers were rescued after the avalanche.
- 2022 September 26: Anup Rai, a Nepali mountain guide, died in the avalanche while ferrying loads to Camp IV, and 13 climbers were injured.
- 2022 October 1: An avalanche on the lower flanks of the mountain killed Nepali guide Dawa Chhiring Sherpa, who had been descending from Camp 2 to Camp 1.

=== Verification issues ===
Manaslu has been identified as being one of the most problematic eight-thousanders for summit verification. Like Shishapangma, Manaslu has a false summit that is separated from the true summit by a long and dangerous sharp corniced ridge. In 2021, an investigation by a team of international experts reported in the American Alpine Journal that most climbers who claimed to have summited Manaslu had not, in fact, stood on the true peak.

== Trekking in the region ==
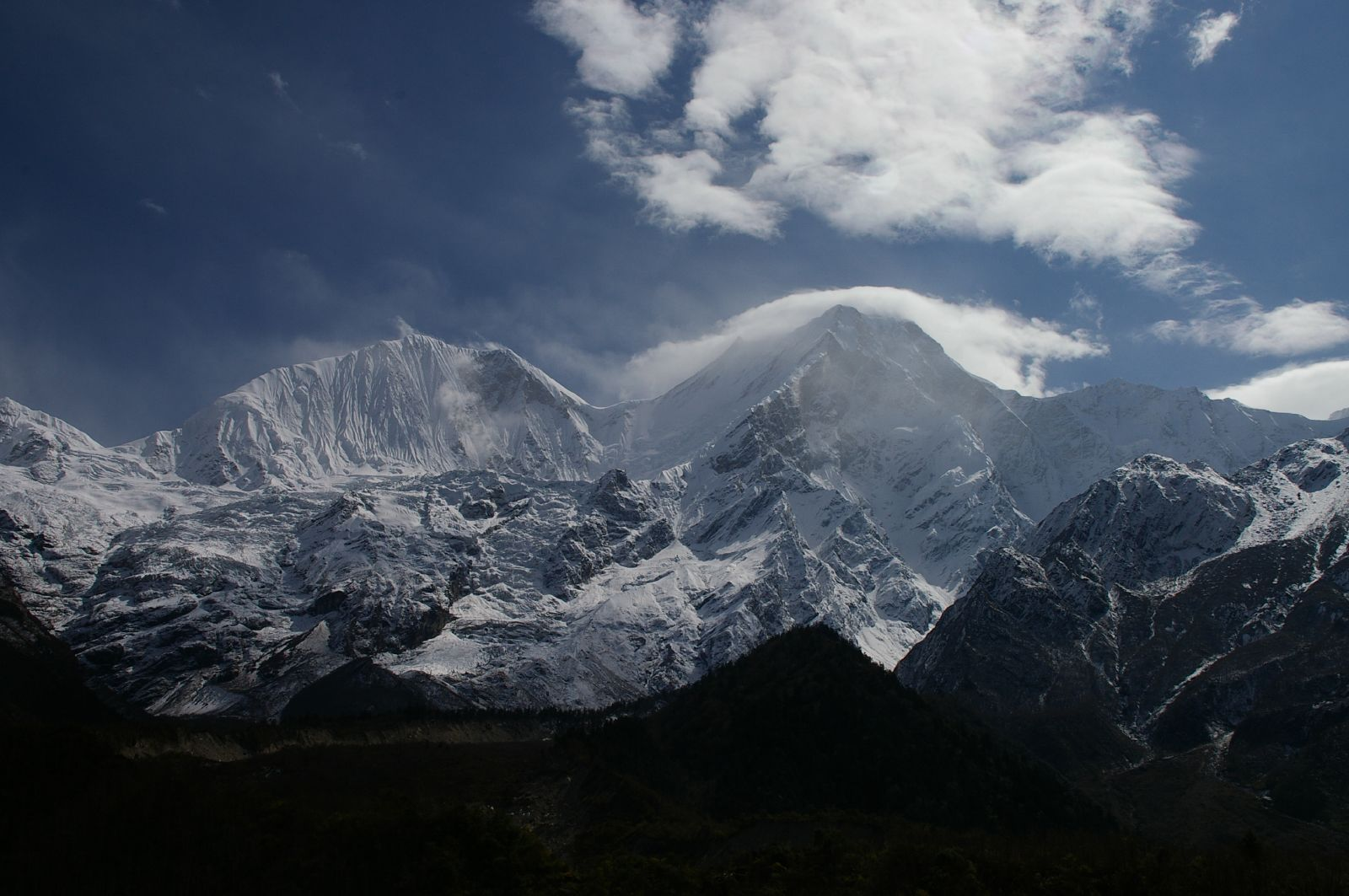

The Manaslu region offers a variety of trekking options. The Manaslu Circuit Trek now usually starts in Arughat Bazaar and ends two to three weeks later in Besisahar, the starting point of the Annapurna Circuit Trek. Until recently the trek required camping, but building of tea-houses means the trek can be completed using local accommodation. The trek requires a Manaslu Restricted Area Permit and Manaslu Conservation Area Permit. The restricted area permit costs $100 US per week in autumn and $70 US per week in other seasons, whereas the conservation area permit costs a straight $30 US. Trekkers are required to travel in a group of at least two persons with a registered guide. The trek lies on the newly developed Great Himalaya Trail.

The best season to hike the circuit is spring (March, April, or May), just before the monsoon season begins. During this period, you can expect dry trails, stable weather, excellent visibility, and long trekking days. Similarly, autumn (September, October, and November) is another good season for the circuit, following the monsoon season.

The trek follows an ancient salt-trading route along the steep sided Budhi Gandaki river. From Deng, the slopes of ravines ease and views of snow peaks start appearing from Ligaon (Lhi). Further from Lhogaon (Lho), an impressive view of Manaslu, with its double peak, appears described as "a soaring monarch with a double-edged summit towering above fields of barley."

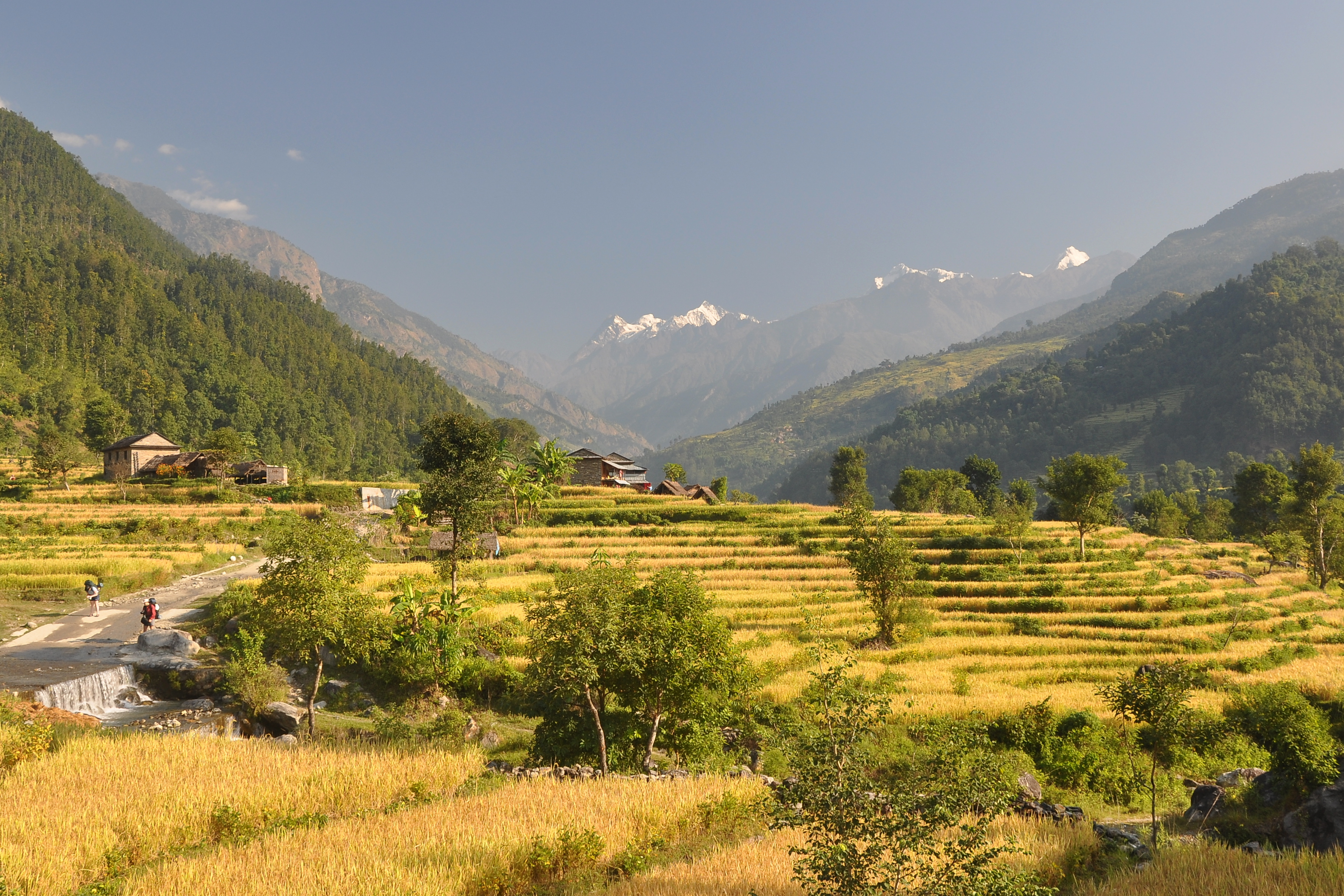
Manaslu circuit trek

The route follows the pine-forested Syala village, which has the backdrop of many horseshoe-shaped peaks, and reaches the village of Samagaon (Sama) at the foot of Manaslu. There is a Buddhist monastery at Samagaon, where monks and nuns reside. After half a day's trek from Samagaon, the village of Samdo is reached. Samdo is the highest village in the Budhi Gandaki valley and is inhabited by Bhotias. This village commands a view of the valley and Pang Phuchi village with a backdrop of the Tibetan border. Further trekking leads along a major secondary valley to the Larkha La (Larkja La). Along this route, Cheo Himal, Himlung Himal (Nemjung) and Kang Guru are seen, along with occasional views of the Annapurna Massif. From here, the meadowland of Bimtang (Bimdakhoti) at elevation 1,500 metres (4,900 ft) is reached, from where Manaslu is clearly visible. From Manaslu, the circuit passes through Dudh Khola (a tributary of Marshyangdi river), criss-crosses Marsyangdi River before reaching Bhulbule, Tarukha Ghat, crosses the Chepe Khola and Dorandi Khola before returning to Gorkha.

Two alternative routes are also popular. One is on the Annapurna Circuit trail but leaves it at Dharapani to reach Manang, crossing Thorong La and Jomsom (Kali Gandaki valley). From Jomsom flights depart to Pokhara. The other alternative route is from Bhulbule, crossing Marsyangdi to Khudi, divert from Annapurna trail and trek cross country through valleys and ridges to Sisuwa town on the bank of Begnas Tal. From here a road approach is available to Pokhara.

When trekking through the Manaslu region, ten peaks of over 6,500 metres (21,300 ft) in height are visible, including peaks of over 7,000 metres (23,000 ft) elevation. People add Tsum Valley and the Ganesh Himal Base Camp as acclimatization trips before going on expeditions through the high passes. The Tsum region, which was restricted for tourists for a long time, is now the centre of attraction for trekkers, with the government of Nepal recently opening it for group tourists. In order to retain its pristine culture and sustain its fragile ecosystem, the Tsum Welfare Committee is involved in the promotion of responsible tourism in Tsum. However, local participation for sustainable tourism is still a challenging task with a long road ahead.

== Area development project ==
Under loan funds provided by the Asian Development Bank, the government of Nepal has an infrastructure project titled "Manaslu Eco-tourism Development Project" under implementation. The objective is to improve the capacity of the Manaslu area to support tourism in an environmentally benign manner.

== Gallery ==
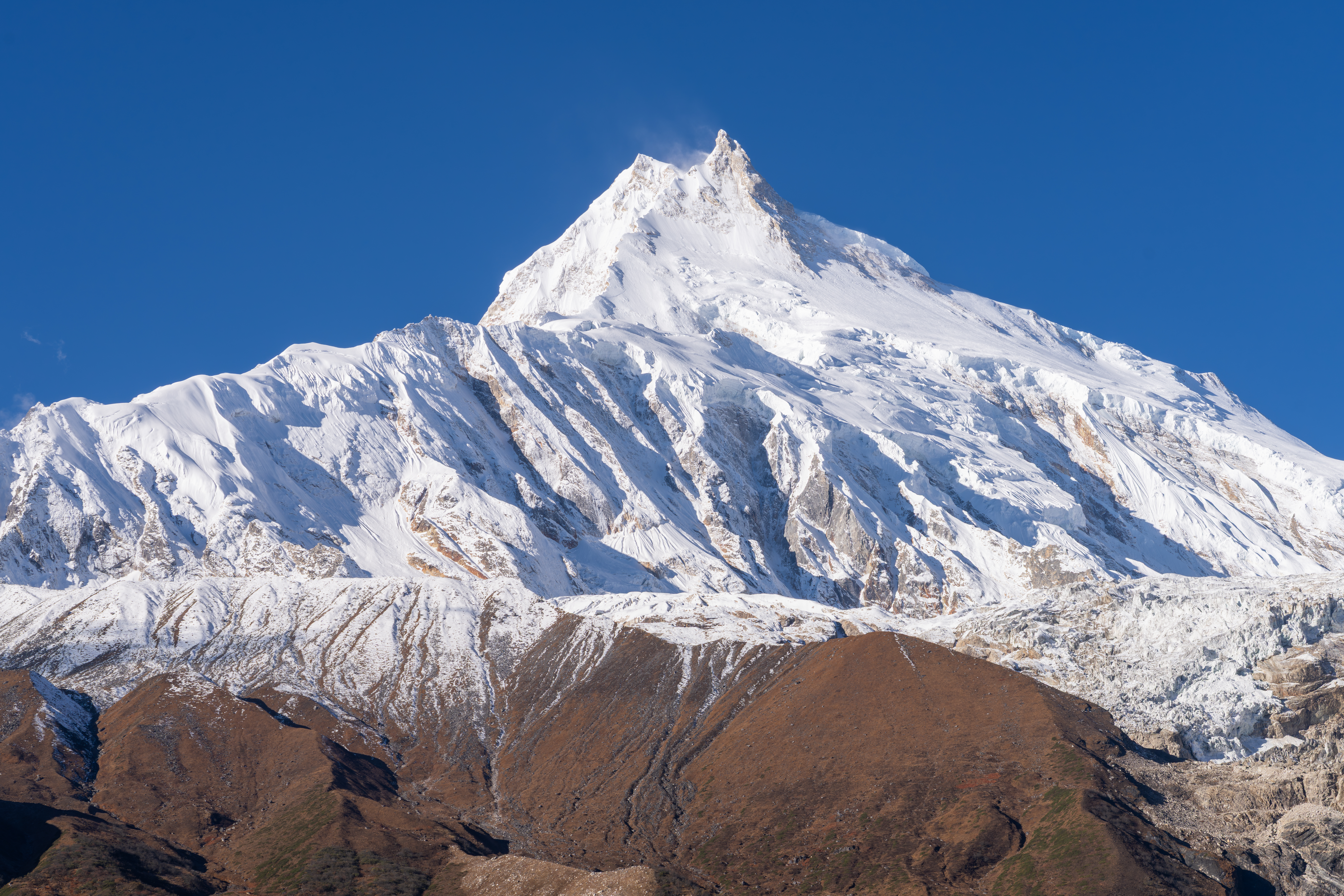
Manaslu

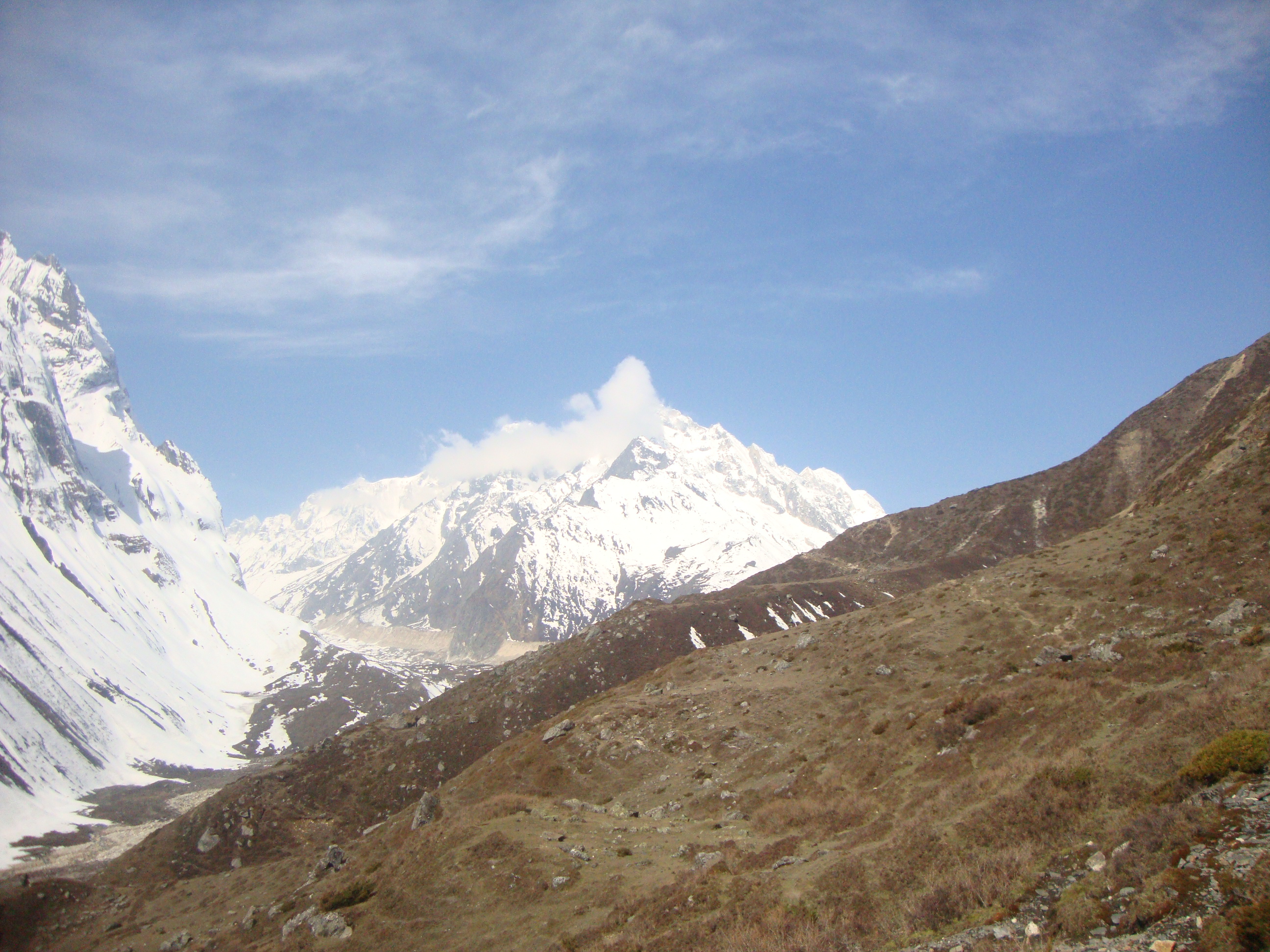
Larke pass way

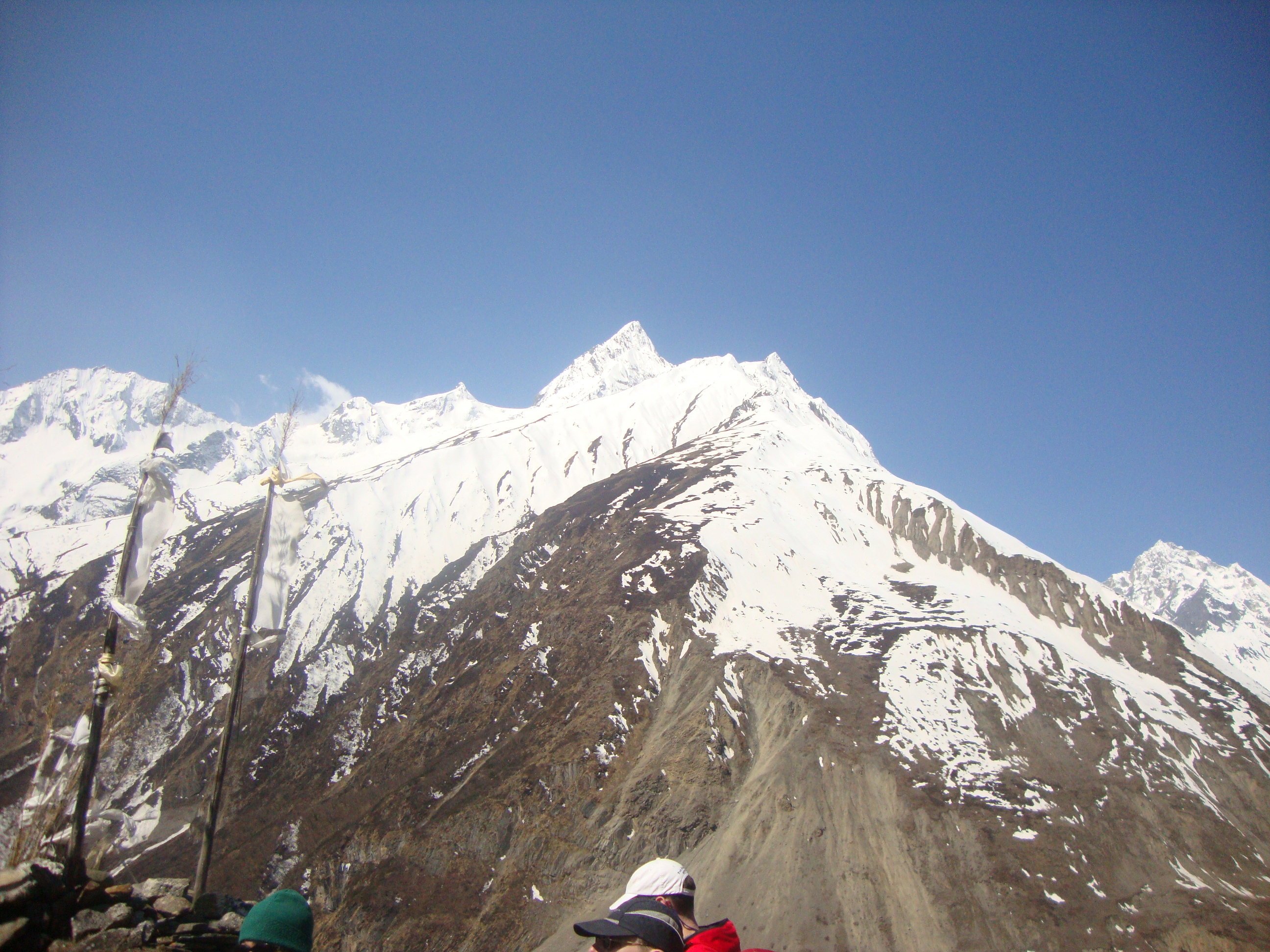
Manaslu, Nepal

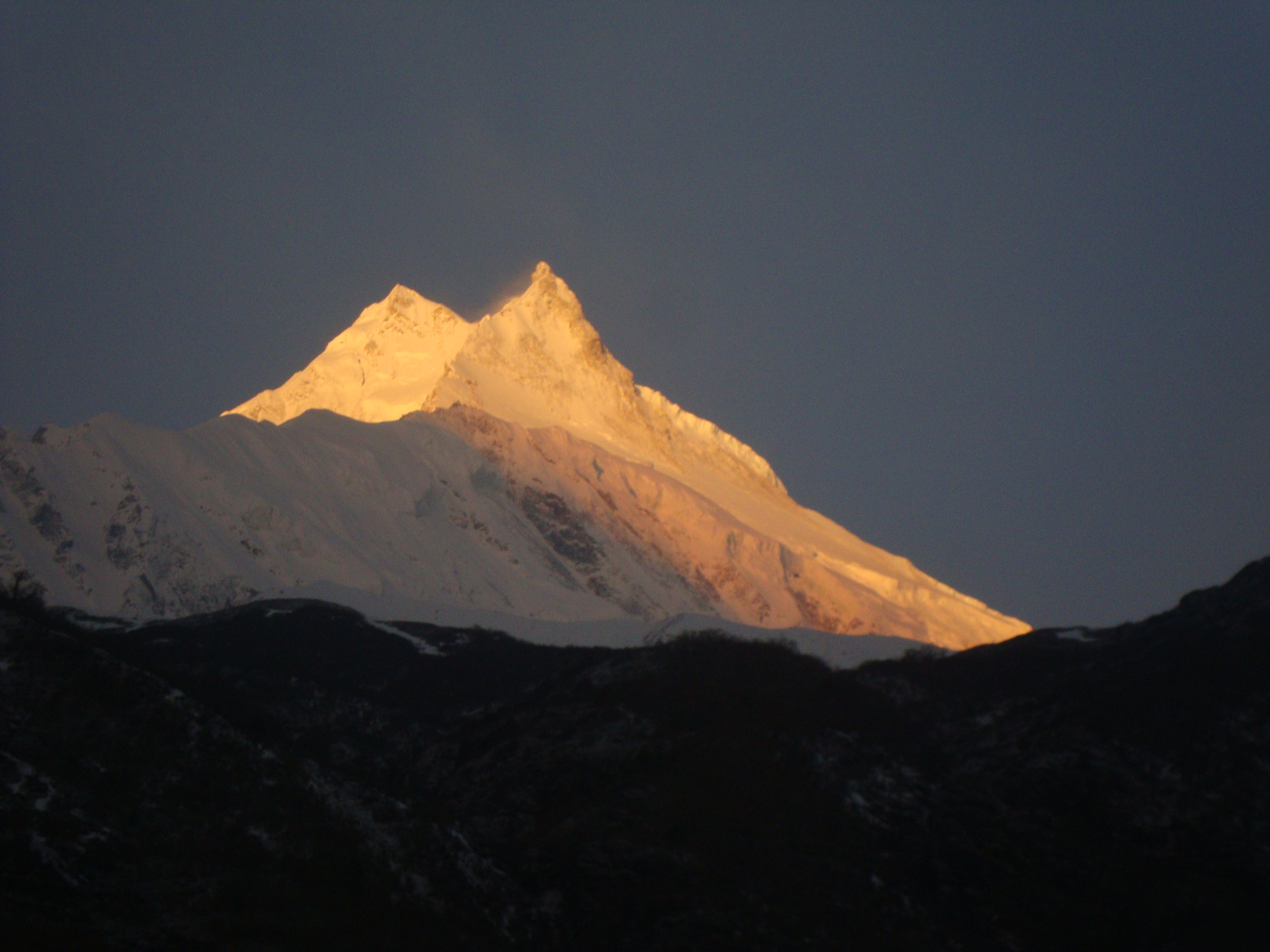
Manaslu during the sunrise

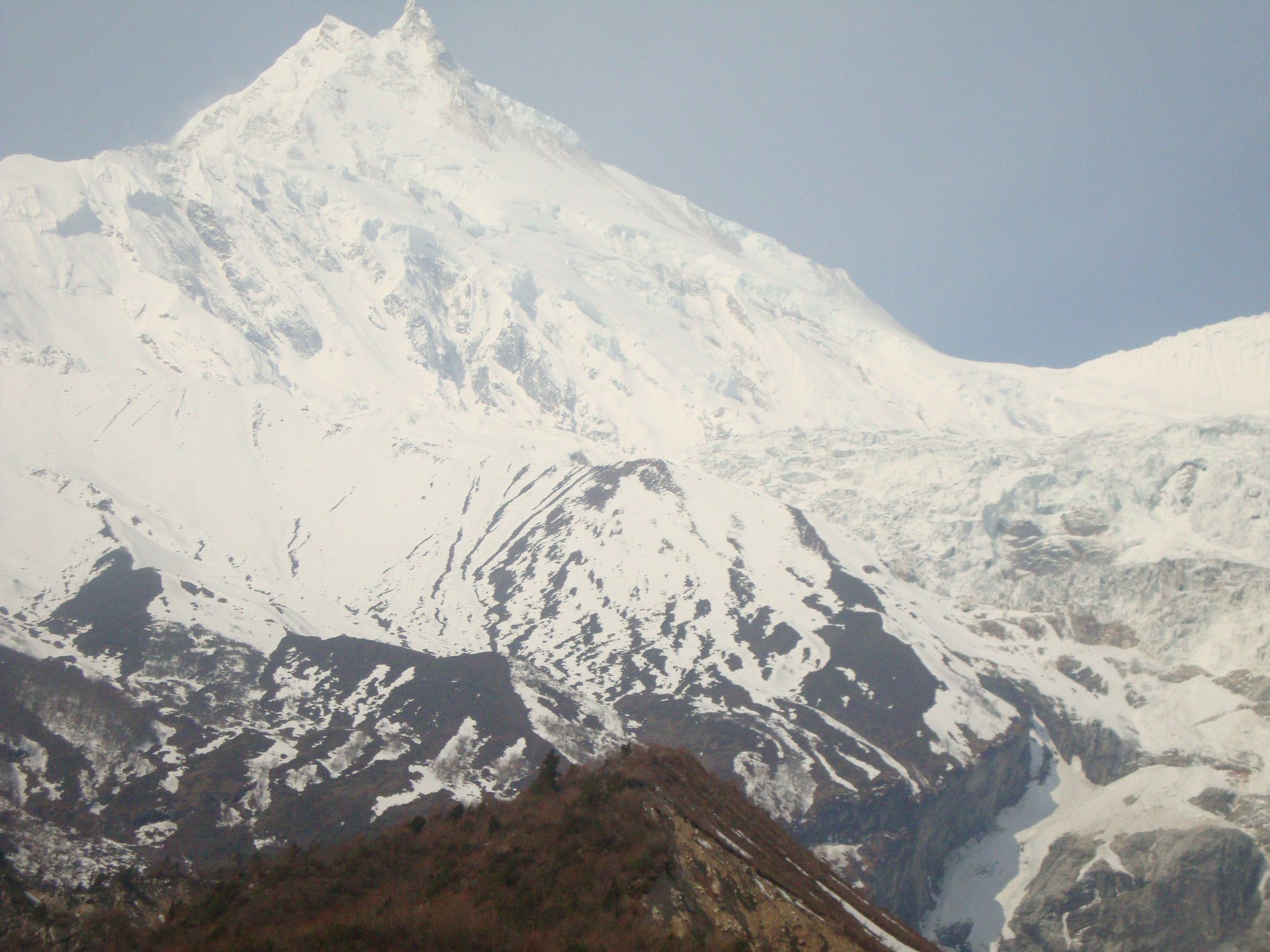
Manaslu before sunrise

== See also ==
- List of mountains in Nepal
- List of deaths on Manaslu
- List of ultras of the Himalayas
