= Kangchenjunga =

3rd-highest mountain on Earth

- Nepali: कञ्चनजङ्गा, romanized: Kañcanajaṅgā; Sikkimese: གངས་ཆེན་མཛོད་ལྔ; Wylie: Gangs Chen mdzod lnga
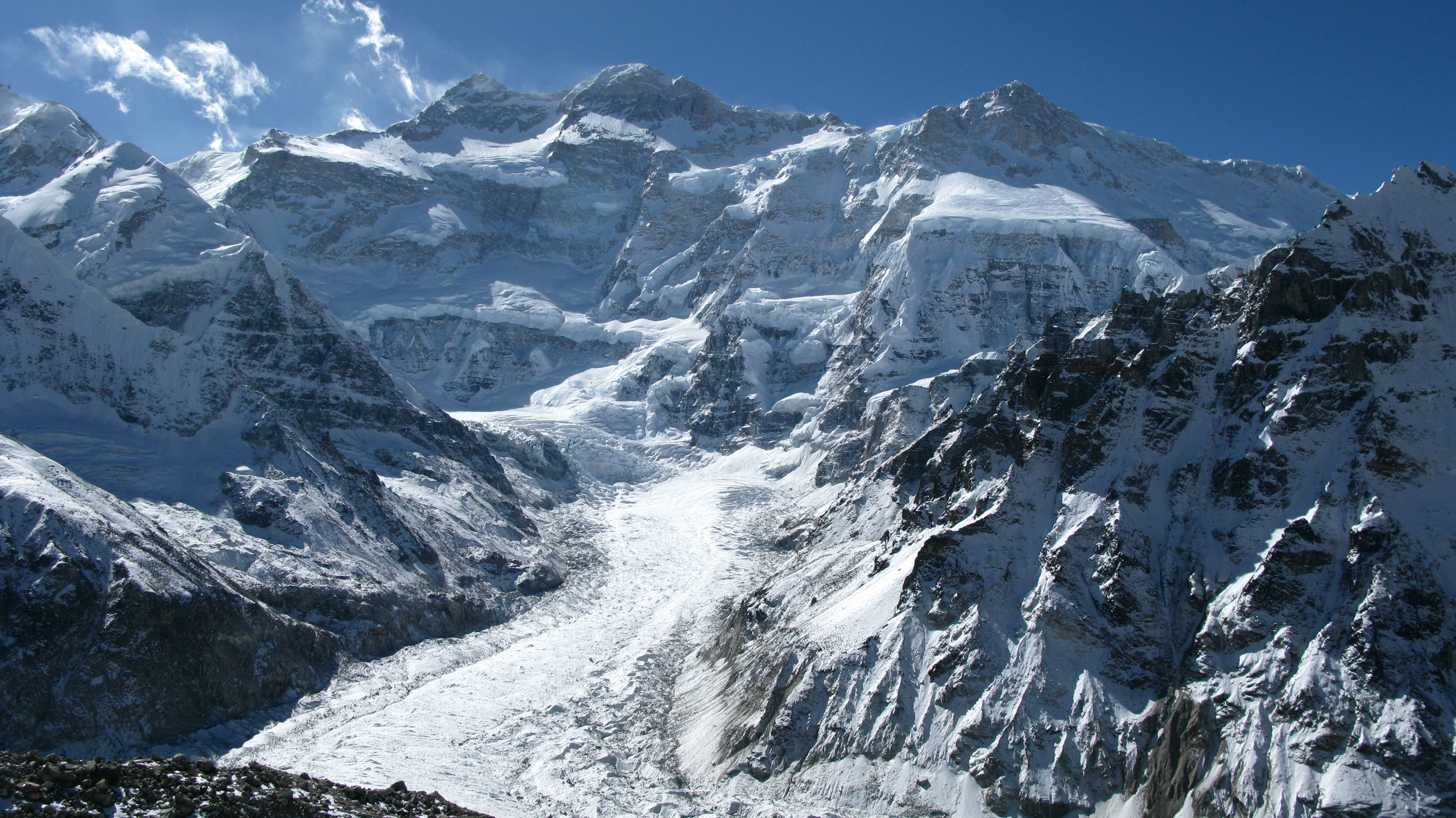
- The north face of Kangchenjunga from Pangpema

Highest point
- Elevation: 8,586 m (28,169 ft); Ranked 3rd
- Prominence: 3,922 m (12,867 ft); Ranked 29th
- Listing: Eight-thousander; Seven Third Summits; List of mountains in India; List of mountains in Nepal; Country high point (India); Ultra-prominent peak
- Coordinates: 27°42′09″N 88°08′48″E

Geography
- The major peaks (not mountains) above 7,500 m (24,600 ft) height in Himalayas, rank identified in Himalayas alone (not the world). Legend: 1：Mount Everest; 2：Kangchenjunga; 3：Lhotse; 4：Yalung Kang, Kanchenjunga West; 5：Makalu; 6：Kangchenjunga South; 7：Kangchenjunga Central; 8：Cho Oyu; 9：Dhaulagiri; 10：Manaslu (Kutang); 11：Nanga Parbat (Diamer); 12：Annapurna; 13：Shishapangma (Shishasbangma, Xixiabangma); 14：Manaslu East; 15：Annapurna East Peak; 16： Gyachung Kang; 17：Annapurna II; 18：Tenzing Peak (Ngojumba Kang, Ngozumpa Kang, Ngojumba Ri); 19：Kangbachen; 20：Himalchuli (Himal Chuli); 21：Ngadi Chuli (Peak 29, Dakura, Dakum, Dunapurna); 22：Nuptse (Nubtse); 23：Nanda Devi; 24：Chomo Lonzo (Chomolonzo, Chomolönzo, Chomo Lönzo, Jomolönzo, Lhamalangcho); 25：Namcha Barwa (Namchabarwa); 26：Zemu Kang (Zemu Gap Peak); 27：Kamet; 28：Dhaulagiri II; 29：Ngojumba Kang II; 30：Dhaulagiri III; 31：Kumbhakarna Mountain (Mount Kumbhakarna, Jannu); 32：Gurla Mandhata (Naimona'nyi, Namu Nan); 33：Hillary Peak (Ngojumba Kang III); 34：Molamenqing (Phola Gangchen); 35：Dhaulagiri IV; 36：Annapurna Fang; 37：Silver Crag; 38：Kangbachen Southwest; 39：Gangkhar Puensum (Gangkar Punsum); 40：Annapurna III; 41：Himalchuli West; 42：Annapurna IV; 43：Kula Kangri; 44：Liankang Kangri (Gangkhar Puensum North, Liangkang Kangri); 45：Ngadi Chuli South; Location of Kangchenjunga
- Location: Taplejung District in Nepal; Mangan district in Sikkim, India
- Parent range: Himalayas

Climbing
- First ascent: 25 May 1955 by Joe Brown and George Band on the 1955 British Kangchenjunga expedition (First winter ascent 11 January 1986 by Jerzy Kukuczka and Krzysztof Wielicki)
- Easiest route: glacier/snow/ice climb

Kangchenjunga (Nepali: कञ्चनजङ्गा, romanized: Kañcanajaṅgā, Sikkimese: གངས་ཆེན་མཛོད་ལྔ; Wylie: Gangs Chen mdzod lnga ) is the third-highest mountain in the world. Its summit lies at 8,586 m (28,169 ft) in a section of the Himalayas, the Kangchenjunga Himal, which is bounded in the west by the Tamur River, in the north by the Lhonak River and Jongsang La, and in the east by the Teesta River. It lies in the border region between Koshi Province of Nepal and Sikkim state of India, with the West and Kangbachen peaks located in Nepal's Taplejung District and the Main, Central and South peaks directly on the border.

Until 1852, Kangchenjunga was assumed to be the highest mountain in the world. However, precise calculations and meticulous measurements by the Great Trigonometrical Survey of India in 1849 showed that Mount Everest, known as Peak XV at the time, is higher. After allowing for further verification of all calculations, it was officially announced in 1856 that Kangchenjunga is the third-highest mountain in the world.

Kangchenjunga is considered a sacred mountain in Nepal and Sikkim. It was first climbed on 25 May 1955 by Joe Brown and George Band, who were part of the 1955 British Kangchenjunga expedition. They stopped just short of the true summit, keeping a promise given to Tashi Namgyal, the Chogyal of the Kingdom of Sikkim, that the top of the mountain would remain inviolate. The Indian side of the mountain is off limits to climbers. In 2016, the adjoining Khangchendzonga National Park was declared a UNESCO World Heritage Site.

== Etymology ==
The brothers Hermann, Adolf and Robert Schlagintweit explained the local name (which they transcribed 'Kanchinjínga'), as meaning "the five treasures of the high snow", and originating from the Tibetan words gangs pronounced [k̀ʱɐŋ], meaning snow and ice; chen, pronounced [t͡ɕʰẽ] meaning great; mdzod pronounced [d͡zø], meaning treasure; and lnga pronounced [ŋɐ], meaning five. The local Lhopo people believe that the treasures are hidden but reveal themselves to the devout when the world is in peril; the treasures comprise salt, gold, turquoise and precious stones, sacred scriptures, invincible armour or ammunition, grain and medicine.

Kangchenjunga is the official spelling used by the Indian Government since the late 19th century; Douglas Freshfield, Alexander Mitchell Kellas and the Royal Geographical Society adopted this spelling, which, it was concluded, provides the most accurate English rendition of the Tibetan pronunciation. Alternative spellings include Kanchenjunga, Khangchendzonga and Kangchendzönga.

== Geography ==
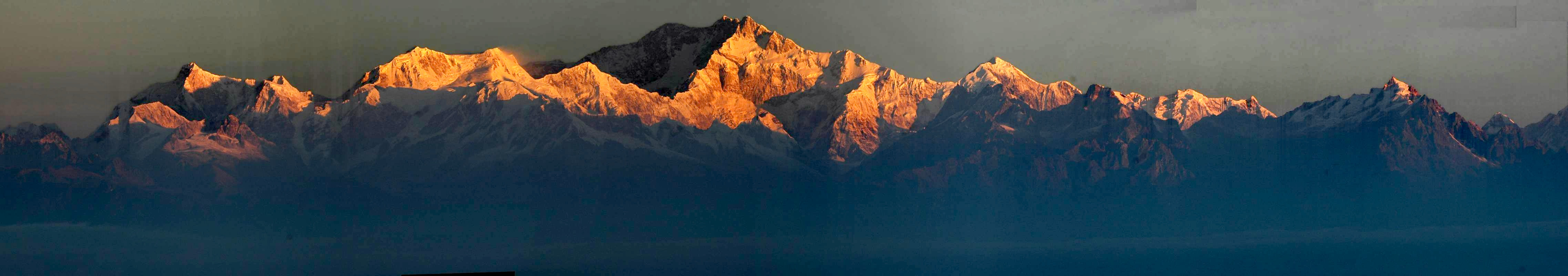
Panorama of the Kangchenjunga massif from Tiger Hill, Darjeeling

The Kangchenjunga Himal section of the Himalayas lies both in Nepal and India and encompasses 16 peaks over 7,000 m (23,000 ft). In the north, it is limited by the Lhonak Chu, Goma Chu and Jongsang La, and in the east by the Teesta River. The western limit runs from the Jongsang La down the Gingsang and Kangchenjunga glaciers and the rivers of Ghunsa and Tamur. It lies in the border region between Koshi Province of Nepal and Sikkim state of India, with the peaks West and Kangbachen in Nepal's Taplejung District, and three of the five peaks, namely Main, Central and South, directly on the border.

Kanchenjunga rises about 20 km (12 mi) south of the general alignment of the Great Himalayan range, about 125 km (78 mi) east-southeast of Mount Everest in a straight line. South of the southern face of Kanchenjunga runs the 3,000–3,500 m (9,800–11,500 ft) high Singalila Ridge that separates Sikkim from Nepal and northern West Bengal. Until 1852, Kangchenjunga was assumed to be the highest mountain in the world, but calculations and measurements by the Great Trigonometrical Survey of India in 1849 showed that Mount Everest, known as Peak XV at the time, is actually higher. After allowing for further verification of all calculations, it was officially announced in 1856 that Kangchenjunga was the third-highest mountain after Everest and K2 of Karakoram.

Kangchenjunga and its satellite peaks form a huge mountain massif. The massif's five highest peaks are listed in the table at the end of this section.

The main ridge of the massif runs from north-northeast to south-southwest and forms a watershed to several rivers. The main ridge intersects with other ridges running roughly from east to west to form a giant cross. These ridges contain a host of peaks between 6,000 and 8,586 m (19,685 and 28,169 ft). The northern section includes Yalung Kang, Kangchenjunga Central and South, Kangbachen, Kirat Chuli and Gimmigela Chuli, and runs up to the Jongsang La. The eastern ridge in Sikkim includes Siniolchu. The southern section runs along the Nepal–Sikkim border and includes Kabru I to III. This ridge extends southwards to the Singalila Ridge. The western ridge culminates in the Kumbhakarna, also known as Jannu.

Four main glaciers radiate from the peak, pointing roughly to the northeast, southeast, northwest and southwest. The Zemu glacier in the northeast and the Talung glacier in the southeast drain to the Teesta River; the Yalung glacier in the southwest and the Kangchen glacier in the northwest drain to the Arun River and Kosi River. The glaciers spread over the area above approximately 5,000 m (16,000 ft), and the glacialized area covers about 314 km^{2} (121 sq mi) in total. There are 120 glaciers in the Kanchenjunga Himal, of which 17 are debris-covered. Between 1958 and 1992, more than half of 57 examined glaciers had retreated, possibly due to global warming.

Kangchenjunga Main is the highest elevation of the Brahmaputra River basin, which forms part of the southeast Asian monsoon regime and is among the globally largest river basins. Kangchenjunga is one of six peaks above 8,000 m (26,000 ft) located in the basin of the Kosi River, which is among the largest tributaries of the Ganges. The Kangchenjunga massif forms also part of the Ganges Basin.

Although it is the third highest peak in the world, Kangchenjunga is only ranked 29th by topographic prominence, a measure of a mountain's independent stature. The key col for Kangchenjunga lies at a height of 4,664 m (15,302 ft), along the watershed boundary between Arun and Brahmaputra rivers in Tibet. It is, however, the fourth-most-prominent peak in the Himalayas, after Everest, and the western and eastern anchors of the Himalaya, Nanga Parbat and Namcha Barwa, respectively.

Name of peak	Height		Coordinates	Prominence		Nearest Higher Neighbour	Location
Name of peak	meters	feet	Coordinates	meters	feet	Nearest Higher Neighbour	Location
Kangchenjunga Main	8,586	28,169	27°42′10.8″N 88°08′53.52″E	3,922	12,867	Mount Everest – South Summit	Mangan district, Sikkim, India / Taplejung, Koshi Province, Nepal
Yalung Kang (Kangchenjunga West)	8,505	27,904	27°42′18″N 88°08′12″E	135	443	Kangchenjunga	Taplejung, Koshi Province, Nepal
Kangchenjunga Central	8,482	27,828	27°41′46″N 88°09′04″E	32	105	Kangchenjunga South	Mangan district, Sikkim, India / Taplejung, Koshi Province, Nepal
Kangchenjunga South	8,494	27,867	27°41′30″N 88°09′15″E	119	390	Kangchenjunga	Mangan district, Sikkim, India / Taplejung, Koshi Province, Nepal
Kangbachen	7,903	25,928	27°42′42″N 88°06′30″E	103	337	Kangchenjunga West	Taplejung, Koshi Province, Nepal

=== Protected areas ===
The Kangchenjunga landscape is a complex of three distinct ecoregions: the eastern Himalayan broad-leaved and coniferous forests, the Eastern Himalayan alpine shrub and meadows and the Terai-Duar savanna and grasslands. The Kangchenjunga transboundary landscape is shared by Nepal, India, Bhutan and China, and comprises 14 protected areas with a total of 6,032 km^{2} (2,329 sq mi):

- Nepal: Kanchenjunga Conservation Area
- Sikkim, India: Khangchendzonga National Park, Varsey Rhododendron Sanctuary, Fambong Lho Wildlife Sanctuary, Kyongnosla Alpine Sanctuary, Maenam Wildlife Sanctuary, Shingba Rhododendron Sanctuary and Pangolakha Wildlife Sanctuary
- Darjeeling, India: Jore Pokhri Wildlife Sanctuary, Singalila National Park, Senchal Wildlife Sanctuary, Mahananda Wildlife Sanctuary and Neora Valley National Park
- Bhutan: Torsa Strict Nature Reserve

These protected areas are habitats for many globally significant plant species such as rhododendrons and orchids and many endangered flagship species such as snow leopard (Panthera uncia), Asian black bear (Ursus thibetanus), red panda (Ailurus fulgens), white-bellied musk deer (Moschus leucogaster), blood pheasant (Ithaginis cruentus) and chestnut-breasted partridge (Arborophila mandellii).

== Climbing routes ==
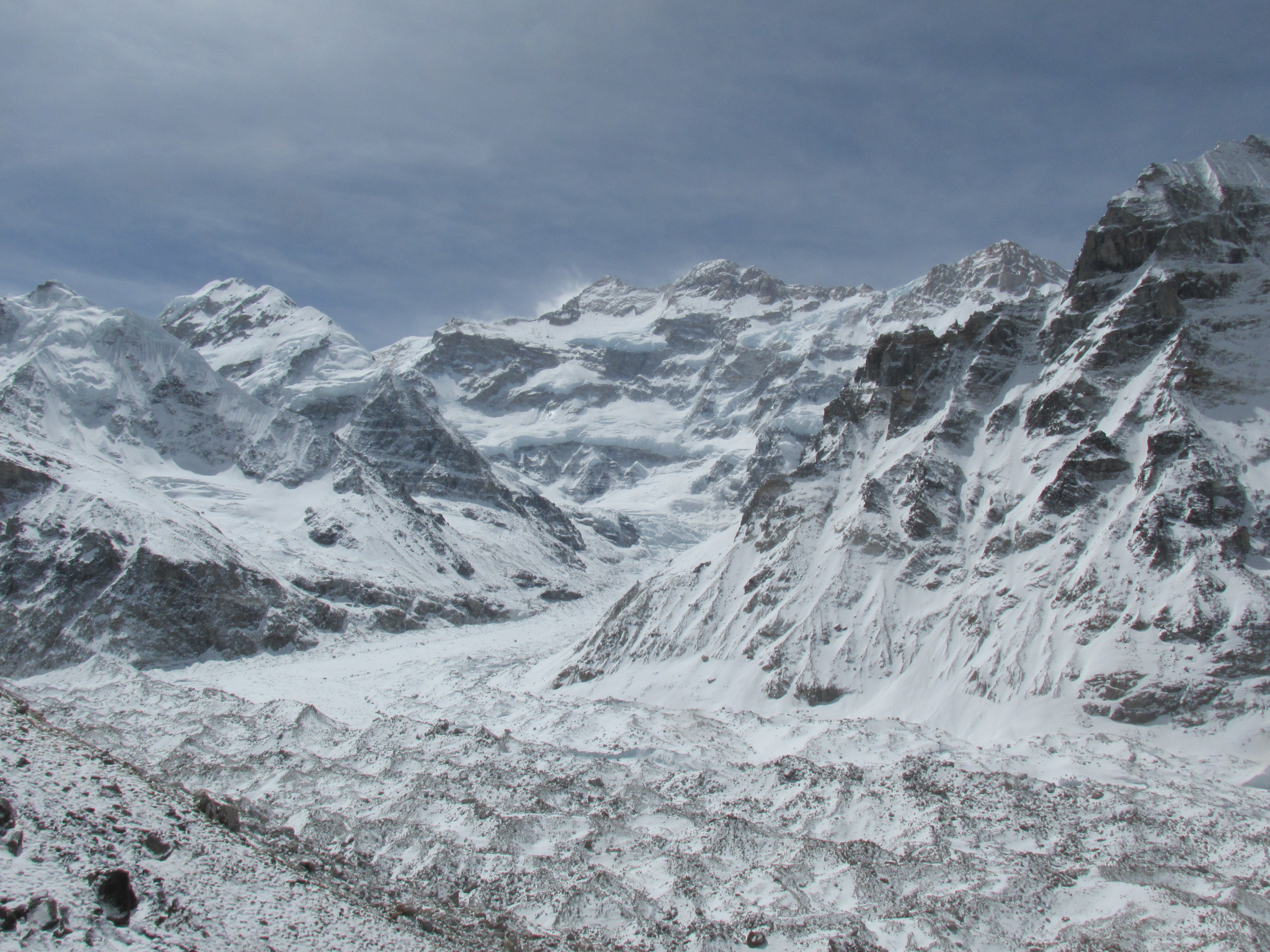
Kanchenjunga-north from base camp in Nepal

There are four climbing routes to reach the summit of Kangchenjunga, three of which are in Nepal from the southwest, northwest, and northeast, and one from northeastern Sikkim in India. To date, the northeastern route from Sikkim has been successfully used only three times. The Indian government has banned expeditions to Kangchenjunga; therefore, this route has been closed since 2000.

== Climbing history ==
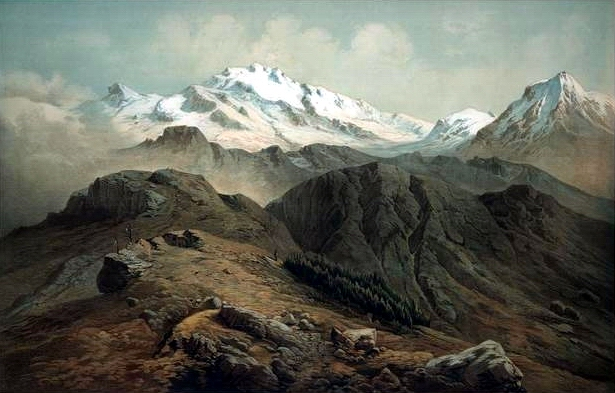
Painting of Kanchinjínga as seen from the Singalila Ridge by Hermann Schlagintweit, 1855

=== Early reconnaissances and attempts ===
- Between April 1848 and February 1849, Joseph Dalton Hooker explored parts of northern Sikkim and eastern Nepal, mainly to collect plants and study the distribution of Himalayan flora. He was based in Darjeeling, and made repeated excursions in the river valleys and into the foothills of Kangchenjunga up to an elevation of 4,760 m (15,620 ft).
- In spring 1855, the German explorer Hermann von Schlagintweit travelled to Darjeeling but was not allowed to proceed further north due to the Third Nepal–Tibet War. In May, he explored the Singalila Ridge up to the peak of Tonglo for a meteorological survey.
- In 1879, Sarat Chandra Das and Lama Ugyen-gyatso crossed into Tibet west of "Kanchanjinga" via eastern Nepal and the Tashilhunpo Monastery en route to Lhasa. They returned along the same route in 1881.
- In 1883, a party of William Woodman Graham together with two Swiss mountaineers climbed in the area of Kangchenjunga. They were the first who ascended Kabru within 9.1–12.2 m (30–40 ft) below the summit. They crossed the Kang La pass and climbed a peak of nearly 5,800 m (19,000 ft) from which they examined Jannu. They concluded it was too late in the year for an attempt and returned once again to Darjeeling.
- Between October 1885 and January 1886, Rinzin Namgyal surveyed the unexplored north and west sides of Kangchenjunga. He was the first native surveyor to map the circuit of Kangchenjunga and provided sketches of each side of the peak and the adjoining valleys. He also defined the frontiers of Nepal, Tibet and Sikkim in this area.
- In 1899, British mountaineer Douglas Freshfield set out with his party comprising the Italian photographer Vittorio Sella. They were the first mountaineers to examine the lower and upper ramparts, and the great western face of Kangchenjunga, rising from the Kangchenjunga Glacier.
- The 1905 Kanchenjunga Expedition was headed by Aleister Crowley who had been part of the team attempting the 1902 ascent of K2. The team reached an estimated elevation of 6,500 m (21,300 ft) on the southwest side of the mountain before turning back. The exact height reached is somewhat unclear; Crowley stated that on 31 August, "We were certainly over 6,400 m (21,000 ft) and possibly over 6,700 m (22,000 ft)", when the team was forced to retreat to Camp 5 by the risk of avalanche. On 1 September, they evidently went further; some members of the team, Reymond, Pache and Salama, "got over the bad patch" that had forced them to return to Camp 5 the day before, and progressed "out of sight and hearing" before returning to Crowley and the men with packs, who could not cross the dangerous section unassisted with their burdens. It is not clear how far Reymond, Pache and Salama had ascended—but in summarizing, Crowley ventured "We had reached a height of approximately 7,600 m (25,000 ft)." Attempting a "mutinous" late-in-the-day descent from Camp 5 to Camp 3, climber Alexis Pache who earlier that day had been one of three to ascend possibly higher than any before, and three local porters, were killed in an avalanche. Despite the insistence of one of the men that "the demon of Kangchenjunga was propitiated with the sacrifice", Crowley decided the accident and its ramifications made it impossible to continue the expedition.
- In 1907, two Norwegians set about climbing Jongri via the Kabru glacier to the south, an approach apparently rejected by Graham's party. Progress was very slow, partly because of problems with supplies and porters, and presumably also lack of fitness and acclimatisation. However, from a high camp at about 6,900 m (22,600 ft) they were eventually able to reach a point 15 or 18 m (50 or 60 ft) below the summit before they were turned back by strong winds.
- In 1929, German Paul Bauer led an expedition team that reached 7,400 m (24,300 ft) on the northeast spur before being turned back by a five-day storm.
- In May 1929, the American E. F. Farmer left Darjeeling with native porters, crossed the Kang La into Nepal and climbed up towards the Talung Saddle. When his porters refused to go any further, he climbed alone further upwards through drifting mists but did not return.
- In 1930, Günter Dyhrenfurth led an international expedition comprising the German Uli Wieland, Austrian Erwin Schneider and Englishman Frank Smythe who attempted to climb Kangchenjunga. They failed because of poor weather and snow conditions.
- In 1931, Paul Bauer led a second German expedition team who attempted the northeast spur before being turned back by bad weather, illnesses and deaths. The team, including Peter Aufschnaiter, retreated after climbing 300 m higher than the 1929 attempt.
- In 1954, John Kempe led a party comprising John W. Tucker, S. R. Jackson, G. C. Lewis, T. H. Braham and medical officer Donald Stafford Matthews. They explored the upper Yalung glacier with the intention to discover a practicable route to the great ice-shelf that runs across the southwest face of Kangchenjunga. This reconnaissance led to the route used by the successful 1955 expedition.

=== First ascent ===
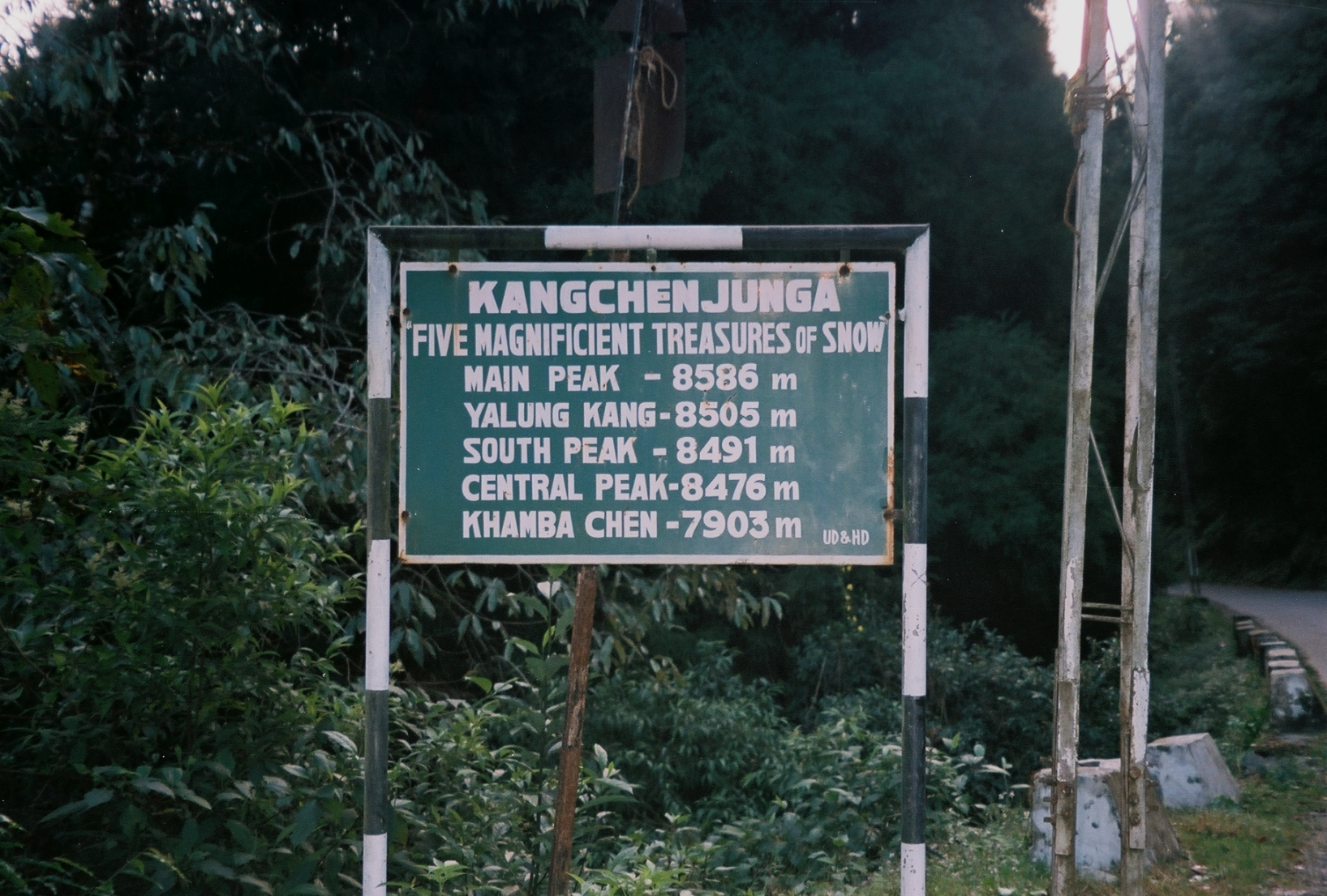
A sign board on the last traversable road to Kangchenjunga

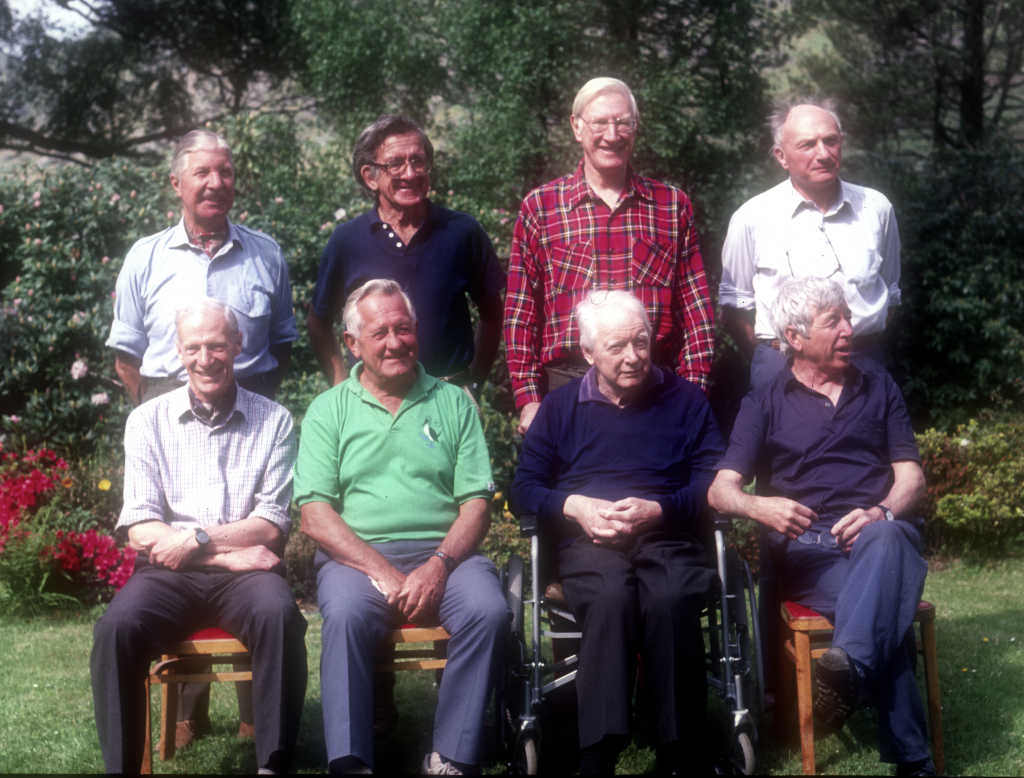
First ascent reunion of 1990–front (left to right): Neil Mather, John Angelo Jackson, Charles Evans and Joe Brown, and rear (left to right): Tony Streather, Norman Hardie, George Band and Professor John Clegg

On 25 May 1955, Joe Brown and George Band made the first ascent, followed by Norman Hardie and Tony Streather on 26 May. The full team also included team leader Charles Evans, John Angelo Jackson, John Clegg, Neil Mather and Tom Mackinnon. The team first made an attempt on the line which John Kempe's party had reconnoitered the previous year. Because of the difficulties on that line they turned to the Yalung Face, which had first been explored by Aleister Crowley's party in 1905. The route starts on the Yalung Glacier to the southwest of the peak, and climbs the Yalung Face, which is 3,000 m (9,800 ft) high. The main feature of this face is the "Great Shelf", a large sloping plateau at around 7,500 m (24,600 ft), covered by a hanging glacier. The route is almost entirely on snow, glacier and one icefall; the summit ridge itself can involve a small amount of travel on rock. The first ascent expedition made six camps above their base camp, two below the Shelf, two on it, and two above it.

They stopped just short of Kangchenjunga's true summit, keeping a promise given to Tashi Namgyal, the Chogyal of the Kingdom of Sikkim, that the top of the mountain would remain inviolate. Everyone was back to base camp by 28 May.

=== Other notable ascents ===
- 1973: Yutaka Ageta and Takeo Matsuda of the Japanese expedition summited Kangchenjunga West by climbing the southwestern ridge. Matsuda never returned to camp and his body was never found. The expedition concluded that he had fallen during descent when he was separated from Ageta.
- 1977: The second ascent of Kangchenjunga, by an Indian Army team led by Colonel Narendra Kumar. They completed the northeast spur, the difficult ridge that defeated German expeditions in 1929 and 1931.
- 1978: Wojciech Wróż and Eugeniusz Chrobak made the first successful ascents of the summits Kangchenjunga South on 19 May; and Wojciech Brański, Zygmunt Andrzej Heinrich, Kazimierz Olech on 22 May on Kangchenjunga Central.
- 1979: The third ascent on 16 May, and the first without oxygen, by Doug Scott, Peter Boardman and Joe Tasker, establishing a new route on the North Ridge.
- 1983: First solo ascent, by Pierre Beghin.
- 1985: The first winter attempt, by a team of three led by the American Chris Chandler, from the north side. Chandler died on the unsuccessful attempt.
- 1986: The first ascent in winter, by Jerzy Kukuczka and Krzysztof Wielicki on 11 January 1986, they followed the route from the SW which was pioneered during the original first ascent.
- 1992: Carlos Carsolio made the only summit that year. It was in a solo climb without supplementary oxygen.
- 1995: Benoît Chamoux, Pierre Royer and their Sherpa guide Riku disappeared on 6 October near the summit.
- 1998: Ginette Harrison was the first woman to climb Kangchenjunga's North Face.
- 2009: Edurne Pasaban, a Spanish mountaineer, reached the summit, becoming the first woman to summit twelve eight-thousanders.
- In May 2009: Kinga Baranowska was the first Polish woman to reach the summit of Kangchenjunga.
- In 2011, Tunç Fındık became the first Turkish man to reach the peak of Kangchenjunga, his seventh eight thousander, with Swiss partner Guntis Brandts via the British 1955 SW Face route.
- In May 2011, Indian mountaineers Basanta Singha Roy and Debasish Biswas successfully scaled Kangchenjunga Main.
- In May 2013, five climbers including Hungarian Zsolt Erőss and Péter Kiss reached the summit, but disappeared during the descent.
- In May 2014, Bulgarian Boyan Petrov reached the peak without the use of supplemental oxygen.
- In May 2014, Chhanda Gayen was the first Indian woman to summit. She was killed by an avalanche on the descent.
- In May 2022, Indian Narayanan Iyer died during a summit push on the mountain.
- In May 2023, German Luis Stitzinger, after having reached the summit, died during an attempted ski descent.

Despite improved climbing gear, the fatality rate of climbers attempting to summit Kanchenjunga is high. Since the 1990s, more than 20% of people have died while climbing Kanchenjunga's main peak.

== In myth ==
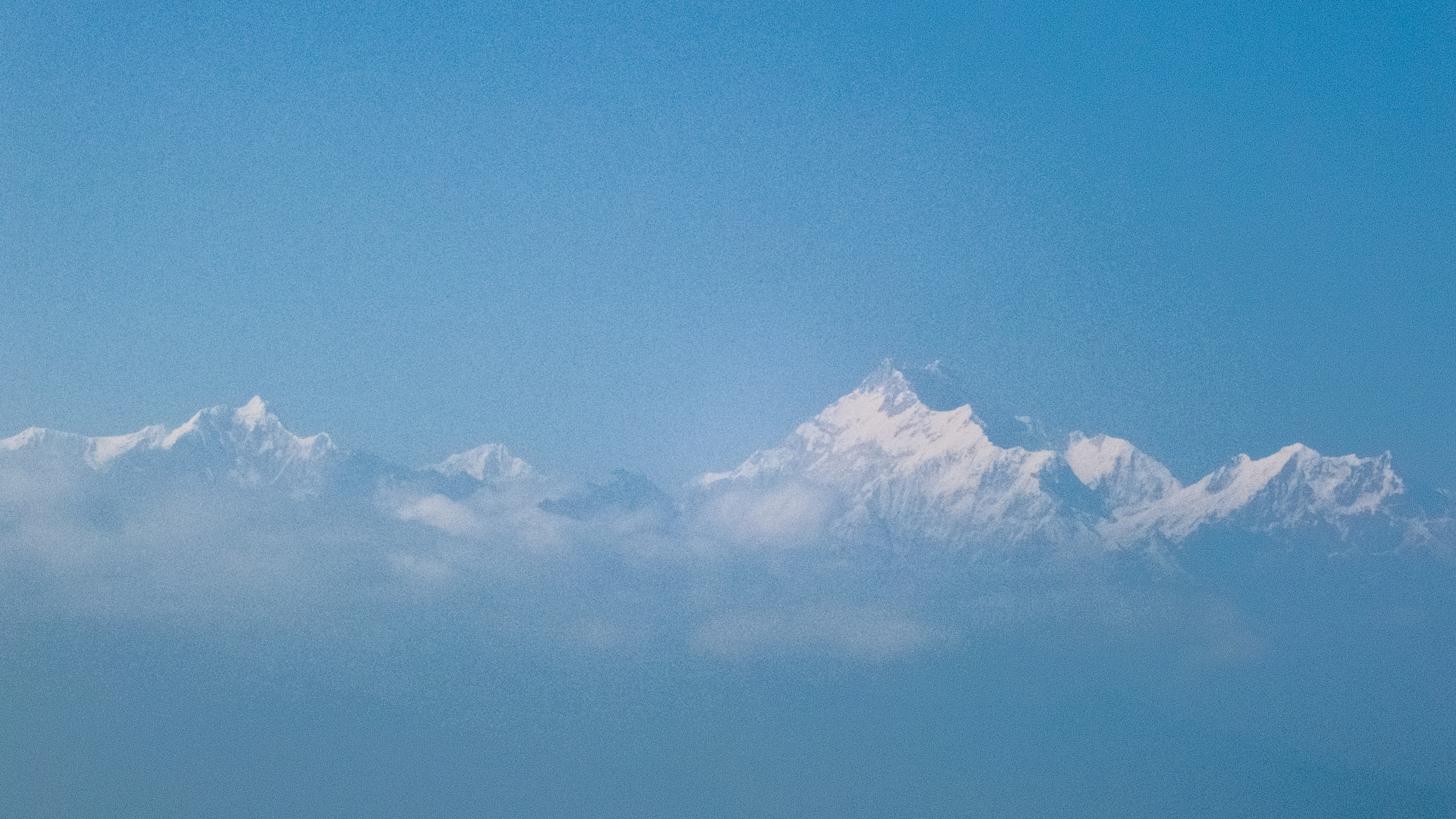
Five Treasures of Snow

The area around Kangchenjunga is said to be home to a mountain deity, called Dzö-nga or "Kangchenjunga Demon", a type of yeti or rakshasa. A British geological expedition in 1925 claimed to have spotted a bipedal creature which they asked the locals about, who referred to it as the "Kangchenjunga Demon".

For generations, there have been legends recounted by the inhabitants of the areas surrounding Kanchenjunga, both in Sikkim and in Nepal, that there is a valley of immortality hidden on its slopes. These stories are well known to both the original inhabitants of the area, the Lepcha people and Limbu people, and those of the Tibetan Buddhist cultural tradition. In Tibetan, this valley is known as Beyul Demoshong. In 1962, a Tibetan Lama by the name of Tulshuk Lingpa led over 300 followers into the high snow slopes of Kanchenjunga, to "open the way" to Beyul Demoshong.

== In literature ==
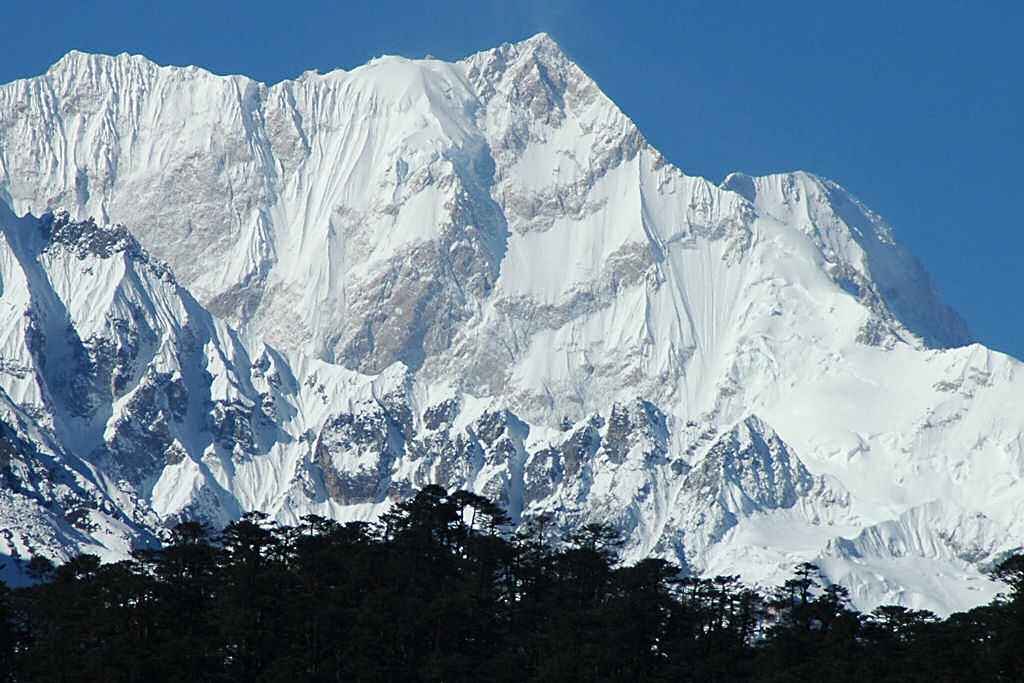
East face of Kangchenjunga, from near the Zemu Glacier, Sikkim

- In The Epic of Mount Everest, first published in 1926, Sir Francis Younghusband: "For natural beauty Darjiling (Darjeeling) is surely unsurpassed in the world. From all countries travellers come there to see the famous view of Kangchenjunga, 28,150 feet (8,580 m) in height, and only 40 miles (64 km) distant. Darjiling (Darjeeling) itself is 7,000 feet (2,100 m) above sea-level and is set in a forest of oaks, magnolia, rhododendrons, laurels and sycamores. And through these forests, the observer looks down the steep mountain-sides to the Rangeet River only 1,000 feet (300 m) above sea-level, and then up and up through tier after tier of forest-clad ranges, each bathed in a haze of deeper and deeper purple, till the line of snow is reached; and then still up to the summit of Kangchenjunga, now so pure and ethereal we can scarcely believe it is part of the solid earth on which we stand; and so high it seems part of the very sky itself."
- In 1999, official James Bond author Raymond Benson published High Time to Kill. In this story, a microdot containing a secret formula for aviation technology is stolen by a society called the Union. During their escape, their plane crashes on the slopes of Kangchenjunga. James Bond becomes part of a climbing expedition in order to retrieve the formula.
- The Inheritance of Loss by Kiran Desai, which won the 2006 Man Booker Prize, is set partly in Kalimpong, a hill station situated near Kangchenjunga.
- In Legend of the Galactic Heroes by Yoshiki Tanaka, which won the Seiun Award for Best Novel of the Year in 1988 and was adapted into an anime series by Kitty Films, the capital and holiest temple of the Terraist Cult is on Earth beneath the rubble of Kangchenjunga.
- Michelle Paver's 2016 ghost story novel Thin Air concerns a fictional expedition to climb Kangchenjunga in 1935, and an earlier (also fictional) expedition in 1906.
- The book Round Kangchenjunga: A Narrative of Mountain Travel and Exploration by Douglas Freshfield gives a complete account of his travel around Kangchenjunga.
- Susan Jagannath's book Chasing Himalayan Dreams: A trek in the Shadow of Kanchenjunga and Everest details her 61 km, six-day trek up and around Kangchenjunga.
- Kate Bush's song "Wild Man": "Well, the first verse of the song is just quickly going through some of the terms that the Yeti is known by and one of those names is the Kangchenjunga Demon. He's also known as Wild Man and Abominable Snowman. (...) I don't refer to the Yeti as a man in the song. But it is meant to be an empathetic view of a creature of great mystery really. And I suppose it's the idea really that mankind wants to grab hold of something [like the Yeti] and stick it in a cage or a box and make money out of it. And to go back to your question, I think we're very arrogant in our separation from the animal kingdom and generally as a species we are enormously arrogant and aggressive. Look at the way we treat the planet and animals and it's pretty terrible isn't it?" (John Doran, "A Demon in the Drift: Kate Bush Interviewed". The Quietus, 2011.)

== See also ==
- List of deaths on Kangchenjunga
- List of elevation extremes by country
- Sacred mountains of India
- List of ultras of the Himalayas
