= Eduard Schlagintweit =

German writer

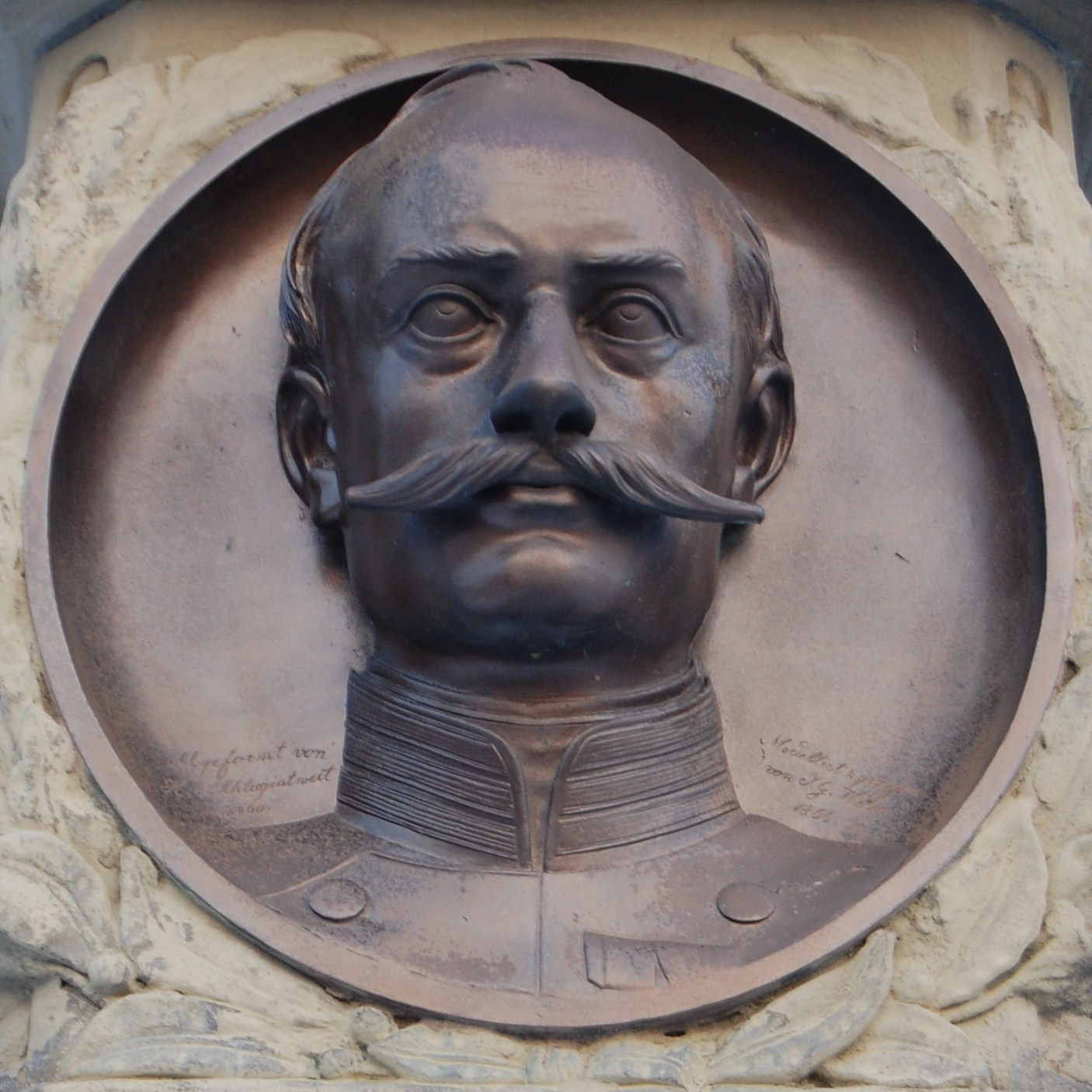
Eduard Schlagintweit

Eduard Schlagintweit (23 March 1831 – 10 July, 1866) was the third of the five Schlagintweit brothers of Munich.

== Life ==
He wrote an account of the 1859–1860 Spanish-Moroccan War.

He was killed in the Austro-Prussian War, at the Battle of Kissingen on 10 July, 1866
