= Hermann von Schlagintweit =

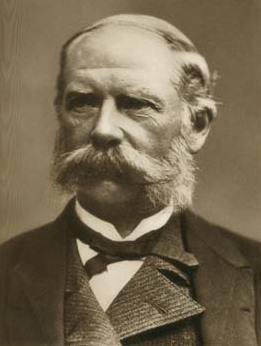
Hermann Schlagintweit.

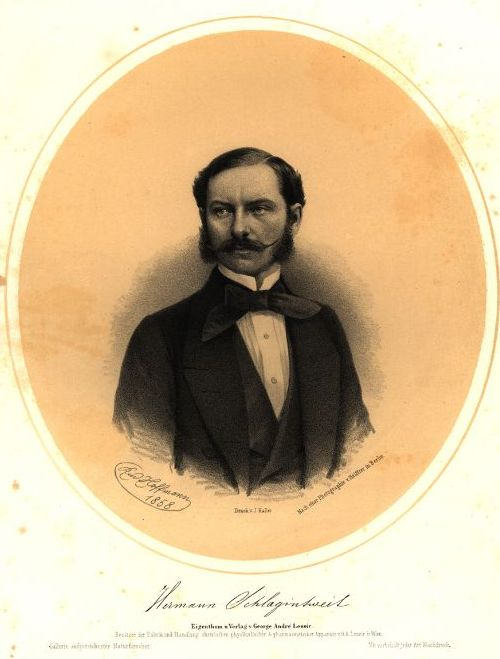
Hermann Schlagintweit.

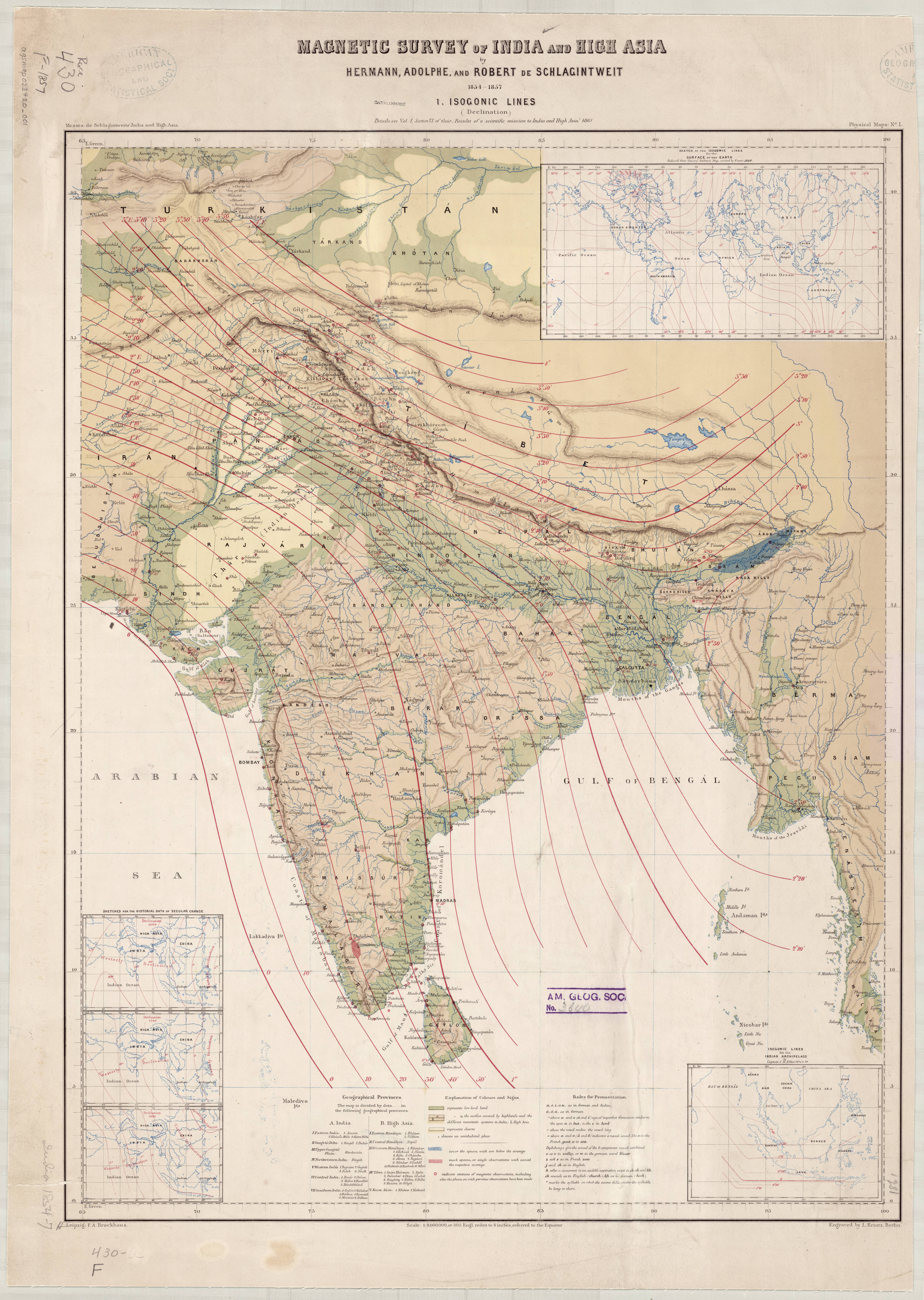
Magnetic survey of India and High Asia, by Hermann, Adolphe, and Robert de Schlagintweit

Hermann Schlagintweit, Sakünlünski (13 May 1826 – 19 January 1882), also known as Hermann Rudolph Alfred von Schlagintweit-Sakünlünski, was a German explorer of Central Asia. Brothers Hermann, Adolph and Robert Schlagintweit were commissioned by the British East India Company to study the Earth's magnetic field in South and Central Asia. They were the first Europeans to cross the Kunlun Mountains and the first to explore the region between Karakoram and Kunlun.

== Life ==
The eldest of the five Schlagintweit brothers of Munich, along with his brother Adolph, he published a scientific study of the Alps in 1846–1848. They established their reputation with the Untersuchungen über die physikalische Geographie der Alpen (1850), and were afterwards joined by brother Robert, and jointly published Neue Untersuchungen über die physikalische Geographie und Geologie der Alpen in 1854.

In 1854, acting on the recommendation of Alexander von Humboldt, the East India Company commissioned Hermann, Adolph, and Robert to make scientific investigations in their territory, and particularly to study the Earth's magnetic field. For the next three years, they travelled through the Deccan, then up into the Himalayas, Karakoram, and Kunlun Mountains. Hermann and Robert were the first Europeans to cross the Kunlun, for which achievement Hermann received the title "Sakünlünski", a German form of the Russian Zakun'lun'skiy (Закуньлуньский) or "Transkunlunian".

Hermann visited Nepal, then returned to Europe, where with Robert he published Results of a Scientific Mission to India and High Asia (four vols., 1860–1866). He spent the remainder of his life in literary and scientific work, both at Munich and at the Schloß Jägersburg castle near Forchheim.

== Standard author abbreviation ==
The standard author abbreviation H.Schlag. is used to indicate this person as the author when citing a botanical name.

== Botanical collections ==
Botanical specimens collected by the Schlagintweit brothers are held at several herbaria around the world, including the Philadelphia Herbarium at the Academy of Natural Sciences (PH) and National Herbarium of Victoria at the Royal Botanic Gardens Victoria.

In 1853, botanist Griseb. published Schlagintweitia, a genus of flowering plants from Europe, belonging to the family Asteraceae, with its name honouring Hermann Schlagintweit and his brothers Adolph and Robert.

== Selected works ==
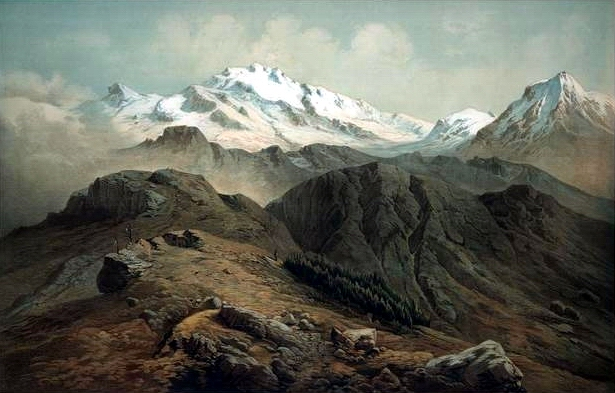
Painting of the Kangchenjunga as seen from the Singalila Ridge, India, by Hermann Schlagintweit, 1855.

- Untersuchungen über die physikalische Geographie der Alpen, 1850.
- Neue Untersuchungen über die physikalische Geographie und Geologie der Alpen, 1854.
- Hermann, Adolph, Robert und Emil Schlagintweit Nachlass (854 - 1857. Weiteres Material zur Asienreise, Photographien und Zeichnungen von Menschen. BSB Schlagintweitiana IV.2.
- Results of a scientific mission to India and high Asia: undertaken between the years MDCCCLIV. and MDCCCLVIII., by order of the court of directors of the Honorable East India Company / by Hermann, Adolphe, and Robert de Schlagintweit : with an atlas of panoramas, views and maps, Leipzig : F.A. Brockhaus; London : Trübner & Co., 1861-66.
- Neue daten über den todestag von Adolph v. Schlagintweit, nebst bemerkungen über mussălmán’sche zeitrechnung, München, Akademische buchdr. von F. Straub, 1869.
- Reisen in Indien und Hochasien. Eine darstellung der landschaft, der cultur und sitten der bewohner, in verbindung mit klimatischen und geologischen verhältnissen. Basirt auf die resultate der wissenschaftlichen mission von Hermann, Adolph und Robert von Schlagintweit, ausgeführt in den jahren 1854-1858, Jena, H. Costenoble, 1869-80.
- Bericht über die ethnographischen gegenstände unserer sammlungen und über die raumanweisung in der K. Burg zu Nürnberg ..., München, Buchdruckerei von F. Straub, 1878.
