= List of past presumed highest mountains =

The following is a list of mountains that have been presumed, at one time, to be the highest mountain in the world. How general the following presumptions were is unclear. Before the Age of Discovery, no geographer could make any plausible assumption.

== List ==
List of past presumed highest mountains
Years Presumed Highest	Mountain name	Height	Mountain Range	Coordinates	Country	Photo
16th century- early 19th century	Chimborazo	6,263 metres (20,549 ft)	Cordillera Occidental, The Andes	01°28′S 78°48′W	Ecuador	Presumed highest from sixteenth century until the beginning of the 19th century. Not in the top 100 highest mountains when measured from sea level, however due to the Earth's equatorial bulge this is the farthest point from the Earth's center.
early 19th century-1808	Nanda Devi	7,817 metres (25,646 ft)	Garhwal Himalaya	30°22′33″N 79°58′15″E	India	Presumed highest in the world in an era when Nepal was still closed to the outside world. Now known to be the 23rd highest mountain in the world.
1808-1847	Dhaulagiri	8,167 metres (26,795 ft)	Dhaulagiri Himalaya	28°41′54″N 83°29′15″E	Nepal	Presumed highest from 1808 until 1847. Now known to be the 7th highest mountain in the world.
1847-1852	Kangchenjunga	8,586 metres (28,169 ft)	Kangchenjunga Himalaya	27°42′09″N 88°08′48″E	Nepal, India	Presumed highest from 1847 until 1852. Now known to be the 3rd highest mountain in the world.
1986	K2	8,611 metres (28,251 ft)	Baltoro Karakoram	35°52′57″N 76°30′48″E	Pakistan (Note: In Pakistan's disputed Gilgit-Baltistan region); China	Discovered in 1856 before Mount Everest's status was officially confirmed, K2's elevation became something of an enigma until it was officially resolved at a later date. News media reported in 1986 that satellite measurements by the University of Washington during an expedition to K2 by George Wallenstein had given a height between 29,064 feet (8,859 m) and 29,228 feet (8,909 m), which would have made it the world's highest mountain. However, this erroneous figure was quickly retracted, and K2's status as second highest was reaffirmed.
1852-present	Mount Everest	8,849 metres (29,032 ft) (Note: Given the large differences between multiple "definitive" measurements of Mount Everest, the height agreed by China and Nepal on 8 December 2020 8,848.86 m (29,031.7 ft) is used for the rounded values. For more information, see Mount Everest#Surveys.)	Mahalangur Himalaya	27°59′17″N 86°55′30″E	Nepal; China	Established as highest in 1852 and officially confirmed in 1856.

== See also ==
- World altitude record (mountaineering)
