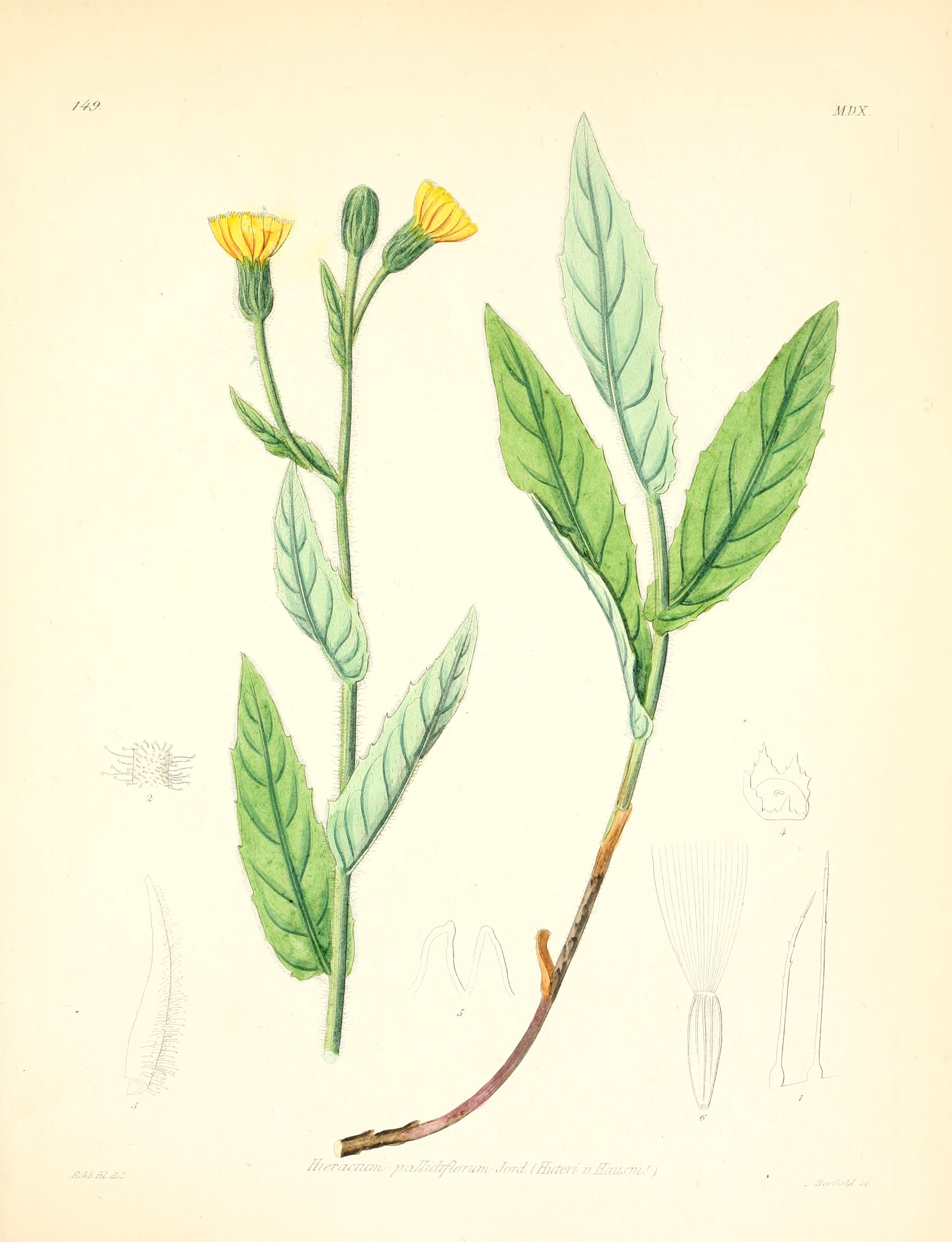
- Schlagintweitia huteri

Scientific classification
- Kingdom: Plantae
- Clade: Embryophytes
- Clade: Tracheophytes
- Clade: Spermatophytes
- Clade: Angiosperms
- Clade: Eudicots
- Clade: Asterids
- Order: Asterales
- Family: Asteraceae
- Subfamily: Cichorioideae
- Tribe: Cichorieae
- Subtribe: Hieraciinae
- Genus: Schlagintweitia; Griseb.

= Schlagintweitia =

Genus of flowering plant

Schlagintweitia is a genus of flowering plants belonging to the family Asteraceae.

Its native range is Europe. It is found in Austria, France, Germany, Italy, Spain and Switzerland.

The genus name of Schlagintweitia is in honour of Adolf Schlagintweit (1829–1857) and his brothers Hermann Schlagintweit (1826–1882) and Robert Schlagintweit (1833–1885). Adolf Schlagintweit, was a German botanist and explorer of Central Asia. Brothers Hermann, Adolf and Robert Schlagintweit were commissioned by the British East India Company to study the Earth's magnetic field in South and Central Asia. It was first described and published in Abh. Königl. Ges. Wiss. Göttingen Vol.5 on page 156 in 1853.

== Known species ==
According to Kew:

- Schlagintweitia chamaepicris (Arv.-Touv.) Greuter
- Schlagintweitia huteri (Hausm. ex Bamb.) Gottschl. & Greuter
- Schlagintweitia intybacea Griseb.
