= Franz Joseph Lauth =

German Egyptologist (1822–1895)

- Resting place: Alter Südfriedhof 10_02_03
- Education: Ludwig-Maximilians-Universität München
- Occupation: high school teacher at Kusel

Franz Joseph Lauth (18 February 1822, Landau, Germany – 11 February 1895, Munich), was a German Egyptologist.

== Career ==
From 1842 to 1845, he studied classical philology at the Ludwig-Maximilians-Universität München. In 1849, he became a teacher at the Wilhelmsgymnasium (Munich).

- From 1863 to 1865 he traveled in Egypt (Part of the Ottoman Empire).
- In 1865 he was appointed professor at the Maximilians Gymnasium and received the Great Golden Medal from Maximilian II of Bavaria, for his chronological studies of the zodiac circle of Dendera and Manetho.
- From this recognition he was able to gain access to the collections at the court and library of king Ludwig I of Bavaria and study the royal collection of Egyptian artifacts held within. He later studied similar collections in Vienna, Trieste, Rome, Florence, Paris, London and Leiden (focusing especially on the papyri). He made major contributions to the newly founded Journal of Egyptian Language and Antiquities. In 1869, he was appointed Honorary Professor of Egyptology at the Ludwig-Maximilians-Universität München and curator of the Egyptian collections.

Some time later, he was heavily criticized for the style of his writings. In the winter from 1872 to 1873, he toured Egypt (Cairo, Alexandria and Luxor), which led to him publish some Travel letters about his experiences there. Subsequent research by others increasingly diminished the importance of his writings. After his resignation in 1882, he was gradually forgotten.

He was elected as a member to the American Philosophical Society in 1872.

== Selected works ==
Lauth published 184 books, papers and miscellaneous writings during his lifetime.

- From Prehistoric Times of Egypt: A clear representation of the Egyptian history and culture from first beginnings to Augustus (in 1879–80)
- The Zodiacs of Denderah: memo where they establish that these are memorial calendars of...
- Manetho and the Turiner King's papyrus (1865)
- The Historical Results of Egyptology (1869)
- Explicatory Index of the monuments of the Egyptian Alterthums (1875)
- Guide to the K. Antiquarium in Munich (1870)
- Papyrus Prisse (82 pages)
- Egyptian Chronology (1877) - 240 pages
- From ancient Egypt: Issue 1 The prehistoric period (544 pages)
- The Stele of Piankhy (1870)
- On the date of the Nativity - Letter to Mr.Bosanquet (1876)

== See also ==
- Ancient Egyptian race controversy
- Menes
- Emil Schlagintweit
- Johann Joachim Winckelmann
