= Emil Schlagintweit =

Emil Schlagintweit (7 July 1835 – 29 October 1904) was a German scholar noted for his work on Buddhism in Tibet.

== Life ==
Schlagintweit was the youngest of the five Schlagintweit brothers of Munich. His father Joseph Schlagintweit was a wealthy eye-surgeon, his mother died when he was quite young, and he was tutored by Franz Joseph Lauth, later a noted Egyptologist. The brothers' interest in exploration was sparked by Alexander von Humboldt's Cosmos, the first volume of which appeared in 1845, and which led to their explorations of the Alps and in turn to Asia's mountains.

After his brother Hermann's death in 1882, he inherited Schloß Jägersburg, their large estate near Forchheim, and the brothers' collections and papers. Not an explorer himself, he sold 102 Tibetan manuscripts and block-books collected by his brothers to the Bodleian Library at Oxford University where they remain.

His work was later used by Helena Blavatsky as evidence for her interpretations of "esoteric Buddhism" (Blavatsky herself did not approve of the term "esoteric Buddhism," to which she preferred "the Secret Doctrine," Occultism, or Sacred Science).

== Selected works ==
- Buddhism In Tibet. With An Account Of The Buddhist Systems Preceding It In India, Leipzig, F.A. Brockhaus, 1863. Online version
- Die Könige von Tibet: von der Entstehung koniglicher Macht in Yárlung bis zum Erlöschen in Ladák : Mitte des I. Jahrh. vor Chr. Geb. bis 1834 nach Chr. Geb., Munchen : Verlag der k. Akademie, in Commission bei G. Franz, 1866.
- Die Gottesurtheile der Indier; Rede gehalten in der öffentlichen Sitzung der Köngl. Akademie der Wissenschaften am 28. März 1866 zur Erinnerung ihres einhundert und siebenten Stiftungstages, München, Im Verlage der Königl. Akademie, 1866.
- Kelat, the Brahui kingdom on the southern border of Iran, Simla, Govt. Central Branch Press, 1876.
- Indien in Wort und Bild (Leipzig, 1880–1881)

== Sources ==
- "'Conquerors of the Künlün'? The Schlagintweit Mission to High Asia, 1854-57", Gabriel Finkelstein, History of Science 38, part 2, no. 120 (June 2000): 179–218.
