= Schlagintweit =

Schlagintweit is a surname. Notable persons with that surname include:

- A German family of 5 brothers, all explorers and scholars, born to Joseph Schlagintweit in Munich:
  - Hermann Schlagintweit (1826–1882), German explorer of Central Asia
  - Adolf Schlagintweit (1829–1857)
  - Eduard Schlagintweit (1831–1866)
  - Robert Schlagintweit (1833–1885)
  - Emil Schlagintweit (1835–1904)
