= Lhonak River =

Coordinates: 27°46′N 88°29′E

Location
- Country: India

Physical characteristics
- Mouth
  - location: Teesta River

Basin features
- River system: Teesta River

The Lhonak River is a tributary of the Teesta River in the Indian state of Sikkim.

== Course ==
The Lhonak originates as a small stream from a glacier in the snowy wastes of northern Sikkim. It generally flows south till it joins the Teesta. The main Himalayan wall with its high snow-clad peaks forms the northern boundary of the catchment. Small glaciers or tongues of perpetual ice descend from the depressions between the ridges into the valleys. They give birth to small streams which join the main channel of the Lhonak. The upper course is along an ancient glacial valley. While the middle and lower courses have been carved by both the action of ice and running water, the side valleys are formed by melt-ice and open into the main valley. No vegetation is found in higher reaches. Alpine pastures occur near the snow line. Subalpine and temperate forests are found at lower elevations. Human habitation in the Lhomak valley is very sparse. It is visited by graziers.

== Lake ==
Lake Lhonak was considered a dangerous lake, which may outburst. Central Water Commission carried out the study and the Department of Science and Technology carried out the bathymetric survey to assess its volume and possible danger of outburst.

== Lhonak valley ==
The Lhonak Valley is a grassland in the exposed river valley of Goma Chu in northwest Sikkim, with boggy marshes, glacial lakes, barren scree slopes and glaciers. Goma Chu rises in North and South Lhonak glaciers and runs across the valley to join Zema Chu, a glacier at the southern end of the valley, as is Green Lake.
