= Adolf Schlagintweit =

German botanist and explorer (1829–1857)

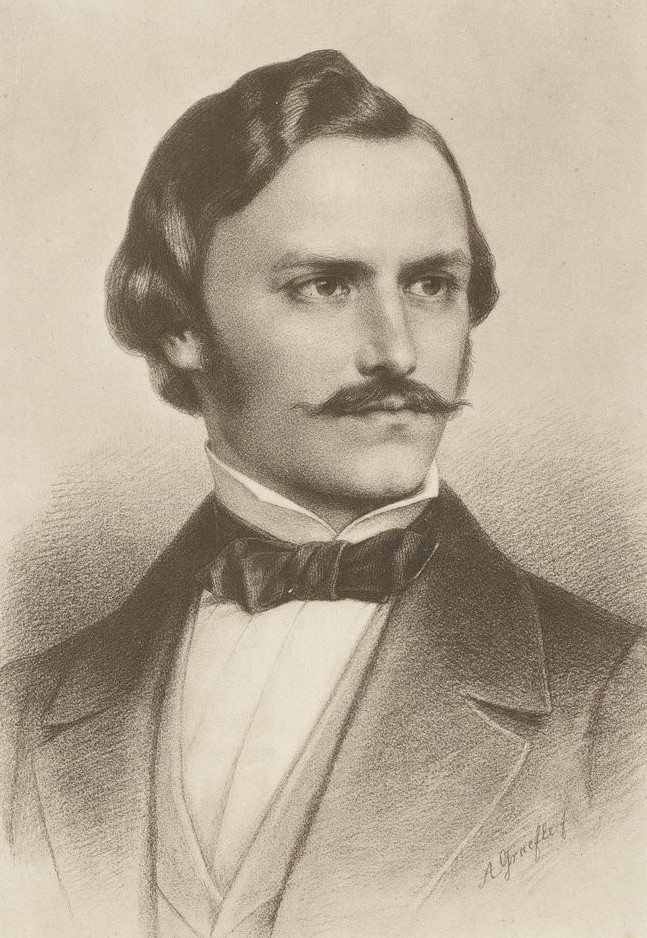
Adolf von Schlagintweit

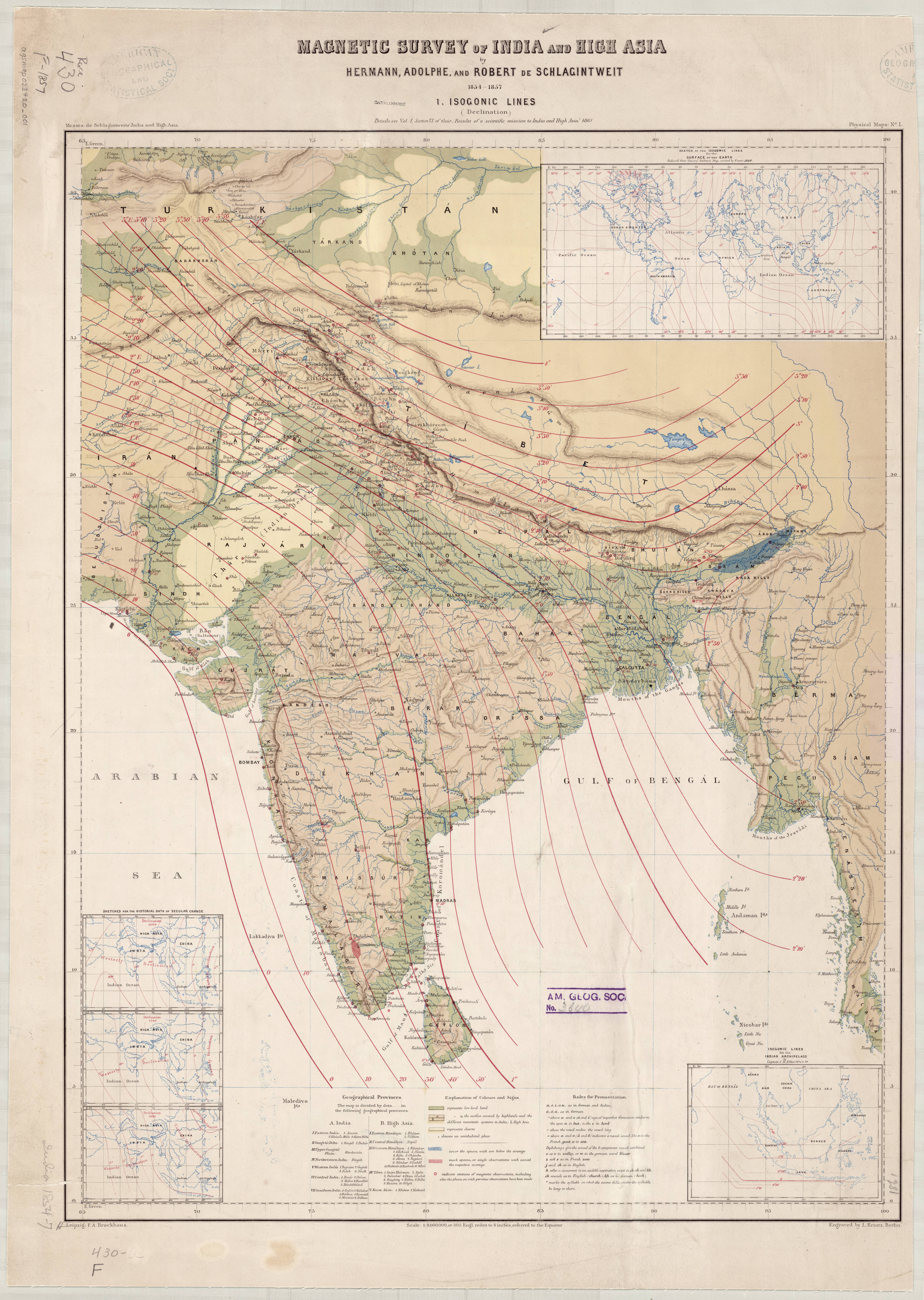
Magnetic survey of India and High Asia, by Hermann, Adolphe, and Robert de Schlagintweit

Adolf von Schlagintweit (9 January 1829 – 26 August 1857) was a German botanist and explorer of Central Asia. Brothers Hermann, Adolf and Robert Schlagintweit were commissioned by the British East India Company to study the Earth's magnetic field in South and Central Asia. They were the first Europeans to cross the Kunlun Mountains and the first to explore the region between Karakoram and Kunlun. After their joint exploration, Adolf Schlagintweit made a separate expedition of his own, crossing the present day disputed Aksai Chin region for the first time. Mistaken for a Chinese spy, he was executed in Kashgar.

== Life ==
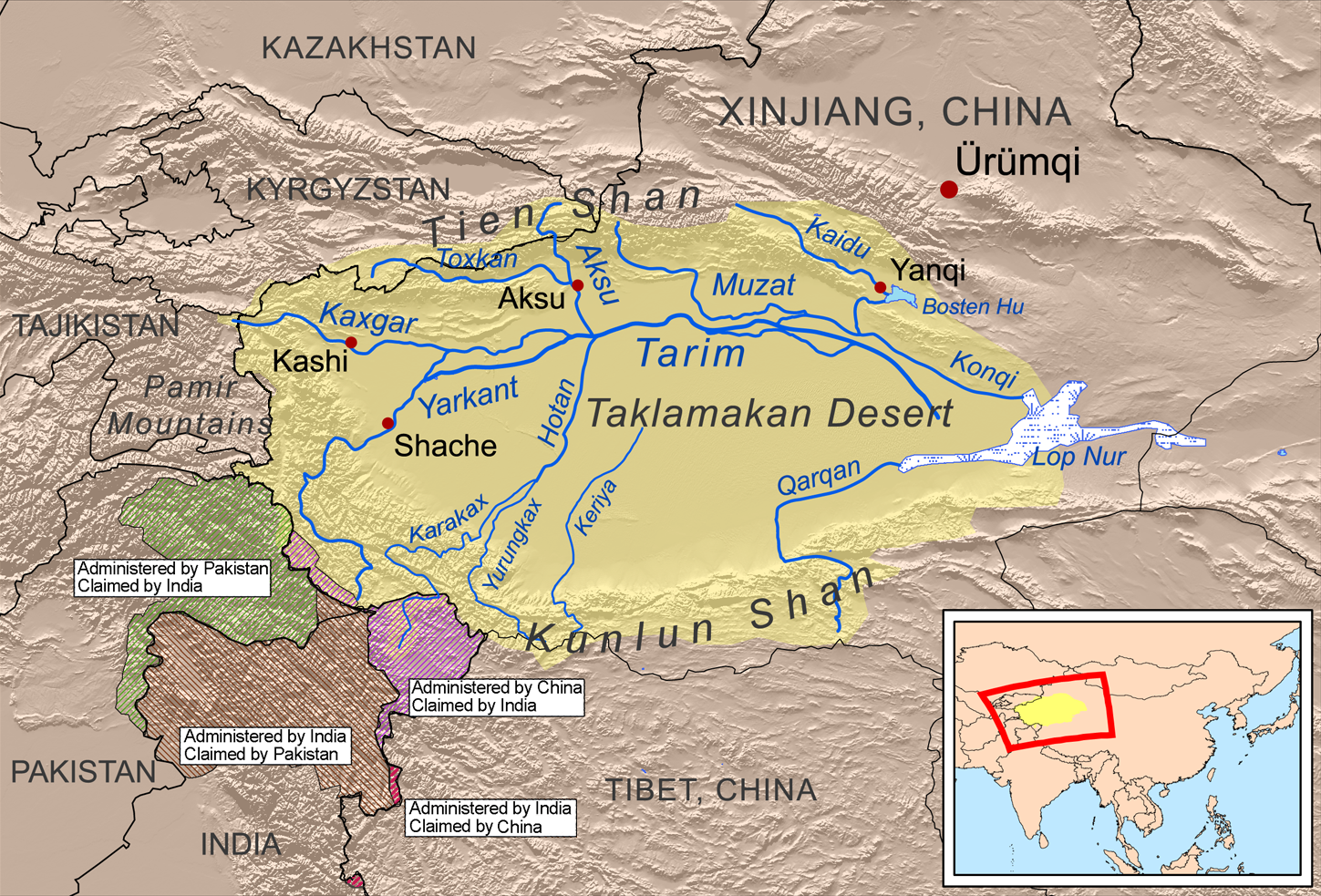
Adolf Schlagintweit was the first to cross the Aksai Chin plateau, marked in purple

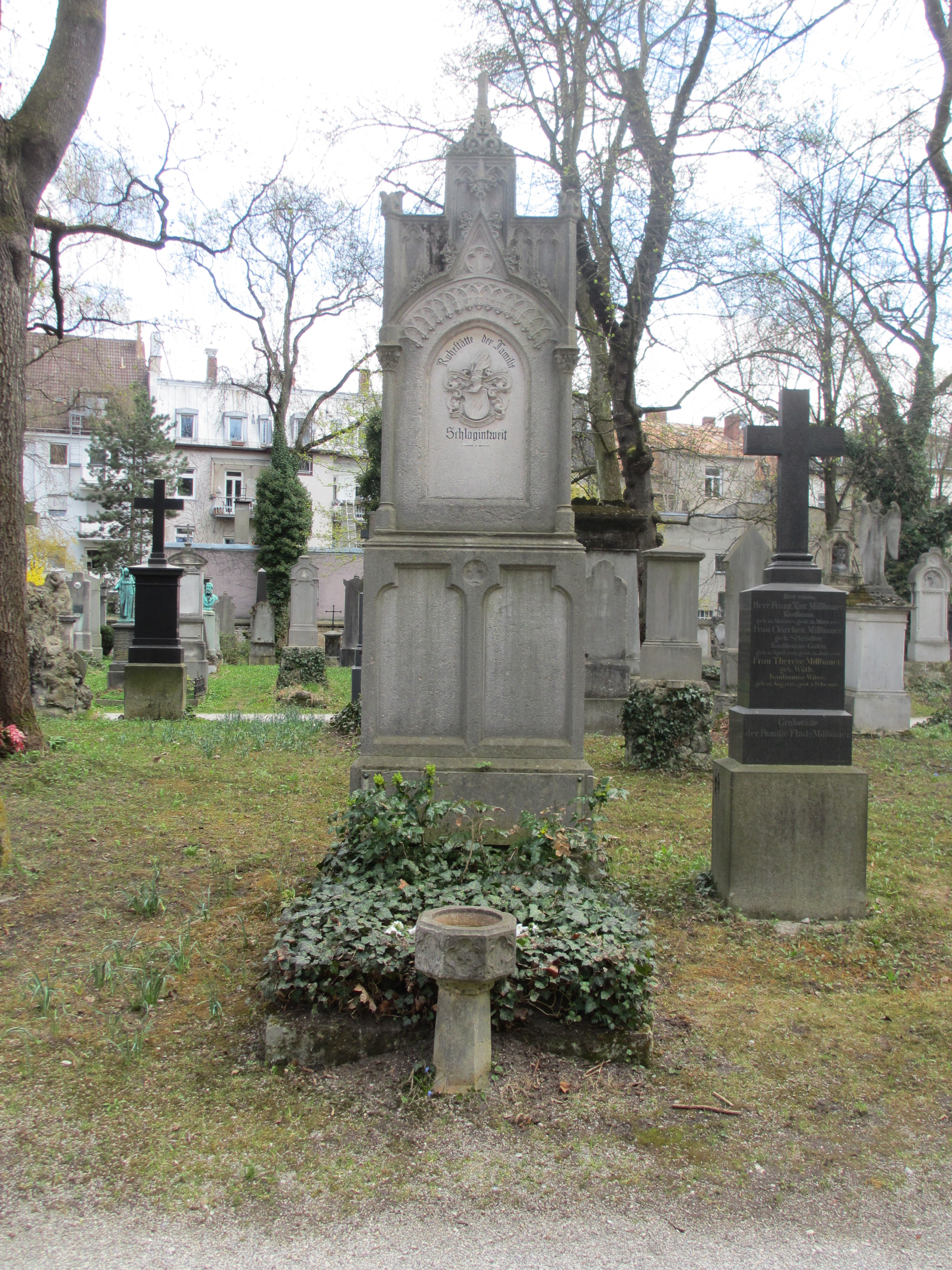
Adolf Schlagintweit grave

The second of five brothers in Munich, Adolf, with his brother Hermann, published a scientific study of the Alps in 1846–1848. They established their reputation with the Untersuchungen über die physikalische Geographie der Alpen (1850), and were afterwards joined by their brother Robert; the three jointly published Neue Untersuchungen über die physikalische Geographie und Geologie der Alpen in 1854.

In 1854, acting on the recommendation of Alexander von Humboldt, the East India Company commissioned Hermann, Adolf, and Robert to make scientific investigations in their territory and particularly to study the Earth's magnetic field. For the next three years, they travelled through the Deccan, then up into the Himalayas, Karakoram, and Kunlun Mountains.

While Hermann and Robert returned from their travels in early 1857, Adolf went back for further exploration on his own. He followed a new, heretofore unknown road via the Chang Chenmo Valley, Lingzi Tang Plains and the Aksai Chin. He gave the name "Great Aksai Chin" to this region, and followed the Karakash River valley to Turkestan. Suspected of being a Chinese spy, and without benefit of a trial, he was beheaded in Kashgar by Wali Khan, the emir of Kashgar in August. The circumstances of his death were not known in Europe until 1859, when Chokan Valikhanov visited Kashgar disguised as a merchant and successfully returned to the Russian Empire with the scientist's head.

The return of his head provided a plot element in Rudyard Kipling's famous story "The Man Who Would Be King" (1888). In 2017 Lahore Museum Pakistan found 50 masks that the Schlagintweit brothers made during their Indian research visit in 1854–58. These ethnographic masks of various Indian communities shed light on Indian ethnic diversity.

== Standard author abbreviation ==
The standard author abbreviation A.Schlag. is used to indicate this person as the author when citing a botanical name.

== Botanical collections ==
Botanical specimens collected by the Schlagintweit brothers are held at several herbaria around the world, including the Philadelphia Herbarium at the Academy of Natural Sciences (PH) and National Herbarium of Victoria at the Royal Botanic Gardens Victoria.

In 1853, botanist Griseb. published Schlagintweitia, a genus of flowering plants from Europe, belonging to the family Asteraceae, with its name honouring Adolf Schlagintweit and his brothers Herman and Robert.
