= Robert von Schlagintweit =

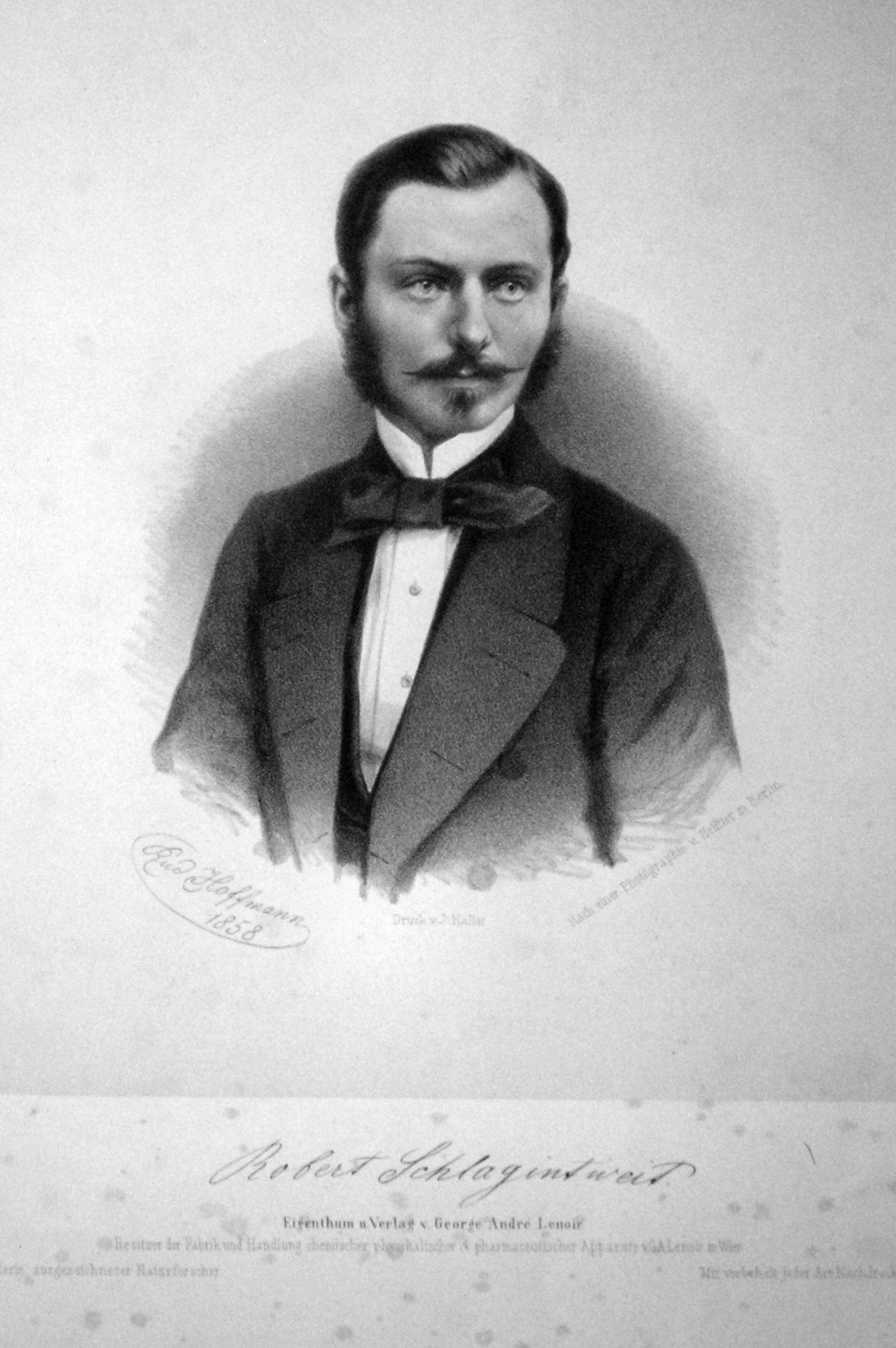
Robert Schlagintweit

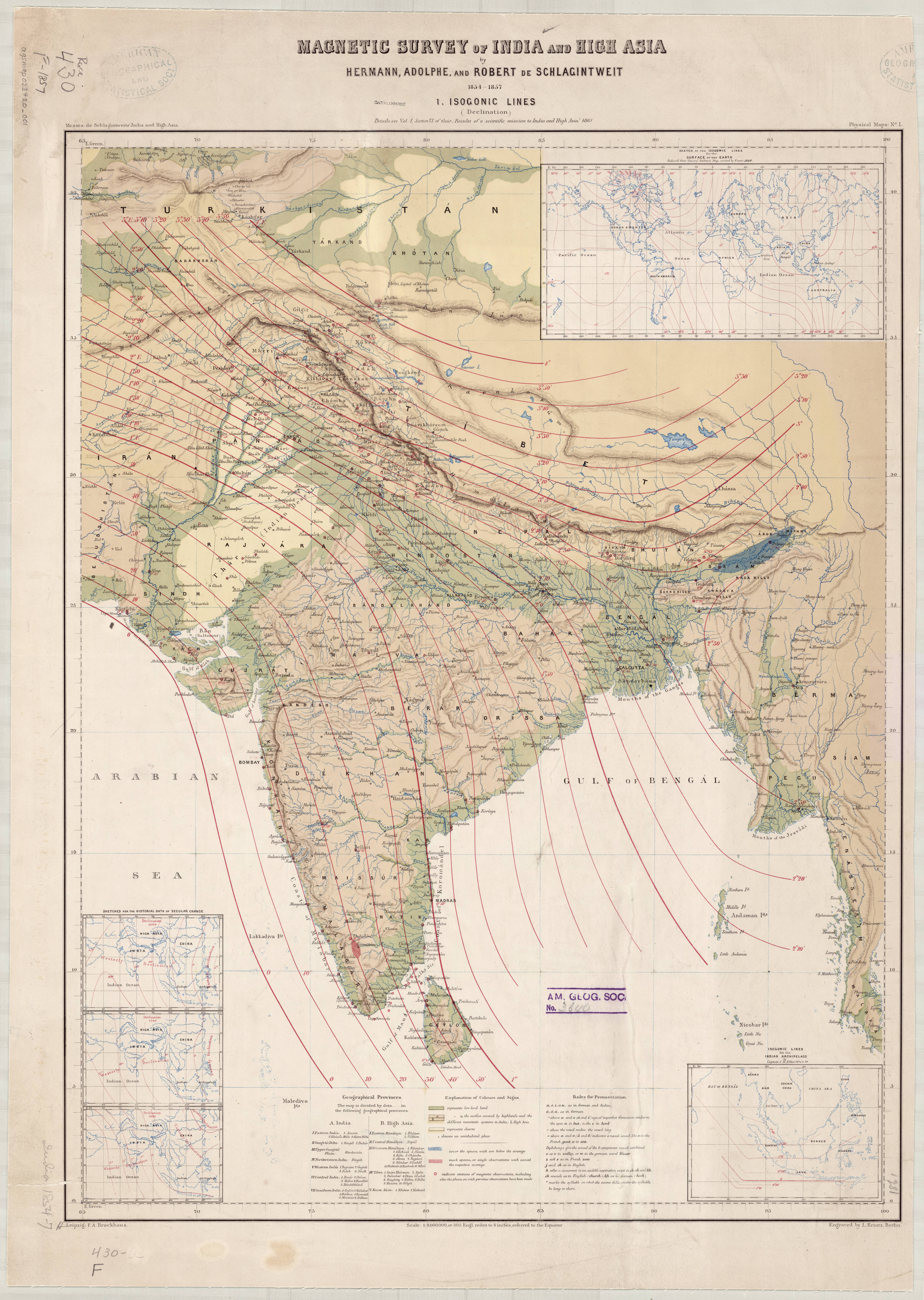
Magnetic survey of India and High Asia, by Hermann, Adolphe, and Robert de Schlagintweit

Robert von Schlagintweit (24 October 1833 – 6 June 1885) was a German explorer of Central Asia who also wrote about travels in America. Brothers Hermann, Adolf and Robert Schlagintweit were commissioned by the British East India Company to study the Earth's magnetic field in South and Central Asia. They were the first Europeans to cross the Kunlun Mountains and the first to explore the region between Karakoram and Kunlun.

== Life ==
The fourth of the five Schlagintweit brothers of Munich joined his brothers Hermann and Adolf at an early age in their Alpine researches and jointly published Neue Untersuchungen über die physikalische Geographie und Geologie der Alpen in 1854.

In 1854, acting on the recommendation of Alexander von Humboldt, the East India Company commissioned Hermann, Adolf, and Robert to make scientific investigations in their territory and particularly to study the Earth's magnetic field. For the next three years they travelled through the Deccan, then up into the Himalayas, Karakoram, and Kunlun Mountains. Hermann and Robert were the first Europeans to cross the Kunlun.

Subsequently, Robert returned to Europe, and became a professor of geography at the University of Giessen in 1863. He made several trips to America between 1867 and 1870. Starting in Boston with the Lowell Institute with a series of twelve lectures on "Orography and Physical Geography of High Asia," he gave lectures throughout the United States. He also explored the Pacific coast. He wrote several books on American subjects, including Die Pacificeisenbahnen in Nordamerika (1870), Kalifornien (1871), Die Mormonen (1874), and Die Prärien des amerikanischen Westens (1876).

== Botanical collections ==
Botanical specimens collected by the Schlagintweit brothers are held at several herbaria around the world, including the Philadelphia Herbarium at the Academy of Natural Sciences (PH) and the National Herbarium of Victoria at the Royal Botanic Gardens Victoria. Numerous specimens were collected by their team; twenty-four specimens have been credited partially or fully to him.

In 1853, botanist Griseb. published Schlagintweitia, a genus of flowering plants from Europe, belonging to the family Asteraceae, with its name honouring Robert Schlagintweit and his brothers Hermann and Adolf.
