= Annapurna (mountain range) =

Mountain range in the Himalayas

Annapurna massif
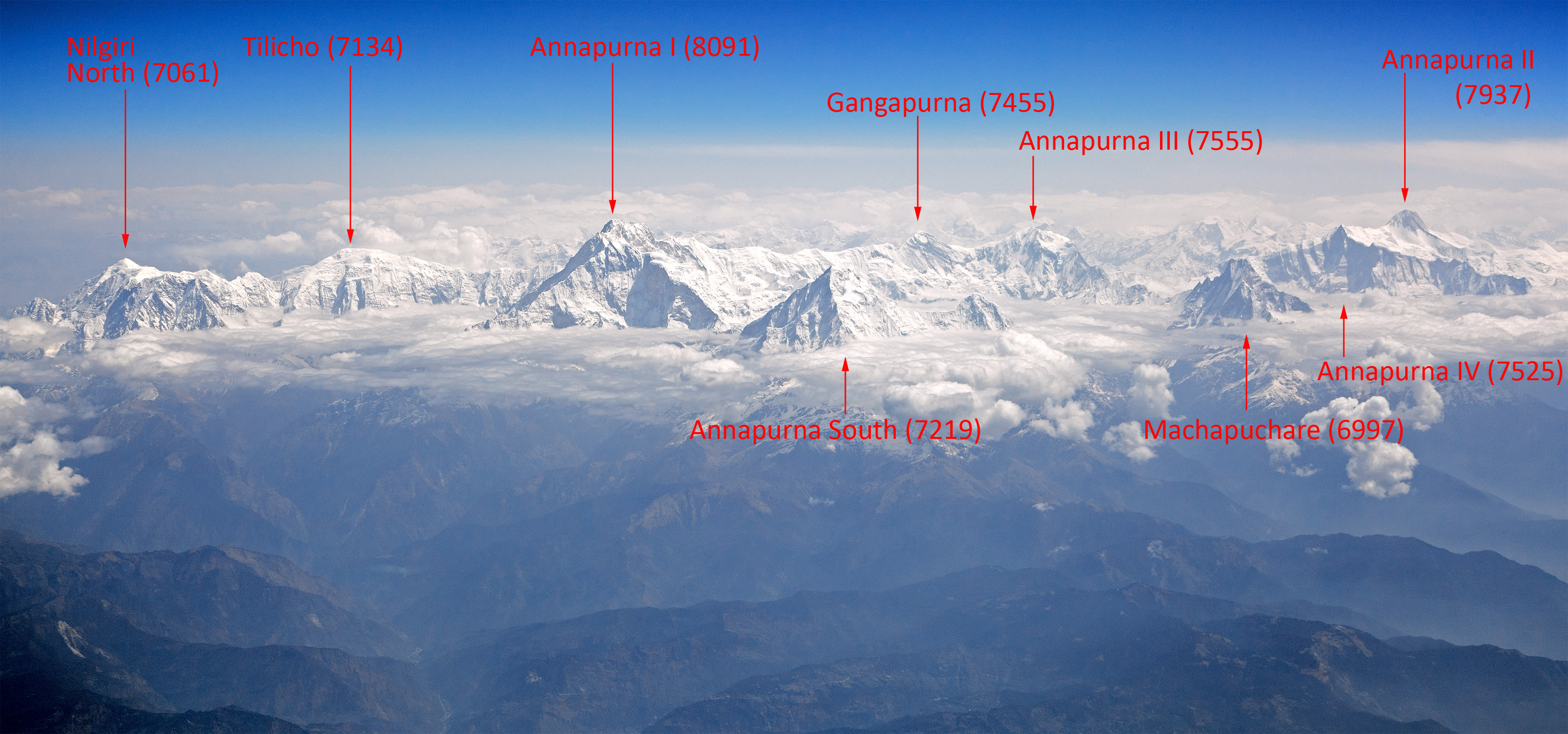
- The Annapurna massif, view from aircraft

Highest point
- Peak: Annapurna
- Elevation: 8,091 m (26,545 ft)
- Prominence: 2,984 m (9,790 ft)
- Isolation: 33.74 km (20.97 mi)

Dimensions
- Length: 55 km (34 mi)

Geography
- The major peaks (not mountains) above 7,500 m (24,600 ft) height in Himalayas, rank identified in Himalayas alone (not the world). Legend: 1：Mount Everest; 2：Kangchenjunga; 3：Lhotse; 4：Yalung Kang, Kanchenjunga West; 5：Makalu; 6：Kangchenjunga South; 7：Kangchenjunga Central; 8：Cho Oyu; 9：Dhaulagiri; 10：Manaslu (Kutang); 11：Nanga Parbat (Diamer); 12：Annapurna; 13：Shishapangma (Shishasbangma, Xixiabangma); 14：Manaslu East; 15：Annapurna East Peak; 16： Gyachung Kang; 17：Annapurna II; 18：Tenzing Peak (Ngojumba Kang, Ngozumpa Kang, Ngojumba Ri); 19：Kangbachen; 20：Himalchuli (Himal Chuli); 21：Ngadi Chuli (Peak 29, Dakura, Dakum, Dunapurna); 22：Nuptse (Nubtse); 23：Nanda Devi; 24：Chomo Lonzo (Chomolonzo, Chomolönzo, Chomo Lönzo, Jomolönzo, Lhamalangcho); 25：Namcha Barwa (Namchabarwa); 26：Zemu Kang (Zemu Gap Peak); 27：Kamet; 28：Dhaulagiri II; 29：Ngojumba Kang II; 30：Dhaulagiri III; 31：Kumbhakarna Mountain (Mount Kumbhakarna, Jannu); 32：Gurla Mandhata (Naimona'nyi, Namu Nan); 33：Hillary Peak (Ngojumba Kang III); 34：Molamenqing (Phola Gangchen); 35：Dhaulagiri IV; 36：Annapurna Fang; 37：Silver Crag; 38：Kangbachen Southwest; 39：Gangkhar Puensum (Gangkar Punsum); 40：Annapurna III; 41：Himalchuli West; 42：Annapurna IV; 43：Kula Kangri; 44：Liankang Kangri (Gangkhar Puensum North, Liangkang Kangri); 45：Ngadi Chuli South
- Range coordinates: 28°36′50″N 83°52′20″E

Annapurna (/ˌænəˈpʊərnəˌ -ˈpɜːr-/; Nepali: अन्नपूर्ण) is a massif in the Himalayas in north-central Nepal that includes one peak over 8,000 metres (26,247 ft), thirteen peaks over 7,000 metres (22,966 ft), and sixteen more over 6,000 metres (19,685 ft). The massif is 55 kilometres (34 mi) long, and is bounded by the Kali Gandaki Gorge on the west, the Marshyangdi River on the north and east, and by the Pokhara Valley on the south. At its western end, the massif encloses a high basin called the Annapurna Sanctuary. The highest peak of the massif, Annapurna I Main, is the 10th highest mountain in the world at 8,091 metres (26,545 ft) above sea level. Maurice Herzog led a French expedition to its summit through the north face in 1950, making it the first eight-thousander to be successfully climbed.

The name for the range comes from the Hindu deity Annapurna meaning the giver of food and nourishment due to the evergreen flowing rivers originating from this mountain range which generate greenery and support vegetation year round on the lower plains. She is also believed to be one of the daughters of Himavat, the king of the mountains.

The entire massif and surrounding area are protected within the 7,629-square-kilometre (2,946 mi^{2}) Annapurna Conservation Area, the first and largest conservation area in Nepal. The Annapurna Conservation Area is home to several world-class treks, including the Annapurna Sanctuary and Annapurna Circuit.

Historically, the Annapurna peaks have been among the world's most treacherous mountains to climb with the particular case of the extremely steep south face of Annapurna I Main – a wall of rock that rises 3,000 metres (9,800 feet) – making it one of the most difficult climbs in the world. By January 2022, there had been 365 summit ascents of Annapurna I Main, and 72 climbing fatalities for a fatality rate of just under 20 percent.

== Peaks ==
The Annapurna massif contains nine prominent peaks over 7,200 m (23,620 ft) elevation:

| Mountain | Elevation | Prominence (m) |
|---|---|---|
| Annapurna I (Main) | 8,091 m (26,545 ft) | 2984 |
| Annapurna I Central | 8,013 m (26,289 ft) | 49 |
| Annapurna I East | 7,980 m (26,181 ft) | 60 |
| Annapurna II | 7,937 m (26,040 ft) | 2437 |
| Annapurna Fang | 7,647 m (25,089 ft) | 445 |
| Annapurna III | 7,555 m (24,787 ft) | 703 |
| Annapurna IV | 7,525 m (24,688 ft) | 255 |
| Khangsar Kang | 7,485 m (24,557 ft) | 156 |
| Gangapurna | 7,455 m (24,459 ft) | 563 |
| Tarke Kang | 7,231 m (23,724 ft) | 168 |
| Annapurna South | 7,219 m (23,684 ft) | 775 |
| Asapurna | 7,140 m (23,425 ft) | 262 |
| Tilicho Peak | 7,135 m (23,409 ft) | 710 |
| Tare Kang | 7,069 m (23,192 ft) | 156 |
| Nilgiri Himal North | 7,061 m (23,166 ft) | 840 |
| Machapuchare | 6,993 m (22,943 ft) | 1233 |
| Nilgiri Himal Central | 6,940 m (22,769 ft) | |
| Nilgiri Himal South | 6,842 m (22,448 ft) | 544 |
| Hiunchuli | 6,441 m (21,132 ft) | 439 |
| Gandharba Chuli | 6,248 m (20,499 ft) | 461 |

== Climbing history ==
Gangapurna was first climbed on 6 May 1965, by a German expedition led by Günther Hauser, via the East Ridge. The summit party comprised 11 members of the expedition.

Annapurna South (also known as Annapurna Dakshin, or Moditse) was first climbed in 1964 by a Japanese expedition, via the North Ridge. The summit party comprised S. Uyeo and Mingma Tsering.

Hiunchuli (6,441 m/21,126 ft) is a satellite peak extending east from Annapurna South, Hiunchuli was first climbed in 1971 by an expedition led by U.S. Peace Corps Volunteer Craig Anderson.

Mount Machhapuchchhre (6,993 m or 22,943 ft), named after its resemblance to a fish-tail, is another important peak, though it just misses the 7,000 metre mark. Mount Machhapuchchhre and Hiunchuli are prominently visible from the valley of Pokhara. These peaks are the "gates" to the Annapurna Sanctuary leading to the south face of Annapurna I. Mount Machhapuchchhre was climbed in 1957 (except for the final 50 metres for its local religious sanctity) by Wilfrid Noyce and A. D. M. Cox. Since then it has been off limits.

== Trekking ==
The Annapurna Conservation Area (7,629 km^{2}) is a well known trekking region. There are three major trekking routes in the Annapurna region: the Jomson Trek to Jomsom and Muktinath (increasingly disturbed by a road-building project); the Annapurna Sanctuary route to Annapurna base camp; and the Annapurna Circuit, which circles the Annapurna Himal itself and includes the Jomsom route. The town of Pokhara usually serves as a starting point for these treks, and is also a good starting place for other short treks of one to four days, such as routes to Ghorepani or Ghandruk.

The Mustang district, a former kingdom bordering Tibet, is also geographically a part of the Annapurna region, but treks to upper Mustang are subject to special restrictions. Mustang is also increasingly becoming popular for mountain biking because of the construction of roads undertaken by the Nepali government in the region.

About two-thirds of all trekkers in Nepal visit the Annapurna region. The area is accessible, guest houses in the hills are numerous, and treks here offer diverse scenery, with both high mountains and lowland villages. Also, because the entire area is inhabited, trekking in the region offers cultural exposure for visitors. Trekkers are required to purchase a special permit for trekking from the Nepal Immigration Office, with the permit generally being valid for ten days.

== 2014 trekking disaster ==
In October 2014, at least 43 people were killed, and some 175 injured, as a result of snowstorms and avalanches on and around Annapurna, including trekkers from Nepal, Israel, Canada, India, Slovakia and Poland. Between 10 and 50 people were thought likely to be missing. It was believed that about 100 trekkers had left a guest house at 4,800 metres (15,700 ft), to climb to the top of Thorong La pass and then descend.

The authorities were criticized for not giving sufficient warning of the approaching bad weather. By 18 October, some 289 people were reported as having been rescued. An official from the Nepal Ministry of Tourism said on 18 October that helicopters were looking for survivors and bodies in snowy areas at up to 5,790 metres (19,000 ft), and were trying to reach 22 hikers stranded at Thorong La. The incident was said to be Nepal's worst-ever trekking disaster.

== See also ==
- Dhaulagiri (mountain range)
