= Gangapurna =

Mountain in Nepal

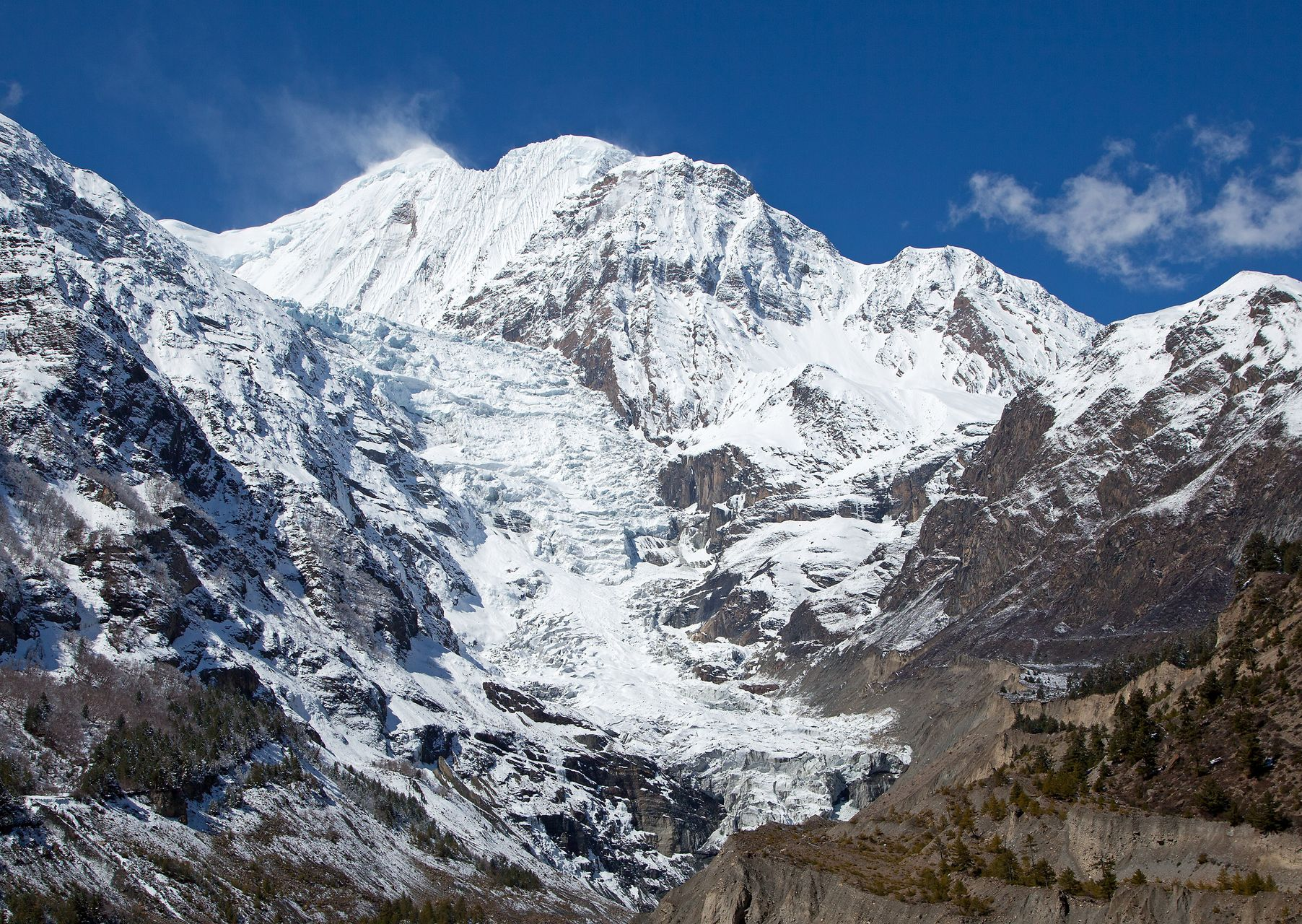
- Gangapurna in 2011, seen from the northeast

Highest point
- Elevation: 7,455 m (24,459 ft); Ranked 59th
- Prominence: 563 m (1,847 ft)
- Listing: Mountains of Nepal
- Coordinates: 28°36′18″N 83°57′48″E

Naming
- Native name: गंगापूर्ण (Nepali)

Geography
- Location within Gandaki Province Location within Nepal
- Country: Nepal
- Province: Gandaki Province
- District(s): Kaski and Manang
- Parent range: Annapurna

Climbing
- First ascent: 6 May 1965

Gangapurna (Nepali: गंगापूर्ण) is a mountain in Gandaki Province, Nepal. It is part of the Annapurna mountain range in north-central Nepal at an elevation of 7,455 metres (24,459 ft) and with the prominence of 563 metres (1,847 ft). It was first ascended in 1965 by a German expedition via its south face and east ridge. Gangapurna is entirely located in the Annapurna Conservation Area.

== Geography ==
Gangapurna is located at the border of Annapurna Rural Municipality, Kaski and Nesyang Rural Municipality, Manang in Gandaki Province at 7,455 metres (24,459 ft) above sea level and its prominence is 563 metres (1,847 ft). It is part of the Annapurna mountain range in north-central Nepal, and Gangapurna is on the main ridge that connects Annapurna I to Gangapurna and Annapurna III. The main peak of the mountain range, Annapurna I Main, is the tenth highest mountain in the world at 8,091 metres (26,545 ft) above sea level.

The mountain is named after Ganga, the Hindu goddess who is a personification of the river Ganges. Gangapurna entirely lies in the Annapurna Conservation Area, Nepal's largest protected area established in 1985, which also encompasses Annapurna Sanctuary and is known for several trekking routes including Annapurna Circuit. The glaciers of Gangapurna, Annapurna IV, Khangsar Kang, and Glacier Dom create Gangapurna Lake, and the glaciers of the mountain have been melting extensively due to climate change. The base camp is located at 4,800 metres (15,700 ft).

== Climbing history ==
On 6 May 1965, Gangapurna was first climbed by Erich Reismueller, Ang Temba Sherpa, and Phu Dorjee Sherpa during a German expedition via its south face and east ridge. A Japanese expedition managed a second ascent in 1971 before avalanches killed eight members over a two-day period, the single worst climbing disaster in the Annapurna Himal to date. Another Japanese party succeeded without major incident in 1974.

In 1981, Canadian James Blench and John Lauchlan climbed the mountain using the alpine style, which is considered to be a "remarkable achievement for the era". In 1988, Gudmundur Petursson led an Icelandic expedition via the mountain's east ridge; due to a three-day thunderstorm that added 50 cm of snow to the mountain every day and increased the risk of an avalanche, the expedition was abandoned after it reached an altitude of 5,500 metres (18,000 ft). In 1992, Timothy Brill led an American expedition to climb Gangapurna in winter from the south ridge; however, this attempt only reached 5,800 metres (19,000 ft). The same year, there were two unsuccessful expeditions led by Spanish mountaineer Francisco Jose Palacios. In 2017, three Korean climbers climbed Gangapurna using a newly discovered south face route, and won a "Special Mention" at the 2017 Piolet d'Or.

== Neighbouring peaks ==
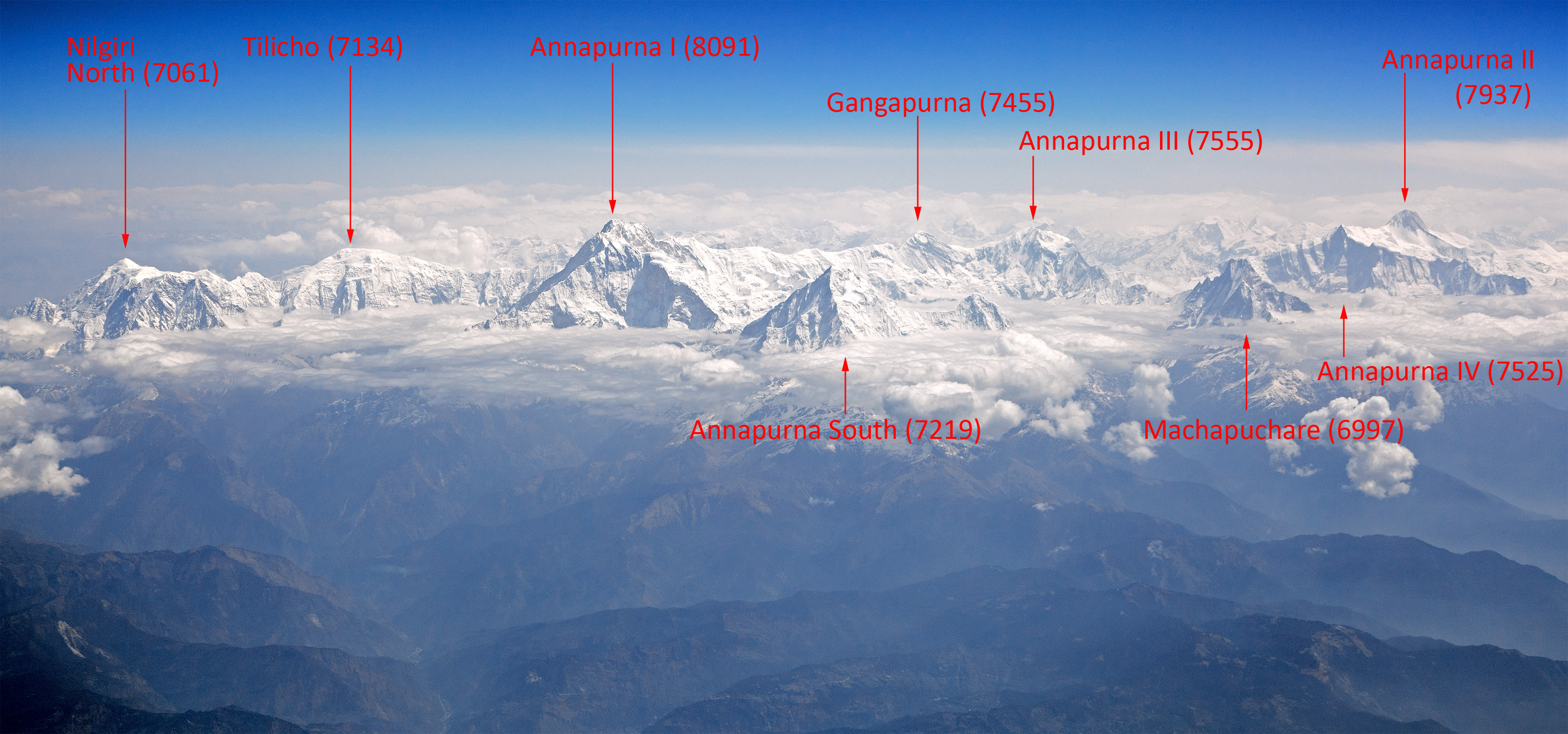
The Annapurna massif, view from aircraft
- Singu Chuli: 6,501 m (21,329 ft) 28°35′14″N 83°52′59″E
- Annapurna III: 7,555 m (24,787 ft) 28°35′8″N 83°59′22″E
- Annapurna IV: 7,525 m (24,688 ft) 28°32′15″N 84°4′58″E
