= Gandharwa Chuli =

Mountain in Nepal

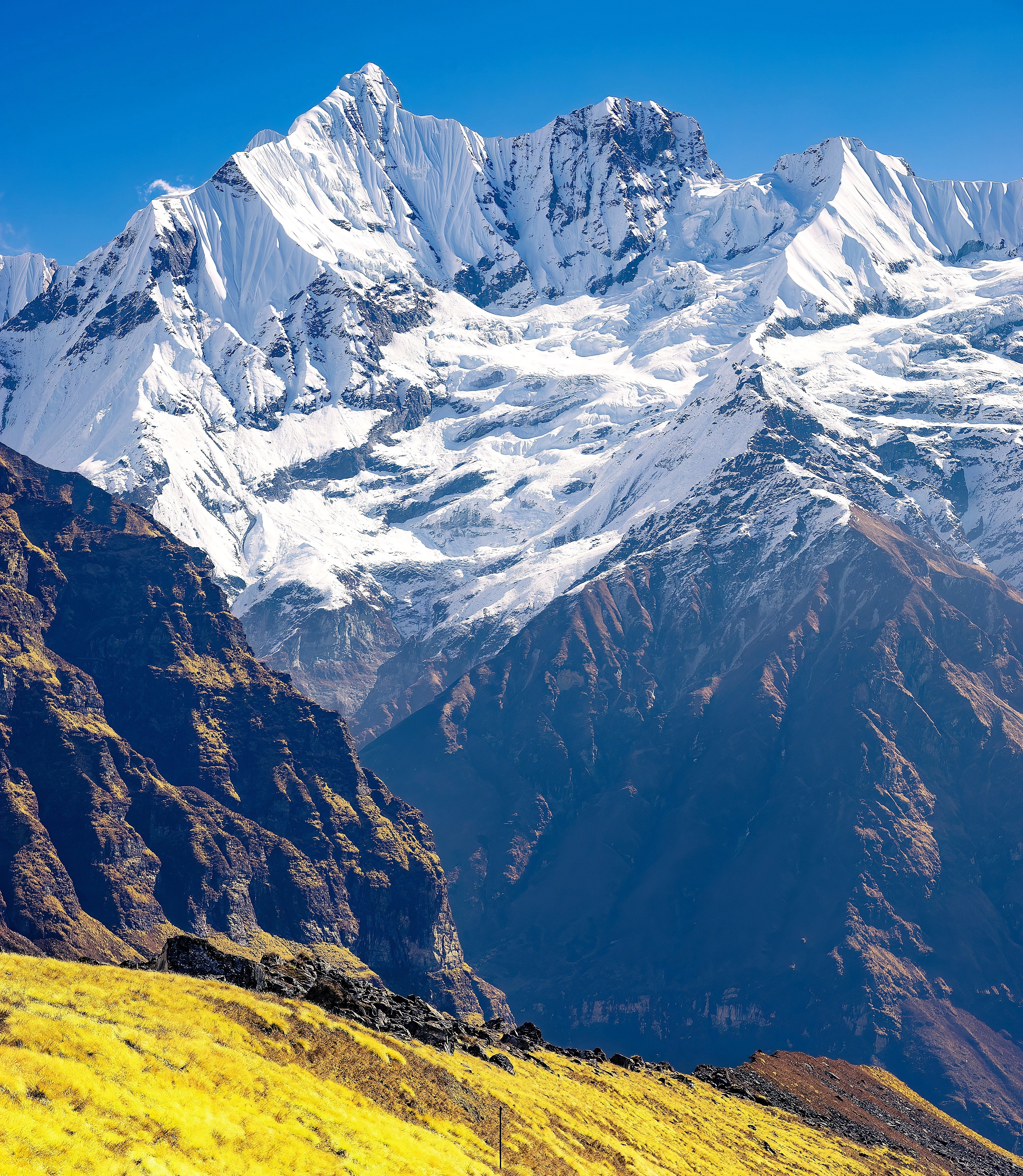
- West aspect

Highest point
- Elevation: 6,248 m (20,499 ft)
- Prominence: 256 m (840 ft)
- Isolation: 3.03 km (1.88 mi)
- Coordinates: 28°32′18″N 83°57′44″E

Geography
- Location within Nepal
- Interactive map of Gandharwa Chuli
- Country: Nepal
- Province: Gandaki
- District: Kaski
- Protected area: Annapurna Conservation Area
- Parent range: Himalayas; Annapurna Himal

Climbing
- First ascent: 2013

Gandharwa Chuli, also spelled as Gandharva Chuli or Gandharbha Chuli, is a mountain in Nepal.

== Description ==
Gandharwa Chuli is a 6,248-metre (20,499-foot) sacred summit in the Annapurna Himal of the Nepalese Himalayas. It is situated 32 kilometres (20 mi) north of Pokhara in Gandaki Province and the Annapurna Conservation Area. Precipitation runoff from the mountain's east slope drains into headwaters of the Seti Gandaki River, whereas the west slope drains into headwaters of the Modi River. Topographic relief is significant as the summit rises 2,250 metres (7,382 ft) above the Annapurna Sanctuary in three kilometres (1.9 mi). The first officially permitted ascent was made on May 6, 2013, by Cosmin Andron and Christina Pogacean.

== Climate ==
Based on the Köppen climate classification, Gandharwa Chuli is located in a tundra climate zone with cold, snowy winters, and cool summers. Weather systems are forced upwards by the Himalaya mountains (orographic lift), causing heavy precipitation in the form of rainfall and snowfall. Mid-June through early-August is the monsoon season. The months of March, April, October, and November offer the most favorable weather for viewing or climbing this peak.

== See also ==
- Geology of the Himalayas

== Gallery ==
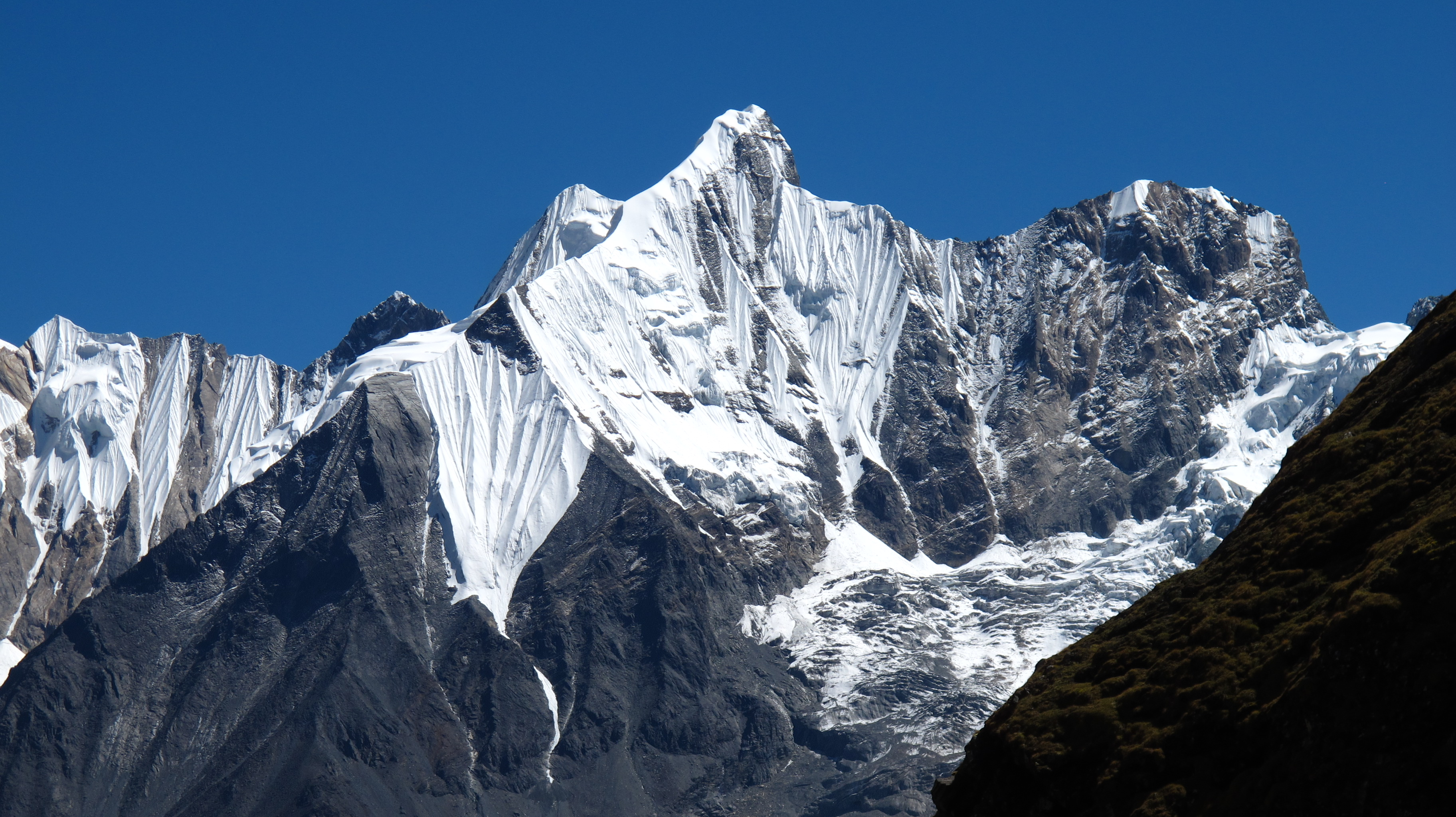
Gandharwa Chuli viewed from Annapurna Sanctuary

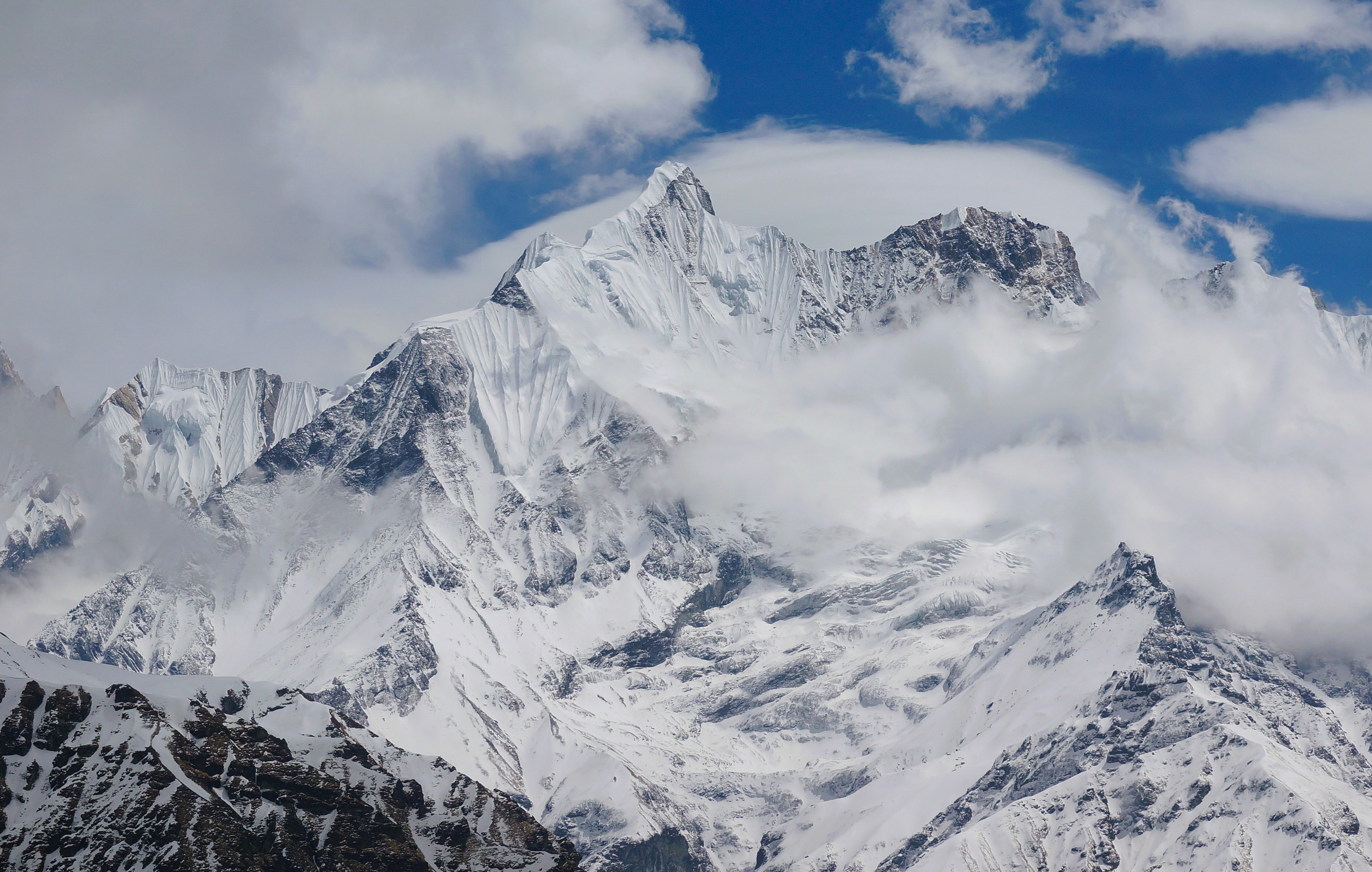
Gandharwa Chuli viewed from Annapurna Sanctuary

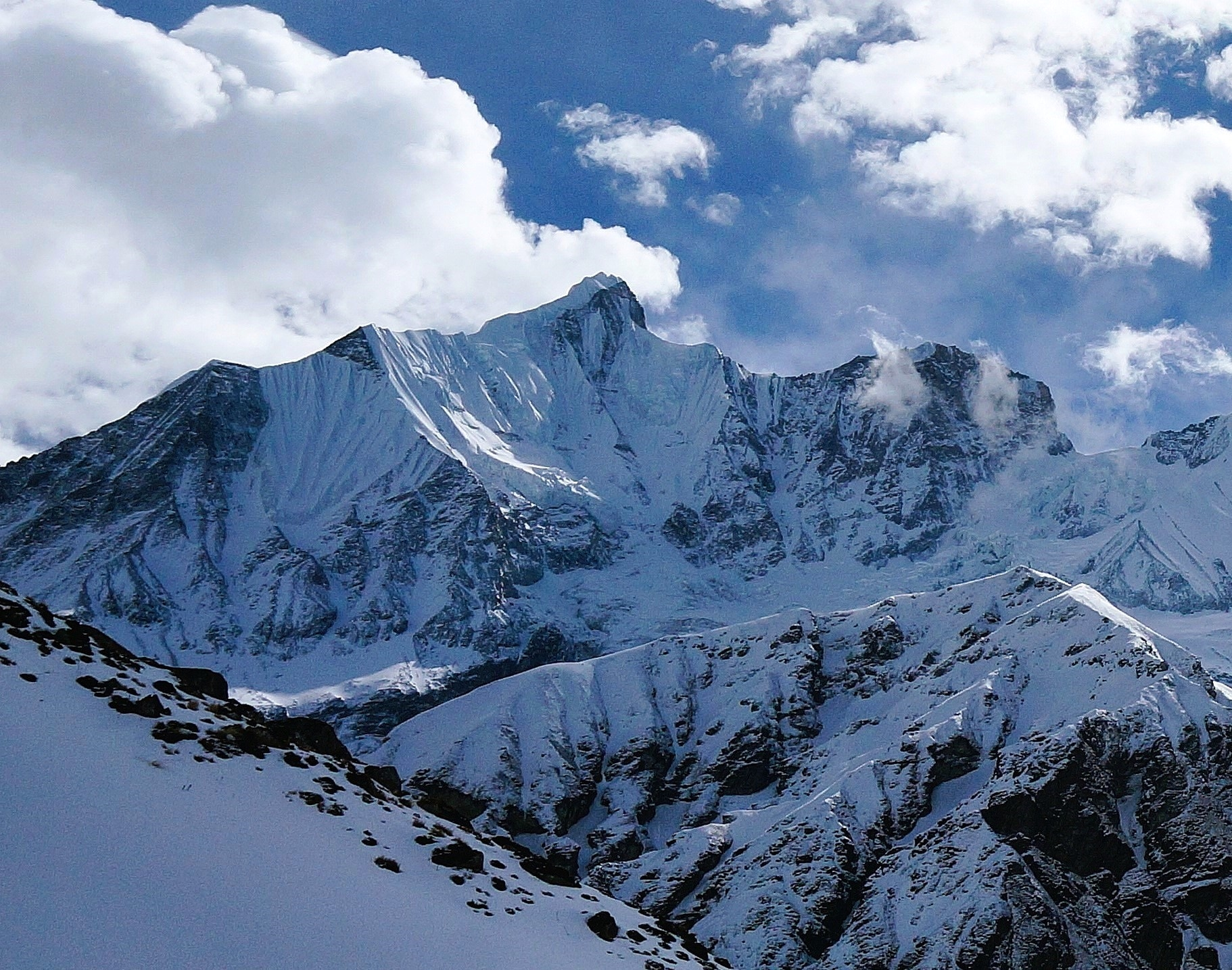
Gandharwa Chuli
