= Sunny Stroeer =

German-American endurance athlete

Sunny Stroeer is a German-American endurance athlete. She is known for completing long-distance expeditions and setting speed records, including becoming the first woman to finish the 1,000-mile Iditarod Trail Invitational on skis in 2024. Stroeer has established fastest known times on the Annapurna Circuit in Nepal and the Grand Canyon Rim-to-Rim-to-Rim Alt route. In 2018 she became the first woman to solo the 360 Route on Aconcagua in a single push.

== Early life and education ==
Stroeer was born in Germany. She attended Harvard Business School, and worked as a consultant in Houston after her graduation.

== Athletic career ==
=== Mountaineering ===
In February 2018 Stroeer soloed the 360 Route on Aconcagua, the highest peak in South America. She became the first woman and third person overall to complete the 104-kilometer route solo in a single push.

In 2017 Stroeer set a women’s fastest known time on the Annapurna Circuit in Nepal.

=== Trail running ===
Stroeer has established several notable times in the Grand Canyon. In 2018, along with Lexi Miller and Christin Douglas, she set a female team fastest known time on the Rim-to-Rim-to-Rim Alt route.

=== Iditarod Trail Invitational ===
In March 2024 Stroeer became the first woman to complete the Iditarod Trail Invitational 1000 on skis, finishing the 1,000-mile Alaskan route from Anchorage to Nome.

== See also ==
- List of female explorers and adventurers
- Fastest Known Time (FKT)
