= Hiunchuli =

Mountain in Nepal

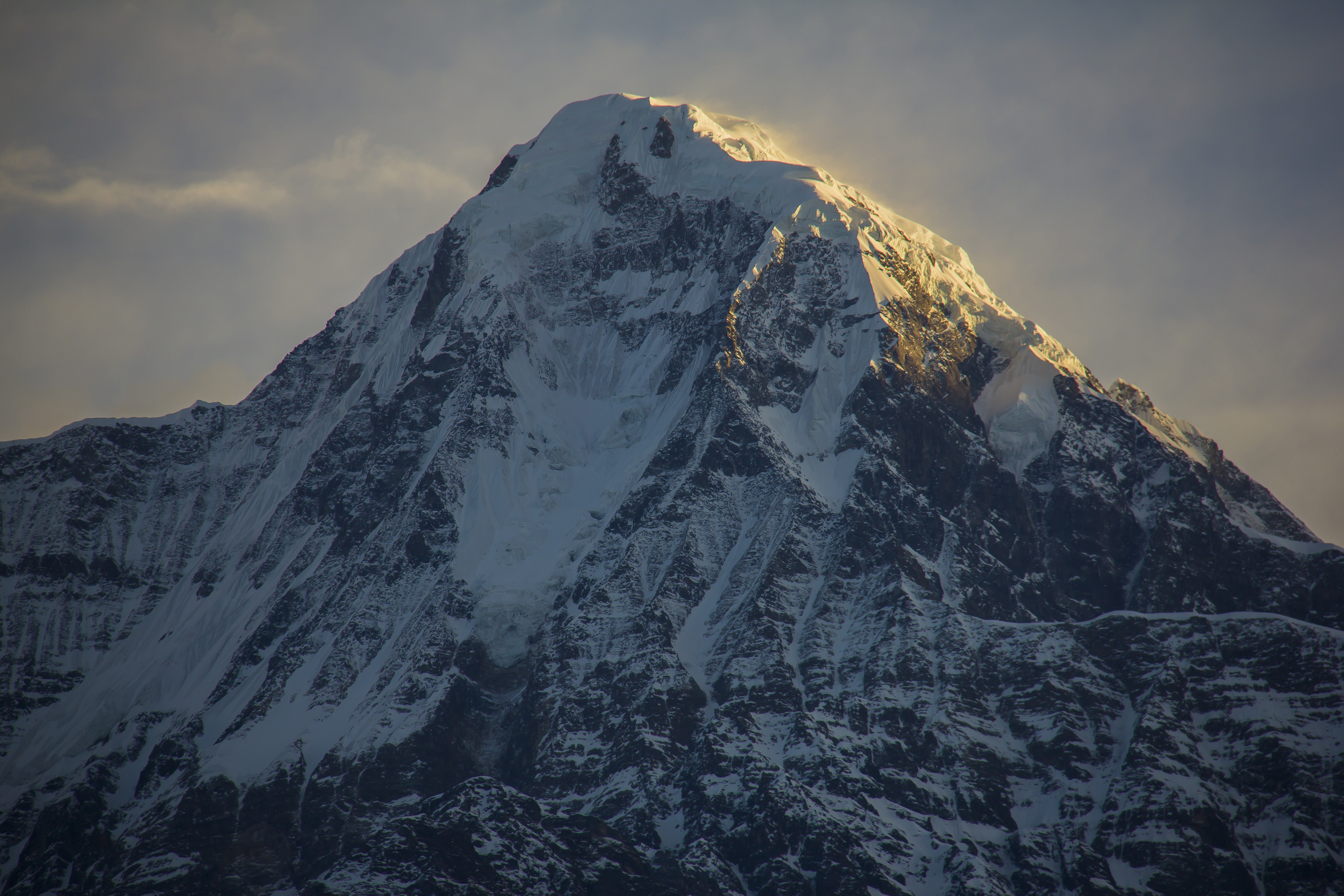
- Hiunchuli close up

Highest point
- Elevation: 6,441 m (21,132 ft)
- Prominence: 597 m (1,959 ft)
- Listing: Mountains of Nepal
- Coordinates: 28°30′37″N 83°51′07″E

Geography
- Location within Nepal
- Country: Nepal
- Province: Gandaki
- Parent range: Himalayas

Climbing
- First ascent: October 1971 by an American Expedition
- Easiest route: snow/rock climb

Hiunchuli (Nepali: हिउँचुली) is a peak situated in the Annapurna massif of the Gandaki Province in north-central Nepal. The mountain is an extension of the Annapurna South. Between this peak and the Machapuchare is a narrow section of the Modi Khola valley that constitutes the sole access to the Annapurna Sanctuary.

Hiunchuli was first climbed in October 1971 by an expedition led by the U.S. Peace Corps volunteer Craig Anderson. The mountain is classified as a trekking peak by the Nepal Mountaineering Association (NMA), but it is considered one of the more difficult trekking peaks to climb due to route finding difficulties and dangers from rock fall and seracs. A climbing permit from the NMA costs US$70-250 per foreign climber depending on the season.

== Gallery ==
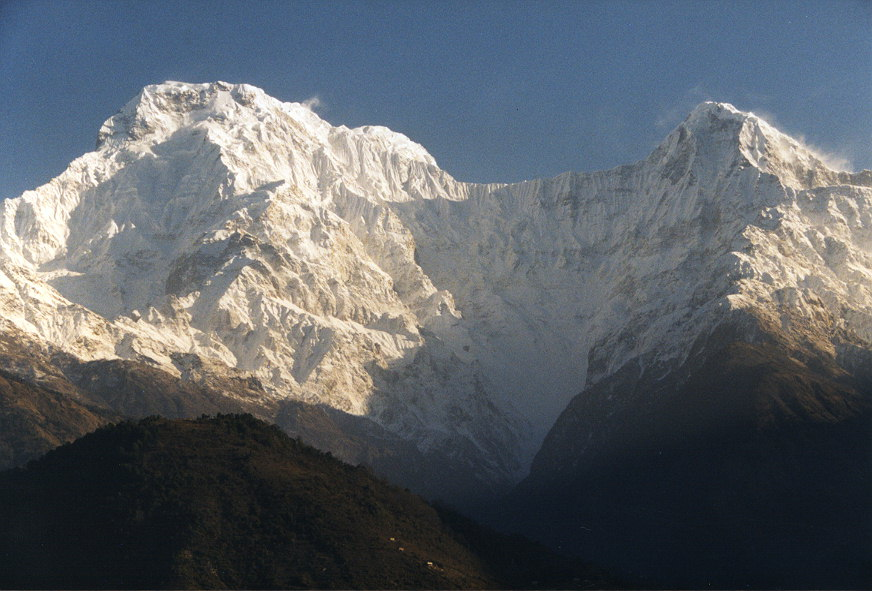
A view of Annapurna South and Hiunchuli

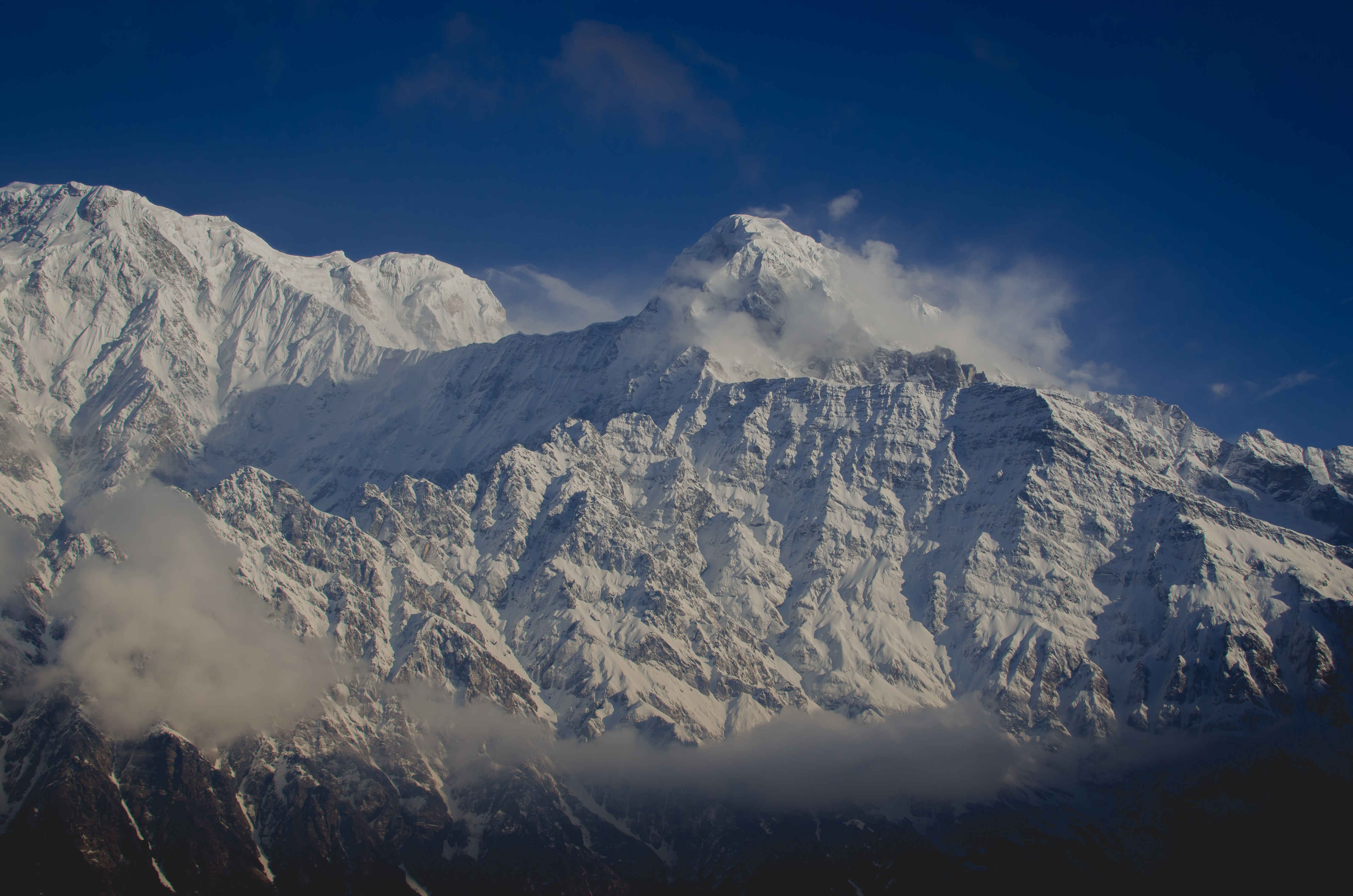
A view of Annapurna South and Hiunchuli from Mardi high camp

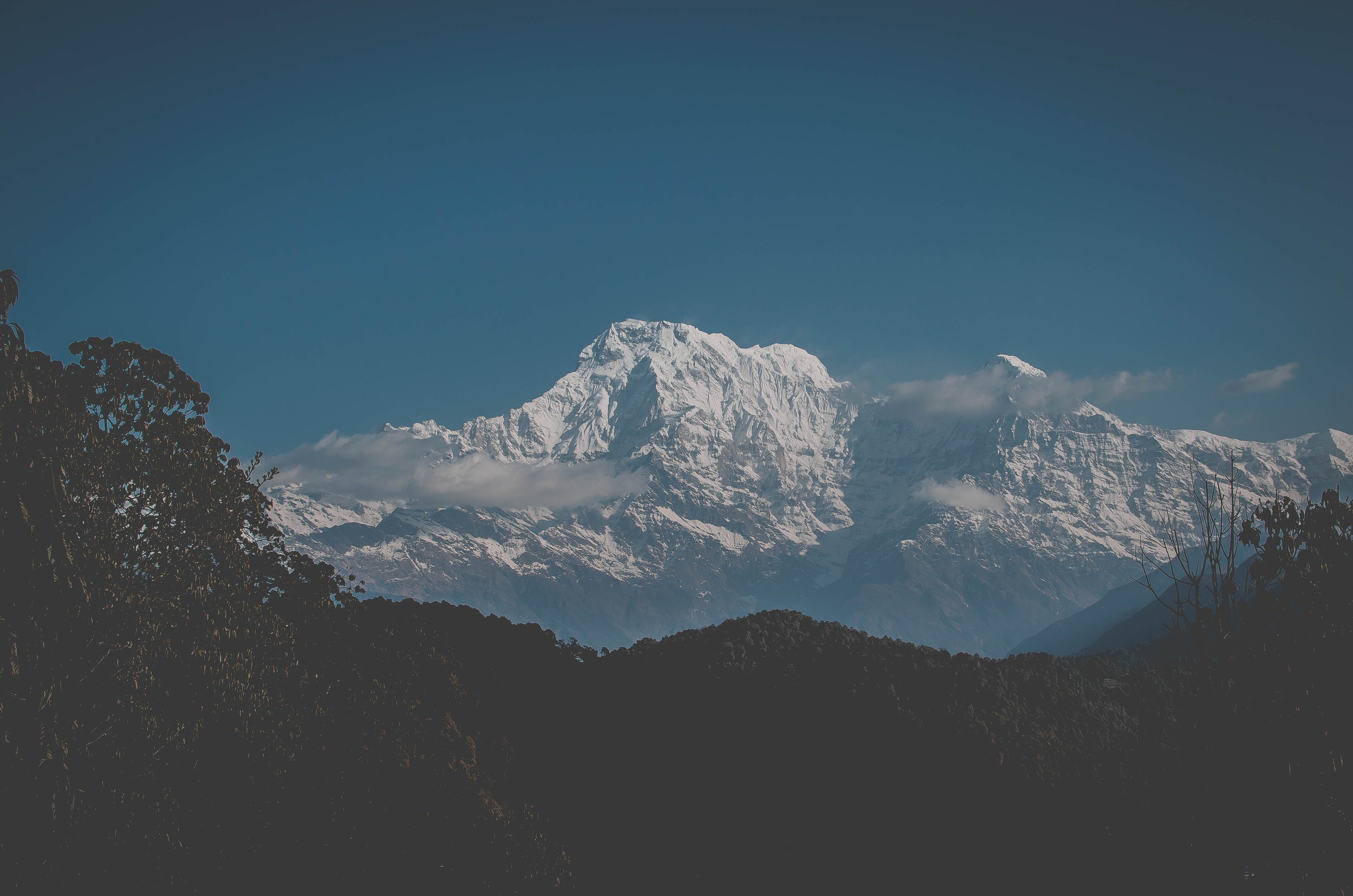
A view of Annapurna South and Hiunchuli from Australian base camp

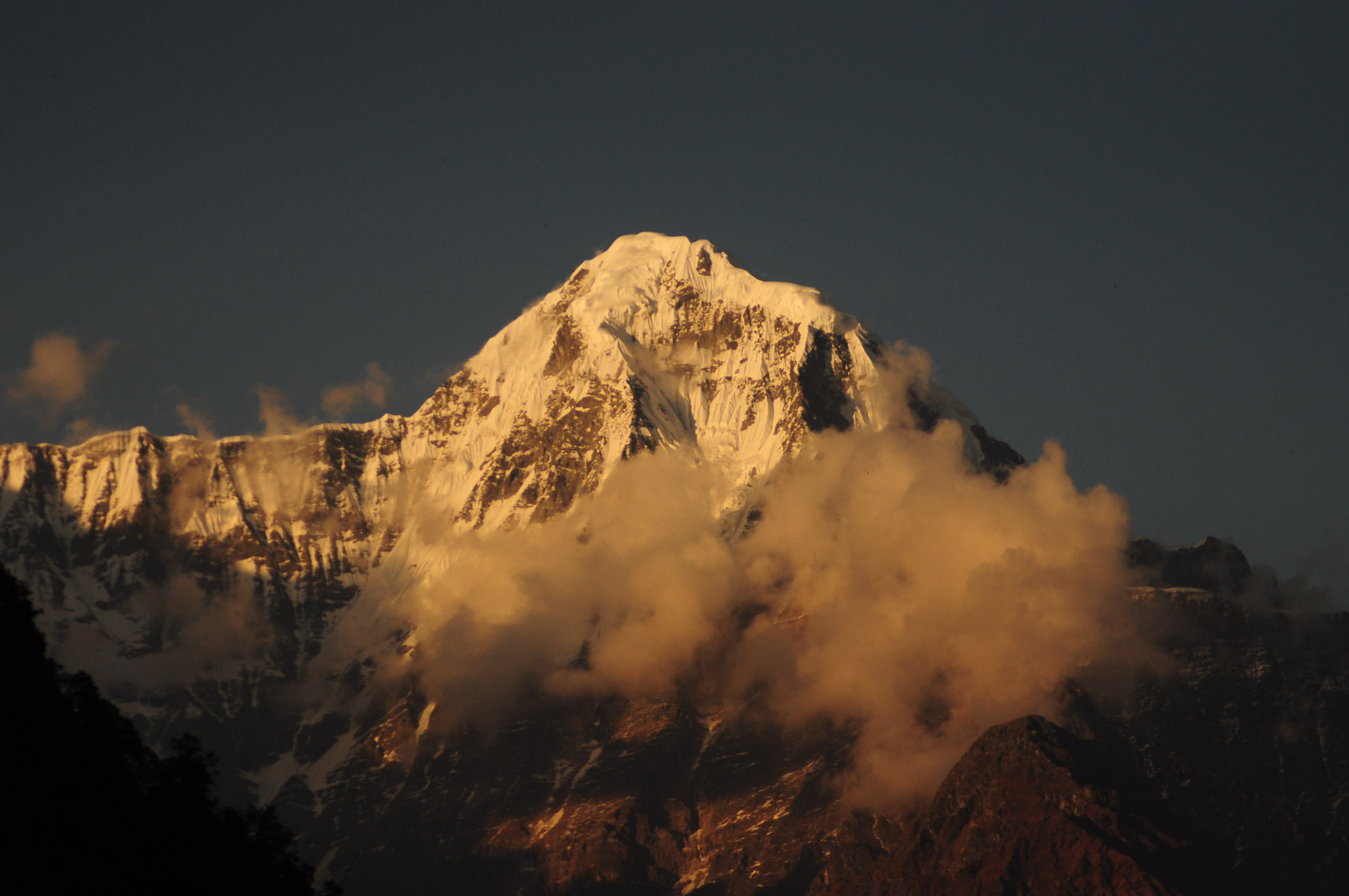
South face of Hiunchuli
