= Gangapurna Lake =

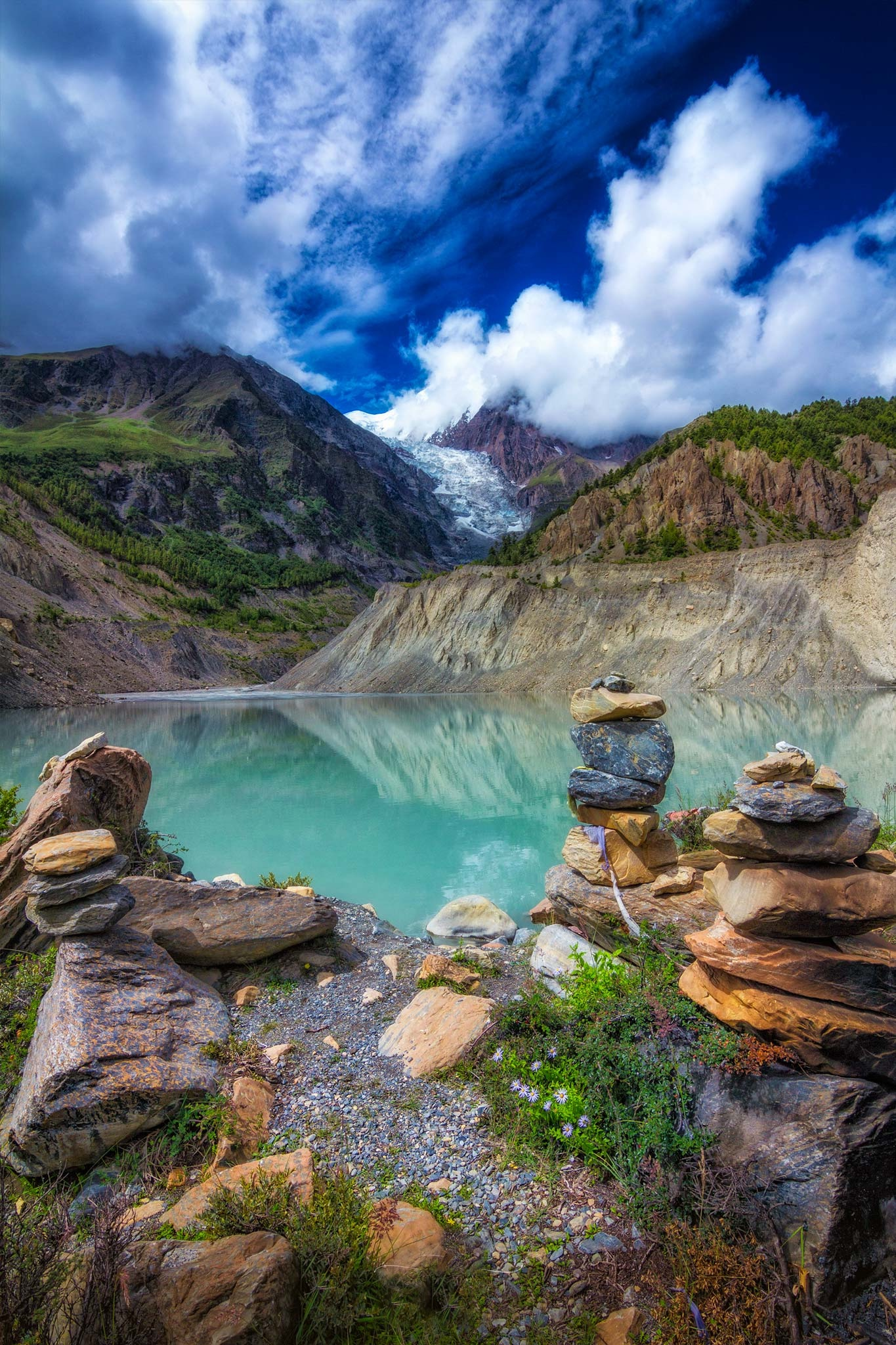
- Gangapurna Lake in 2015

- Location within Gandaki Province Location within Nepal
- Interactive map of Gangapurna Lake
- Location: Manang, Manang District, Nepal
- Coordinates: 28°39′50″N 84°01′03″E
- Type: Lake
- Surface area: 21.08 ha (52.1 acres)

Gangapurna Lake is a glacial lake in Manang, Gandaki Province, Nepal. It was formed by glaciers from Gangapurna (7,454m) and Annapurna III (7,555m).
