= Bill Denz =

New Zealand mountain climber (1951 to 1983)

- Born: Matthew William Denz; 27 December 1951; Surrey, England
- Died: 3 October 1983 (aged 31); Makalu, Nepal
- Cause of death: Falling, due to an avalanche
- Known for: Free solo climbing; Reputedly climbing the Machapuchare illegally in 1983

Bill Denz, formally Matthew William Denz, (27 December 1951 – 3 October 1983) was a mountain climber from New Zealand, famous for his free solo climbing and reputed climbing of the Machapuchare illegally in 1983.

== Early life ==
Denz was born on 27 September 1951 in Surrey, England. However, at the age of 2, his family decided to move to New Zealand in 1953, which led to him growing up in Dunedin, where he began his climbing journey. He reached his first successes when climbing the area around Mount Cook in 1970.

== Mountain climbing ==
Denz had become somewhat famous due to his effective ways of climbing the harsh routes in the Southern Alps, Darran Mountains and Patagonia. He was described as a free solo climber, who loved mountains that hadn't been climbed, would refuse to choose easy routes, and who would ice climb in harsh areas.

One of his friends, Philipp Herron, died when climbing the Cerro Torre with him. Due to his friend's death and the extremely harsh environment, Denz would only manage to climb the finale rime mushroom twice, instead of the summit.

According to unconfirmed sources, Denz reputedly climbed the Machapuchare in Nepal illegally in either 1973 or 1983. Due to his death in 1983, it is still uncertain whether the story is true. He had also tried illegally climbing the Melungtse in Tibet.

In 1981, Denz became the first person ever to climb the Kusum Kanguru in Nepal.

== Death ==
Bill Denz died on 3 October 1983 due to an avalanche, when climbing Makalu with his friends Peter Hillary, Mark Moorhead and Fred From. Moorhead and From had reached a height of 7,600 metres (24,900 ft), but Moorhead died on 15 October, when he fell while getting back down.

== Literature ==
- Paul Maxim, Bold beyond belief. Bill Denz. New Zealand´s Mountain Warrior. Wellington 2011.
