= Annapurna Circuit =

Mountain trail in central Nepal

Annapurna Circuit Trek
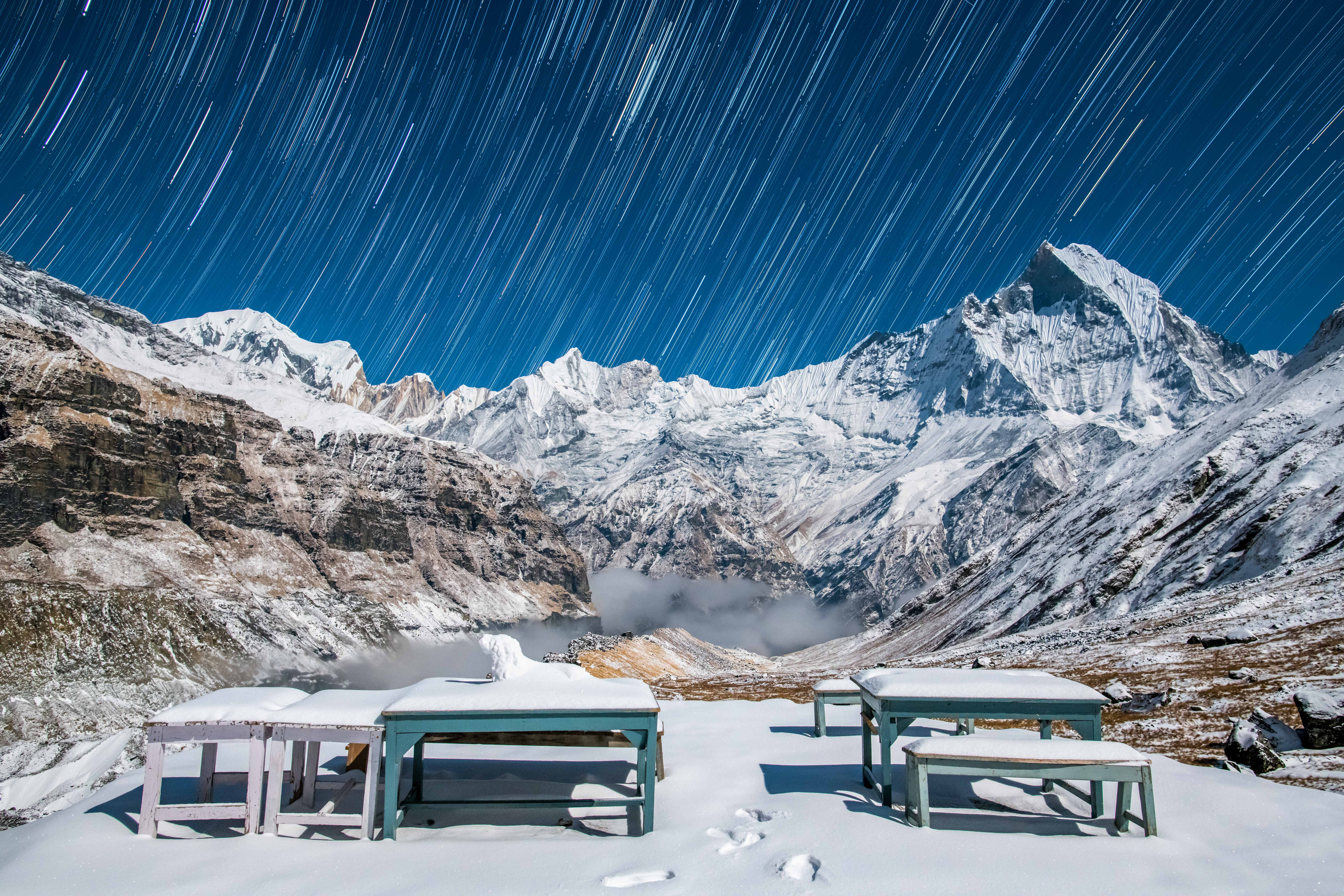
- View of Mount Machapuchare from Annapurna base camp near Fishtail Base Camp
- Length: 131 kilometres (81 miles)
- Location: Nepal
- Use: Hiking
- Elevation gain/loss: 4,107 m (13,474 ft)
- Difficulty: Difficult

The Annapurna Circuit is a trek within the mountain ranges of central Nepal. The total length of the route varies between 160 and 230 km (100-145 mi), depending on where motor transportation is used and where the trek is ended. This trek crosses two different river valleys and encircles the Annapurna Massif. The path reaches its highest point at Thorung La pass (5416 m/17,769 ft), reaching the edge of the Tibetan Plateau. Most trekkers hike the route anticlockwise, as this way the daily altitude gain is slower, and crossing the high Thorong La pass is easier and safer.

The mountain scenery, seen at close quarters includes the Annapurna Massif (Annapurna I-IV), Dhaulagiri, Machhapuchhre, Manaslu, Gangapurna, Tilicho Peak, Pisang Peak, and Paungda Danda. Numerous other peaks of 6000-8000 m in elevation rise from the Annapurna range.

The trek begins at Besisahar or Bhulbhule in the Marshyangdi river valley and concludes in the Kali Gandaki Gorge. Besisahar can be reached after a seven-hour drive from Kathmandu. The trail passes along paddy fields and into subtropical forests, past several waterfalls and gigantic cliffs, and through various villages.

Annapurna Circuit has been voted the best long-distance trek in the world, due to the wide variety of climate zones, from the tropics at 600 m above sea level, to arctic at 5416 m at the Thorong La pass, and cultural variety from Hindu villages at the low foothills to the Tibetan culture of Manang Valley and lower Mustang.

Continuing construction of a road has shortened the trail and changed the villages. The Beisahar-Manang jeep road now passes through the trekking trail much of the time. With the construction of roads, mountain biking is becoming popular, with Mustang in particular.

== Standard trek ==
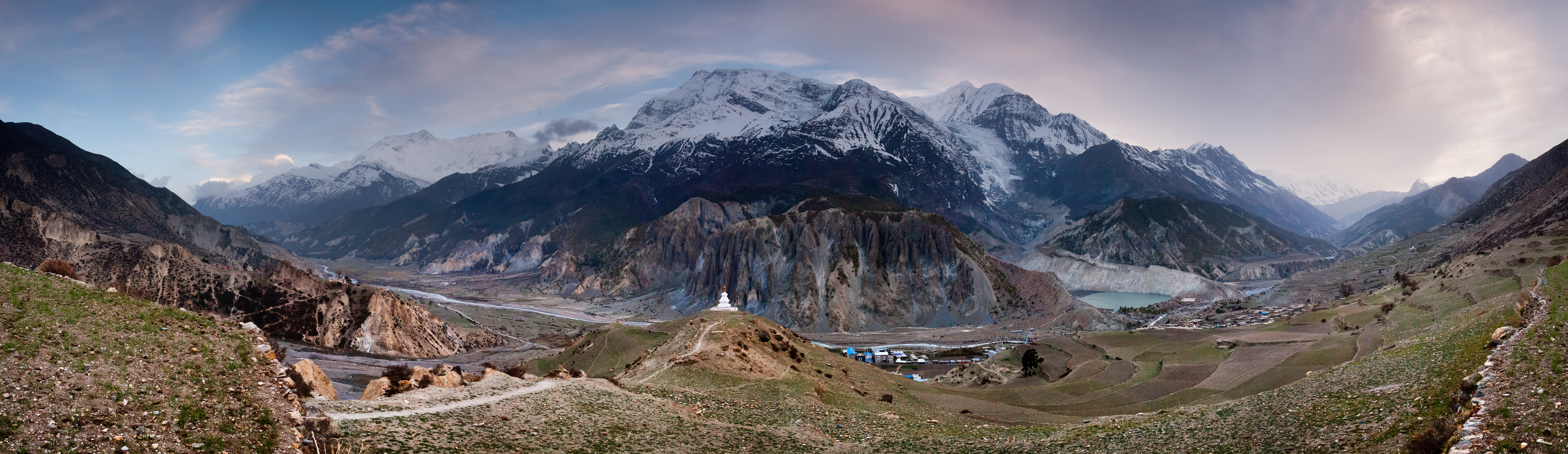
View of Annapurna massif and village of Manang and Gangapurna Lake, Nepal.

The trek usually takes about 15–20 days, leaving from Kathmandu with a stopover in Pokhara before returning to the capital. The trail is moderate to fairly challenging and makes numerous river crossings over steel and wooden suspension bridges.

It is also possible to continue from Ghorepani to Tadapani, Ghandruk, Landruk, and then to Phedi, which follows the old Annapurna Circuit from the time when the road was not yet extended to Beni. The circuit can also be extended to visit Annapurna Base Camp (also called Annapurna Sanctuary). This trail turns to the north from Tadapani and rejoins the old circuit at either Ghandruk or Landruk.

== Natural Annapurna Trekking Trails (NATT) ==
In recent years, up to 75% of the original Annapurna Circuit route has been impacted by the construction of new roads linking the region's villages. In response, Nepalese trekking guide Prem Rai has led the creation of the Natural Annapurna Trekking Trails (NATT), consisting of various side routes that avoid much of the new roads. The NATT trails are way-marked blue and red, as opposed to the red and white of the original trail.

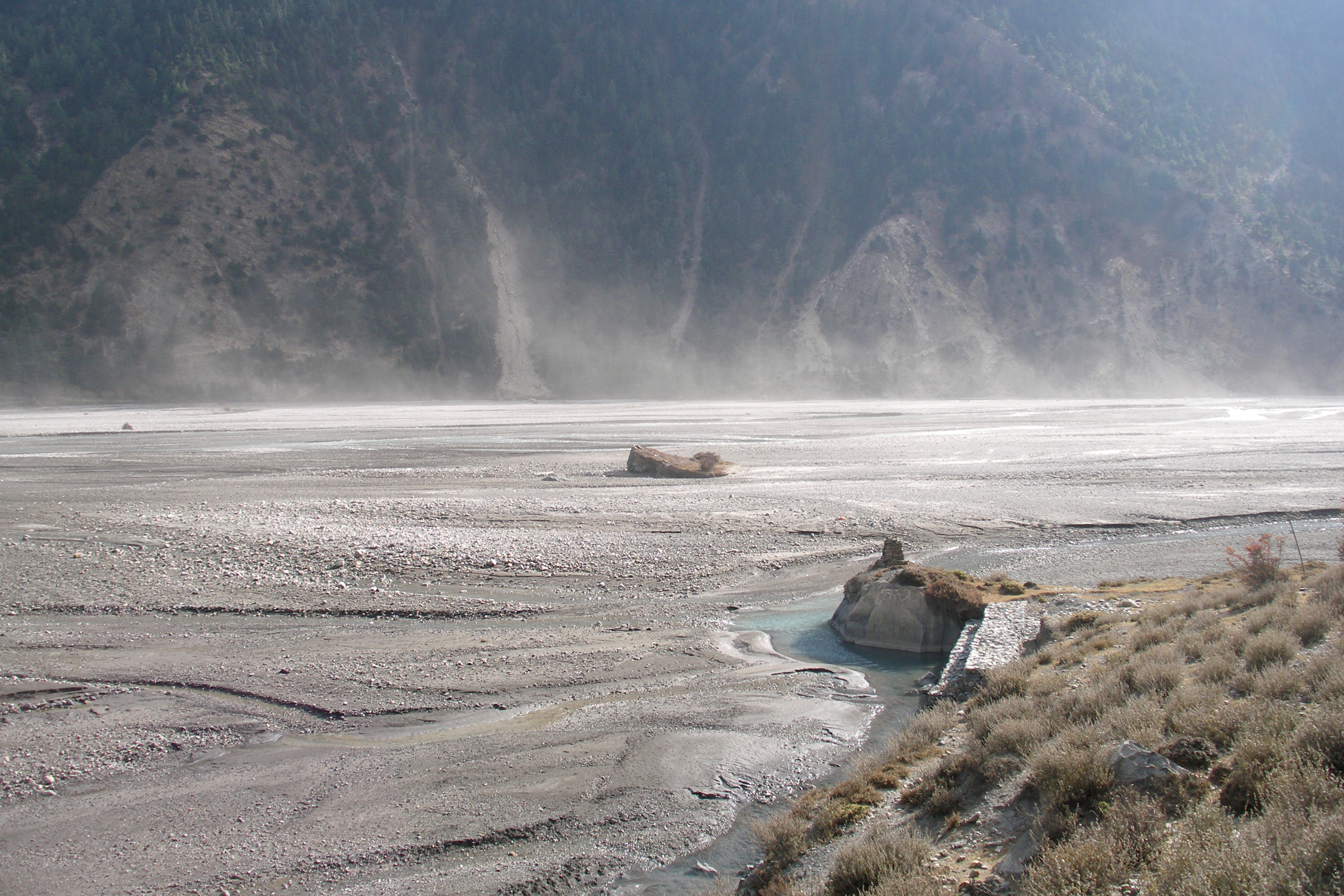
Kali Gandaki Valley

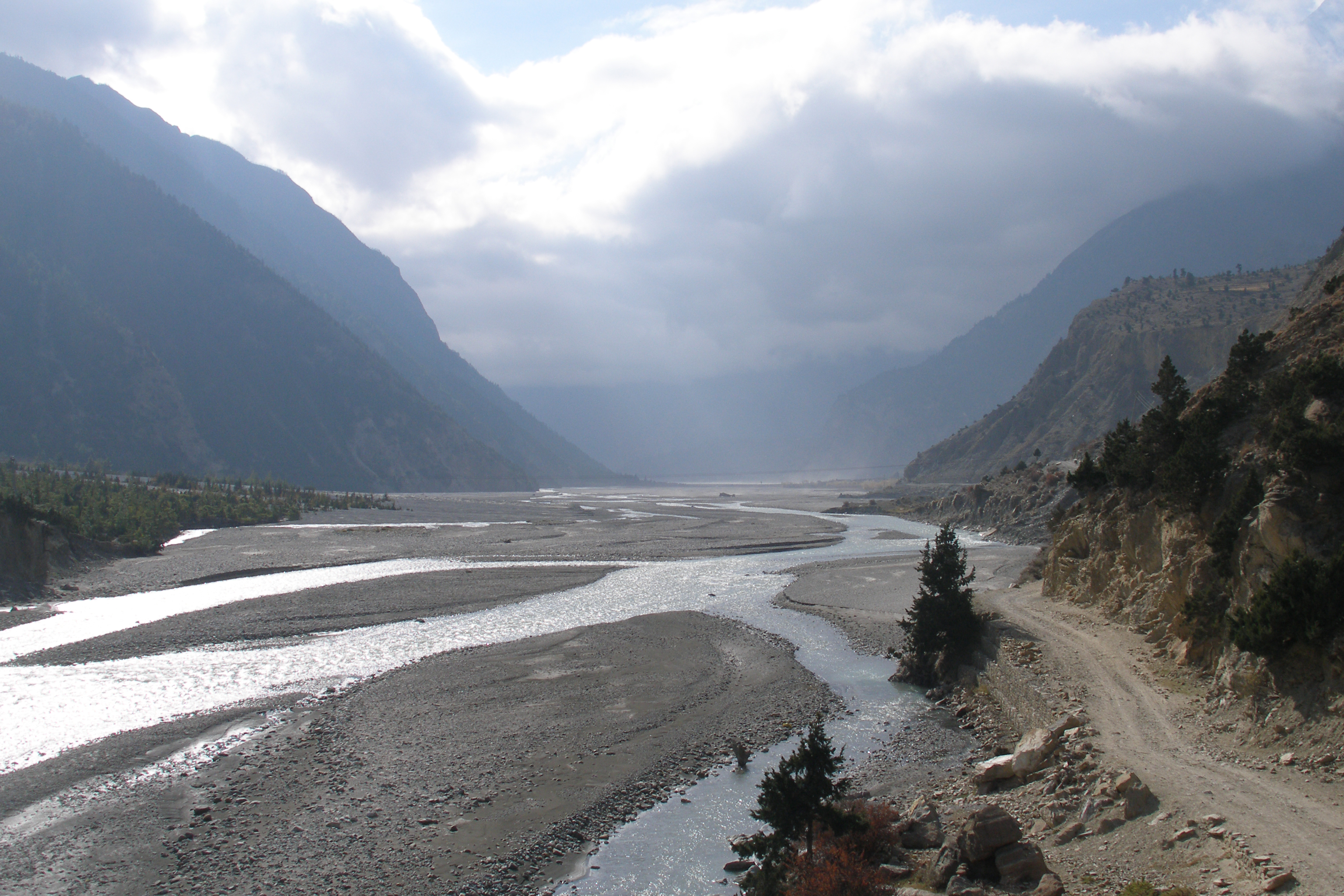
Kali Gandaki Valley near Tukuche

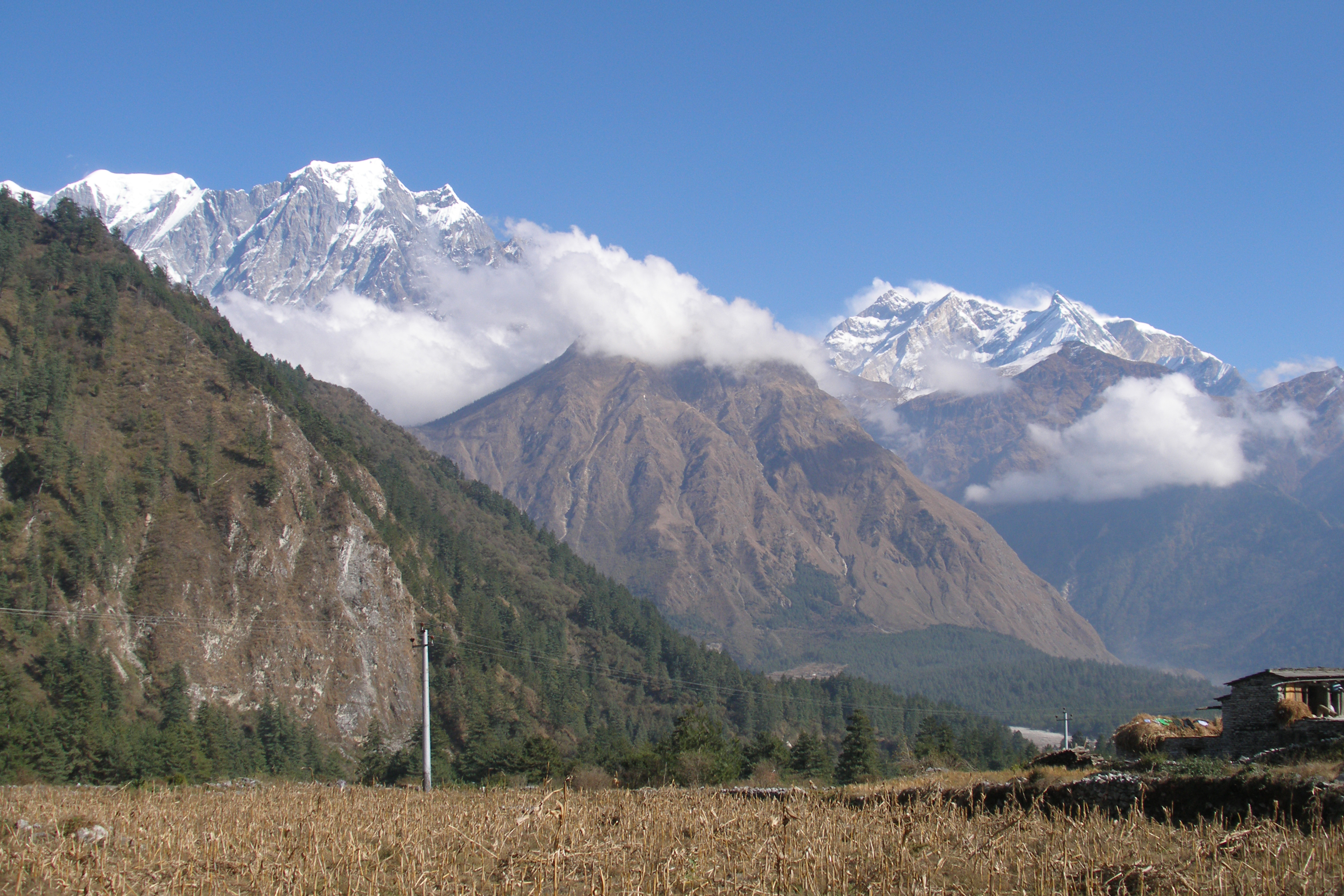
Annapurna and Nilgiri massifs

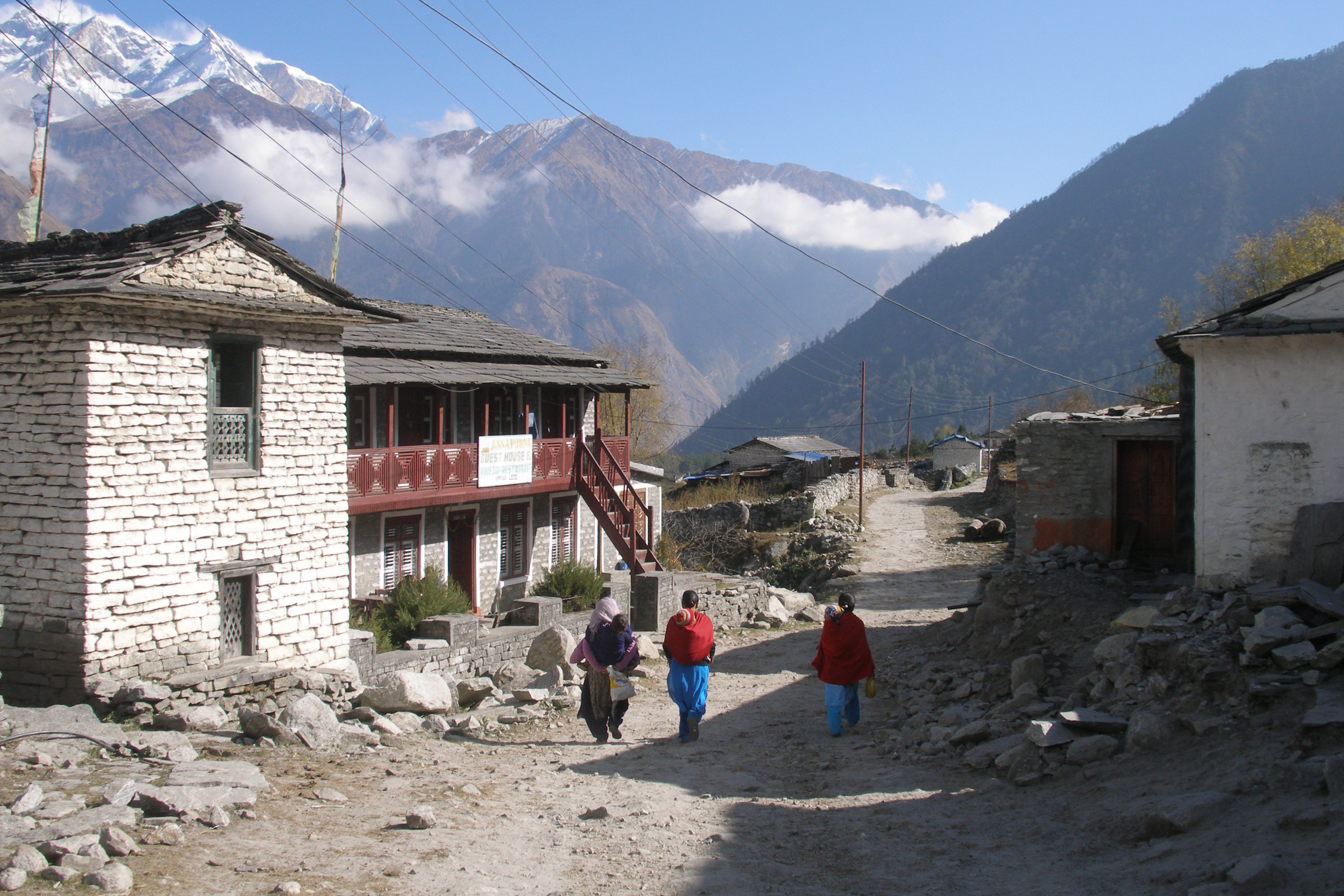
Lete village

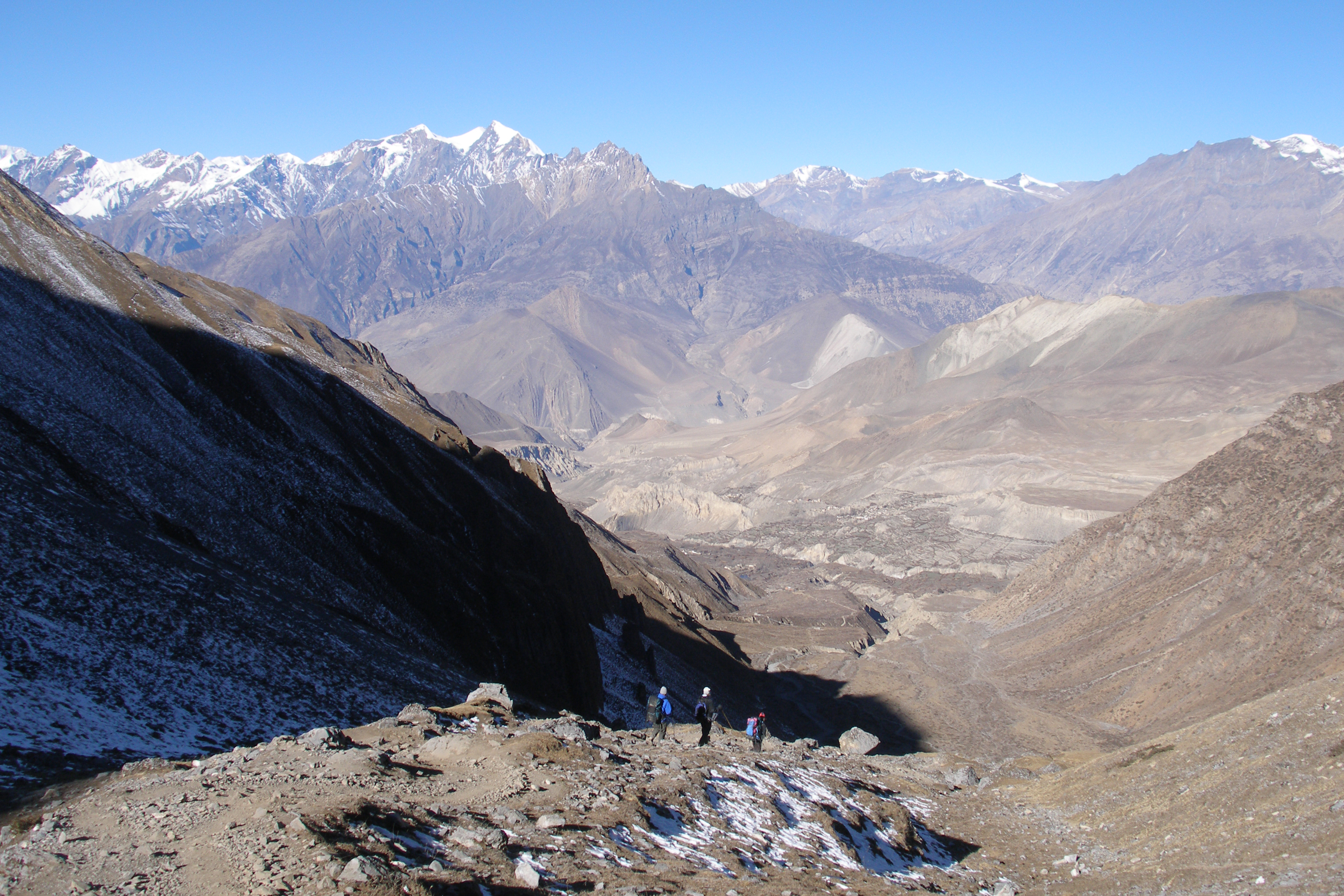
Muktinath Valley

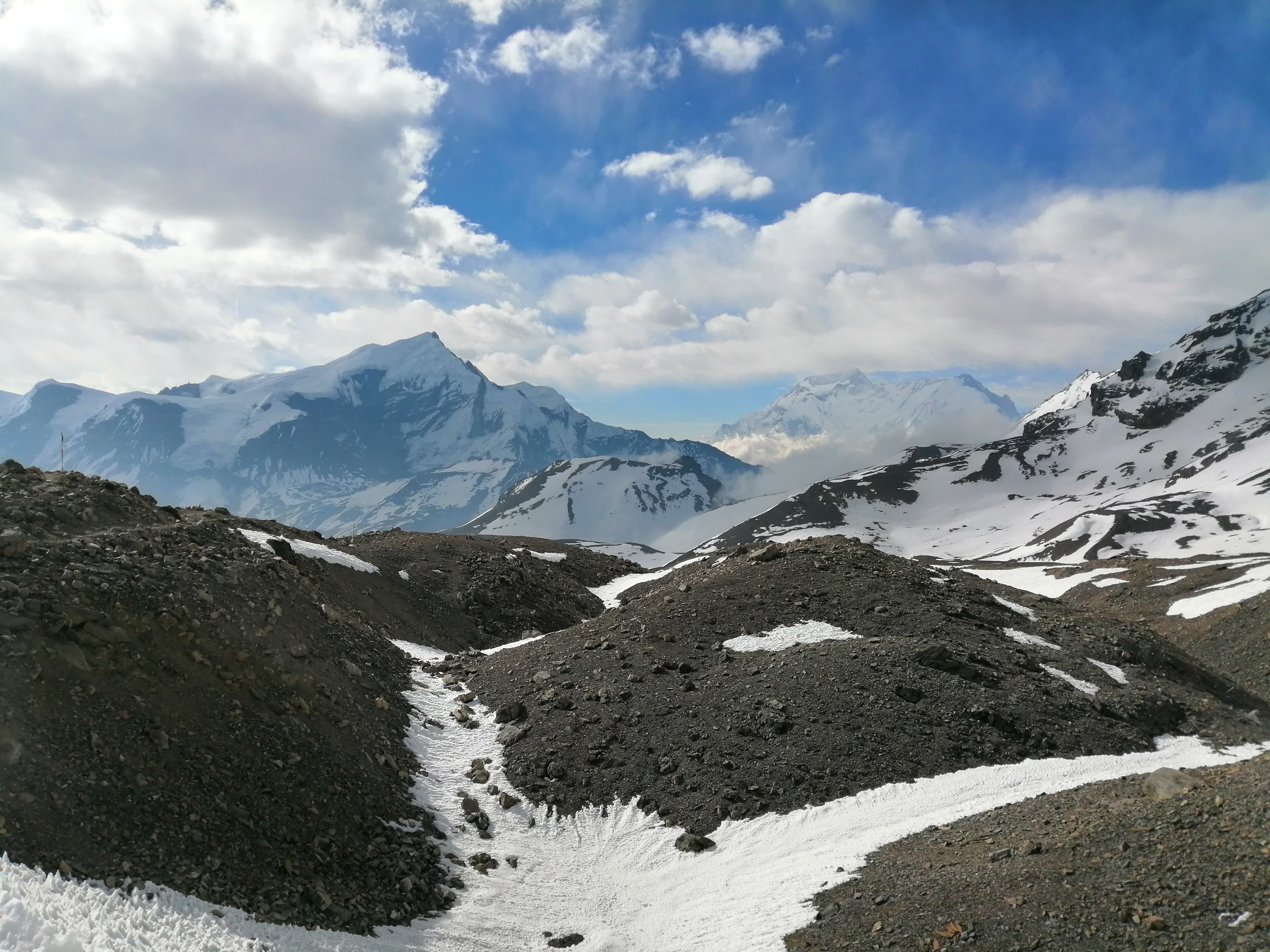
On the way to Thorong La Pass

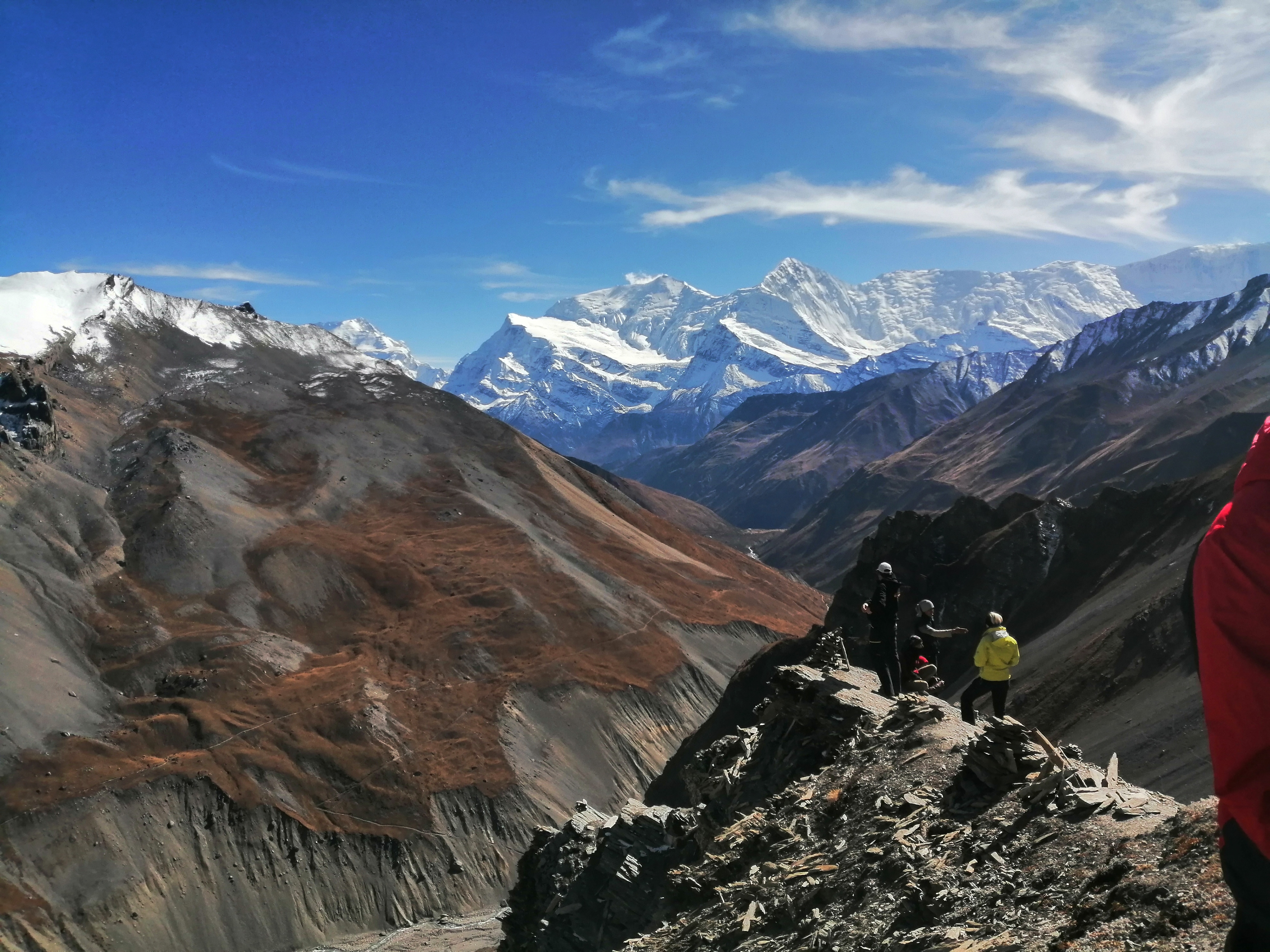
View from High Camp

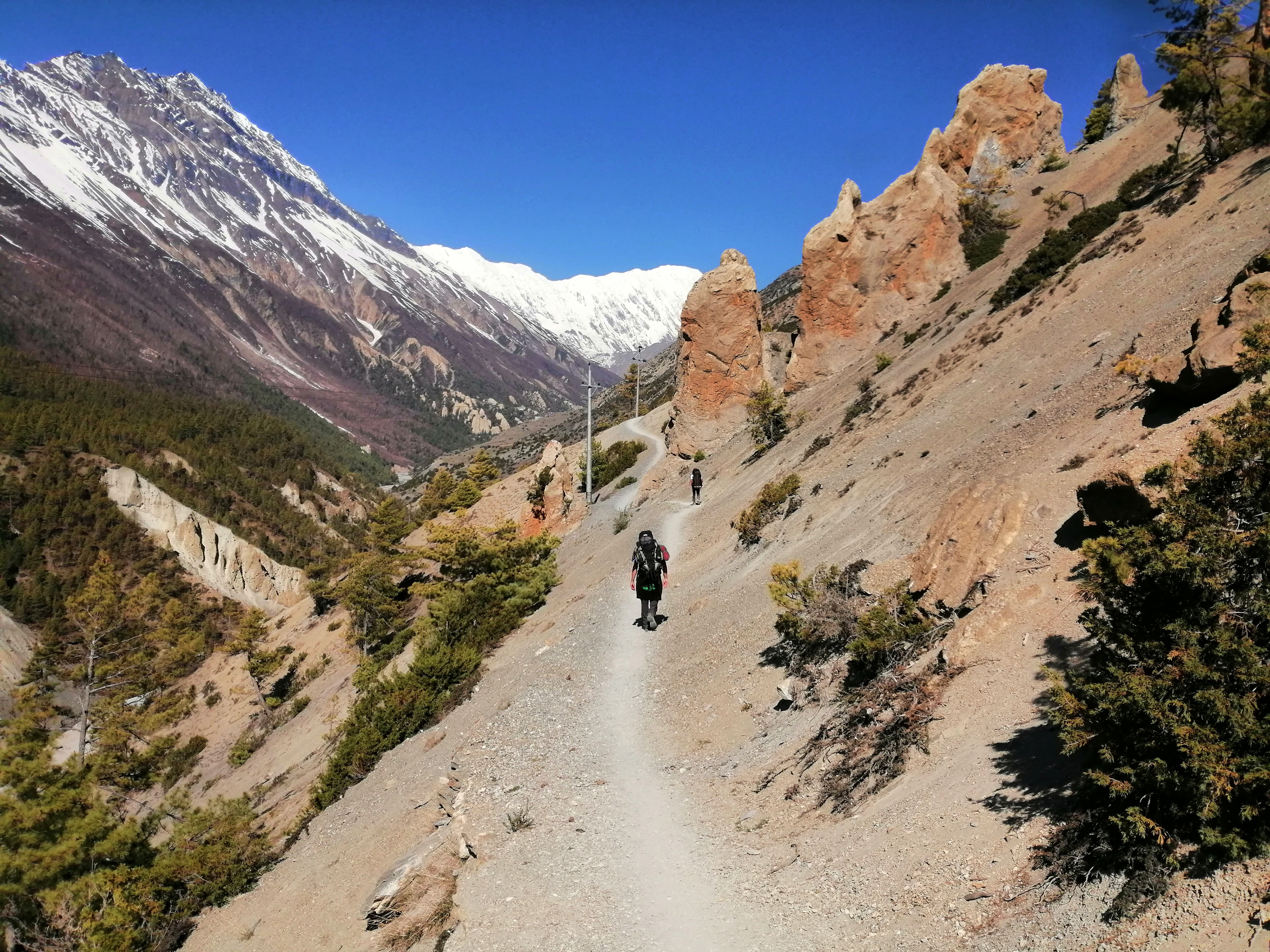
On the way to Tilicho Lake Khangsar

== Weather ==
While trekking in the Himalayas in the wet season is generally not possible, much of the Annapurna circuit sits within a rain shadow, so it is possible to trek most parts of the circuit year-round, including during the monsoon period. However, the days are often damp and many of the views are obscured by clouds.

=== October – November ===
This is the most popular hiking season in Nepal. Though the weather is generally warm, nighttime temperatures drop below freezing. This is the busiest period on the circuit and tea houses book up very quickly.

=== December – March ===
This is the coldest period on the circuit. Depending on the altitude, daytime temperatures will be cold and nighttime temperatures drop well below freezing. Thorung La Pass, which stands at over 5,400 meters, is often blocked with snow and may be closed for days on end. Clouds prevail more frequently, but clear days are still common. Towards March the rhododendrons start flowering. This period is also when avalanches are most common.

=== April – May ===
Because of the warming weather, April to May is the second most popular trekking season on the circuit. Most of the snow has melted. As the monsoon period builds toward the end of May, the days become hotter and more humid.

=== June – September ===
This is the monsoon period. Whilst the south section of the Annapurna Circuit near Pokhara gets a lot of rain, the northern parts often receive less than 10% of the precipitation due to their location within a rain shadow.

== History ==
The Annapurna area was opened to foreign trekkers in 1977 after the disputes between Khampa guerrillas operating from the area into Tibet, the local populace and the Nepal army were settled. The original trek started from the market town of Dhumre situated at the Kathmandu - Pokhara highway and ended in Pokhara, and took about 23 days to complete. Road construction started in the early 1980s both from Dhumre to the north and from Pokhara to the west and then up the Kali Gandaki valley. The road has now reached Manang on the Marsyangdi river valley and Muktinath on the Kali Gandaki side. Of the trek's original 23 days, only 2 sections of 2-3 walking days in the length of the trek are now without a motor road, namely Thorong La pass and the section over Ghorepani/Poon Hill. In some places, new trails and routes have been marked so that the road can be partly avoided. The existence of the road has nevertheless changed the area, appearance, and atmosphere of the villages. The road facilitates transport, increasing the popularity of mountain biking in the area. Since 2011, companies in Muktinath and Jomsom rent out mountain bikes to tourists. As the road sees very little traffic, one can ride downhill (dirt road and/or single track) from Muktinath to Tatopani and descend almost 3000 meters in 2–3 days.

New areas near Annapurna have been opened for trekkers in the past years, such as Upper Mustang, Nar-Pho Valley, Manaslu, and Tsum Valley. Currently, trekking in these areas is restricted and subject to extra permits, costs, and other limitations.

In October 2014, Seth Wolpin achieved the fastest known time in 72 hours and 4 minutes. He started in Besisahar and finished in Nayapull, following all the New Annapurna Trekking Trails.

It is reported that time has been recently surpassed by Greek athlete and philanthropist Lefteris Paraskevas, who, in May 2017 completed the classic route of the Circuit, from Besisahar to Nayapul, in 68 hours and 22 minutes.

=== 2014 blizzard ===
In October 2014, a sudden blizzard killed over 43 people, half of whom were Nepalese. It was caused by the tail end of a dying cyclone that had ravaged the eastern coast of India; there were about 350 hikers caught in the blizzard.

=== 2025 snowfall ===
In late October 2025, heavy snowfall affected the Annapurna Base Camp and surrounding trekking routes, prompting local authorities in Myagdi and Mustang districts to halt treks due to safety risks from deep snow and avalanche potential.

== See also ==
- Everest base camps
