= Nilgiri Himal =

Mountain in Nepal

Nilgiri
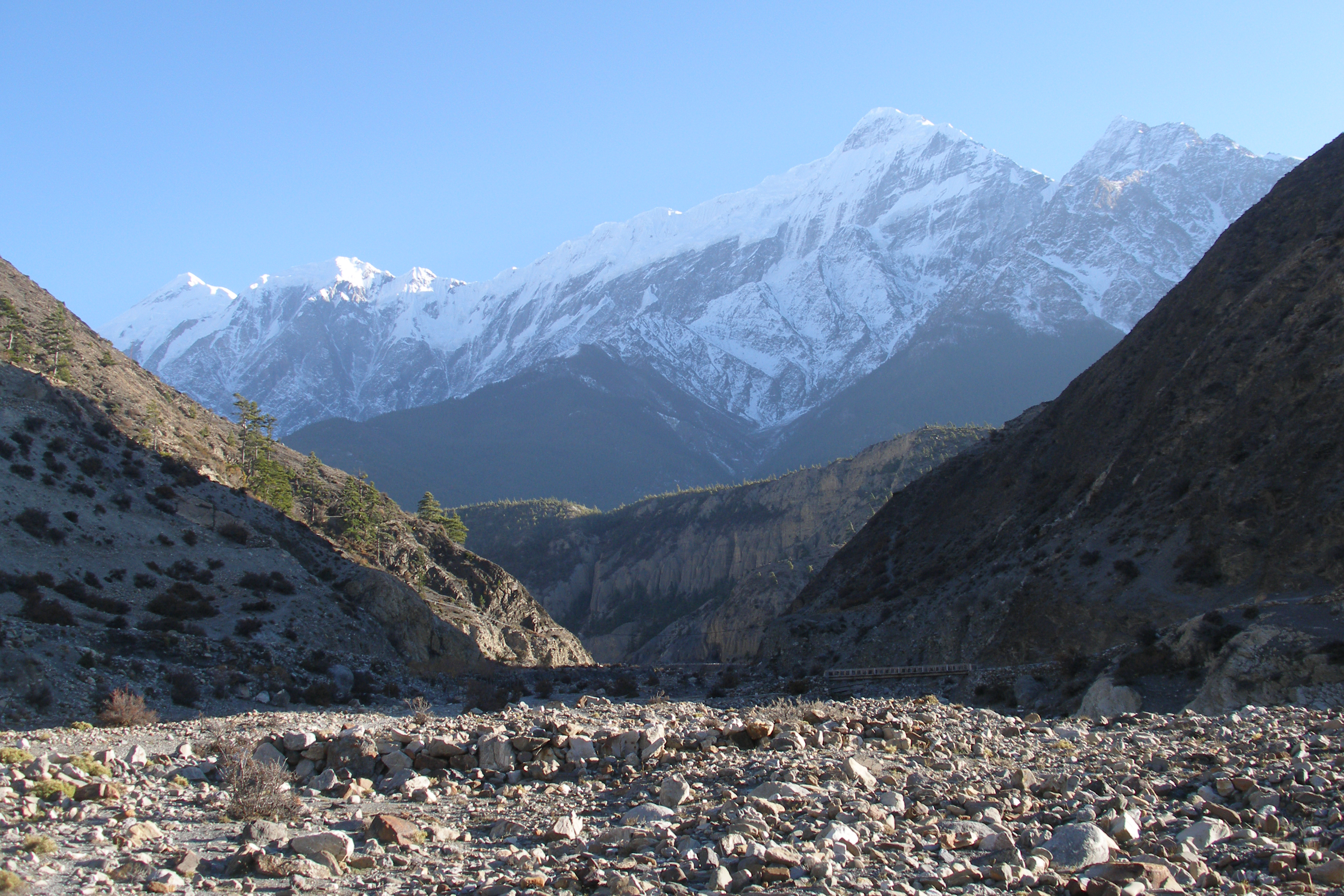
- View of Nilgiri Himal from Jomsom Valley

Highest point
- Elevation: 7,061 m (23,166 ft)
- Coordinates: 28°39′26″N 83°43′29″E

Geography
- Location within Nepal
- Country: Nepal
- Parent range: Himalayas

Climbing
- First ascent: 19 October 1962

The Nilgiri Himal (Nepali: निलगिरी हिमाल) is a mountain in the Annapurna massif in Nepal. Its main peaks are Nilgiri North at 7061 m, Nilgiri Central at 6,940 m (22,770 ft), and Nilgiri South at 6,839 m (22,438 ft).

== Climbing history ==
Nilgiri North was first ascended in October 1962 by The Netherlands Himalayan Expedition, led by famous French climber Lionel Terray.

Nilgiri South and Nilgiri Central were first ascended by Japanese teams. Nilgiri South was first ascended in 1978 by a team from Shinshu University led by Kazuo Mitsui, and Nilgiri Central was first ascended on April 30, 1979 by a team from Matsuyama University led by Masaki Aoki.

On 26 October 2015, an Austrian team composed of Hansjorg Auer, Alexander “Alex” Blumel and Gerhard “Gerry” Fiegl made the first ascent of the south face of Nilgiri South. On descent Gerhard Fiegel, suffering from extreme exhaustion, fell 800 m to his death. His climbing partners were not able to find his body.

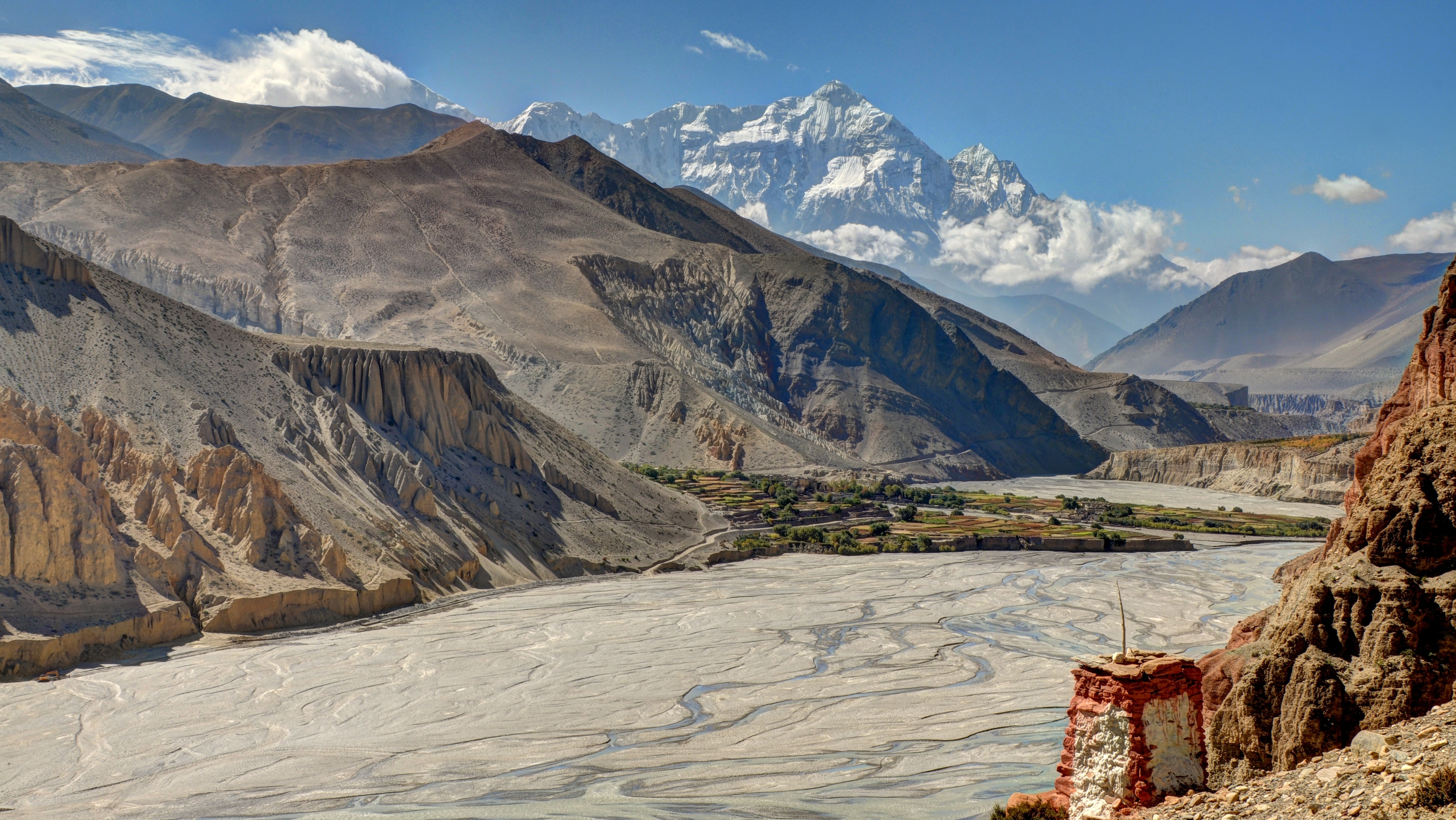
North face as seen from Chele.

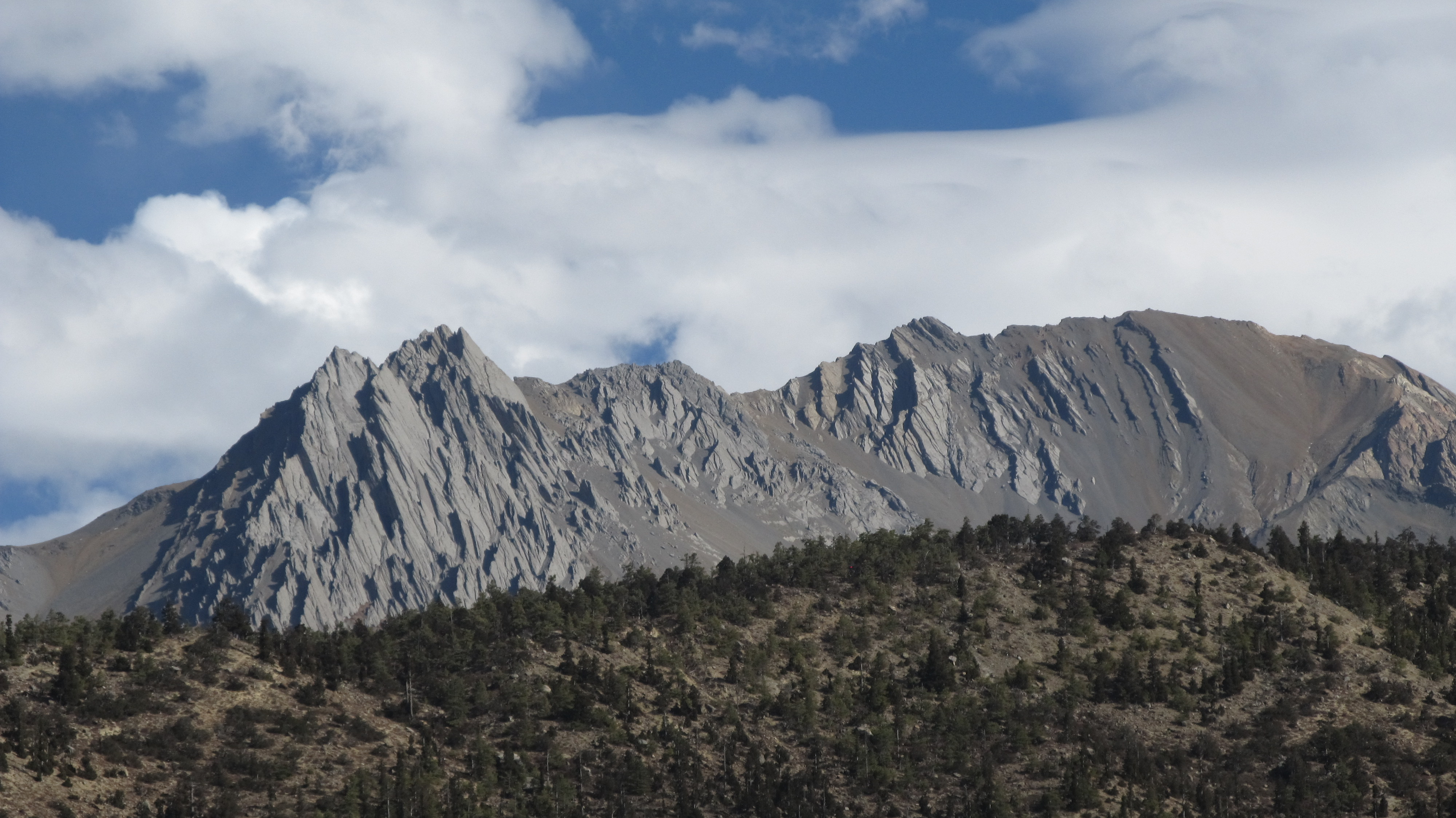
Cliffs of Nilgiri

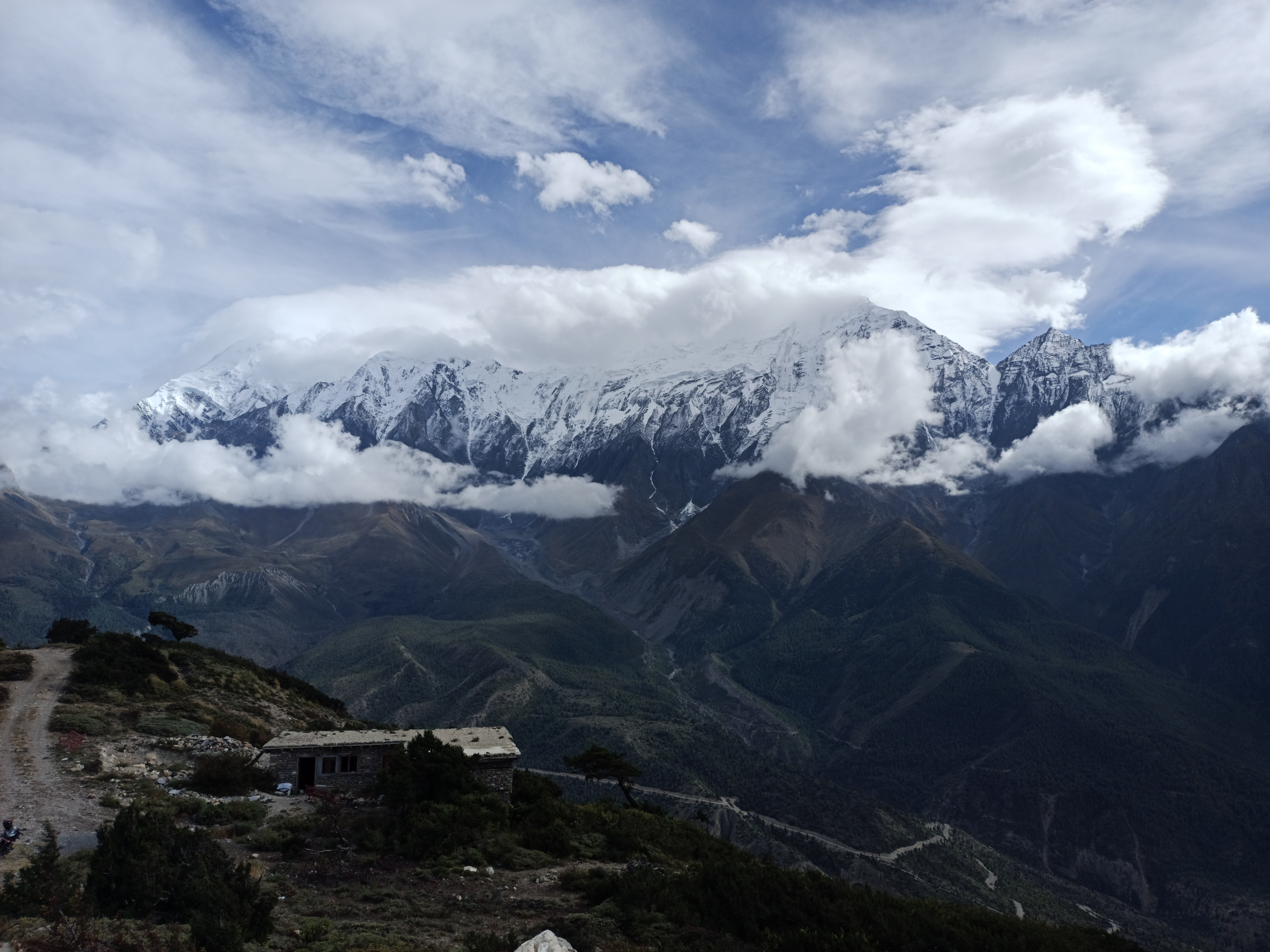
Nilgiri Himal, from Jomsom view Tower.

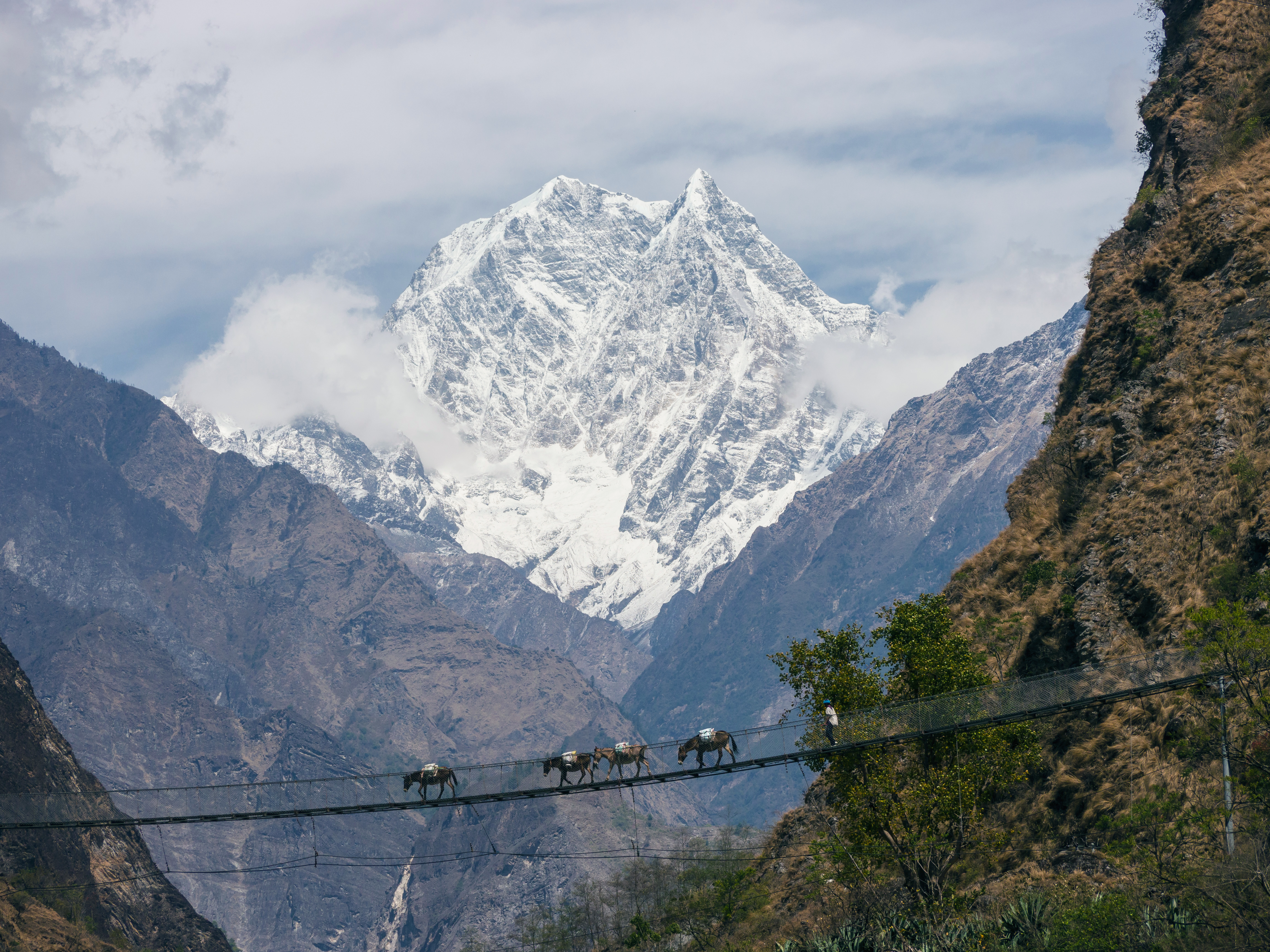
South Face from near Tatopani
