= Annapurna Conservation Area =

Protected area in the Annapurna range of the Nepalese Himalayas

- Nepali: अन्नपूर्ण संरक्षण क्षेत्र
- IUCN category VI (protected area with sustainable use of natural resources)
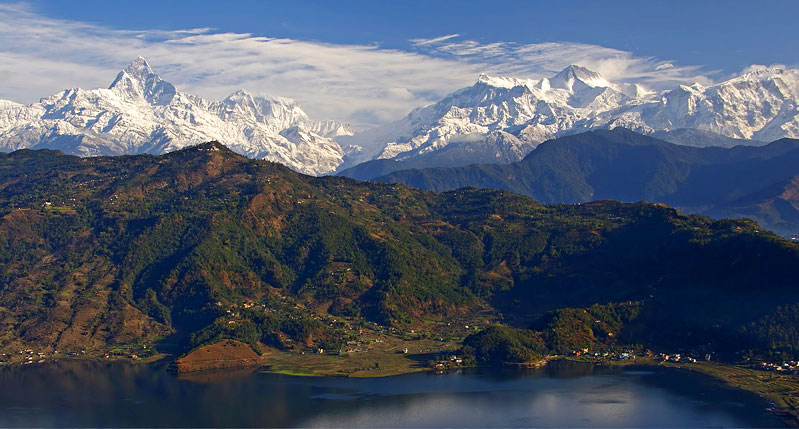
- Annapurna range as seen from Pokhara

- Location within Gandaki Province Location within Nepal Location within South Asia
- Location: Nepal
- Coordinates: 28.78°N 83.97°E
- Area: 7,629 km^{2} (2,946 sq mi)
- Established: 1992
- Governing body: Department of National Parks and Wildlife Conservation

Annapurna Conservation Area is Nepal's largest protected area covering 7,629 km^{2} (2,946 sq mi) in the Annapurna range of the Himalayas. It ranges in elevation from 790 m (2,590 ft) to the peak of Annapurna I at 8,091 m (26,545 ft). The conservation area stretches across Manang, Mustang, Kaski, Myagdi, and Lamjung Districts. Annapurna Conservation Area encompasses Annapurna Sanctuary and is known for several trekking routes including the Annapurna Circuit.

== History ==
During 1985, the Annapurna Conservation Area began.

== Climate ==
Rainfall in the southern part of the Annapurnas is higher than in the rain shadow to the north of the peaks. Annual precipitation is highest during the Asian monsoon between June and September ranging from 5,032 mm (198.1 in) on the southern slopes at 2,950 m (9,680 ft) elevation to 1,099 mm (43.3 in) in rain shadow areas at 2,760 m (9,060 ft) elevation. Snow accumulates between 2,000 and 3,000 m (6,600 and 9,800 ft). In the winter of 1999–2000, areas above 3,000 m (9,800 ft) were snow-covered until the end of March, and until May above 4,400 m (14,400 ft). At this elevation, winter air temperatures range from −4.65 to −6.06 °C (23.63 to 21.09 °F).
