= Annapurna Sanctuary =

Mountain plateau in Nepal

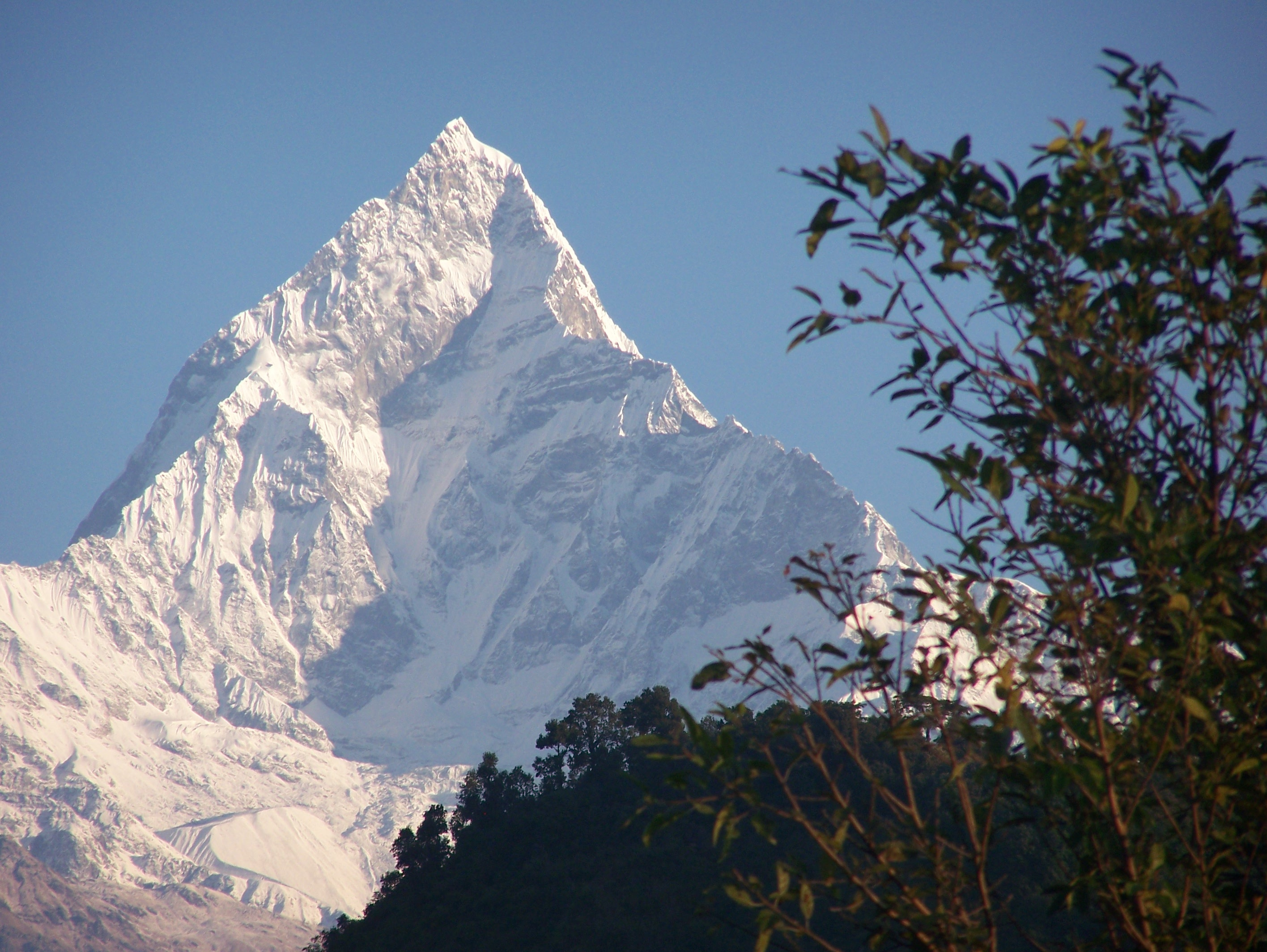

Highest point
- Elevation: 4,130 m (13,550 ft)
- Coordinates: 28°31′48″N 83°52′40.8″E

Geography
- Location within Nepal
- Location: Annapurna Rural Municipality 10, Ghandruk, Kaski, Central Nepal
- Parent range: Himalayas

The Annapurna Sanctuary is a high glacial basin lying 40 km directly north of Pokhara. This oval-shaped plateau sits at an altitude of over 4000 metres, and is surrounded by a ring of mountains, the Annapurna range, most of which are over 7000 metres. With the only entrance being a narrow valley between the peaks of Hiunchuli and Machapuchare, where run-off from glaciers drains into the Modi Khola River. Because of the high mountains on all sides, the Annapurna Sanctuary receives only seven hours of sunlight a day at the height of summer. The south-facing slopes are covered in dense tropical jungles of rhododendron and bamboo, while the north-facing slopes, in the rain shadow, have a drier colder climate similar to that of the near-by Tibetan Plateau.

The entire sanctuary was held as sacred to the Gurung people, one of the many native people to inhabit the area. They believed it was the repository of gold and various treasures left by the Nāgas, the serpent-gods known in India. The sanctuary was believed to be the home of several deities, from Hinduism and Buddhism as well as older animistic gods. The peak of Machapuchare at the entrance was believed to be the home of the god Shiva, and the daily plumes of snow were thought to be the smoke of his divine incense. Until recently, the local Gurung people forbade anyone from bringing eggs or meat into the Annapurna Sanctuary, and women and untouchables were prohibited from going there as well.

The Sanctuary was not penetrated by outsiders until 1956 when Colonel Jimmy Roberts, who was reconnoitring the approach to Machapuchare in preparation for an attempt on the peak the following year, reached the area enclosed by the various peaks of the Annapurnas, Machapuchare and Hiunchuli. He had spent three days climbing through the gorge of the Modi Khola 'most of the way by dismal bamboo slogging' after leaving the village of Chomrong. The area was first described as the Sanctuary in the book written about the Machapuchare expedition.

The Annapurna Sanctuary is now part of the Annapurna Conservation Area Project, which places restrictions on number of outside travelers, gathering of firewood, and domestic animal grazing.

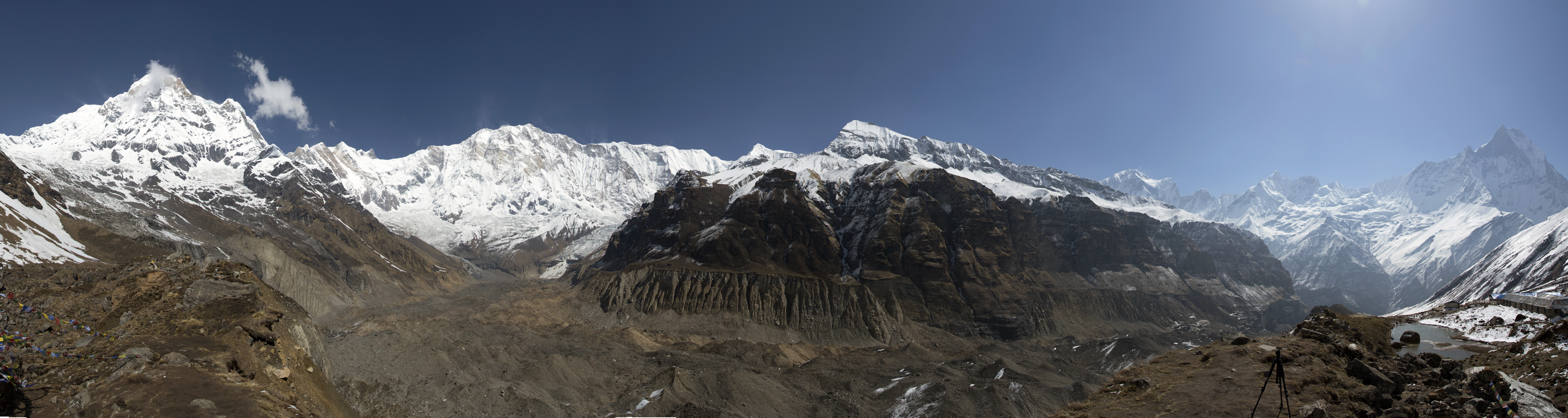
Panorama of the Annapurna Sanctuary from the Annapurna base camp
