= Machapuchare =

Mountain in Nepal

- माछापुच्छ्रे
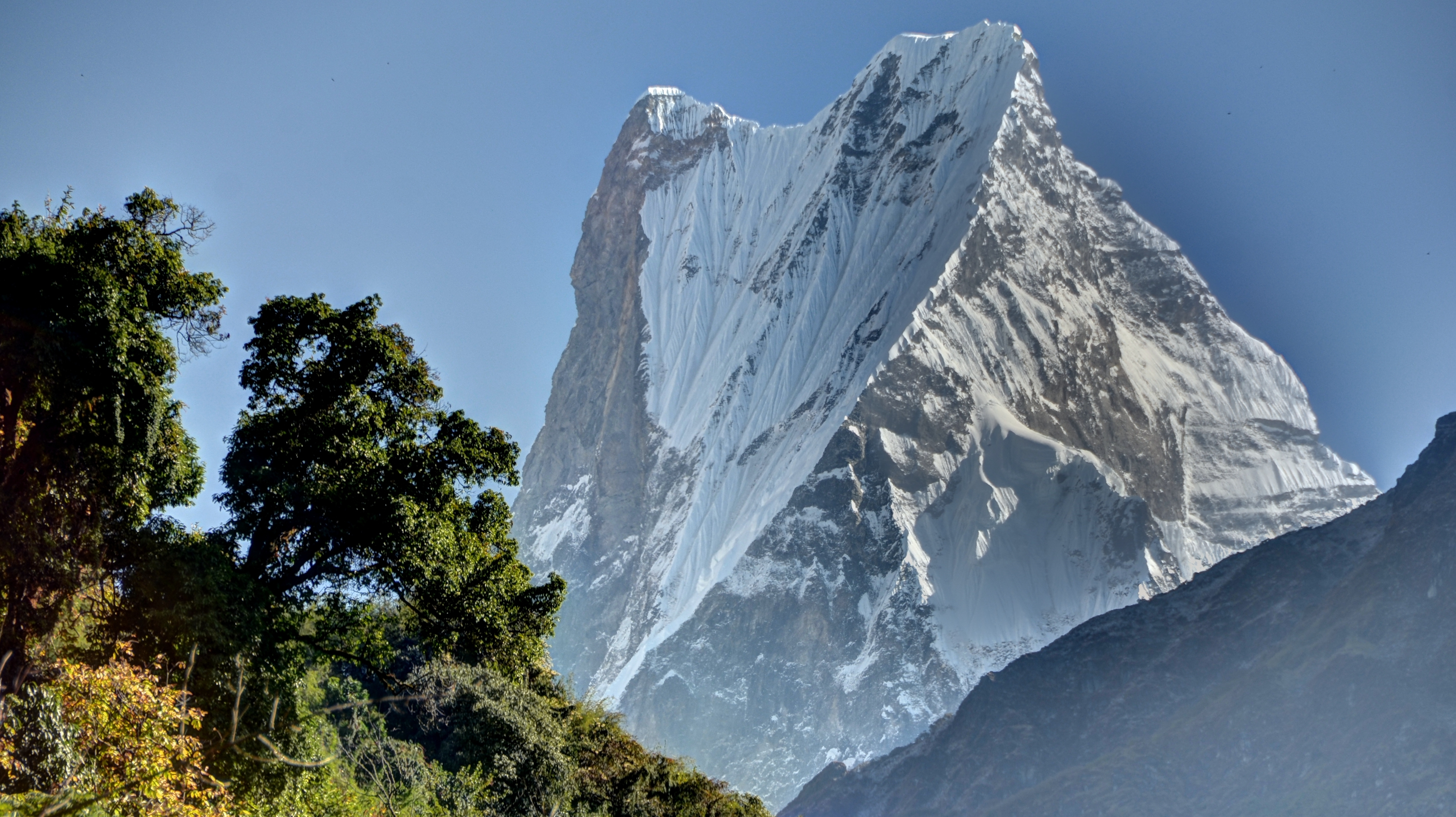
- Machapuchare from near Chhomrong Village

Highest point
- Elevation: 6,993 m (22,943 ft)
- Prominence: 1,233 m (4,045 ft)
- Coordinates: 28°29′42″N 83°56′57″E

Naming
- Native name: माछापुच्छ्रे (Nepali) (Māchhāpuchhre); कतासुँ क्लिको (Gurung) (Katasuṅ Klikō)
- English translation: Nepali: Fishtail

Geography
- Location within Nepal
- Location: North Central Nepal
- Parent range: Annapurna Himalayas

Climbing
- First ascent: Unclimbed (ascents not allowed)

Night view of Machhapuchhare from MBC

Machapuchare, Machhapuchchhre or Machhapuchhre (Nepali: माछापुच्छ्रे, lit. 'fishtail'; Tamu: कतासुँ क्लिको), is a mountain situated in the Annapurna massif of Gandaki Province, north-central Nepal. Its highest peak has never been officially climbed due to the impossibility of gaining a permit from the government of Nepal.

== Location ==
Machapuchare is at the end of a long spur ridge, coming south out of the main backbone of the Annapurna massif, which forms the eastern boundary of the Annapurna Sanctuary. The peak is about 25 km (16 mi) north of Pokhara, the provincial capital of the Gandaki Province. The sanctuary is a favorite trekking destination, and the site of the base camps for the South Face of Annapurna and many other named and unnamed peaks.

== Notable features ==
Due to its southern position in the range and the particularly low terrain that lies south of the Annapurna Himalayas, which contains three of the 10 highest peaks in the world, Machapuchare commands tremendous vertical relief in a short horizontal distance. This, combined with its steep, pointed profile, makes it a particularly striking peak, despite its lower elevation than some of its neighbors. Its double summit resembles the tail of a fish, hence the name meaning "fish's tail" in Nepalese. It is also nicknamed the "Matterhorn of Nepal".

It is a sacred peak for the Gurungs and the people of Chomrong. The mountain is said to be sacred as a home to the god Shiva.

== Climbing history ==
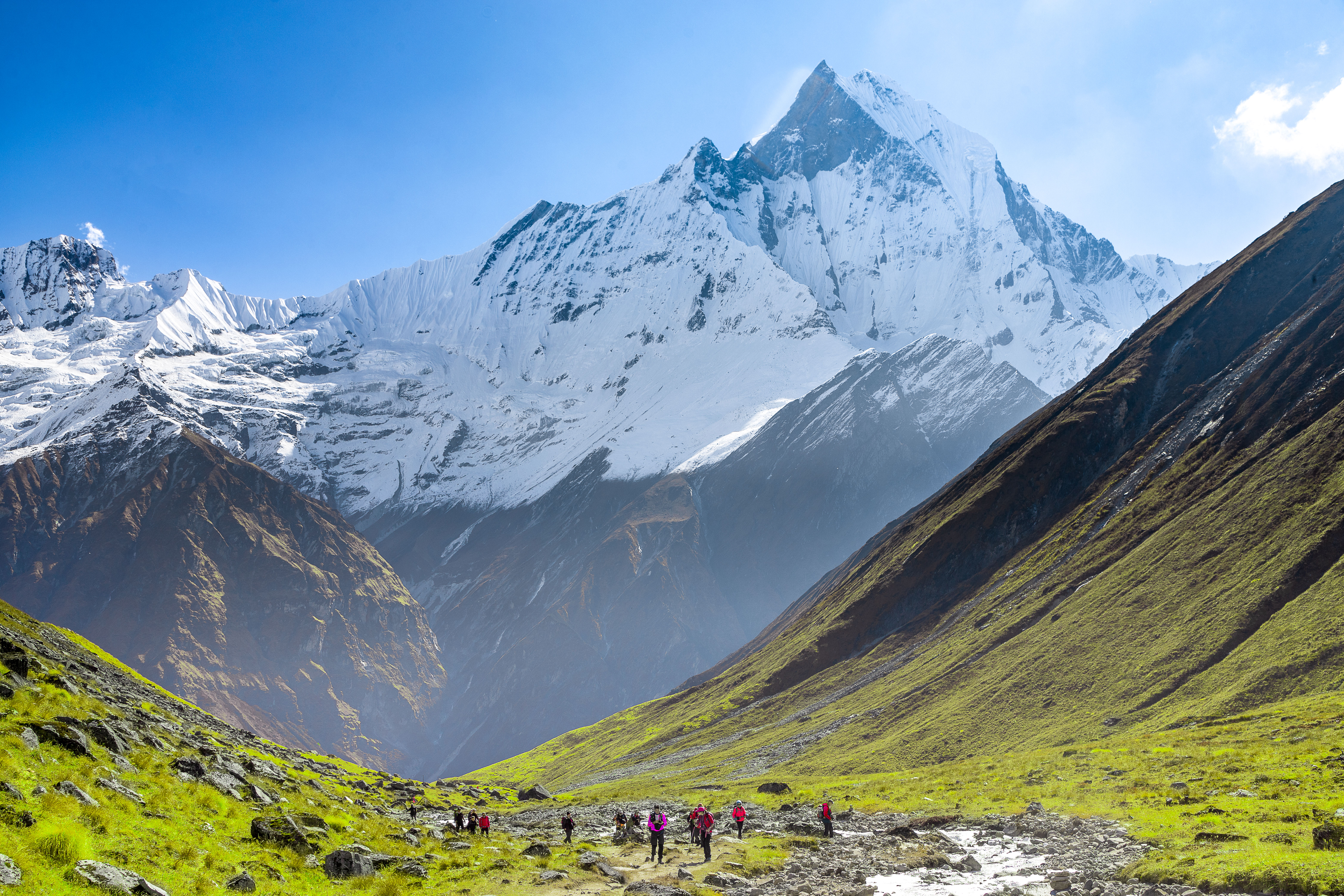
Machapuchare seen on the way to Annapurna Base Camp

It is believed that Machapuchare has never been climbed to the summit. The only confirmed attempt was in 1957 by a British team led by Lieutenant Colonel Jimmy Roberts. Climbers Wilfrid Noyce and A. D. M. Cox climbed to within 150 ft (46 m) of the summit via the north ridge, to an approximate altitude of 22,793 ft (6,947 m). King Mahendra had given them permission to climb the mountain but forbade them from setting foot on the summit itself, terms with which the team complied. Noyce and his team compiled and published the only climbing record of the mountain a year later. Early in the expedition another member of the party, Roger Chorley, contracted polio; with help from Jimmy Roberts he left the expedition to seek medical assistance.

No permits to climb the mountain have been issued since then, but there are reports of a New Zealand climber, Bill Denz, illegally but successfully reaching the summit in the early 1980s.

== Sources ==
- Fanshawe, Andy; Venables, Stephen (1995). Himalaya Alpine Style. Hodder and Stoughton.
- Ohmori, Koichiro (1994). Over The Himalaya. Cloudcap Press/The Mountaineers.
