= Divine madness =

Behavior linked to spiritual pursuits

Divine madness, also known as theia mania and crazy wisdom, is unconventional, outrageous, unexpected, or unpredictable behavior linked to religious or spiritual pursuits. Examples of divine madness can be found in Buddhism, Christianity, Hellenism, Hinduism, Islam, and Shamanism.

It is usually explained as a manifestation of enlightened behavior by persons who have transcended societal norms, or as a means of spiritual practice or teaching among mendicants and teachers. These behaviors may seem to be symptoms of mental illness, but could also be manifestations of religious ecstasy or even be "strategic, purposeful activity" "by highly self-aware individuals making strategic use of the theme of madness in the construction of their public personas".

== Cross-cultural parallels ==
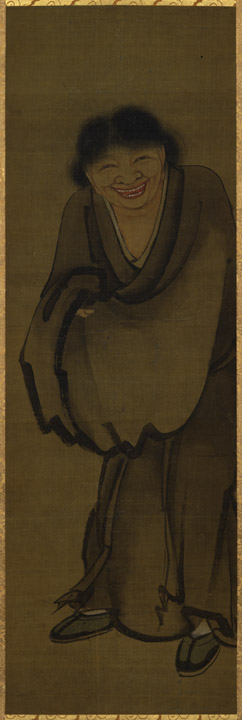
Yan Hui depicts the crazy-wise Hanshan 寒山. Color on silk. Tokyo National Museum

According to June McDaniel and other scholars, divine madness is found in the history and practices of many cultures and may reflect religious ecstasy or expression of divine love. Plato in his Phaedrus and his ideas on theia mania, Eastern Orthodoxy, Western Christianity, Sufism along with Indian religions all bear witness to the phenomenon of divine madness. It is not the ordinary form of madness, but a behavior that is consistent with the premises of a spiritual path or a form of complete absorption in God.

DiValerio notes that comparable "mad saint" traditions exist in Buddhist, Hindu, Islamic and Christian cultures, but warns against "flights of fancy" that too easily draw comparisons between these various phenomena.

Georg Feuerstein lists Zen poet Hanshan (fl. 9th century) as having divine madness, explaining that when people would ask him about Zen, he would only laugh hysterically. The Zen master Ikkyu (15th century) used to run around his town with a human skeleton spreading the message of the impermanence of life and the grim certainty of death. According to Feuerstein, similar forms of abnormal social behavior and holy madness is found in the history of the Christian saint Isadora and the Sufi Islam storyteller Mulla Nasruddin. Divine madness has parallels in other religions, such as Hinduism.

== Ancient Greece and Rome: theia mania ==
Theia mania (Ancient Greek: θεία μανία) is a term used by Plato in his dialogue Phaedrus to describe a condition of divine madness (unusual behavior attributed to the intervention of a God). In this work, dating from around 370 BC, Socrates argues that madness is not necessarily an evil, claiming that "the greatest of blessings come to us through madness, when it is sent as a gift of the gods".

Socrates describes four types of divine madness:

- the prophetic frenzy of the Oracle of Delphi and the priestesses of Dodona (the gift of Apollo)
- mystical revelations and initiations, which provide "a way of release for those in need" (the gift of Dionysus)
- poetic inspiration (the gift of the Muses)
- the madness of lovers (the gift of Aphrodite and Eros)

Plato expands on these ideas in another dialogue, Ion.

One well-known manifestation of divine madness in ancient Greece was in the cult of the Maenads, the female followers of Dionysus. However, little is known about their rituals; the famous depiction of the cult in Euripides' play The Bacchae cannot be considered historically accurate.

The Roman poet Virgil, in Book VI of his Aeneid, describes the Cumaean Sibyl as prophesying in a frenzied state:

While at the door they paused, the virgin cried:
"Ask now thy doom!—the god! the god is nigh!"
So saying, from her face its color flew,
Her twisted locks flowed free, the heaving breast
Swelled with her heart's wild blood; her stature seemed
Vaster, her accent more than mortal man,
As all th' oncoming god around her breathed...

== Abrahamic religions ==
=== Christianity ===
The 6th-century Saint Simeon, states Feuerstein, simulated insanity with skill. Simeon found a dead dog, tied a cord to the corpse's leg and dragged it through the town, outraging the people. To Simeon the dead dog represented a form of baggage people carry in their spiritual life. He would enter the local church and throw nuts at the congregation during the liturgy, which he later explained to his friend that he was denouncing the hypocrisy in worldly acts and prayers.

St. Nicholas of Trani was another saint considered to be insane due to his life of voluntary poverty and his habit of constantly shouting the phrase 'Kyrie Eleison'.

Michael Andrew Screech states that the interpretation of madness in Christianity is adopted from the Platonic belief that madness comes in two forms: bad and good, depending on the assumptions about "the normal" by the majority. Early Christians cherished madness, and being called "mad" by non-Christians. To them it was glossolalia or the "tongue of angels". Christ's behavior and teachings were blasphemous madness in his times, and according to Simon Podmore, "Christ's madness served to sanctify blasphemous madness".

Religious ecstasy-type madness was interpreted as good by early Christians, in the Platonic sense. Yet, as Greek philosophy went out of favor in Christian theology, so did these ideas. In the age of Renaissance, charismatic madness regained interest and popular imagination, as did the Platonic proposal of four types of "good madness". In a Christian theological context, these were interpreted in part as divine rapture, an escape from the restraint of society, a frenzy for freedom of the soul.

In the 20th-century, Pentecostalism – the charismatic movements within Protestant Christianity particularly in the United States, Latin America and Africa – has encouraged the practice of divine madness among its followers. The wisdom and healing power in the possessed, in these movements, is believed to be from the Holy Spirit, a phenomenon called charism ("spiritual gifts"). According to Tanya Luhrmann, the associated "hearing of spiritual voices" may seem to be "mental illness" to many people, but to the followers who shout and dance together as a crowd it isn't. The followers believe that there is a long tradition in Christian spirituality, where saints such as Augustine are stated to have had similar experiences of deliberate hallucinations and madness.

=== Islam ===
Divine madness is a theme in some forms of Islamic mysticism. People that have attained "mad" mental states, according to Feuerstein, include the masts and the intoxicated Sufis associated with shath. In parts of Gilgit (Pakistan), the behavior of eccentric faqirs dedicated to mystical devotionalism is considered as "crazy holiness". In Somalia, according to Sheik Abdi, Moḥammed ʻAbdulle Hassan eccentric behavior and methods led some colonial era writers to call him "mad mullah", "crazy priest of Allah" and others.

According to Sadeq Rahimi, the Sufi description of divine madness in mystical union mirrors those associated with mental illness. He writes,

The similarities between the Sufi formulation of divine madness and the folk experience of psychosis are too clear and too frequent among the Turkish patients to be treated as coincidences.

In West African version of Sufism, according to Lynda Chouiten, examples of insane saints are a part of Maraboutisme where the mad and idiotic behavior of a marabout was compared to a mental illness and considered a form of divine folly, of holiness. However, adds Chouiten, Sufism has been accommodating of such divine madness behavior unlike orthodox Islam.

== Indian religions ==
=== Hinduism ===
The theme of divine madness appears in all major traditions of Hinduism (Shaivism, Vaishnavism and Shaktism), both in its mythologies as well as its saints, accomplished mendicants and teachers. They are portrayed as if they are acting mad or crazy, challenging social assumptions and norms as a part of their spiritual pursuits or resulting thereof.

==== Avadhuta ====
According to Feuerstein, the designation avadhūta (Sanskrit: अवधूत) came to be associated with the mad or eccentric holiness or "crazy wisdom" of some paramahamsa, liberated religious teachers, who reverted the social norms, as symbolized by their being "skyclad" or "naked" (Sanskrit: digambara). (Note: Feuerstein: "The appellation "avadhuta," more than any other, came to be associated with the apparently crazy modes of behaviour of some paramahamsas, who dramatize the reversal of social norms, a behaviour characteristic of their spontaneous lifestyle. Their frequent nakedness is perhaps the most symbolic expression of this reversal.") Avadhuta are described in the Sannyasa Upanishads of Hinduism, early mediaeval Sanskrit texts that discuss the monastic (sannyasa, literally "house-leaver") life of Hindu sadhus (monks) and sadhvis (nuns). The Avadhuta is one category of mendicants, and is described as antinomian. The term means "shaken off, one who has removed worldly feeling/attachments, someone who has cast off all mortal concerns". He is described as someone who is actually wise and normal, but appears to others who don't understand him as "mad, crazy". His behavior may include being strangely dressed (or naked), sleeping in cremation grounds, acting like an animal, a "lunatic" storing his food in a skull, among others. According to Feuerstein, "the avadhuta is one who, in their God-intoxication, has "cast off" all concerns and conventional standards." Feuerstein further states that in traditional Tibet and India, "the "holy fool" or "saintly madman" [and madwoman] has long been recognized as a legitimate figure in the compass of spiritual aspiration and realization."

==== Bhakti ====
The bhakti tradition emerged in Hinduism in the medieval era. It is related to religious ecstasy, and its accompanying states of trance and intense emotions. According to McDaniel, devotional ecstasy is "a radical alteration of perception, emotion or personality which brings the person closer to what he regards as sacred." It may be compared to drsti, direct perception or spontaneous thought, as opposed to learned ideas. The bhakta establishes a reciprocal relationship with the divine. Though the participation in the divine is generally favoured in Vaishnava bhakti discourse throughout the sampradayas rather than imitation of the divine 'play' (Sanskrit: lila), there is the important anomaly of the Vaishnava-Sahajiya sect.

McDaniel notes that the actual behavior and experiences of ecstatics may violate the expected behavior as based on texts. While texts describe "stages of religious development and gradual growth of insight and emotion," real-life experiences may be "a chaos of states that must be forced into a religious mold," in which they often don't fit. This discrepancy may lead to a mistaken identification of those experiences as "mad" or "possessed," and the application of exorcism and Ayurvedic treatments to fit those ecstatics into the mold.

McDaniel refers to William James, who made a distinction between gradual and abrupt change, while Karl Potter makes a distinction between progress and leap philosophies. Progress philosophy is jativada, gradual development; leap philosophy is ajativada, "sudden knowledge or intuition." Both approaches can also be found in Bengal bhakti. In ritual ecstasy, yogic and tantric practices have been incorporated, together with the idea of a gradual development through spiritual practices. For spontaneous ecstatics, the reverse is true: union with the divine leads to bodily control and detachment. The same distinction is central in the classical Zen-rhetorics on sudden insight, which developed in 7th-century China. (Note: See also Kenshō#Sudden insight, and: * Gregory, Peter N., ed. (1991), Sudden and Gradual. Approaches to Enlightenment in Chinese Thought, Delhi: Motilal Banarsidass Publishers Private Limited * McRae, John (2003), Seeing Through Zen. Encounter, Transformation, and Genealogy in Chinese Chan Buddhism, The University Press Group Ltd, ISBN 978-0-520-23798-8 Bernard Faure, The Rhetorics of Immediacy)

The path of gradual progression is called sastriya dharma, "the path of scriptural injunctions." It is associated with order and control, and "loyalty to lineage and tradition, acceptance of hierarchy and authority, and ritual worship and practice." In contrast, the path of sudden breakthrough is asastriya, "not according to the scriptures." It is associated with "chaos and passion, and the divine is reached by unpredictable visions and revelations." The divine can be found in such unorthodox surroundings and items as burning grounds, blood and sexuality. Divine experience is not determined by loyalty to lineage and gurus, and various gurus may be followed. According to McDaniel, divine madness is a major aspect of this breakthrough approach.

=== Tibetan Buddhism: nyönpa, drubnyon, and "crazy wisdom" ===
==== Holy madmen ====
In Tibetan Buddhism, nyönpa (Wylie: smyon pa), tantric "crazy yogis," are part of the Nyingma and Kagyu traditions. Their behavior may seem scandalous according to conventional standards, but the archetypal siddha is a defining characteristic of the Nyingma tradition, which differs significantly from the more scholarly orientated Gelugpa. Its founder, Padmasambhava (India, 8th century), is an archetypal siddha, who is still commemorated by yearly dances. Milarepa (c.1052–c.1135 CE), the founder of the Kagyu school, is also closely connected to the notion of divine madness in Tibetan Buddhism. His biography was composed by Tsangnyön Heruka (1452–1507), "the Madman of Tsang," a famous nyönpa. Other famous madmen are Drukpa Kunley (1455–1529) and the Madman of Ü. Together they are also known as "the Three Madmen" (smyon pa gsum). Indian siddhas and their Tibetan counterparts, also played an essential role in the Tibetan Renaissance (c.950-1250 CE), when Buddhism was reestablished in Tibet.

According to DiValerio, the Tibetan term nyönpa refers to siddhas, yogins and lamas whose "mad" behavior is "symptomatic of high achievement in religious practice." This behavior is most widely understood in Tibet as "a symptom of the individuals being enlightened and having transcended ordinary worldly delusions." Their unconventional behavior is seen by Tibetans as a sign of their transcendence of namtok (Sanskrit: vipalka), "conceptual formations or false ideations." While their behavior may be seen as repulsive from a dualistic point of view, the enlightened view transcends the dualistic view of repulsive and nonrepulsive.

It is regarded as manifesting naturally, not intentionally, though it is sometimes also interpreted as intentional behavior "to help unenlightened beings realize the emptiness of phenomena, or as part of the yogin's own training toward that realization." It may also be seen as a way of training, to transcend the boundaries of convention and thereby the boundaries of one's ordinary self-perception, giving way to "a more immediate way of experiencing the world—a way that is based on the truth of emptiness, rather than our imperfect habits of mind." While the well-known nyönpa are considered to be fully enlightened, the status of lesser-known yogins remains unknown, and the nature of their unconventional behavior may not be exactly determinable, also not by lamas.

According to DiValerio, the term drupton nyönpa is regarded by Tibetans as an oxymoron, a contradiction in terms, and so

An insane person cannot be a siddha, and a siddha, by definition, cannot be insane—at least, not in the medical understanding of madness.

DiValerio also argues that their unconventional behavior is "strategic, purposeful activity, rather than being the byproduct of a state of enlightenment," and concludes that "the 'holy madman' tradition is constituted by highly self-aware individuals making strategic use of the theme of madness in the construction of their public personas," arguing that

the distinctive eccentric behavior of the Madmen of Ü and Tsang is best understood as a form of "tantric fundamentalism" in that it was based on following a literal reading of the Highest Yoga tantras, enacted as a strategic response to changes taking place in late 15th-century Tibetan religious culture. The "madness" of Drukpa Künlé resulted from his taking a critical stance towards Tibetan religious culture in general.

==== Crazy wisdom ====
In some Buddhist literature, the phrase "crazy wisdom" is associated with the teaching methods of Chögyam Trungpa, himself a Nyingma and Kagyu master, who popularized the notion with his adepts Keith Dowman and Georg Feuerstein. (Note: DiValerio questions the reliability of Feuerstein's account: "Feuerstein is by his own admission an advocate of spirituality rather than a scholar of religion. But what he lacks in scholarly rigor, he makes up for in popular appeal and book sales. Unrestrained by indebtedness to traditional Tibetan ways of thinking or to scholarly standards, writers like Feuerstein and Dowman are free to tailor their accounts for western readers.) The term "crazy wisdom" translates the Tibetan term drubnyon, a philosophy that "traditionally combines exceptional insight and impressive magical power with a flamboyant disregard for conventional behavior." In his book Crazy Wisdom, which consists of transcripts of seminars on the eight aspects of Padmasambhava given in 1972, Trungpa describes the phenomenon as a process of enquiry and letting go of any hope for an answer:

We go on deeper and deeper and deeper and deeper, until we reach the point where there is no answer. [...] At that point we tend to give up hope of an answer, or of anything whatsoever, for that matter. [...] This hopelessness is the essence of crazy wisdom. It is hopeless, utterly hopeless. (Note: Trungpa: "Instead we explore further and further and further without looking for an answer. [...] We don't make a big point or an answer out of any one thing. For example, we might think that because we have discovered one particular thing that is wrong with us, that must be it, that must be the problem, that must be the answer. No. We don't fixate on that, we go further. "Why is that the case?" We look further and further. We ask: "Why is this so?" Why is there spirituality? Why is there awakening? Why is there this moment of relief? Why is there such a thing as discovering the pleasure of spirituality? Why, why, why?" We go on deeper and deeper and deeper and deeper, until we reach the point where there is no answer. [...] At that point we tend to give up hope of an answer, or of anything whatsoever, for that matter. [...] This hopelessness is the essence of crazy wisdom. It is hopeless, utterly hopeless.")

Since Trungpa described crazy wisdom in various ways, DiValerio has suggested that he did not have a fixed idea of crazy wisdom.

According to DiValerio, Keith Dowman's The Divine Madman: The Sublime Life and Songs of Drukpa Kunley is "the single most influential document in shaping how Euro-Americans have come to think about Tibetan holy madman phenomenon." Dowman's understanding of the holymadmen is akin to the Tibetan interpretations, seeing the Tibetan holy madmen as "crazy" by conventional standards, yet noting that compared to the Buddhist spiritual ideal "it is the vast majority of us who are insane." Dowman also suggests other explanations for Drukpa Künlé’s unconventional behavior, including criticising institutionalized religion, and acting as a catalysator for direct insight. According to DiValerio, Dowman's view of Künlé as criticising Tibetan religious institutions is not shared by contemporary Tibetan religious specialist, but part of Dowman's own criticism of religious institutions. DiValerio further notes that "Dowman’s presentation of Drukpa Künlé as roundly anti-institutional [had] great influence [...] in shaping (and distorting) the Euro-American world’s thinking on the subject." (Note: Compare Spiritual but not religious.)

According to Feuerstein, who was influenced by Trungpa, divine madness is unconventional, outrageous, unexpected, or unpredictable behavior that is considered a manifestation of spiritual accomplishment. This includes archetypes like the holy fool and the trickster.

==== Immediatism ====
Arthur Versluis notes that several or most of the teachers who are treated by Feuerstein as exemplary for divine madness, or crazy wisdom, are exemplary for immediatism. These include Adi Da, the teacher of Feuerstein, and Rajneesh. "Immediatism" refers to "a religious assertion of spontaneous, direct, unmediated spiritual insight into reality (typically with little or no prior training), which some term 'enlightenment'." According to Versluis, immediatism is typical for Americans, who want "the fruit of religion, but not its obligations." Although immediatism has its roots in European culture and history as far back as Platonism, and also includes Perennialism, Versluis points to Ralph Waldo Emerson as its key ancestor, who "emphasized the possibility of immediate, direct spiritual knowledge and power."

Versluis notes that traditional Tibetan Buddhism is not immediatist, since Mahamudra and Dzogchen "are part of a fairly stricted controlled ritual and meditative practice and tradition." yet, he also refers to R.C. Zaehner, "who came to regard Asian-religion-derived nondualism as more or less inexorably to antinomianism, immorality, and social dissolution." Versluis further notes that in traditional Mahamudra and Dzogchen, access to teachings is restricted and needs preparation. Versluis further notes that immediatist teachers may be attractive due to their sense of certainty, which contrasts with the post-modernist questioning of truth-claims. He further notes the lack of compassion which is often noted in regard to those immediatist teachers.

== Shamanism ==
According to Mircea Eliade, divine madness is a part of Shamanism, a state that a pathologist or psychologist is likely to diagnose as a mental disease or aberrant psychological condition. However, state Eliade and Harry Eiss, this would be a misdiagnosis because the Shaman is "in control of the mystic state, rather than the psychotic state being in control of him". A Shaman predictably enters into the trance state, with rituals such as music and dance, then comes out of it when he wants to. A mental illness lacks these characteristics. Further, at least to the participants, the Shaman's actions and trance has meaning and power, either as a healer or in another spiritual sense.

According to neuroendocrinology researcher Robert Sapolsky, shamans exhibit metamagical thought, psychiatric instability, hallucinations, schizotypal disorders and behaviors ("half-crazy"). However, they do not exhibit the full spectrum of typical symptoms of mental illness. They are respected in their communities, rewarded materially and reproductively. Sapolsky notes that schizotypal shamanism is not uncontrolled, as in schizophrenics.

== See also ==
- Antinomianism
- Bipolar disorder
- Demonic possession
- Divine ecstasy
- Foolishness for Christ
- Heyoka
- Ikkyū
- Ji Gong
- Mental health of Jesus
- Nyonpa, crazy wisdom practitioners in Tibetan Buddhism.
- Village idiot

== Sources ==
- Ardussi, J.; Epstein, L. (1978). "The Saintly Madman in Tibet". Himalayan Anthropology: The Indo-Tibetan Interface. James F. Fisher (ed.). Paris: Mouton & Co.: 327–338. doi:10.1515/9783110806496.327. ISBN 9027977003. Archived from the original on 2016-01-14.
- Bell, S. (2002), "Scandals in Emerging Western Buddhism" (PDF), Westward Dharma : Buddhism beyond Asia, Berkeley: University of California Press
- Curren, Erik D. (2008), Buddha's Not Smiling: Uncovering Corruption at the Heart of Tibetan Buddhism Today, Motilall Banarsidass
- Dimock, Edward C. Jr. (1966), The Place of the Hidden Moon: Erotic Mysticism in the Vaisnava-Sahajiya cult of Bengal, Chicago: University of Chicago Press, ISBN 8120809963
- DiValerio, David Michael (2011), Subversive Sainthood and Tantric Fundamentalism: An Historical Study of Tibet's Holy Madmen, University of Virginia (PhD-thesis)
- DiValerio, David (2015), The Holy Madmen of Tibet, Oxford University Press
- Feuerstein, Georg (1991), "Holy Madness: The shock tactics and radical teachings of crazy-wise adepts, holy fools, and rascal gurus", Yoga Journal, New York: Paragon House, ISBN 1-55778-250-4
- Feuerstein, Georg (2006), Holy Madness: Spirituality, Crazy-Wise Teachers, And Enlightenment (Rev. & Expanded ed.), Hohm Press, ISBN 1-890772-54-2
- Feuerstein, Georg (2013), The Yoga Tradition: Its History, Literature, Philosophy and Practice
- Horgan, John (2004), Rational Mysticism: Dispatches from the Border Between Science and Spirituality, New York: Houghton Mifflin, ISBN 061844663X
- Kakar, Sudir (2009). Mad and Divine: Spirit and Psyche in the Modern World. Chicago: University of Chicago Press. ISBN 978-0226422879.
- Larson, Stefan (2007), Crazy Yogins During the Early Renaissance Period
- McDaniel, June (1989), The madness of the saints: ecstatic religion in Bengal, Chicago: University of Chicago Press, ISBN 0-226-55723-5
- McLeod, Melvin (2009), The Best Buddhist Writing 2009, Boston: Shambhala Publications, ISBN 978-1590307342
- Phan, Peter C. (2004). Being Religious Interreligiously: Asian Perspectives on Interfaith Dialogue (PDF). Maryknoll: Orbis Books. ISBN 1-57075-565-5. Archived from the original (PDF) on 2011-07-24.
- Pettit, John W. (2013), Mipham's Beacon of Certainty: Illuminating the View of Dzogchen, the Great Perfection, Simon and Schuster
- Ray, Reginald (2005). "Chögyam Trungpa as a Siddha". Recalling Chögyam Trungpa. Fabrice Midal (ed.). Boston: Shambhala Publications. ISBN 1590302079.
- Royster, James E. (1992), "Divine Sabotahe. Review of: "Holy Madness: Spirituality, Crazy-Wise Teachers, And Enlightenment"", Yoga Journal
- Trungpa, Chögyam (2001), Crazy Wisdom, Judith L. Lief, Sherab Chödzin (eds.), Boston: Shambhala Publications, ISBN 0-87773-910-2
- Simmer-Brown, Judith (2001). Dakini's Warm Breath: The Feminine Principle in Tibetan Buddhism. Boston: Shambhala Publications. ISBN 1-57062-720-7.
- Versluis, Arthur (2014), American Gurus: From Transcendentalism to New Age Religion, Oxford University Press
- White, David Gordon (2001), Tantra in Practice, Motilal Banarsidass
