= Dobji Dzong =

Fortress in western Bhutan

Coordinates: 27.26596°N 89.526619°E

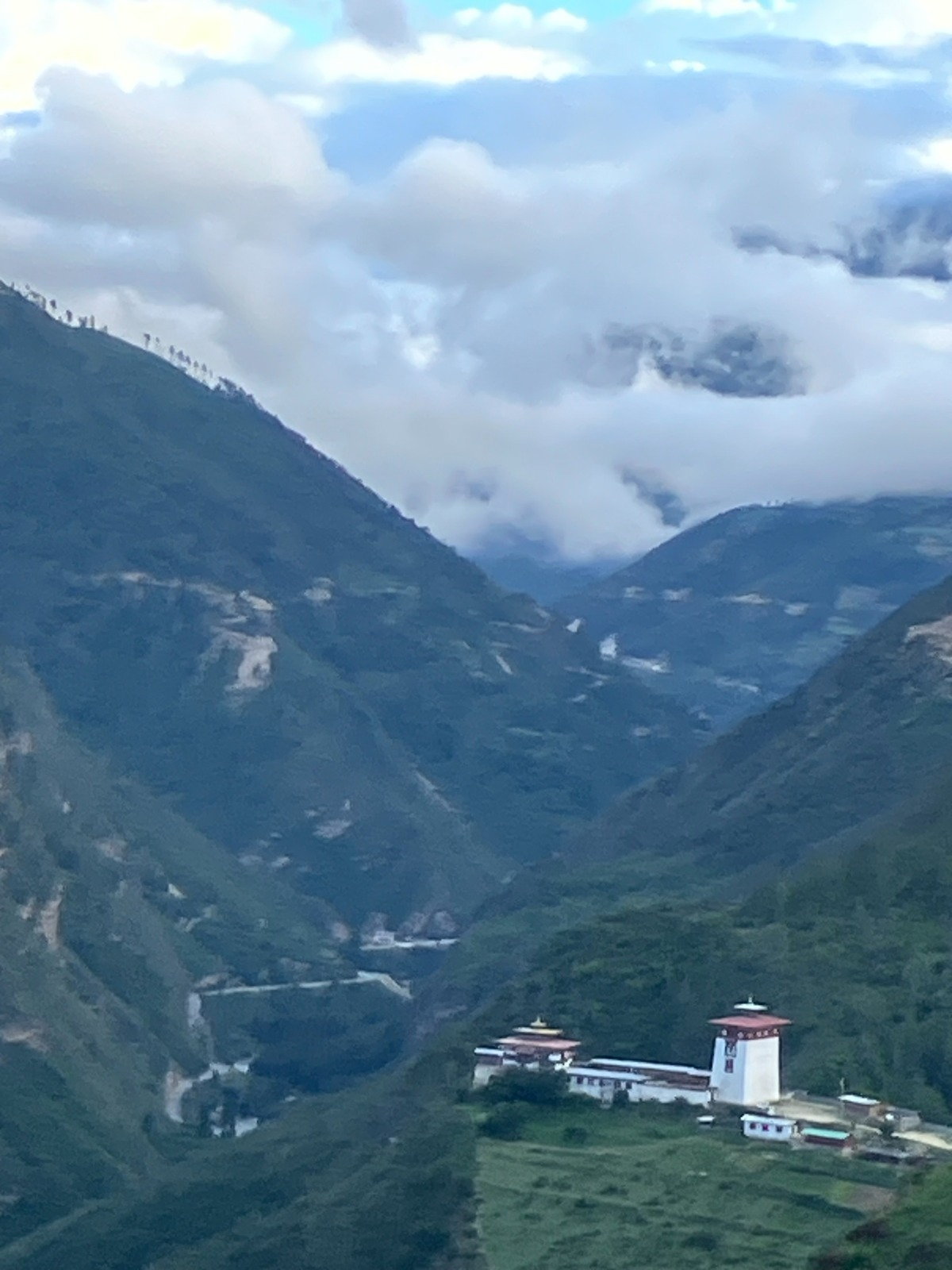
Dobji Dzong sits on a ridge near Chuzom

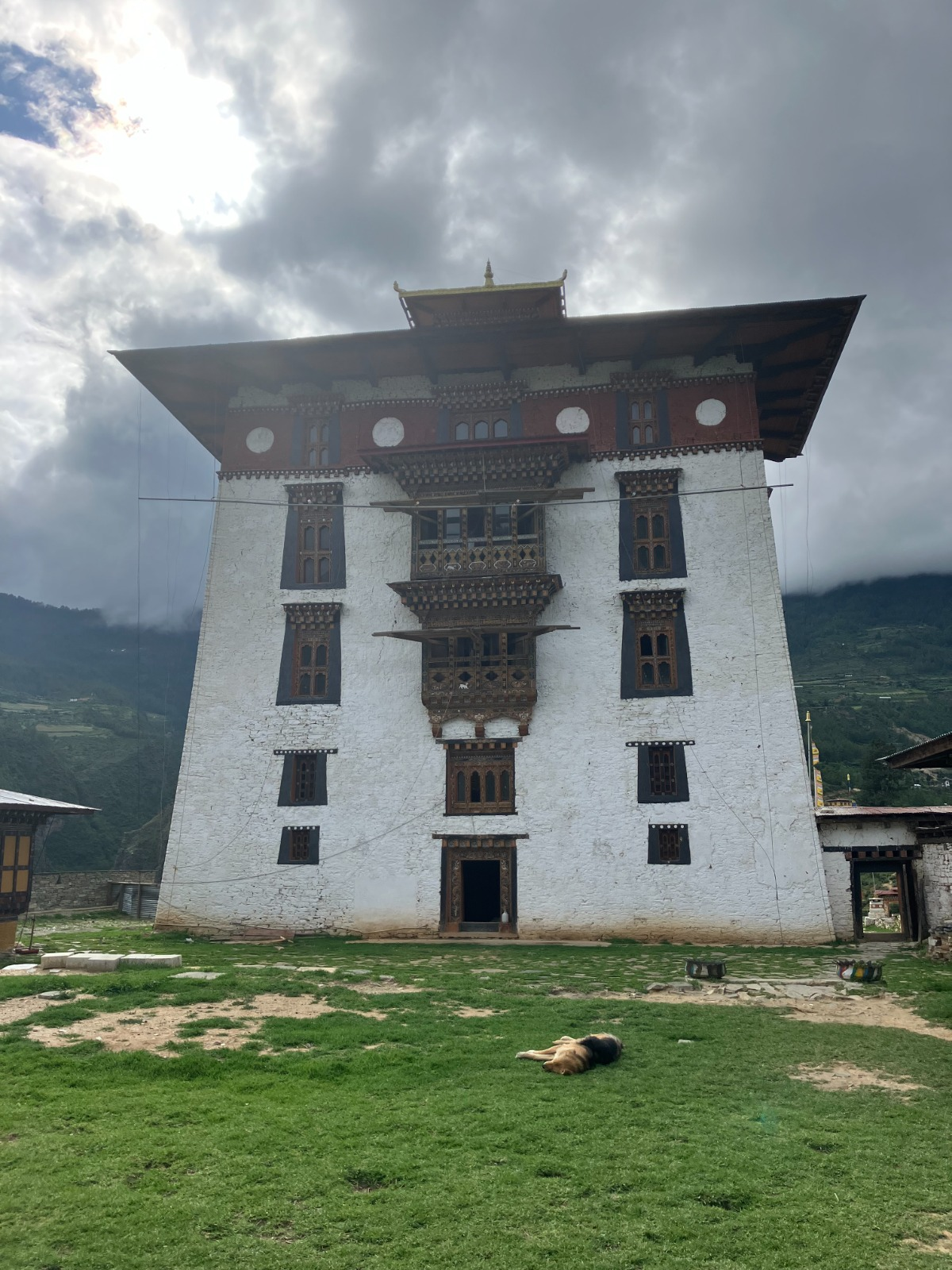
The tower of Dobji Dzong

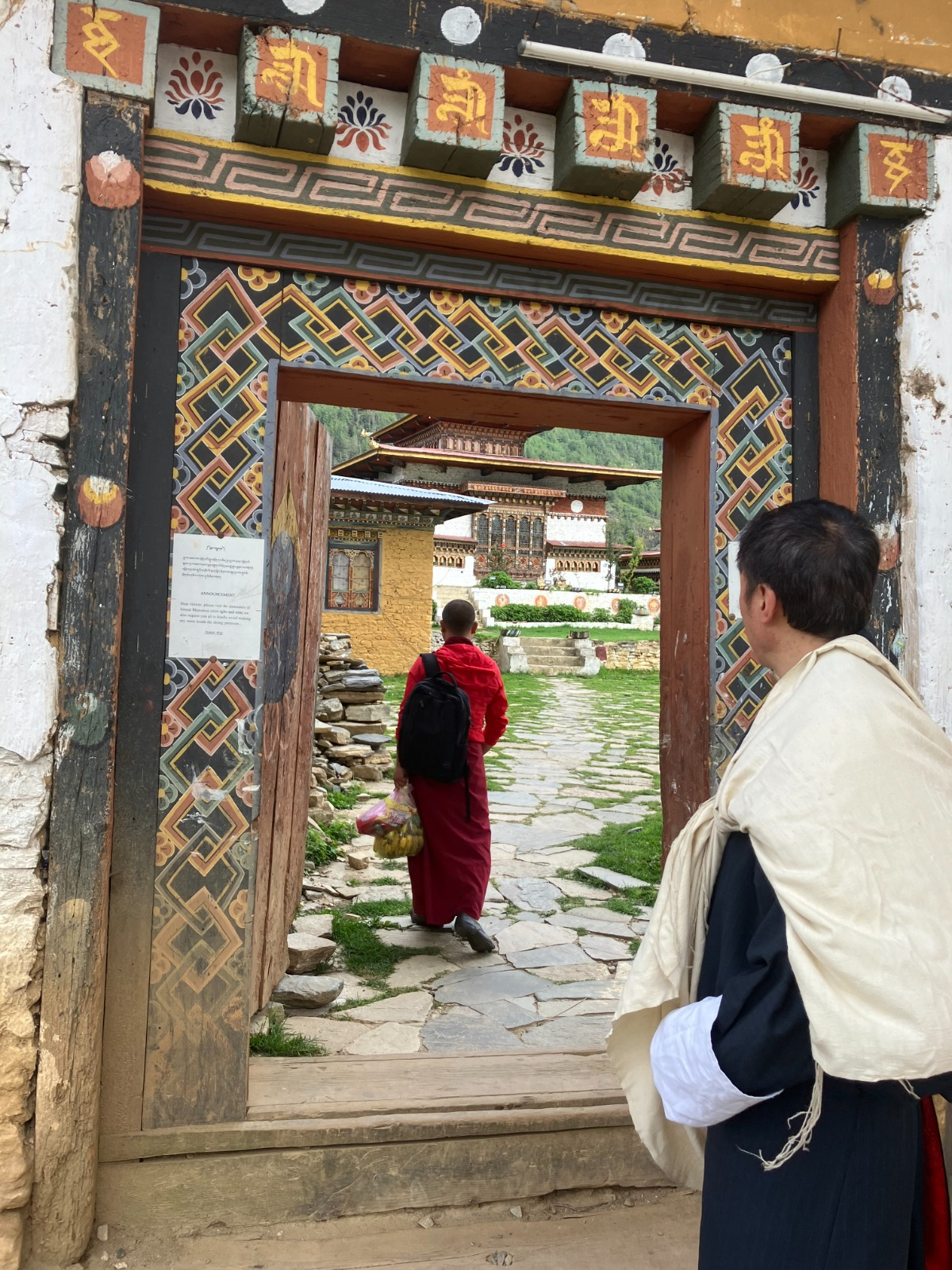
The Milarepa temple inside Dobji Dzong seen from the entrance gate .

Dobji Dzong (Dzongkha: རྡོ་སྦྱིས་རྫོང་།) is a dzong monastery in Bhutan, on a ridge on the national highway from Thimphu to Haa, Paro District, just a few kilometers south of the confluence of the Paro and Thimphu rivers at Chuzom. It is 6,600 feet. Today the dzong houses a monastic school with 35 monks. It was featured in the 2003 film by Bhutanese lama, Travellers and Magicians.

The utse (tower), which previously served as Dogar Penlop's residence, and later as a jail, is undergoing a Nu.36.4 million renovation funded by the King of Bhutan.

The sacred statue of Jetsun Milarepa that is in the shrine, is believed to have been brought from Druk Ralung in Tibet.

== History ==
Dobji Dzong was built in 1531 by Ngawang Chogyal who was the brother of Lam Drukpa Kuenley known as "The Divine Madman". He named the new fortress Dogar Druk Chokhorgang, meaning "Stone Castle of Bhutan". According to legend, he chose the site by tracing an underground stream from the Ralung monastery in Tibet to its outlet at a boulder above the present fortress. This sacred spring, later dubbed the Dobdrek Drub Chu, is believed to have magical healing properties.

The utse is the oldest structure, part of the original grounds. Its survival despite a series of earthquakes is attributed to a terma (revealed treasure) stored on the top floor—a statue that depicts Guru Rinpoche. The image was defaced by a ninth-century Tibetan king, who smashed the statue's left ear with a hammer, prompting it to speak aloud: "I would like to be in service of all sentient beings". After that, the statue was considered a sacred object. The Dobji penlop had it mounted into an amulet that he could wear, though it usually resided in the temple at the top of the tower.
