= Nyönpa =

Type of Tibetan Buddhist yogi

The term nyönpa (Wylie: smyon pa "mad one(s)"; Sanskrit avadhūta) may refer to a group of Tibetan Buddhist yogis or a single individual belonging to this group. They are mainly known for their unorthodox approach and philosophical foundation known as "tulshuk chöpa." Nyönpas are a group of yogis who break away from traditional norms, emphasizing spontaneity and intuition over rigid rules.

Nyönpa are characterized by a nomadic lifestyle, unique attire, and practices otherwise rejected by formal orders such as singing, dancing, and even sexual relations. Noteworthy historical figures include monk Drukpa Kunley and the second Dalai Lama Gendün Gyatso. Women were also counted among nyönpa, such as Sönam Peldren or the "Headless Sisters" Mekhala and Kanakhala. The nyönpa tradition, referred to as The Practice of Observance, is founded in the religious philosophy of tulshuk chöpa.

== Spiritual practices ==
Recent scholarship has helped to illuminate many distinguishing features of the religious practices the nyönpa; these practices are sometimes referred to in the literature as The Practice of Observance. The Practice of Observance takes as its foundation the philosophy of tulshuk or chöpa or even tulshuk chöpa. This religious philosophy is the common thread in the following spiritual practices of the nyönpa:

The nyönpa is essentially a free spirit who follows the rule of spontaneity and intuition, not subject to any external book of rules....he is one dedicated to renunciation and the path of enlightenment who does not fit within the disciplines and practises of the formal orders.

- wandering homeless and taking on a new style of dress and a new mental attitude towards the world;
- consuming substances considered impure;
- drinking alcohol and eating meat;
- singing and dancing;
- behaving fearlessly;
- engaging in sexual relations.

None of the practises listed above should be taken as mandatory.

Practices that a nyönpa may avoid include:

- reading spiritual texts;
- reciting prayers in the usual ways.

Some nyönpa were also famous for the practice of chöd.

== Notable examples ==
There are some recorded historical descriptions of those exhibiting the behavior and spiritual practice of the nyönpa in both Tibet and India including:

- Drukpa Kunley
- Gendün Gyatso, the Second Dalai Lama
- Kalapa, the "Handsome Madman", one of the 84 Mahasiddas
- Mekhala and Kankhala, often called the "Two Headless Sisters", also part of the group of the 84 Mahasiddas
- Thang Tong Gyalpo
- Tsangnyön Heruka
- Ü Nyön Kunga Zangpo
- Milarepa

== Women and the path ==
There is evidence that women also took inspiration from the spiritual practices and ways of conduct of the nyönpa.

The most famous Tibetan woman exhibiting signs of the path of the nyönpa would be the Tibetan female saint Sönam Peldren who probably lived in the 14th century. Sönam Peldren was eventually understood as an emanation of Vajravārāhī in the female tulku incarnation lineage of the Samding Dorje Phagmo.

Before this, in India, there were three women in the grouping of the 84 Mahasidda whose spiritual behavior would indicate that they practiced according to this spiritual path. They are Lakṣmīṅkarā, the "Crazy Princess", and the "Two Headless Sisters" Mekhala and Kanakhala.

== See also ==
- Divine madness – Behavior linked to spiritual pursuits
- Ikkyū – Japanese Zen Buddhist monk (1394–1481)
- Tachikawa-ryū – Japanese school of esoteric Buddhism
