= Entasis =

Applying convex curvature to a surface in architecture

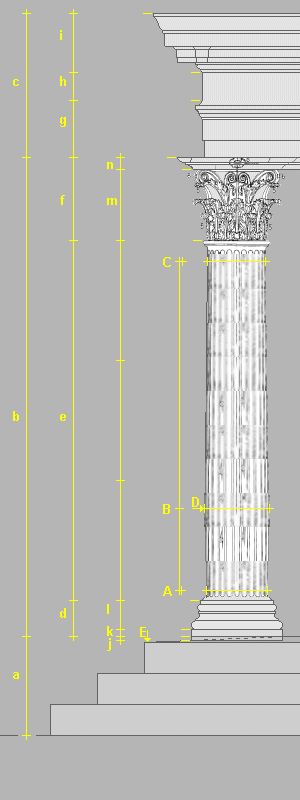
Diagram of a Corinthian column showing a visible entasis bulge at "D"

In architecture, entasis is the application of a convex curve to a surface for aesthetic purposes, or increasing strength. Its best-known use is in certain orders of Classical columns that diminish in a very gentle curve, rather than in a straight line as they narrow going upward. The human eye would allegedly perceive that the middle of the column was diminishing in a concave curve halfway up the column, and entasis corrects this.

== Etymology ==
The word we apply to the design principle is used by the Roman architect and engineer Vitruvius, and derives from the Greek word έντείνω (enteino), "to stretch or strain tight". Creating the illusion of greater strength or perception of height may have been an objective in the application of entasis.

== Examples ==
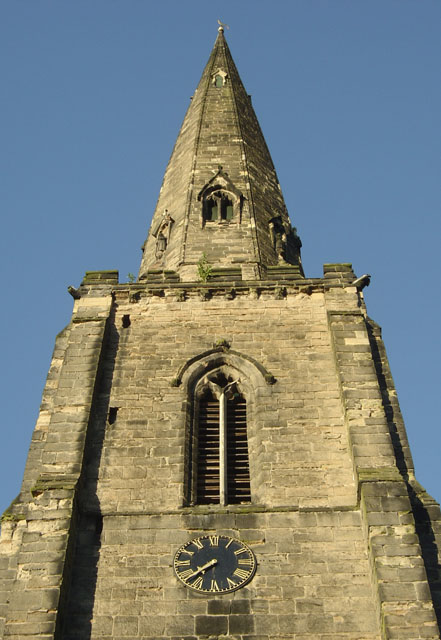
Early fourteenth-century steeple of All Hallows' parish church, Gedling, Nottinghamshire, England, showing entasis of the spire

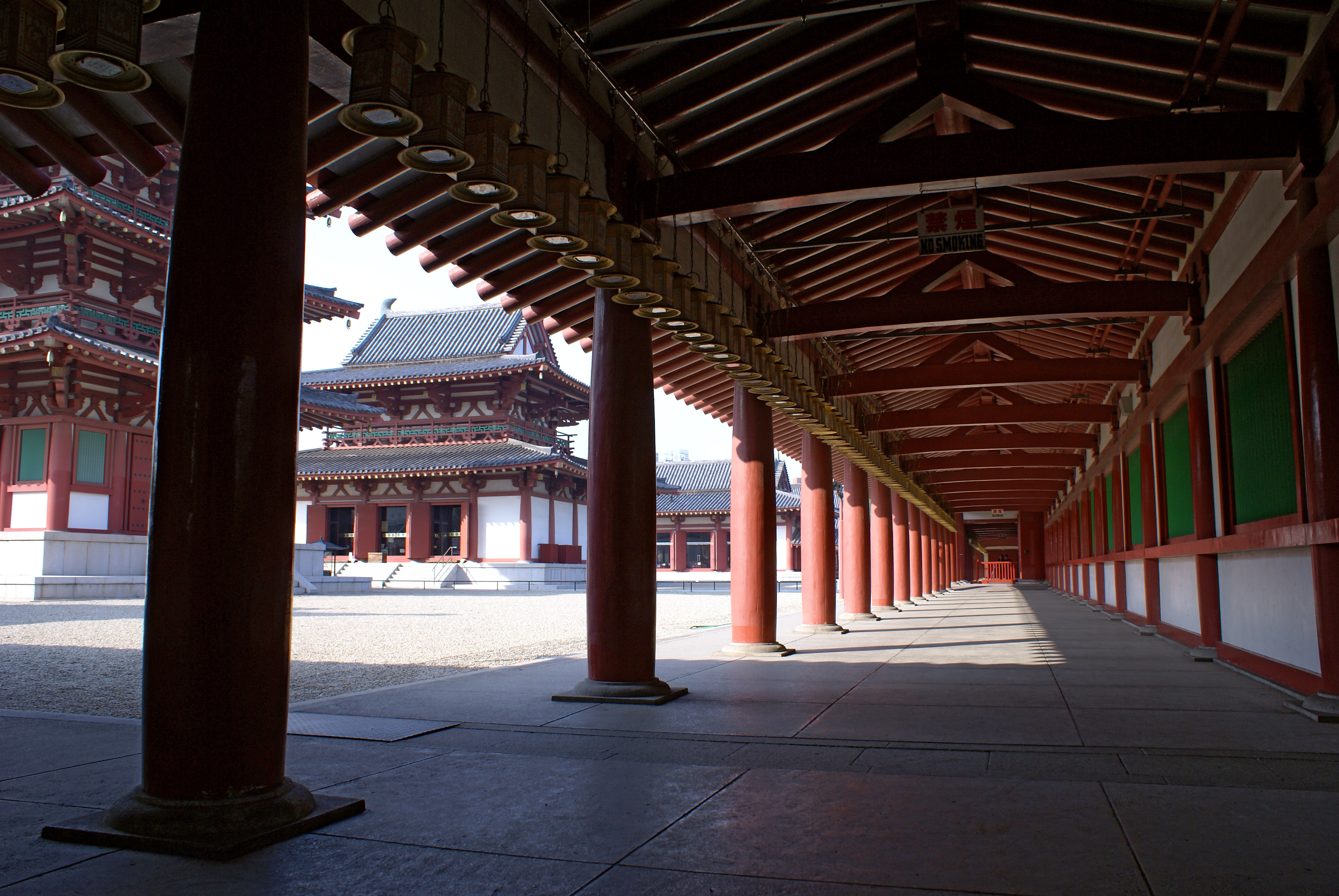
Entasis columns at Shitennō-ji, Japan

Examples of this design principle may be found in cultures throughout the world, from ancient times to contemporary architecture. The first use of entasis is probably in the Later Temple of Aphaia at Aigina, in the 490s BC.

It may be observed among Classical period Greek column designs, for example, in the Doric order temples in Segesta, Selinus, Agrigento, and Paestum.

It was used less frequently in Hellenistic and Roman period architecture. The Roman temples built during these periods were sometimes higher than those of the Greeks, with longer and thinner columns.

Chinese carpenters of the Song Dynasty followed designs in the AD 1103 Yingzao Fashi (Treatise on Architectural Methods or State Building Standards) that specified straight columns or those with an entasis on the upper third of the shaft.

Noted architects, such as the Renaissance master Andrea Palladio, also used entasis in the designs of their buildings.

Entasis was often a feature of Inca walls and doorways to counteract the optical illusion that would make the openings appear narrower in their middles.

== Concave curves ==
The opposite effect, applying concave curves in order to narrow surfaces that otherwise would appear to bulge, is also found in architecture, as in the sloping or battered walls of some Tibetan and Bhutanese monasteries and fortresses. The lower parts of such walls, approximately one third, have a slight concave or inward curve, while the higher parts retain an even slope, offsetting the outwardly bulging illusion created by a straight sloping wall. An example in Bhutan is the Dobji Dzong. When some collapsed walls of the Punakha Dzong were rebuilt, around 1996, this asymmetry was not used.

=== In calligraphy ===
In calligraphy and typography entasis refers to the use of a concave curve to thin — rather than widen — the waist of a stroke or character. In calligraphy this is achieved either through a slight heightening of the pen or brush angle and/or by an increase in the speed of the stroke as it goes into a straight. Visually it is reminiscent of the structure of a bone and a stroke is seen as stronger for it. Entasis in a stroke is intended to counter the illusion a stroke with perfectly straight sides has of bulging slightly.

== Origin in Greek columns ==
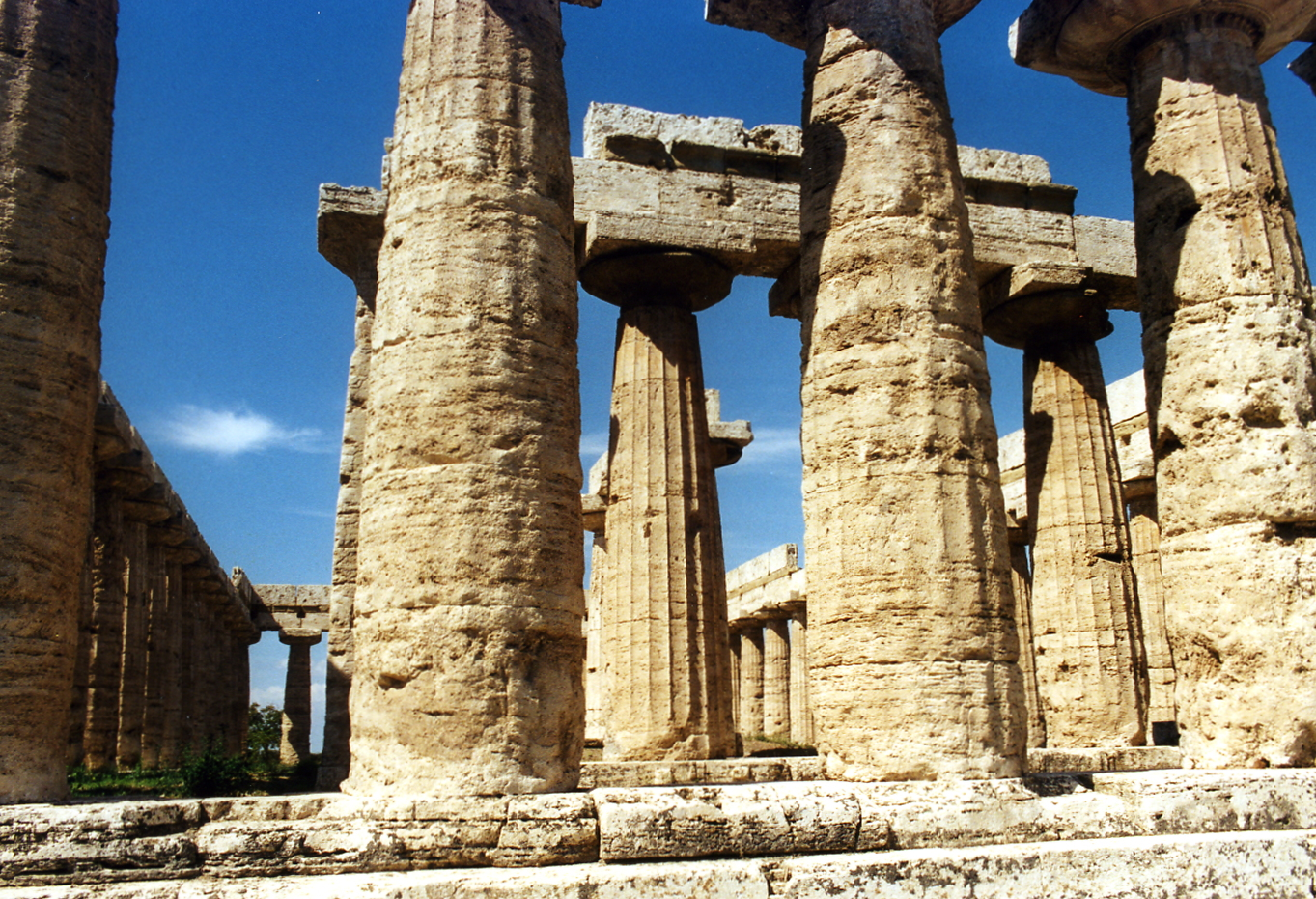
Entasis in columns at the first Hera temple at Paestum, erroneously called a 'basilica' by eighteenth century authors

No record of the rationale for using entasis in columns by Classical builders has yet been discovered. As a result, there has been extensive conjecture over its purpose.

An early view, often articulated and still widespread, espoused by Hero of Alexandria, is that entasis corrects the optical illusion of concavity in the columns that the fallible human eye would create if the correction were not made. However, modern psychological research suggests that people do not actually experience any illusion that could be compensated by this design.

External videos
- smARThistory – Ancient Greek Temples at Paestum, Italy

Some descriptions of entasis state simply that the technique was an enhancement applied to the more primitive conical columns to make them appear more substantial. Other descriptions argue that the technique emphasizes the substantiality of, not the columns, but rather, of some other part or of the building while being viewed as a whole. Yale architectural historian Vincent Scully argues that entasis emphasizes the weight of the roof of a building by making the building columns appear to bulge under the pressure distributed among them. Danish architect Steen Eiler Rasmussen believed that the effect represented strength by imitating the swelling of a strained muscle, a theory that accords well with the etymology of the word, from the Greek meaning "to strain".

It also has been argued that a "stunted cycloid" column that bulges in the middle is stronger structurally than is a column whose diameter changes according to a linear progression, therefore, having a sound engineering purpose. Because their discussion of the application of the principle has never been discovered, it is unknown, however, whether the early Greeks knew this.

== Mathematics of Entasis in the Parthenon ==
Oxford mathematics professor Alain Goriely has argued that the optical corrections in the parthenon "are either nonsense or practically imperceptible". The perpetuation of the "entasis myth" could be due to a belief that the culture of ancient greece was supremely knowledgeable, that the curved stylobate could help prevent rainwater from accumulating, and that entasis could simply be aesthetically pleasing rather than illusion correcting.

== Literature ==
- Thomä, Walter (1915). Written at Universität Heidelberg. Die Schwellung der Säule (Entasis) bei den Architekturtheoretikern bis in das XVIII. Jahrhundert [The Swelling of the Column (Entasis) among Architectural Theorists up to the 18th Century] (PhD thesis) (in German). Dresden: Buchdruckere der Wilhelm und Bertha v. Baensch Stiftung. doi:10.11588/diglit.74900.

== See also ==
- Glossary of architecture
