= Phallus paintings in Bhutan =

Esoteric symbols in Bhutan

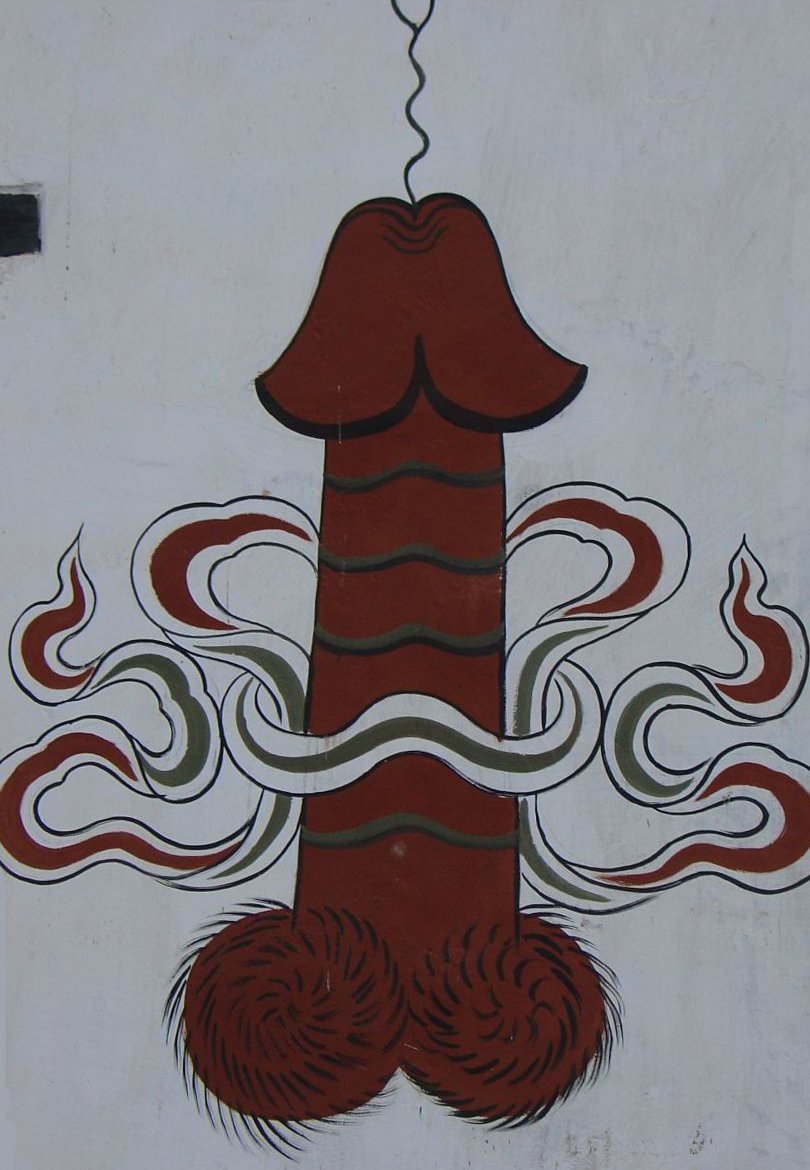
Phallus symbols depicted on houses in Bhutan

Phallus paintings in Bhutan are esoteric symbols, which have their origins in the Chimi Lhakhang monastery near Punakha, the former capital of Bhutan. The village monastery was built in honour of Lama Drukpa Kunley who lived at the turn of the 16th century and who was popularly known as the "Mad Saint" (nyönpa) or “Divine Madman” for his unorthodox ways of teaching, which amounted to being bizarre and shocking. These explicit paintings have become embarrassing to many of the country's urbanites, and this form of folk culture is informally discouraged in urban centers as modern Abrahamic cultural norms of shaming the human body and sexuality have spread in Bhutan's urban centers.

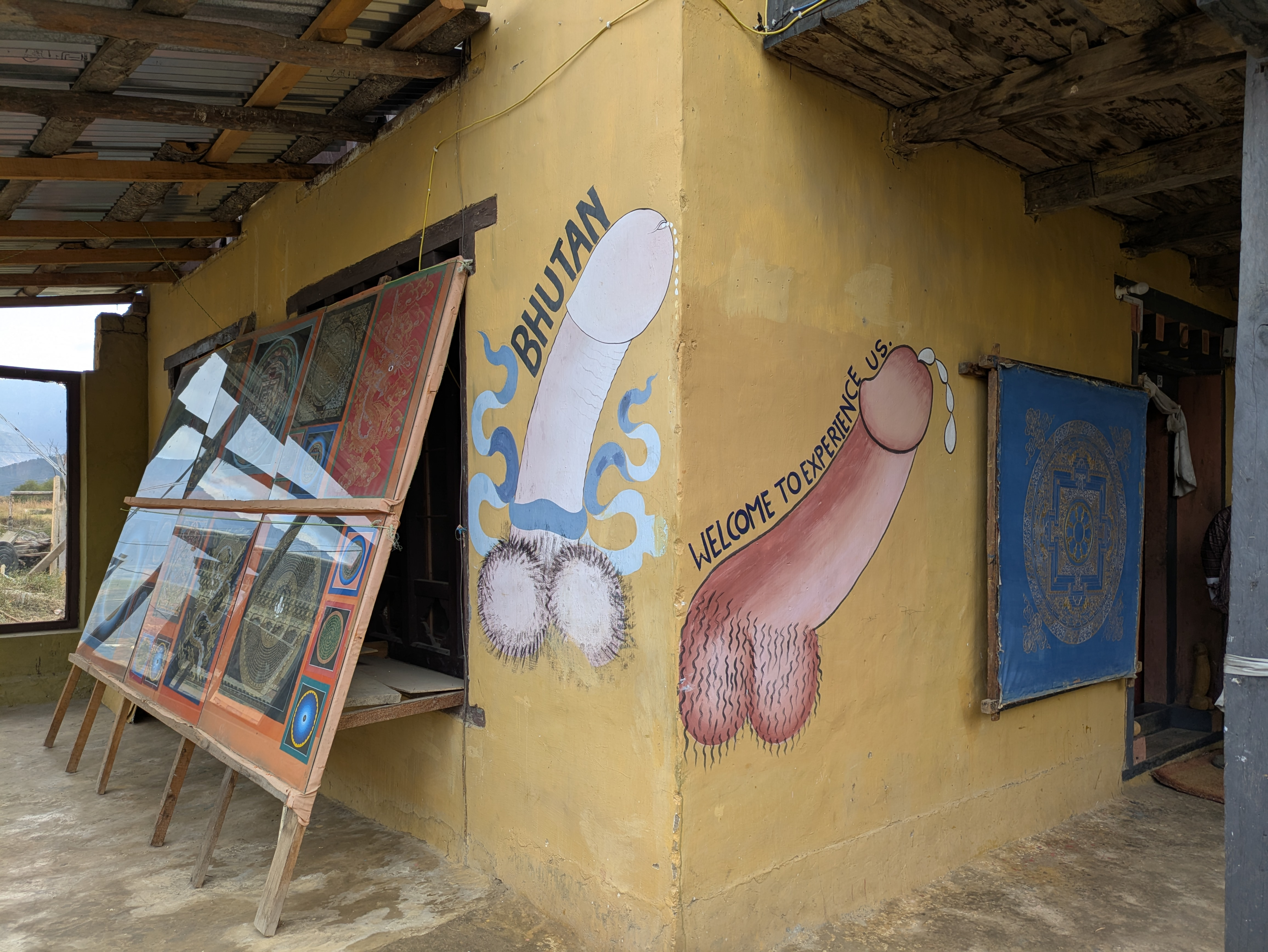
Paintings of phalluses on walls in Bhutan, where it is a holy symbol.

However, phallus paintings can still be seen on the walls of houses and buildings throughout Bhutan, particularly in villages, and are credited as Kunley's creations. Traditionally symbols of an erect penis in Bhutan have been intended to drive away the evil eye and malicious gossip. The phallic symbols are generally not depicted in community temples and dzongs, which are places of worship where lamas or Buddhist monks and nuns who have adopted celibate lifestyles live. However, rural and ordinary houses continue to display them.

While the history of use of phallus symbols is generally traced to Drukpa Kunley, studies carried out at the Center of Bhutan Studies (CBS) have inferred that the phallus was an integral part of the early ethnic religion associated with Bon that existed in Bhutan before Buddhism became the state religion. In Bon, the phallus was integral to all rituals. Dasho Lam Sanga, a former principal of the Institute of Language and Culture Studies (ILCS), while acknowledging that there are no written documents regarding the subject, refers to the oral history: "But the worship of the phallus was believed to be in practice even before the arrival of Guru Rinpoche and Shabdrung Ngawang Namgyal ... What we know about it is what we heard from our forefathers."

== History ==
The often mentioned origin of the symbolic phallus is as a legacy of the popular Bhutanese saint Drukpa Kunley (1455–1529). Kunley migrated from Tibet, was trained in Ralung Monastery in Tibet, and belonged to the period of Pema Lingpa and was his disciple. He was a crazy saint who extensively travelled in Bhutan, who was fond of women and wine, and adopted blasphemous and unorthodox ways of teaching Buddhism. His sexual exploits included his hosts and promoters. He was utterly devoid of all social conventions and called himself the "Madman from Kyishodruk."

Drukpa Kunley's intention was to shock the clergy, who were uppity and prudish in their behaviour and teachings of Buddhism. However, his ways appealed to lay practitioners. It was he who propagated the legend of painting phalluses on walls and flying hanging phalluses from roof tops of houses to drive away evil spirits and subdue demonesses. He is, therefore, also called the "fertility saint", as the monastery he built, Chimi Lhakhang, is visited by not only Bhutanese women but also people from the United States and Japan.

Kunley's organ, as painted, is called the "Thunderbolt of Flaming Wisdom" as it unnerved demons and demonesses and subdued them. It is also said that he is "perhaps the only saint in the religions of the world who is almost exclusively identified with phallus and its creative power". It is for this reason that his phallus, as a symbol, is depicted in paintings on the walls of the houses, and he is shown in thangka paintings holding a "wooden stick with penis head".

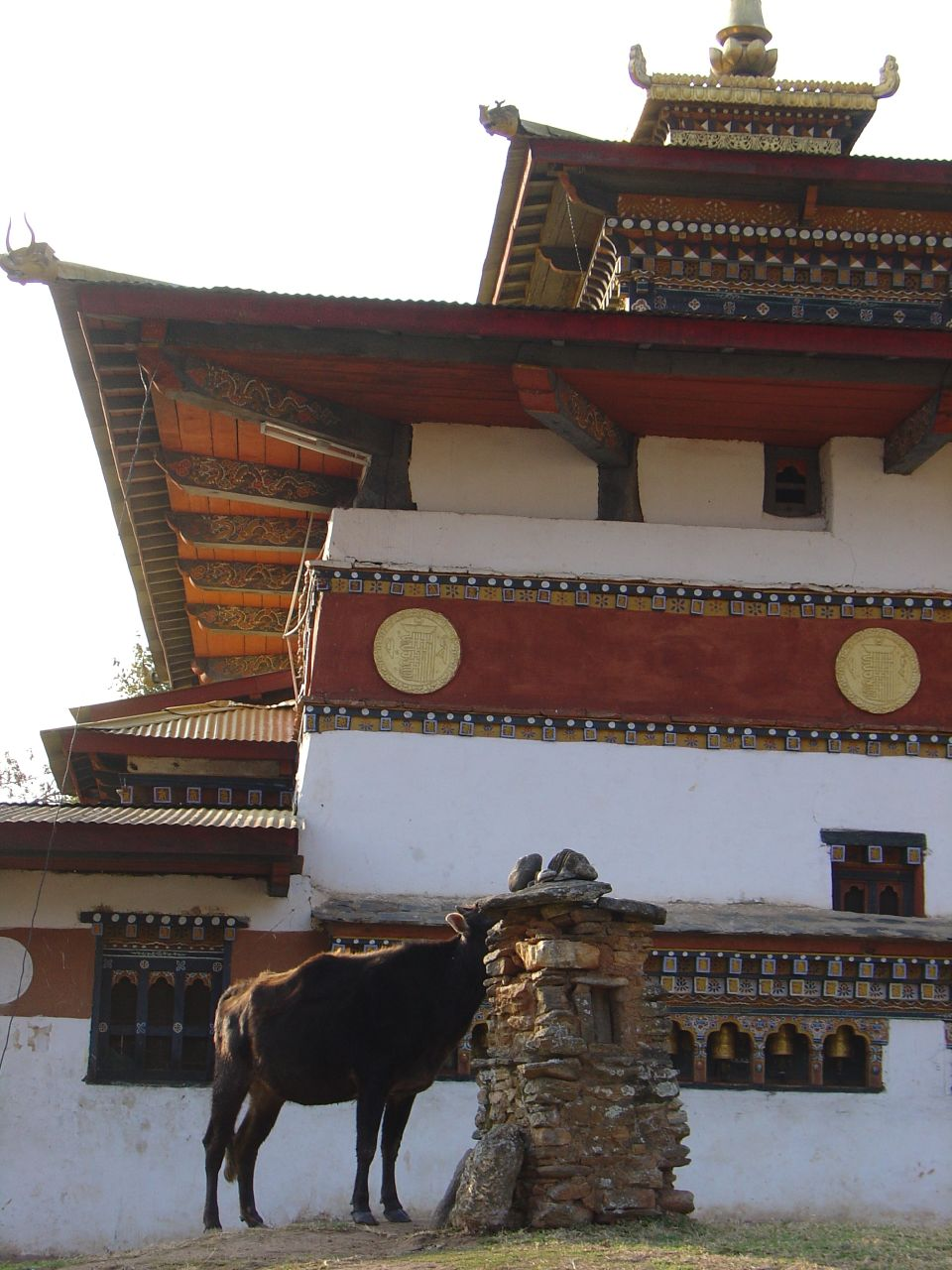
Chimi Lhakhang, established by Drukpa Kunley and known for its wooden phalluses.

The nyönpa lived in a place known as Lobesa close to Chimi Lhakhang to drive away demonesses and protect the local people. According to the legend, he used to hit the evil forces with his penis (or cohabited with them) and turn them into protective deities. Chimi Lhakhang was built in the mad saint's honour by his cousin on a hillock (this hillock was called by Kunley a "woman's breast") in a valley for the good deeds done to his people by subduing the evil forces and demonesses with his "magic thunderbolt of wisdom". It was built in 1499 with a square plan and a golden spire. It is approached from the Yowakha village, and all the houses on the way are painted with phallic symbols.

The monastery now houses several wooden phalluses including a silver-handled phallus (the "Lama's Thunderbolt"), which the mad saint is supposed to have brought from Tibet. This is now frequently used by the current lama of the monastery to hit women on the head as a blessing to beget children. The monastery is also enshrined with a statue of Lama Kunley with his pet dog Sachi. Images of Ngawang Namgyal, Gautama Buddha and Avalokiteśvara are also deified in the monastery. Women come to the monastery seeking blessings of children by getting hit on the head by the presiding lama with wooden and bone phalluses. The name of the yet-to-be-born child is also chosen by picking bamboo slips placed in the altar inscribed with names of boys and girls. It is also said that the small stupa at the altar was made by Kunley himself.

It is also argued by social science researchers that the phallus is a representation of "Worldly illusion of desires", and it is said that as a symbol of power and fertility of the animists of the Bön religion, the phallus's representation got enmeshed with Buddhism in Bhutan. Similar phallic depictions can be found in Thailand, Bali, and in other cultures.

=== Anecdotes and practices ===
Several anecdotes are told of the zany ways of Drukpa Kunley. It is said that on a particular occasion he was gifted a sacred thread to put around his neck. However, he shocked the people by saying that he would tie the thread around his penis with the fond hope that it would bring him "luck with the ladies".

Among some communities in eastern Bhutan, every year during a particular period, phalluses are worshipped with flowers, red-colored ara and milk, in an effort to seek protection from the evil spirits. In central Bhutan, a wooden phallus is immersed in the cups before the drinks are offered to the guests. Some phalluses, especially in rural Bhutan, are endowed with comic eyes.

The phallus painting is also termed as an institutionalised graffiti. It is seen painted in different designs, and an unusual design seen is one with a dragon riding the phallus. One common feature noticed is that the phallus is always seen ejaculating.

== Symbolism ==
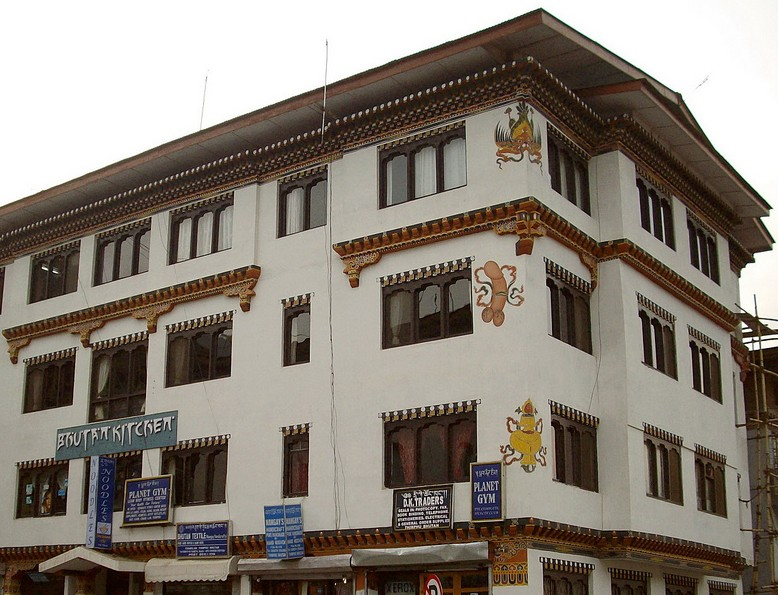
Phallic painting on the walls of the Bhutan Kitchen restaurant in Thimphu.

The belief that such a symbol brings good luck and drives away evil spirits is so much ingrained in the psyche of the common populace in Bhutan that the symbols are routinely painted outside walls of the new houses and even painted on number plates of trucks. The carved wooden phalluses are hung (sometimes crossed by a design of sword or dagger) outside, on the eaves of the new homes, at the four corners.

The wooden phalluses are also driven in the agricultural fields as a kind of scarecrow, when the crops start sprouting. The Atsaras (masked clowns) also decorate their headgear with phallus painted cloth, during the popular Tsechu festival held every year in different monasteries throughout Bhutan. These clowns also dance with their holy whips and wooden phalluses. On a road drive from Paro airport to Thimphu these explicit paintings of phalluses are a common sight on “white-washed walls of homes, shops and eateries.”

In the Chimi Lhakhang monastery, the shrine dedicated to Drukpa Kunley, several wooden penises are seen being used to bless people who visit the monastery on pilgrimage seeking blessings to bear a child or for welfare of their children. The glaringly displayed phallus in the monastery is a brown wooden piece with a silver handle, a religious relic considered to possess divine powers and hence used for blessing the spiritually oriented people. It is also said to prevent quarrels among family members in the houses which are painted with these symbols.

== House warming ritual ==
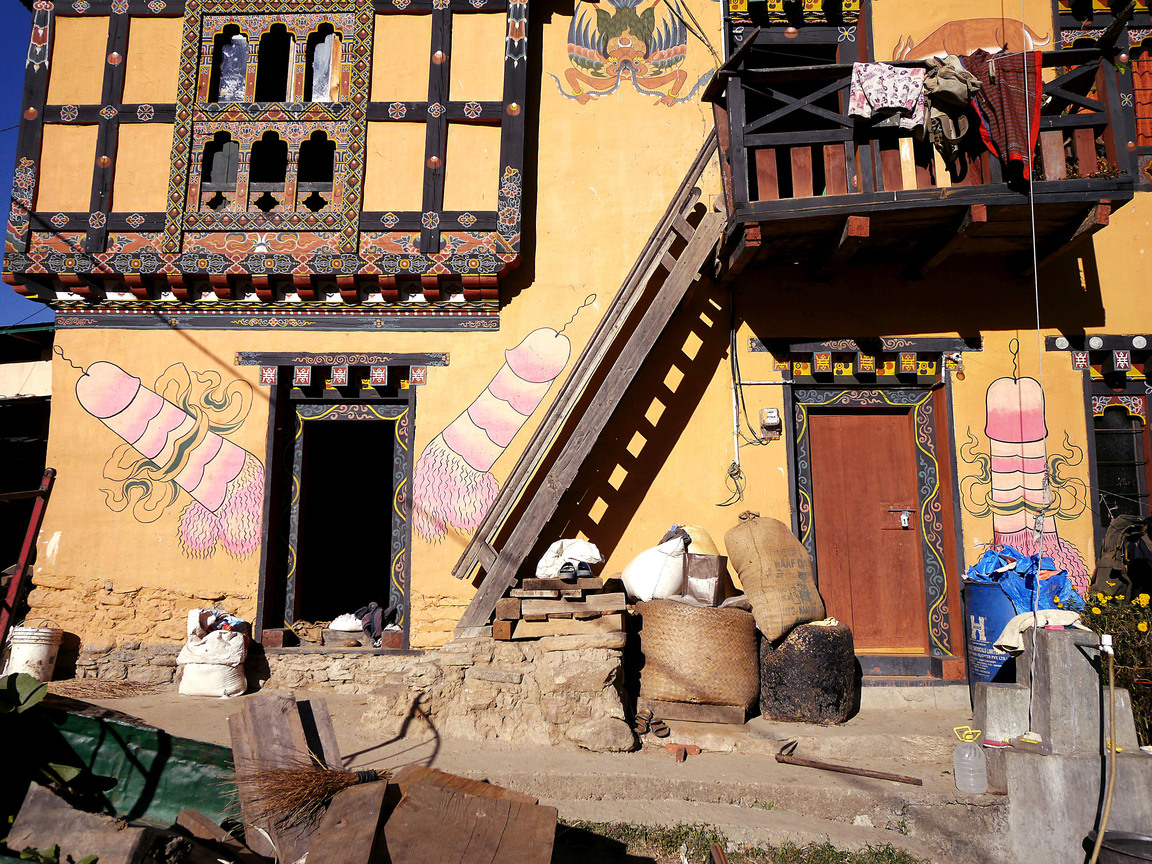
Village next to Fertility Temple Chimi Lhakhang where phalluses are painted on walls

As part of house warming ceremony of new houses, a traditional ritual involves erecting the phallus symbols at the four corners of the eaves of the house and one inside the house. A basket filled with carved wooden phalluses is raised to the roof of the house to fix them at the four cardinal corners. Groups of both men and women get hired by the owner of the house in raising the basket to the roof.

While the men pull the basket up with a rope tied securely from the roof, women try to pull it down; during this process, ribald phallic songs are sung and with every pull the people watching shout "laso". A mock exercise is enacted by the men as if they have failed to lift the basket and the basket is dropped to the ground. The intention is to get free alcoholic drinks from the owner of the house to "energize" the men. Following the drinking, the men finally rise the basket to the roof and fix the phalluses at the four corners of the roof at the eve ends.

The phalluses are also tied with a dagger (redi) and painted in five different colours; the colours are said to be significators of five divine expressions: "White dagger representing peace, purity, and harmony, a red coloured dagger representing wealth and power is placed on the west, the yellow dagger representing prosperity is placed on the south, and on the north is placed the green dagger representing protection. The fifth dagger placed inside the house is usually blue in colour and symbolises wisdom." The popular belief in fixing these symbols is that it wards off evil spirits, and not as a fertility symbol.

== See also ==
- Bhutanese art
- Lingam
- Phallic architecture
- Phallus
- Phallic graffiti
