= Avadhuta =

Type of mystic or saint who acts without consideration for standard social etiquette

Avadhūta (IAST avadhūta, written as अवधूत) is a Sanskrit term from the root 'to shake' (see V. S. Apte and Monier-Williams) that, among its many uses, in some Indian religions indicates a type of mystic or saint who is beyond egoic-consciousness, duality and common worldly concerns and acts without consideration for standard social etiquette. Avadhūta is a Jivanmukta who gives his insight to others and teaches them about his realisation of the true nature of the ultimate reality (Brahman 'ब्रह्म' - not to be confused with Brahmin) and self (Ātman) and takes the role of a guru to show the path of moksha to others. Some Avadhūta also achieve the title of Paramahamsa.

Similar figures (colloquially called 'mad/crazy monks') are also known in Buddhist traditions, such as the medieval Zen monk Ikkyū, and the 20th-century Tibetan tulku Chögyam Trungpa Rinpoche. In Tibetan Buddhism the equivalent type is called a nyönpa (Wylie: smyon pa).

== Types ==
Feuerstein frames how the term avadhūta came to be associated with the mad or eccentric holiness or 'crazy wisdom' of some antinomian paramahamsa who were often 'skyclad' or 'naked' (Sanskrit: digambara):

The appellation "avadhūta", more than any other, came to be associated with the apparently crazy modes of behaviour of some paramahamsas, who dramatize the reversal of social norms, a behaviour characteristic of their spontaneous lifestyle. Their frequent nakedness is perhaps the most symbolic expression of this reversal.

=== Sacrifice ===
Sarat Chandra Das et al. equate Chöd practitioners (Tibetan: གཅོད་པ, Wylie: chod pa) as a type of avadhūta:

ཀུ་སུ་ལུ་པ ku-su-lu-pa is a word of Tantrik mysticism, its proper Tibetan equivalent being གཅོད་པ, the art of exorcism. The mystic Tantrik rites of the Avadhauts, called Avadhūtipa in Tibet, exist in India.

The rites of Chöd differ between lineages but essentially there is an offering of their body as food, a blessing to demons and other entities to whom this kind of offering may be of benefit, in a feast called the ganachakra. This sādhanā (practice) is common to another denizen of the charnel ground, Dattātreya the avadhūta, to whom has been attributed the nondualist medieval song, the Avadhūta Gītā. Dattātreya was a founding guru (ādiguru) of the Aghori according to Barrett:

Lord Dattatreya, an antinomian form of Shiva closely associated with the cremation ground, who appeared to Baba Kina Ram atop Girnar Mountain in Gujarat. Considered to be the adi guru (ancient spiritual teacher) and founding deity of Aghor, Lord Dattatreya offered his own flesh to the young ascetic as prasād (a kind of blessing), conferring upon him the power of clairvoyance and establishing a guru-disciple relationship between them.

=== Mahānirvāṇatantram ===
John Woodroffe, in his translation of the Mahanirvana tantra from the original Sanskrit into English under the pen name "Arthur Avalon", may be the introduction of the archetype of "avadhūta" to the English-reading public, as none of the avadhūta upanishads were translated amongst the collections of minor upanishads such as the Thirty Minor Upanishads. The Mahānirvāṇa tantra is an example of a nondualist tantra, and the translation of this work had a profound impact on the Indologists of the early-to mid-20th century. The work mentions four kinds of avadhūta.

=== Brahmanirvāṇatantram ===
The Brahmanirvantantra describes how to identify the avadhuts of the following types:

1. Brahmāvadhūta : An avadhuta from birth who appears in any class of society. Completely indifferent to the world or worldly matters.
2. Shaivāvadhūta : Avadhutas who have taken to the renounced order of life (sannyasa), often with unkempt long hair (jata), or who dress in the manner of Shaivites and spend almost all of their time in trance (samadhi), or meditation.
3. Vīrāvadhūta : This person looks like a sadhu who has put red colored sandal paste on his body and wears saffron clothes. His hair is very well grown and is normally furling in the wind. They wear Hindu prayer beads made of Rudraksha, or of bones. They hold a wooden stick in their hand and additionally they always have a parashu (ritual ax) or damaru (small drum) with them.
4. Kulāvadhūta : These people are supposed to have taken initiation from the Kaula sampradaya or are adepts in Kundalini Tantra. It is supposedly very difficult to recognize these people, as they do not wear any outward signs designating them as avadhutas. The speciality of these people is that they remain and live like ordinary people do. They can show themselves in the form of kings, warriors, householders or beggars.

== Relationship with the Natha Sampradaya ==
The Natha Sampradaya is a form of avadhūta panthan. In this sampradaya, Guru and yoga are of extreme importance. The important book for the Nath is the Avadhuta Gita. Gorakshanath is considered the topmost form of the avadhuta-state.

== Books ==
- Siddha Siddhanta Paddhati is a very early extant hatha yoga Sanskrit text attributed to Gorakshanath by the indigenous tradition, as Georg Feuerstein relates:

One of the earliest hatha yoga scriptures, the Siddha Siddhanta Paddhati, contains many verses that describe the avadhūta. One stanza (VI.20) in particular refers to his chameleon-like capacity to animate any character or role. At times, it is said, he behaves like a worldling or even a king, at other times like an ascetic or naked renunciant."

- Jayachamarajendra Wadiyar's Avadhoota: Reason & Reverence, Indian Institute of World Culture, Bangalore, 1958.
- The Avadhūtaka Upaniṣad is the 79th book of the Muktikā canon of Upaniṣads. It is a sannyāsa upaniṣad associated with the Black Yajurveda (कृष्णयजुर्वेद).
- According to the International Nath Order of the Nath sampradāya, the Avadhūta Gītā is a text of Advaita Vedānta sung by Dattātreya and recorded by his disciples Svāmī and Kārtika.

== See also ==
- Divine madness
- Nityananda
