= Chimi Lhakhang =

Buddhist monastery in Punakha, Bhutan

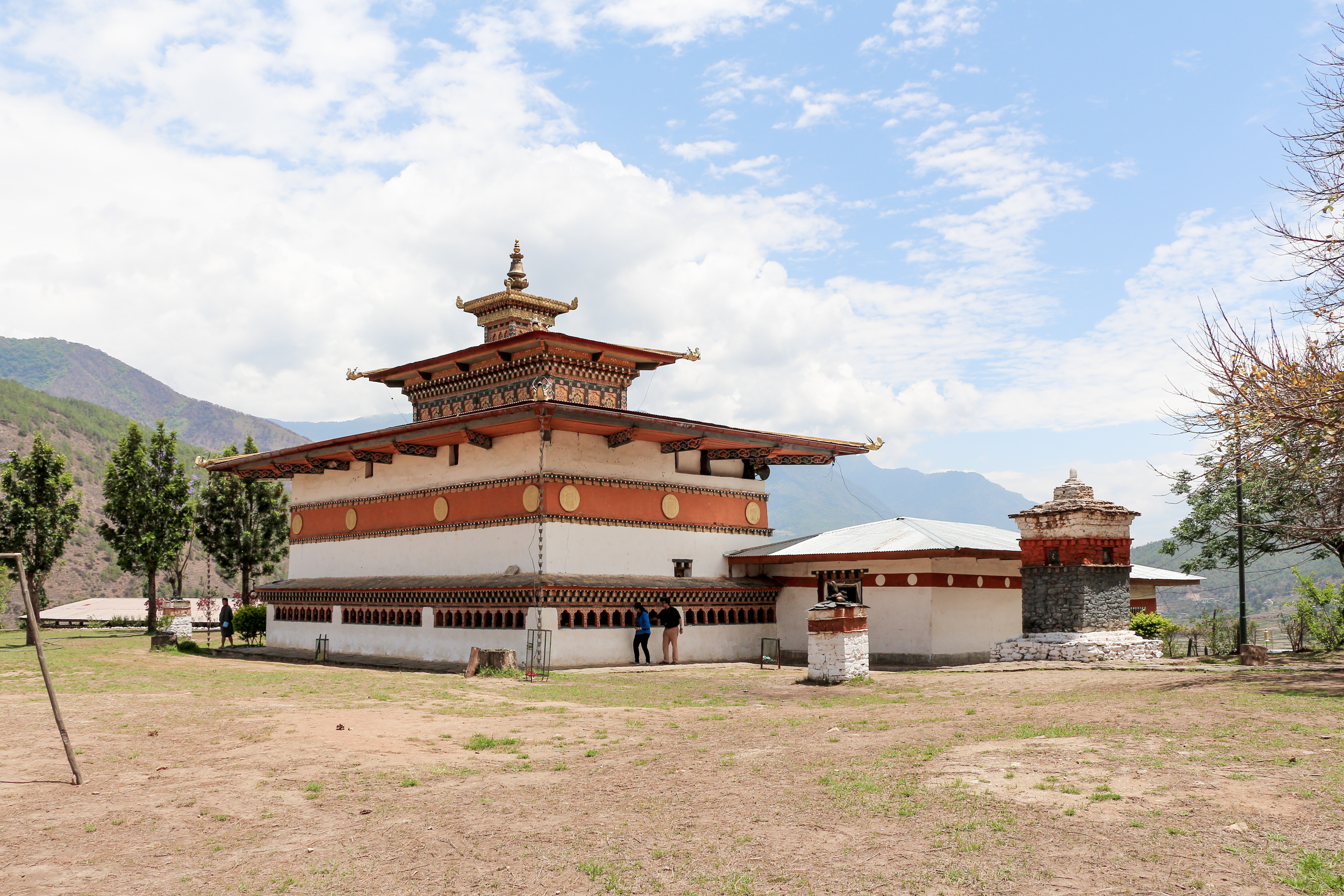
- View of Chimi Monastery and the chorten

- Location within Bhutan

Religion
- Affiliation: Tibetan Buddhism
- Sect: Drukpa Kagyu
- Leadership: Lama Kinga Norbu

Location
- Location: Punakha District
- Country: Bhutan
- Interactive map of Chimi Lhakhang
- Coordinates: 27.5270°N 89.8782°E

Architecture
- Style: Bhutanese
- Founder: Ngawang Chogyal
- Established: 1499; 527 years ago

Chimi Lhakhang (Dzongkha: ཁྱི་མེད་ལྷ་ཁང), also known as Chime Lhakhang or Monastery or temple, is a Buddhist monastery in Punakha District, Bhutan. Located near Lobesa, it stands on a round hillock and was founded and built in 1499 by the Drukpa Kagyu lama Ngawang Chogyal, who was the 14th abbot of Ralung Monastery.

Due to its construction in the location where the demoness who turned into dog was subdued, the temple was named Chimi Lhakhang or Khimey Lhakhang. According to Lam Drukpa Kuenley's biography, the original name of the temple was Khibur/Chibur Lhakhang. Although Khi/Chi is a dog, bur refers to a stack or mound that was created after the tamed dog has been buried.

The site was blessed by Ngawang Chogyal's cousin, Drukpa Kunley (1455–1529), who also built a chorten on the site. In preparing and blessing the site it is said that Lama Kunley subdued a demon of Dochu La with his "magic thunderbolt of wisdom" and trapped it in a rock at the location close to where the chorten now stands. He was known as the "Mad Saint" or “Divine Madman” for his unorthodox ways of teaching Buddhism by singing, humour and outrageous behaviour, which amounted to being bizarre, shocking and with sexual overtones. He is also the saint who advocated the use of phallus symbols as paintings on walls and as flying carved wooden phalluses on house tops at four corners of the eaves. The monastery is the repository of the original wooden symbol of phallus that Kunley brought from Tibet. This wooden phallus is decorated with a silver handle and is used to bless people who visit the monastery on pilgrimage, particularly women seeking blessings to beget children. The tradition at the monastery is to strike pilgrims on the head with a 10-inch (25 cm) wooden phallus (erect penis). Traditionally symbols of an erect penis in Bhutan have been intended to drive away the evil eye and malicious gossip.

== Geography ==
The Lhakhang is located 10 kilometres (6.2 mi) from Punakha near a village called Sopsokha from where a 20 minutes walk along muddy and dusty path through agricultural fields of mustards and rice, leads to a hillock where the monastery and the chorten are situated. Prayer flags are lined all along the road from the tiny village hamlet known as Yowakha, along a drain or stream to the monastery. All houses in the village have paintings of phalluses on their exterior walls. The lama Kunley had called the hillock where the monastery exists as the breast of a woman because of its round shape.

== Structure and traditions ==
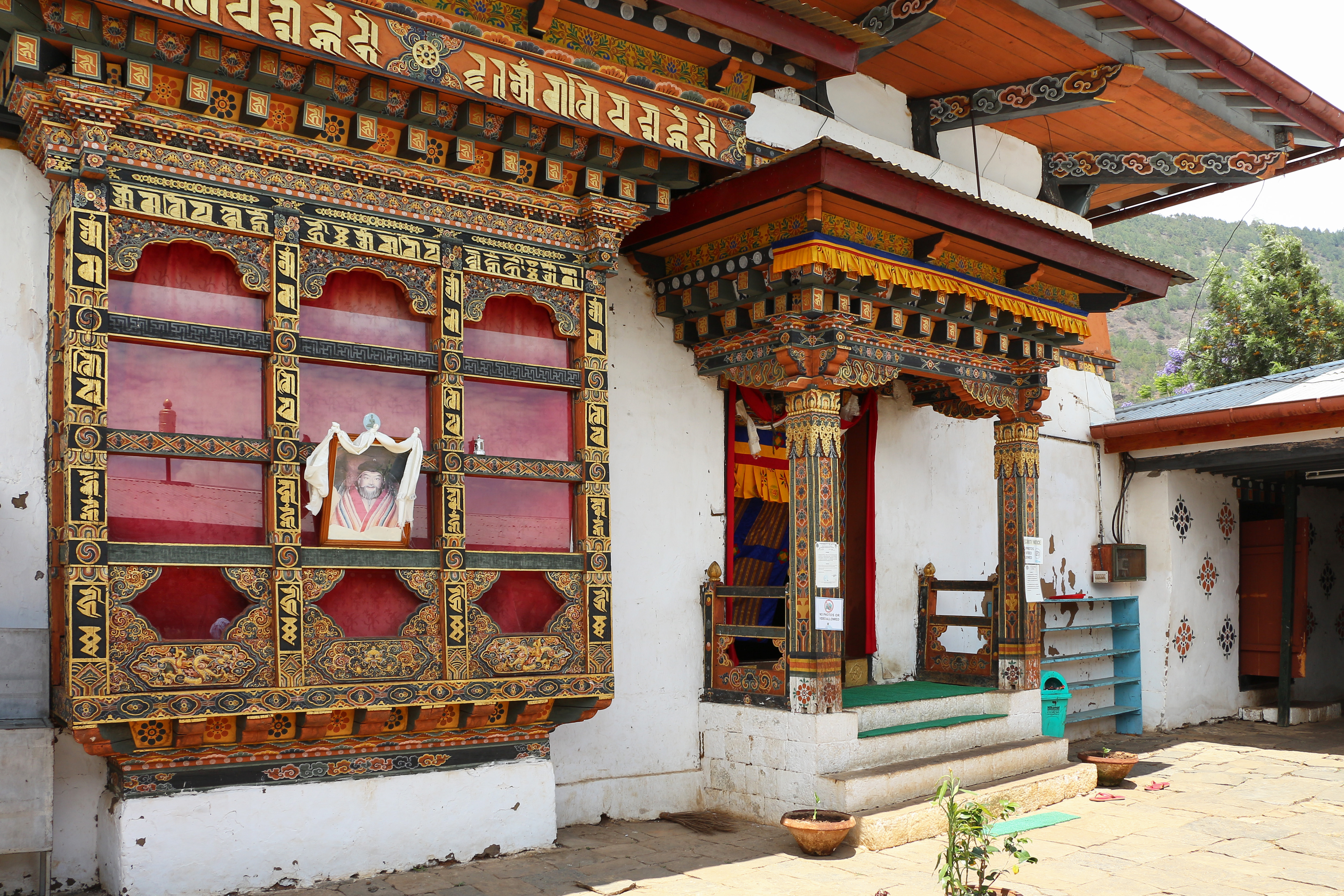
Entrance of the monastery

The Lhakhang is of modest size, square in shape with a golden spire. It is a golden yellow roofed building. It has a row of prayer wheels and its exterior walls are embedded with slates carved with images of saints. Near the entrance to the Lhakhang, there is this small chorten which marks the location where the demoness was subdued by Lama Kunley. The prayer hall inside the monastery has tantric paraphernalia, thangkas, bells, drums, horns, dorjis and a kangd. The statue of Kunley, in a monk's robe, is centrally located at the altar here, in a reclining position with a ceramic statue of his dog Sachi. Images of Zhabdrung, Sakyamuni Buddha and Chenresig are also deified in the monastery. Women who come to the monastery seeking blessings of children get hit on the head by the presiding Lama with a 10 inches (25 cm) ivory, wood and bone phallus. They also make the pilgrimage to get the name of the child to be born. They do this by picking bamboo slips placed in the altar inscribed with names of boys and girls. It is also said that the small chorten at the altar was made by Kunley himself. There are also frescoes painted on the walls of the monastery depicting the Mad saint's colourful life.

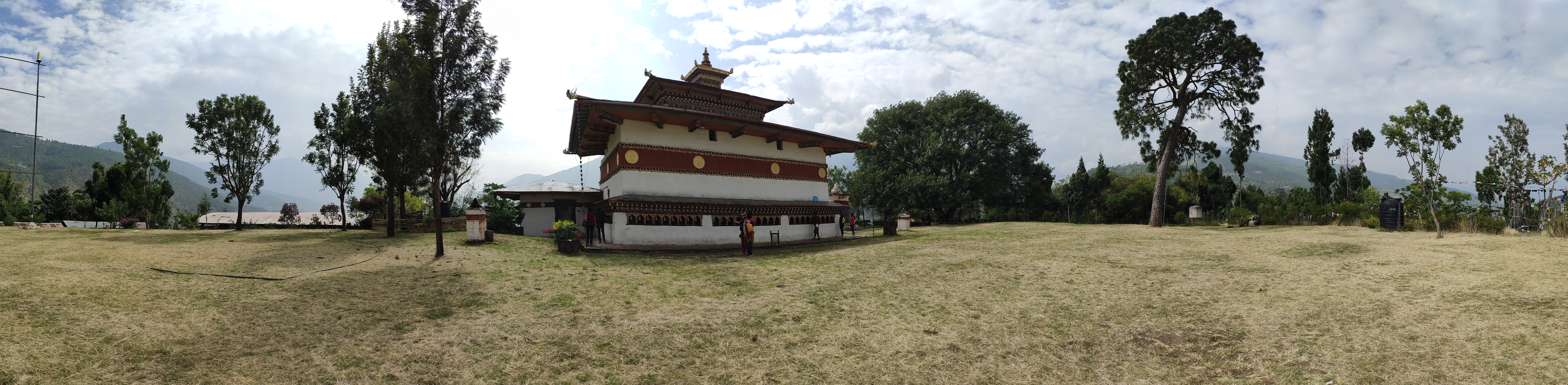
Panoramic view of Chimi Lhakhang

== Legend ==
There are several legends and anecdotes connected with the Lakhang and Drukpa Kunley. According to one legend Kunley, who was also known for his supernatural powers had predicted the death of other lamas, which came true. However, Lama Kunley and his dog Sachi, whose statues are deified in the monastery, attained heaven.

== Notes ==
- Brown, Lindsey; Bradley Mayhew; Stan Armington; Richard Whitecross (2009). Bhutan. Penguin. ISBN 978-1-74059-529-2.
- Pommaret, Francoise (2003). Bhutan: Himalayan Mountains Kingdom (5 ed.). Odyssey Publishing. ISBN 978-9-62217-757-4.
