= The Hundred Thousand Songs of Milarepa =

Collection of songs of realization by the Vajrayana yogi Milarepa

The Hundred Thousand Songs of Milarepa, or the Mila Grubum, is a collection of songs of realization by the Vajrayana yogi Milarepa. For Tibetan Buddhists, it is a source of both instruction and inspiration regarding Mahamudra, especially beloved among the Kagyu school. Its contents include tales of Milarepa defeating and converting demons, his relationships with and teachings to fellow humans, and other miscellaneous stories; most of these tales concern Buddhist beliefs and yogic-mystic experience.

In the 15th century, Tsangnyön Heruka compiled Milarepa's songs and mixed them with stories from Milarepa's life. In 1962, Garma C. Chang's translation of the Mila Grubum was published; over fifty years later, Christopher Stagg's version was published, both based on the 15th century edition by Heruka.

== See also ==
- Mahamudra
- Mahasiddha
