= Ünyön Künga Zangpo =

Yogin of the Kagyu sect of Tibetan Buddhism

Ünyön Künga Zangpo (Tibetan: དབུས་སྨྱོན་ཀུན་དགའ་བཟང་པོ།; Wylie: dbus smyon kun dga' bzang po; 1458-1532) was a famous yogin of the Kagyu sect of Tibetan Buddhism. While Künga Zangpo is a personal name that he received at the time of his monastic ordination, the moniker Ünyön ("ü-nyön"), meaning "Madman from the Ü [region]," was a title he earned through his distinctive tantric asceticism.

The term "the three madmen" (སྨྱོན་པ་གསུམ།; smyon pa gsum) is sometimes used to refer to the Madman of Ü along with his two "madman" contemporaries: the Madman of Tsang, and Drukpa Kunley, "the Madman of the Drukpa [Kagyu].".
