= Tsangnyön Heruka =

Tibetan Buddhist master and author

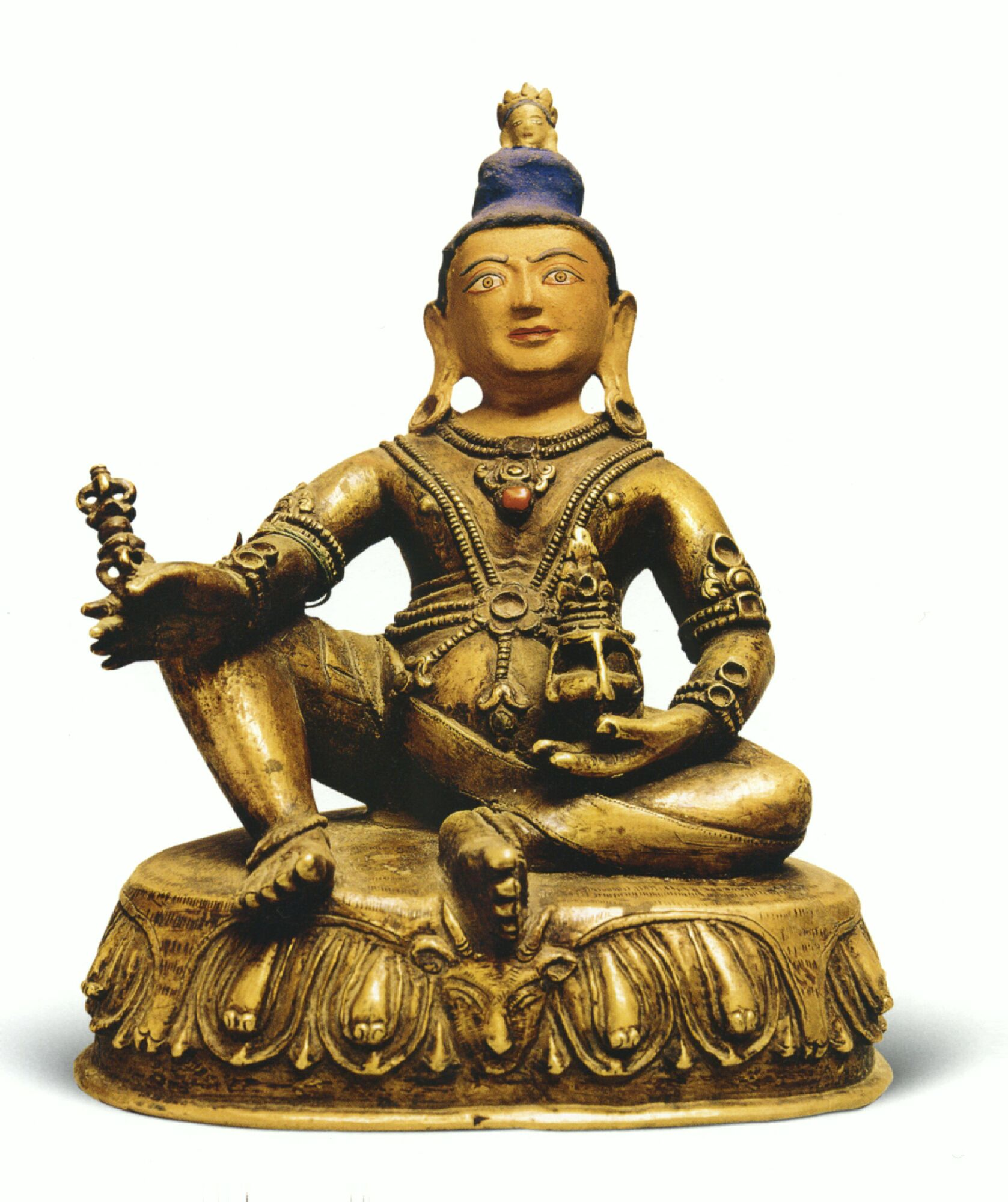
Tsangnyon Heruka Kagyu Lama

Tsangnyön Heruka (Tibetan: གཙང་སྨྱོན་ཧེ་རུ་ཀ་, Wylie: gtsang smyon He ru ka "The Madman Heruka from Tsang", 1452-1507), was an author and a master of the Kagyu school of Tibetan Buddhism. Born in Tsang, he is best known as a biographer and compiler of the Life of Milarepa and The Hundred Thousand Songs of Milarepa, both classics of Tibetan literature.

== Life ==
Tsangnyön Heruka was a nyönpa (Wylie: smyon pa) or "religious madman", whose eccentric ways of life were considered signs of spiritual realization. He was ordained as a śrāmaṇera, but at the age of 21 renounced his vows and trained under various tantric yogis from different schools. His first teacher was Shara Rabjampa Sanggye Sengge (1427–1470) who conveyed to him the "Aural Transmissions" (snyan brgyud) of the Kagyu tradition. Tsangnyön spent years in solitary retreat on Tsari in southern Tibet, which is the major sacred mountain retreat for the Kagyu school. He also studied the tantras in Pelkhor Chode Monastery in Gyantse for three years.

After Heruka left the monastery, he became a wandering yogi for the rest of his life, never staying in one place permanently. He was known to keep his hair long, carry a khaṭvāṅga and drink from a kapāla. When local villagers saw his body covered in human ashes and blood with his hair adorned by human fingers and toes, they gave him the name "Nyönpa" (madman). He later used the name Trantung Gyelpo (Wylie: khrag 'thung rgyal po) "King of the Blood-drinkers"—"blood drinker" being the Tibetan name for the deity Heruka. These eccentric ways were influenced by an Indian sect of yogis called Kāpālikas or "skull-bearers", who practiced austerities, as well as dressing in loincloths and human ashes and carrying symbols of the dākiṇis such as bone ornaments and skulls.

Many monks questioned his behavior and way of dress, but Tsangnyön was known to strongly defend his unconventional practice through rigorous argument and accurate quotations from scriptures. He became a famous teacher and gathered numerous followers; he was also a composer of religious songs. Tsangnyön was very influential with various Tibetan political leaders and he used his influence to mediate between warring factions.

In 1488 while staying at the pilgrimage site Lapchi Snow Mountain, Tsangnyön completed the Life of Milarepa, a biography of the Tibetan poet. It was one of the first texts that was produced through woodblock printing in Tibet and it quickly became a widely circulated text. Tsangnyön's main goal seems to have been the promotion of the teachings of the early Kagyu masters.

In 1504, Ratna Malla, the king of Kantipur, invited Tsangnyön Heruka to Nepal to restore the famous stupa known as Swayambhunath. Tsangnyön traveled to Nepal and completed the renovation within three months. In 1505, he compiled a biography and a song collection of Marpa Lotsawa. He also completed his major life work, which was the collection of the aural transmissions of the Kagyu tradition. He died at the age of fifty-five in 1507 at Rechung-Puk north of the Yarlung Valley.

== Legacy ==
After his death three of his disciples wrote biographies of him: Gotsangrepa, Lhatsun Rinchen Namgyel and Ngodrub Pembar. Kuntu Zangmo, Tsangnyön’s female companion, oversaw the printing of his songs, writings and a biography of him.
