= Drukpa Kunley =

Buddhist master (1455–1529)

- འབྲུག་པ་ཀུན་ལེགས་
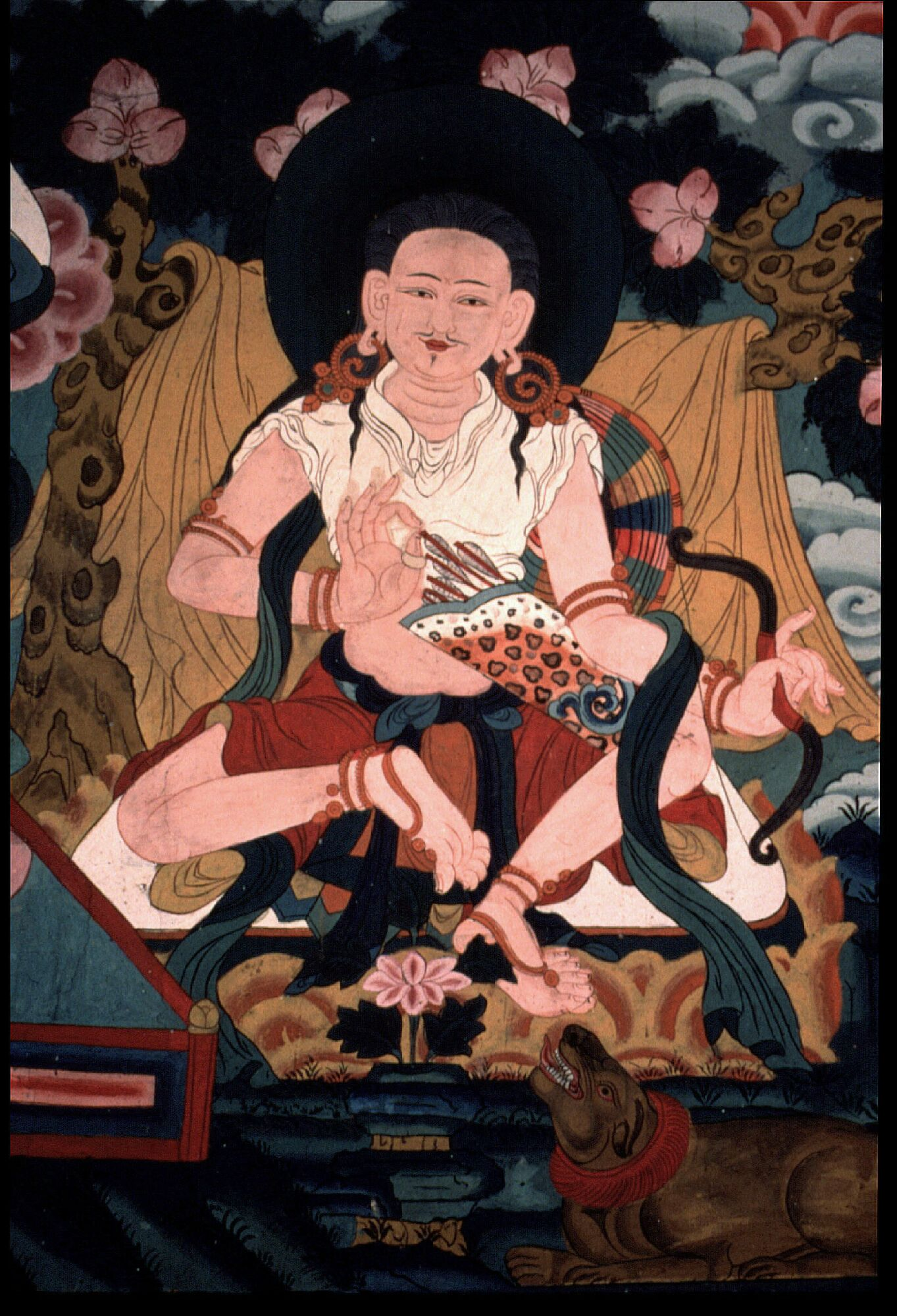

Personal life
- Born: 1455
- Died: 1529 (aged 73–74)
- Parents: Rinchen Zangpo (father); Gomokee (mother)

Religious life
- Religion: Tibetan Buddhism

Drukpa Kunley (1455–1529), also known as Kunga Legpai Zangpo, Drukpa Kunleg (Tibetan: འབྲུག་པ་ཀུན་ལེགས་, Wylie: brug pa kun legs), and Kunga Legpa, the Madman of the Dragon Lineage (Tibetan: འབྲུག་སྨྱོན་ཀུན་དགའ་ལེགས་པ་, Wylie: 'brug smyon kun dga' legs pa), was a Tibetan Buddhist monk, missionary, and poet in the Drukpa Kagyu lineage of the Mahamudra tradition. He was trained at Ralung Monastery under siddha Pema Lingpa. However, by the age of 25, he had returned his monastic vows to take a wife, whose name was Tsewang Dzom (tshe dbang 'dzom). He is often counted among the Nyönpa ("mad ones"). He is considered to have been a reincarnation of Saraha.

== Biography ==
Drukpa Kunley was born into the branch of the noble Gya (Tibetan: རྒྱ, Wylie: rgya) clan of Ralung Monastery in the Tsang region of western Tibet, which was descended from Lhabum (lha 'bum), the second eldest brother of Tsangpa Gyare. His father was Rinchen Zangpo and mother was Gomokee. He was nephew to the 2nd Gyalwang Drukpa and father of Ngawang Tenzin and Zhingkyong Drukdra.

He was known for his crazy methods of enlightening other beings, mostly women, which earned him the title "The Saint of 5,000 Women". Among other things, women would seek his blessing in the form of sexual intercourse. His intention was to show that it is possible to be enlightened, impart enlightenment, and still lead a very healthy sex life, and to demonstrate that celibacy was not necessary for being enlightened. In addition, he wanted to expand the range of means by which enlightenment could be imparted, while adding new evolutionary prospects to the overarching tradition. He is credited with introducing the practice of phallus paintings in Bhutan and placing statues of them on rooftops to drive away evil spirits. He is also known for Chimi Lhakhang, the temple of fertility.

Because of this power to awaken unenlightened beings, Kunley's penis is referred to as the "Thunderbolt of Flaming Wisdom" and he himself is known as the "fertility saint". For this reason, women from all around the world visited his monastery to seek his blessing.

== Main teachers ==
- Gyalwang Drukpa II, Gyalwang Kunga Paljor ('brug chen kun dga' dpal 'byor) 1428-1476
- Lhatsun Kunga Chökyi Gyatso (lha btsun kun dga' chos kyi rgya mtsho) 1432-1505
- Pema Lingpa (padma gling pa) 1450-1521
