= Milarepa =

Tibetan yogi

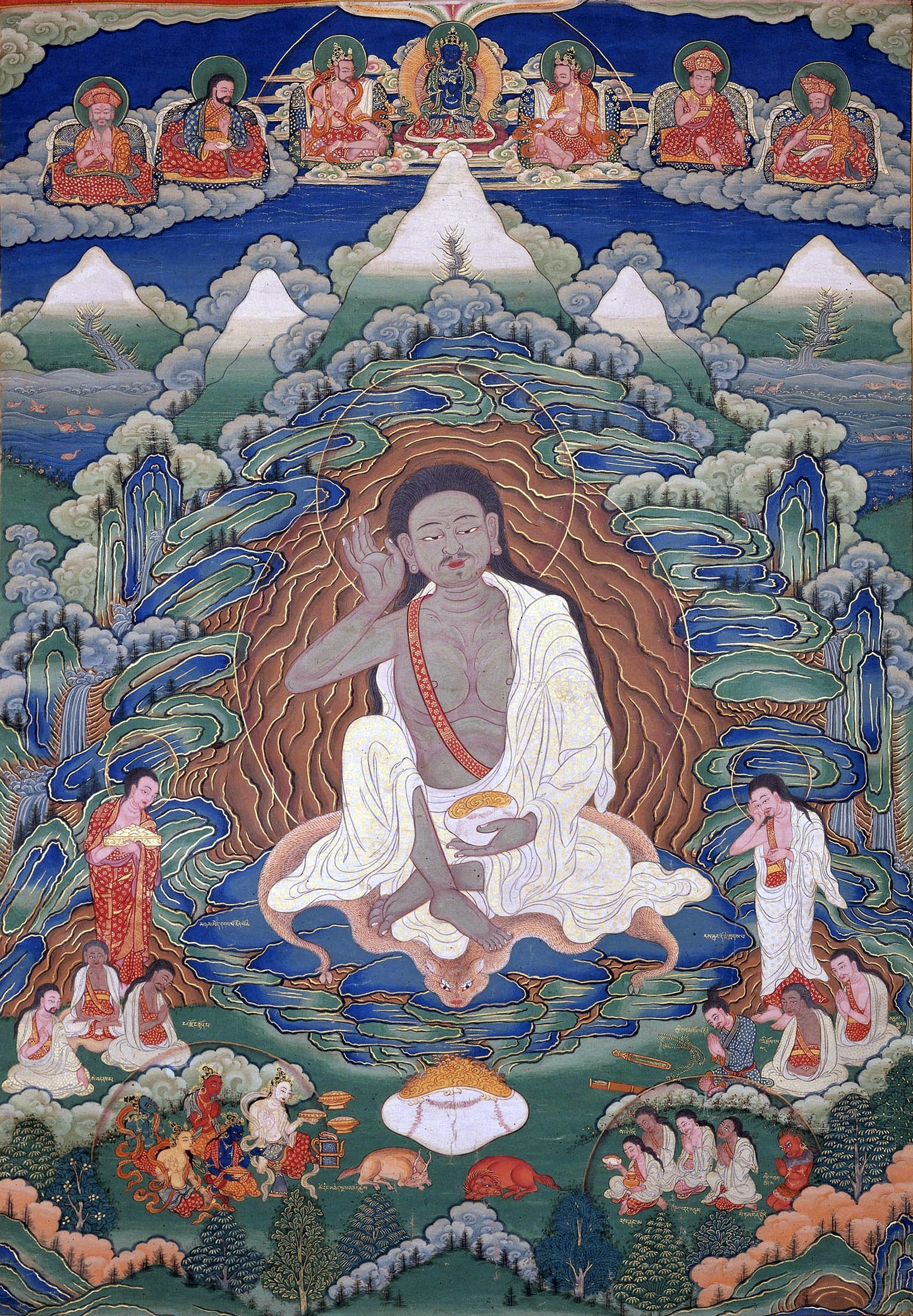
- Bhutanese thangka of Milarepa from Thimphu, Bhutan, c. late 19th-early 20th century
- Title: Mahasiddha

Personal life
- Born: 1050s Western Tibet
- Died: 1130s

Religious life
- Religion: Tibetan Buddhism
- School: Kagyu

Senior posting
- Teacher: Marpa Lotsawa
- Students: Gampopa

Jetsun Milarepa (Tibetan: རྗེ་བཙུན་མི་ལ་རས་པ་, Wylie: rje btsun mi la ras pa; 1052-1135), originally named Topaga, was a Tibetan siddha, who was famously known as a killer when he was a young man, before turning to Buddhism and becoming a highly accomplished Buddhist disciple. He is generally considered one of Tibet's most famous yogis and spiritual poets, whose teachings are known among several schools of Tibetan Buddhism, particularly the Kagyu. He was a student of Marpa Lotsawa, and a major figure in the history of the Kagyu school of Tibetan Buddhism. He is also famous for his songs of realization (compiled as the The Hundred Thousand Songs of Milarepa by Tsangnyön Heruka), and the feat of climbing Mount Kailash.

== Historicity ==
Milarepa's life-story is famous in Tibetan culture, and retold many times. The best-known biography, The Life of Milarepa, written by Tsangnyön Heruka (1452–1507) in the fifteenth century and drawing on older biographies, is still very popular. Most of the present-day stories on Milarepa come from this single source, with oral lineage predominating as well as relics including his bearskin coat. While "very little [is known] about him as a historical person at all," Milarepa is venerated by all Tibetan schools "as an exemplar of religious dedication and mastery." His life story established the lineage of the Kagyu sect and its key figures.

=== Historical context ===
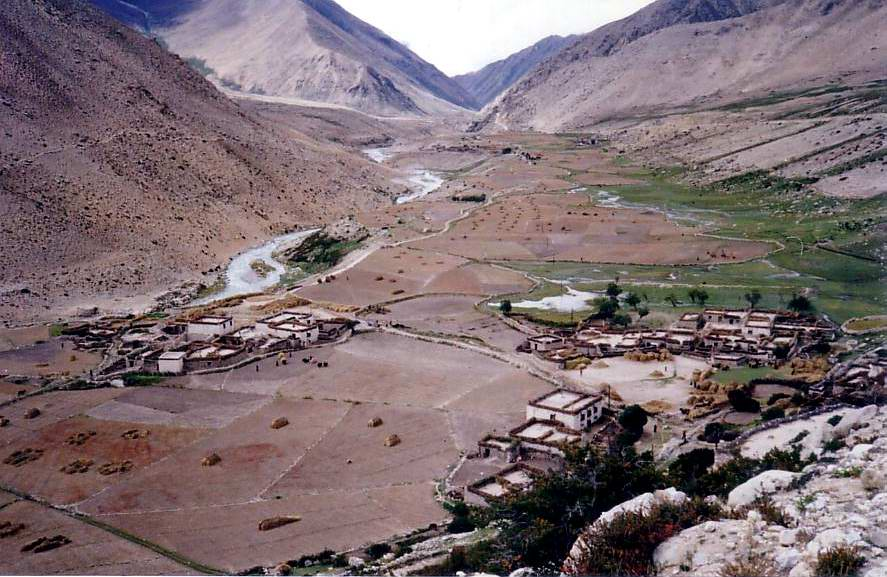
Overlooking Pelgyeling Gompa at Milarepa's Cave, Tibet.

Milarepa lived during the so-called second dissemination of Buddhism in Tibet (10th–12th century), when Buddhism was re-introduced. Three pivotal figures in this Tibetan Renaissance were Rinchen Zangpo (958–1055), who translated sutras, tantras and commentaries; Atiśa (982–1054), whose student Dromtön founded the Kadam school of Tibetan Buddhism; and Marpa the Translator, the teacher of Milarepa, and himself regarded as student of Naropa. Marpa introduced tantric texts and oral instructions from the siddha tradition into Tibet, and Marpa's purported connection with Naropa established the lineage of the Kagyu school, thereby reaching back to the Buddha himself.

According to Donald S. Lopez Jr., The Life of Milarepa represents "Buddhism as it was understood and practiced in Tibet in the fifteenth century, projected back in time." It contains "many of the key terms and doctrines of Buddhism." Tsangnyön Heruka did his best to establish a lineage of teachers that connects the Kagyu tradition with the Indian siddha tradition, portraying Marpa as a student of Naropa, though Naropa had already died when Marpa went to India.

== Biography ==
=== Early life ===
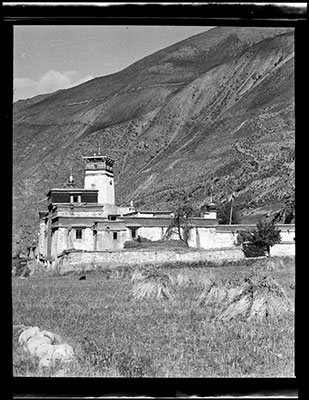
The nine story tower that Milarepa single-handedly built, Sekar Gutok Monastery, Lhodrag, Tibet.

According to The Life of Milarepa, Milarepa was born in western Tibet to a prosperous family. When his father died, his family was deprived of their wealth by his aunt and uncle. At his mother's request, Milarepa left home and studied sorcery to take revenge, killing many people by collapsing buildings and causing hailstorms that ruined crops.

=== Training and realization ===
Later he felt sorrow about his deeds, and became a student of Marpa the Translator. Before Marpa would teach Milarepa, he had him undergo abuse and trials, such as letting him build and then demolish three towers in turn. Milarepa was asked to build one final multi-story tower by Marpa at Lhodrag, which still stands. Eventually, Marpa accepted him, explaining that the trials were a means to purify Milarepa's negative karma. Marpa transmitted Tantric initiations and instructions to Milarepa, including tummo ("yogic heat"), the "aural transmissions" (Wylie: snyan rgyud), and mahamudra. Marpa told Milarepa to practice solitary meditation in caves and mountain retreats.

According to the biography, after many years of practice, Milarepa came to "a deep experiential realization about the true nature of reality." In some other sources, it is said that Milarepa and Marpa both came to India to seek one most important thing for ultimate realization from Marpa's guru, but even he didn't know about it. Later on he tried for many years and finally attained enlightenment. Thereafter he lived as a fully realized yogi, and eventually forgave his aunt, who caused his family's misfortune.

== Tibetan Buddha ==
Lopez notes that Tsangnyön Heruka used stylistic elements from the biography of Shakyamuni Buddha to portray Milarepa effectively as a Tibetan Buddha, "born and enlightened in Tibet" The life story of Milarepa portrays "the rapid method of the Tantric path," in which liberation is gained in one lifetime. It describes how Milarepa practiced the generation stage and completion stage, to achieve mahamudra, "spontaneous realization of the most profound nature of mind." Yet, in his instructions to his Tibetan audiences, Milarepa refers to the basic Buddhist teachings of "impermanence, the sufferings of saṃsāra, the certainty of death and the uncertainty of its arrival, the frightful rebirth that is the direct result of our benighted deeds." But, his own life also is an example that even a killer can transform into a Buddha. Lopez further notes that The Life of Milarepa portrays two parallel worlds, a profane world and a sacred world, which are ultimately one, showing that the world itself is sacred.

== Students ==
Gampopa was Milarepa's most renowned student. Four of Gampopa's students founded the four major branches of the Kagyu lineage: Barom Kagyu, Karma Kagyu, Phagdru Kagyu, and Tshalpa Kagyu. Another of Milarepa's students, the yogi Rechungpa, brought several important transmissions into the Karma Kagyu lineage. Along with Gampopa, Rechungpa was a teacher of the 1st Karmapa Dusum Khyenpa (1110–1193). Upon meeting Dusum Khyenpa, Gampopa told his students, "He is pretending to be a disciple of mine in order to hold my lineage for future sentient beings, but in actuality, he has already accomplished the goal of the path."

== The Hundred Thousand Songs of Milarepa ==
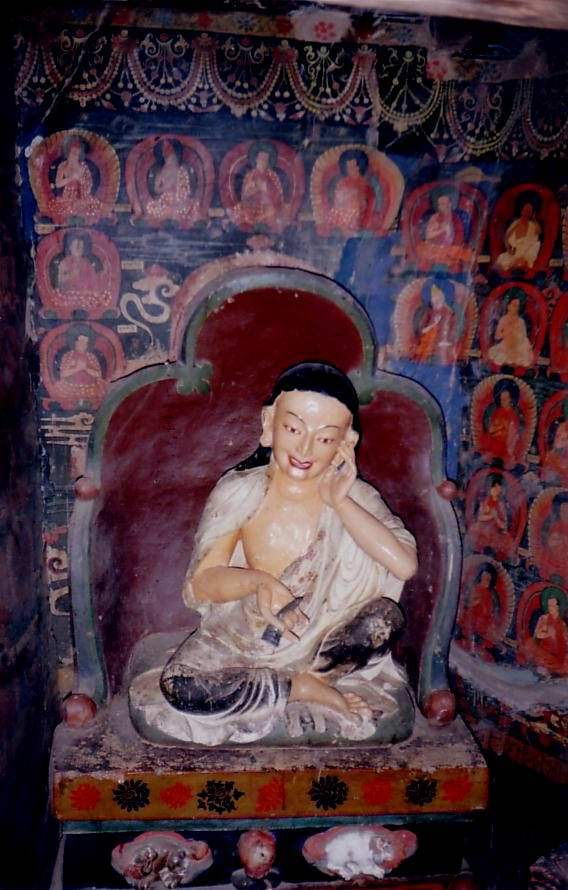
Milarepa statue, Pango Chorten, Gyantse, Tibet.

The acclaimed spiritual poetry (known as doha; spontaneous songs of awakening) of Milarepa is known of as The Hundred Thousand Songs of Milarepa. Previous biographies of Milarepa were enlarged with religious poetry and song cycles, which doubled the volume of biographical information. Collected for publication in English translation by the Oriental Studies Foundation in 1962, in 1999 these songs were re-published in a separate volume entitled The Hundred Thousand Songs of Milarepa translated and annotated by Garma C.C. Chang, then in 2017 a new translation by Christopher Stagg of the Nitartha Translation Network, both published by Shambhala. These summarize the various song cycles in chapter eleven of The Life of Milarepa.

== In media ==
Literature

- Éric-Emmanuel Schmitt. Milarepa ("Milarepa", 1997).

Film

- Milarepa (1973), dir. Liliana Cavani
- Milarepa (2006), dir. Neten Chokling

== Gallery ==
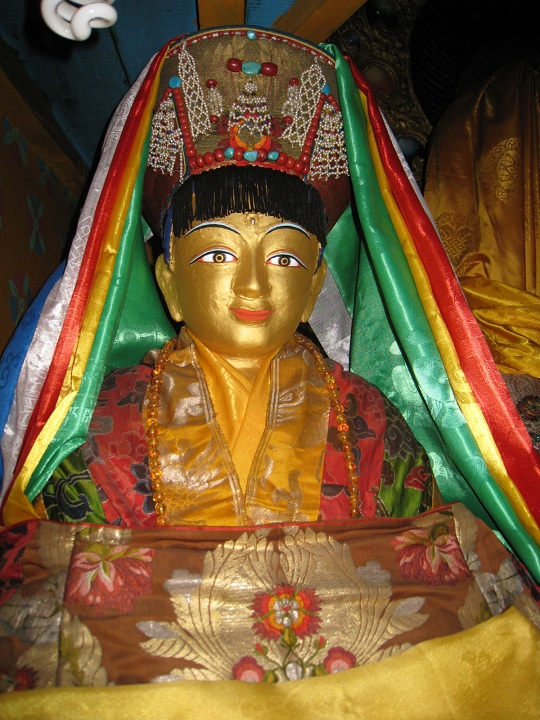
A famous statue of Milarepa self made by Milerapa's root student Bhu Rechungpa which later belonged to Nyanang Phelgyeling Monastery, Tibet and now is in Phelgyeling Monastery, Nepal

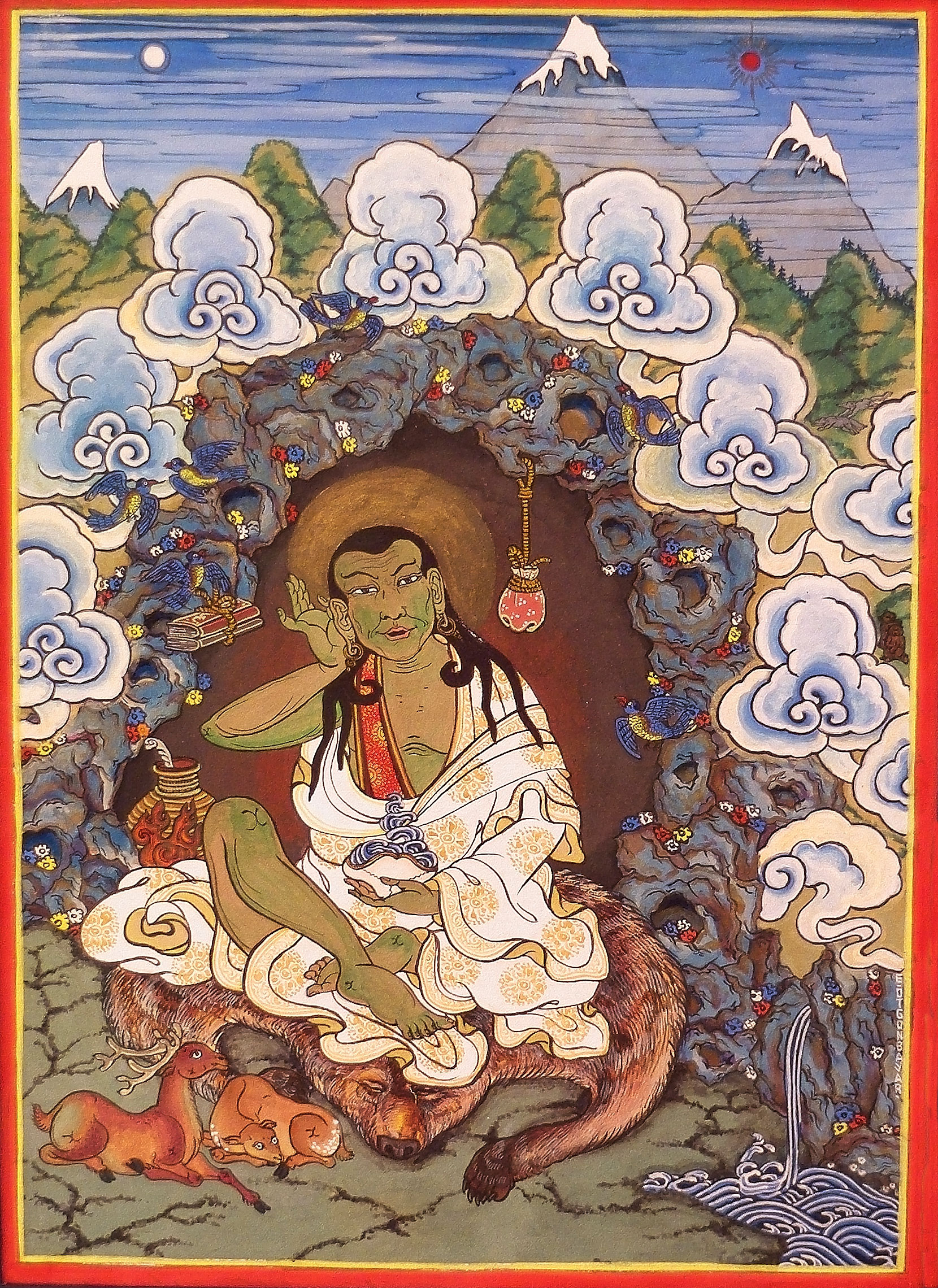
Milarepa, Tempera on cotton, 21 cm × 30 cm (8 in × 12 in), 2008 Otgonbayar Ershuu

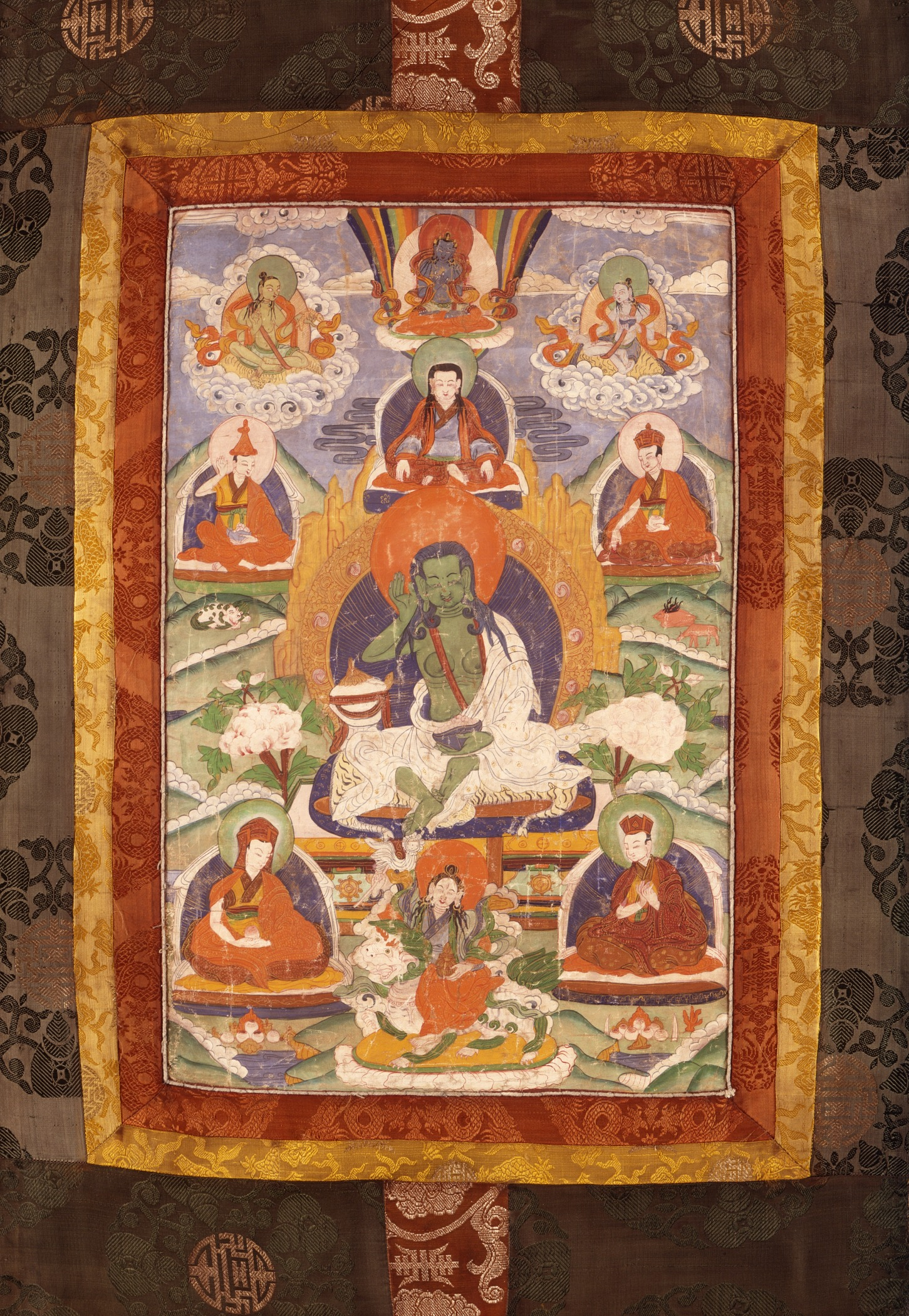
Tibetan or Nepalese painted thangka of Milarepa, 19th century, mineral pigments and gold on cotton clothes of Nepal.

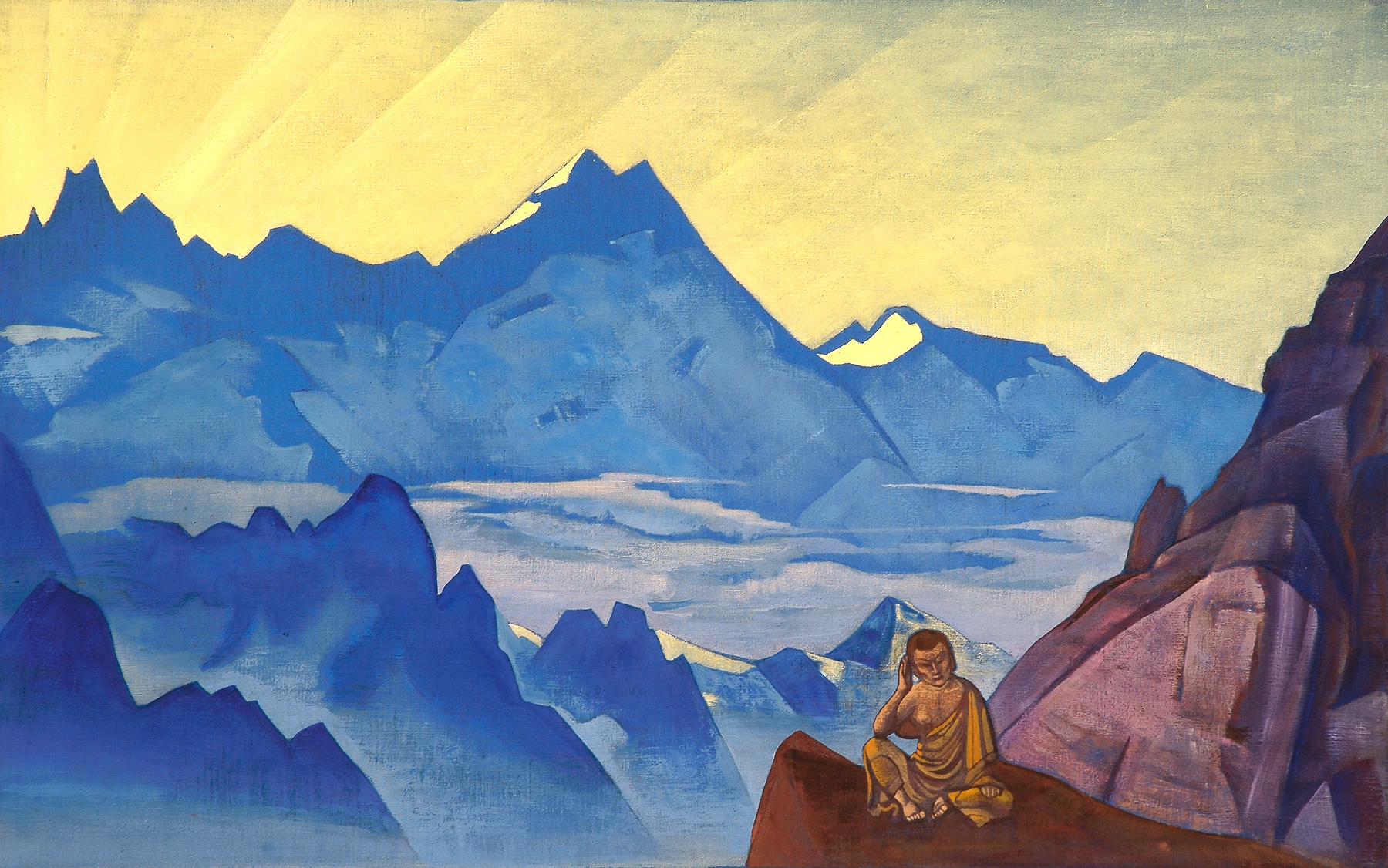
Milarepa, the One Who Harkened painting by Nicholas Roerich, c. 1925

== See also ==
- Detachment (philosophy)
- Éliane Radigue
- Kaihōgyō
- Machig Labdrön
- Milarepa's Cave
- Shugendō

== Sources ==
- Lopez, Donald S. Jr (2010), "Introduction", Tsangnyön Heruka. The Life of Milarepa, Penguin Books, ISBN 978-1-101-45873-0
- Quintman, Andrew (2004), "MI LA RAS PA (MILAREPA)", in Buswell, Robert E. (ed.), Encyclopedia of Buddhism, MacMillan, ISBN 0-02-865720-9
- Quintman, Andrew (2010), "Translator's Introduction", Tsangnyön Heruka. The Life of Milarepa, Penguin Books

Preceded by Marpa Lotsawa	Kagyu school	Succeeded by Gampopa
