= Khumjungar Himal =

Mountain in Nepal

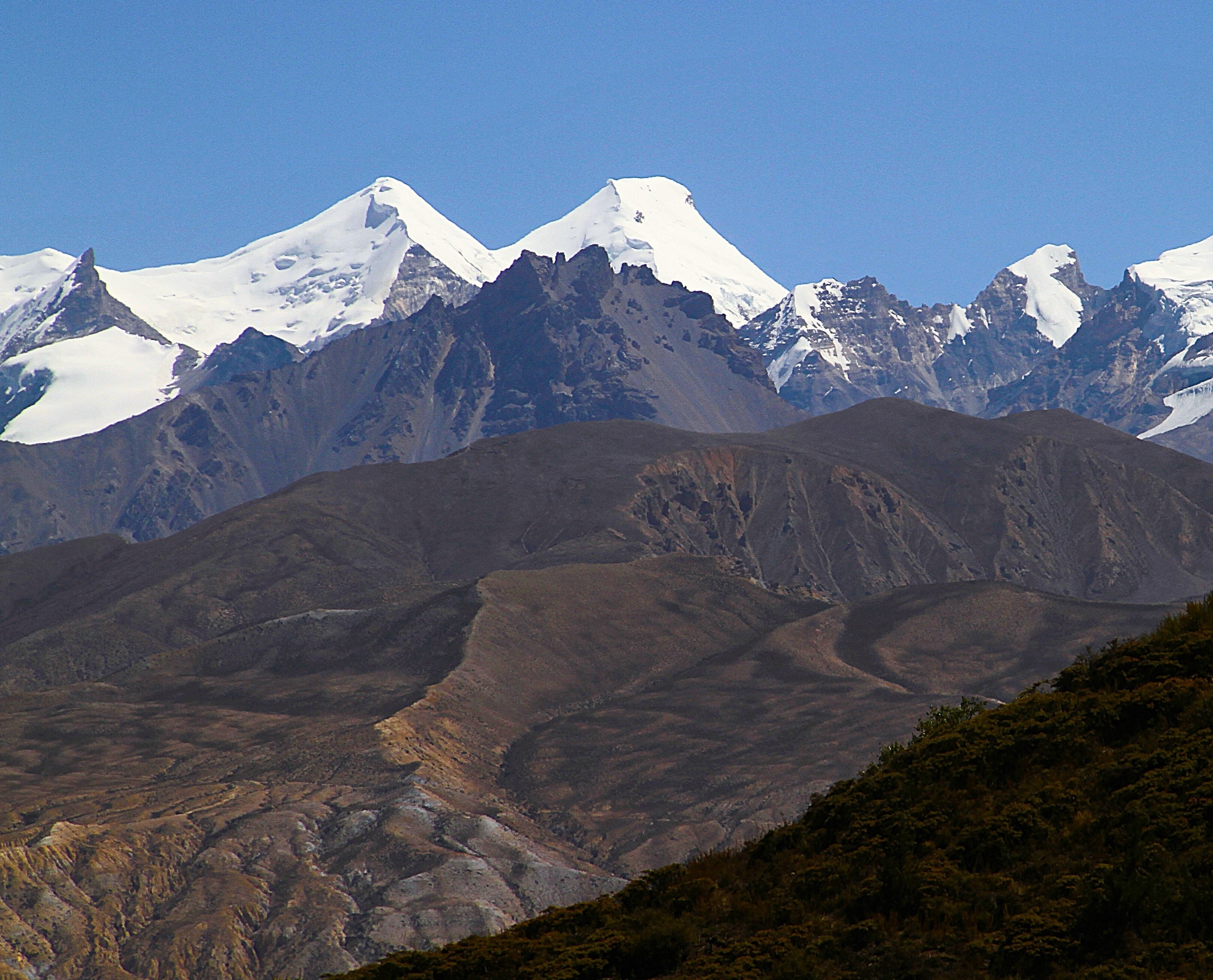
- West aspect, centered on skyline

Highest point
- Elevation: 6,759 m (22,175 ft)
- Prominence: 920 m (3,020 ft)
- Parent peak: Nemjung
- Isolation: 12.93 km (8.03 mi)
- Listing: Mountains of Nepal
- Coordinates: 28°53′20″N 84°07′38″E

Geography
- Location within Nepal
- Interactive map of Khumjungar Himal
- Country: Nepal
- Province: Gandaki
- District: Manang / Mustang
- Protected area: Annapurna Conservation Area
- Parent range: Himalayas; Damodar Himalaya

Climbing
- First ascent: 2023

Khumjungar Himal, also known as Khumjung Himal, is a mountain in Nepal.

== Description ==
Khumjungar Himal is a 6,759-metre (22,175-foot) glaciated summit in the Nepalese Himalayas. It is the highest summit in the Damodar Himalaya subrange. The remote peak is situated 27 kilometres (17 mi) north-northeast of Manang in the Annapurna Conservation Area of Gandaki Province. Precipitation runoff from the mountain's slopes drains into tributaries of the Kali Gandaki and Marshyangdi Rivers. Topographic relief is significant as the south face rises 1,000 metres (3,281 ft) in one kilometre (0.62 mi). The first ascent of the summit may have been made in 1983 by a Japanese expedition, however the first documented ascent was made in 2023 by Prakash Gurung and Yukta G.

== Climate ==
Based on the Köppen climate classification, Khumjungar Himal is located in a tundra climate zone with cold, snowy winters, and cool summers. Weather systems are forced upwards by the Himalaya mountains (orographic lift), causing heavy precipitation in the form of rainfall and snowfall. Mid-June through early-August is the monsoon season. The months of April, May, September, and October offer the most favorable weather for viewing or climbing this peak.

== See also ==
- Geology of the Himalayas
