= Milarepa's Cave =

Milarepa's Cave may refer to any of the numerous caves in the Himalayas used by Tibetan siddha Milarepa as hermitage.

- Milarepa's Cave, Nyalam, Tibet, China
- Milarepa Cave, Gandaki, Nepal

== See also ==
- Milarepa (disambiguation)
