= Namun la Pass =

Pass in the Himalaya of Nepal

Namun La Pass
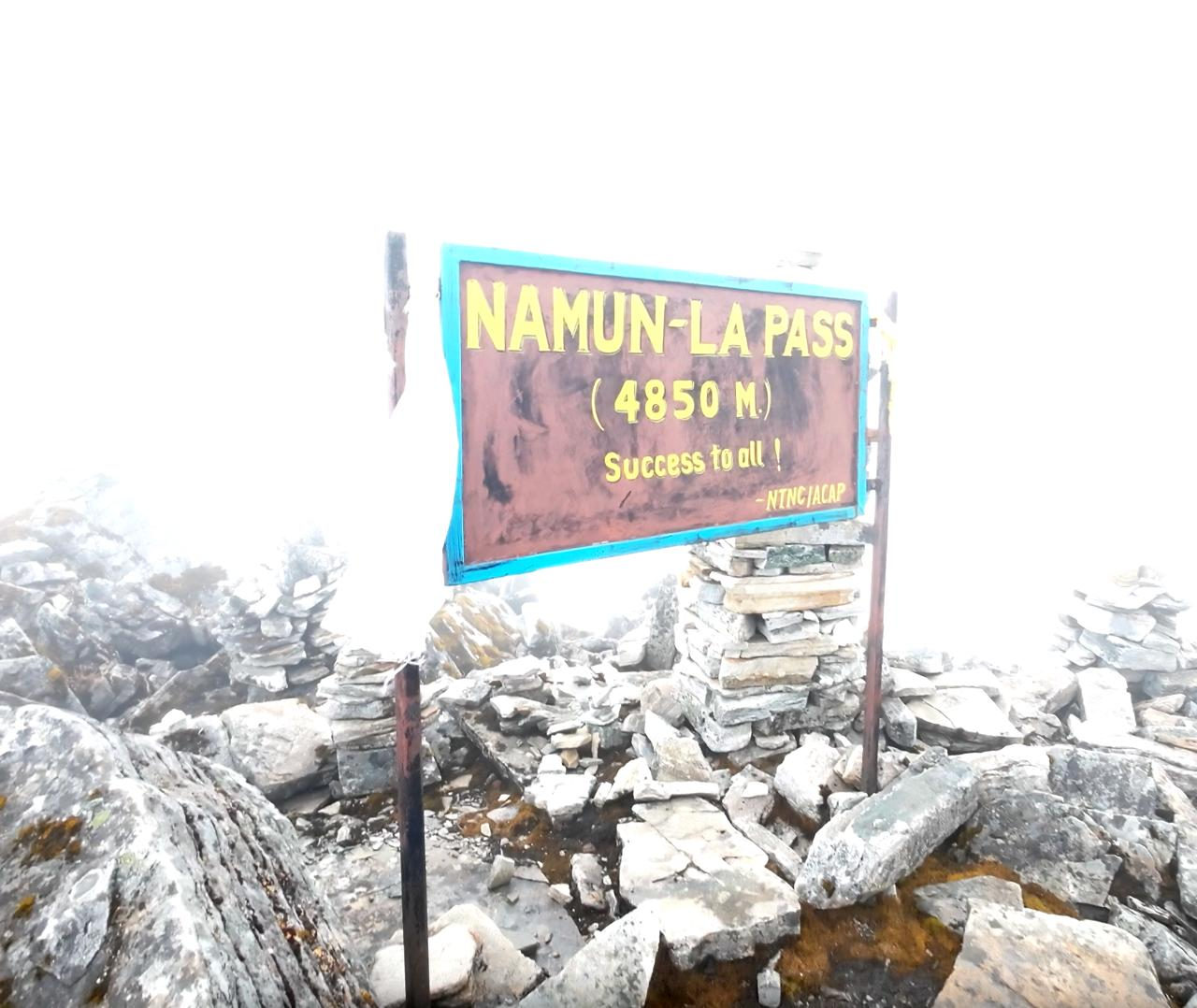
- Namun La Pass

- Location within Nepal
- Elevation: 4,850 metres (15,910 ft)

Third Approach
- Location: Manang, Gandaki Province, Nepal
- Range: Himalayas
- Coordinates: 28°16′31″N 84°10′27″E

Namun la Pass is a mountain pass in Nepal, with an elevation of 4,850 meters (15,910 ft) above sea level in the Annapurna Himalayan range. The pass is located in Manang District, Nashong VDC - 5, through the trail that connects Sikles village to Timang village.

The pass was opened to trekkers in 2008. It was a key route for the Gurung community, historically known as the Tamu, who migrated from Tibet.

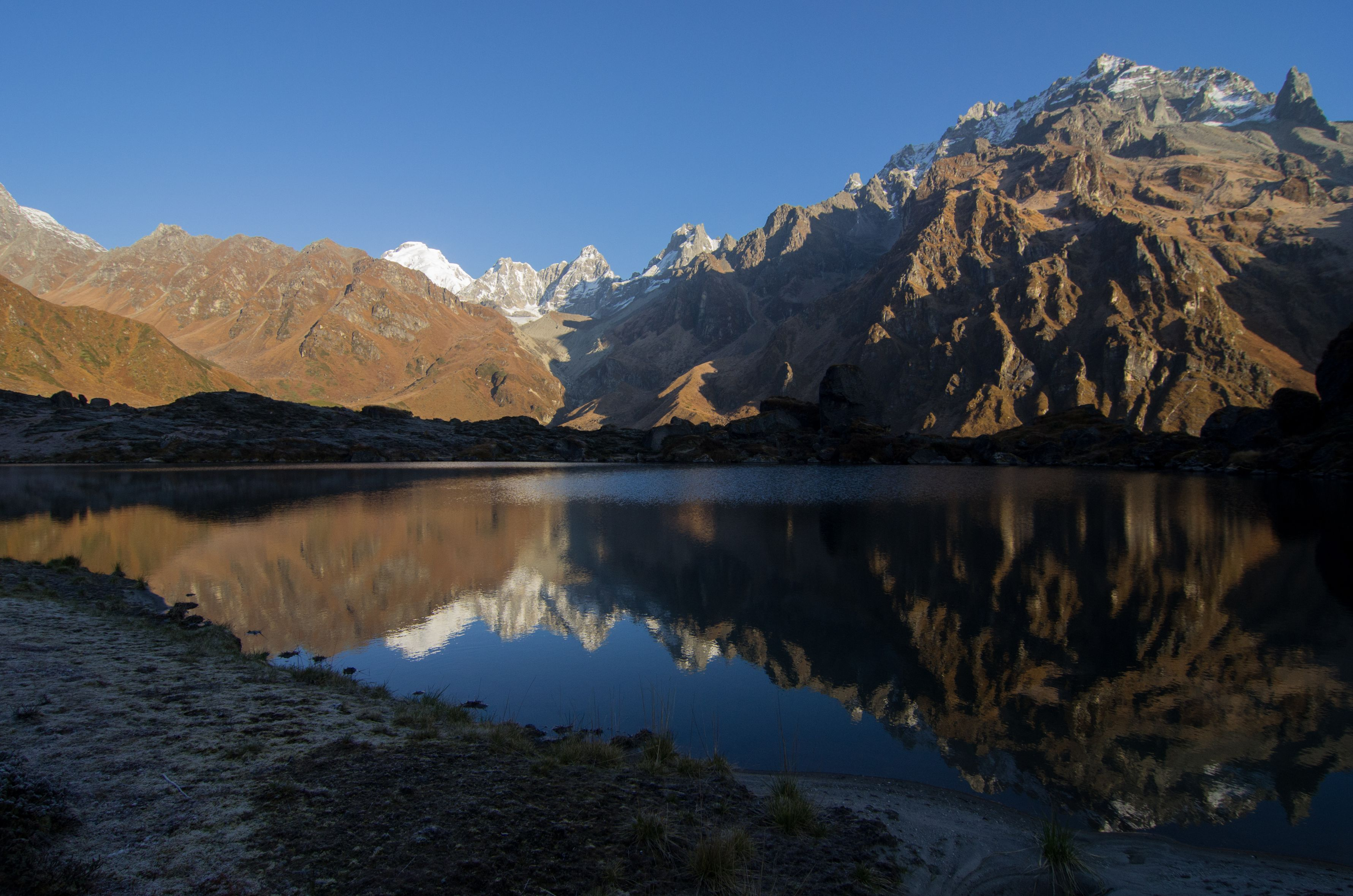
Nameless lake to the east from Namun pass
