= Kobusch =

Kobusch is a German surname. Notable people with the surname include:

- Jost Kobusch (born 1992), German mountaineer and author
- Klaus Kobusch (1941–2025), German track cyclist

== See also ==
- Distorted Reality, a synthpop band with Christian Kobusch
- Christian Kubusch (born 1988), a German freestyle swimmer
