= Purbung =

Mountain in Nepal

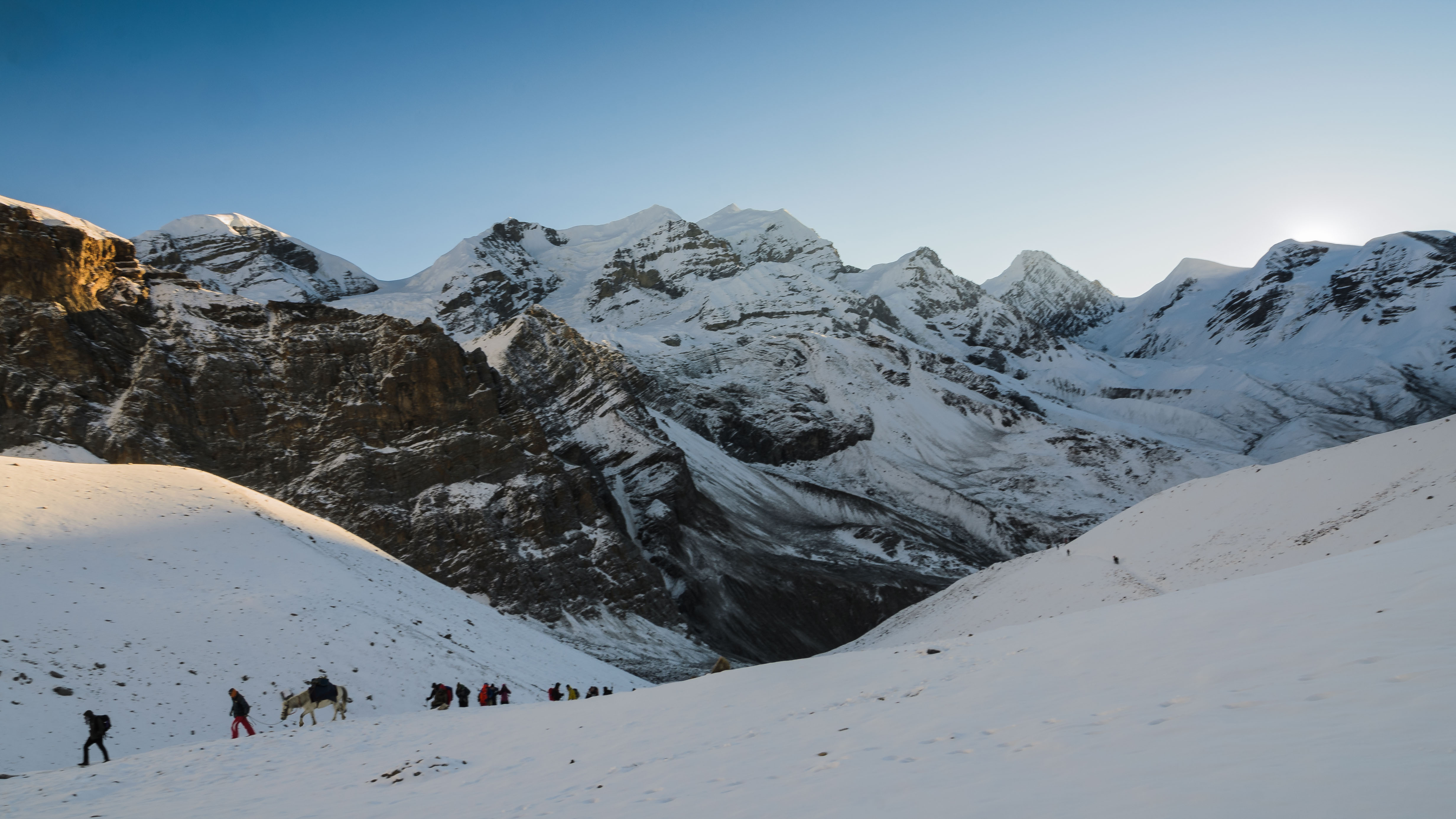
- Purbung centered on skyline

Highest point
- Elevation: 6,465 m (21,211 ft)
- Prominence: 810 m (2,657 ft)
- Parent peak: Chulu East
- Isolation: 7.24 km (4.50 mi)
- Coordinates: 28°48′05″N 84°01′14″E

Geography
- Location within Nepal
- Interactive map of Purbung
- Country: Nepal
- Province: Gandaki
- District: Manang / Mustang
- Protected area: Annapurna Conservation Area
- Parent range: Himalayas; Damodar Himalaya

Climbing
- First ascent: 2021 by Jost Kobusch and Nicolas Scheidtweiler

Purbung (also Putrung) is a mountain in the Himalayas of Nepal in the province of Gandaki Pradesh. Located in the Damodar range it has a height of 6,465 m. Jost Kobusch and Nicolas Scheidtweiler made the first successful ascent on November 30, 2021.

== See also ==
- Geology of the Himalayas
