= Jost Kobusch =

German mountaineer (born 1992)

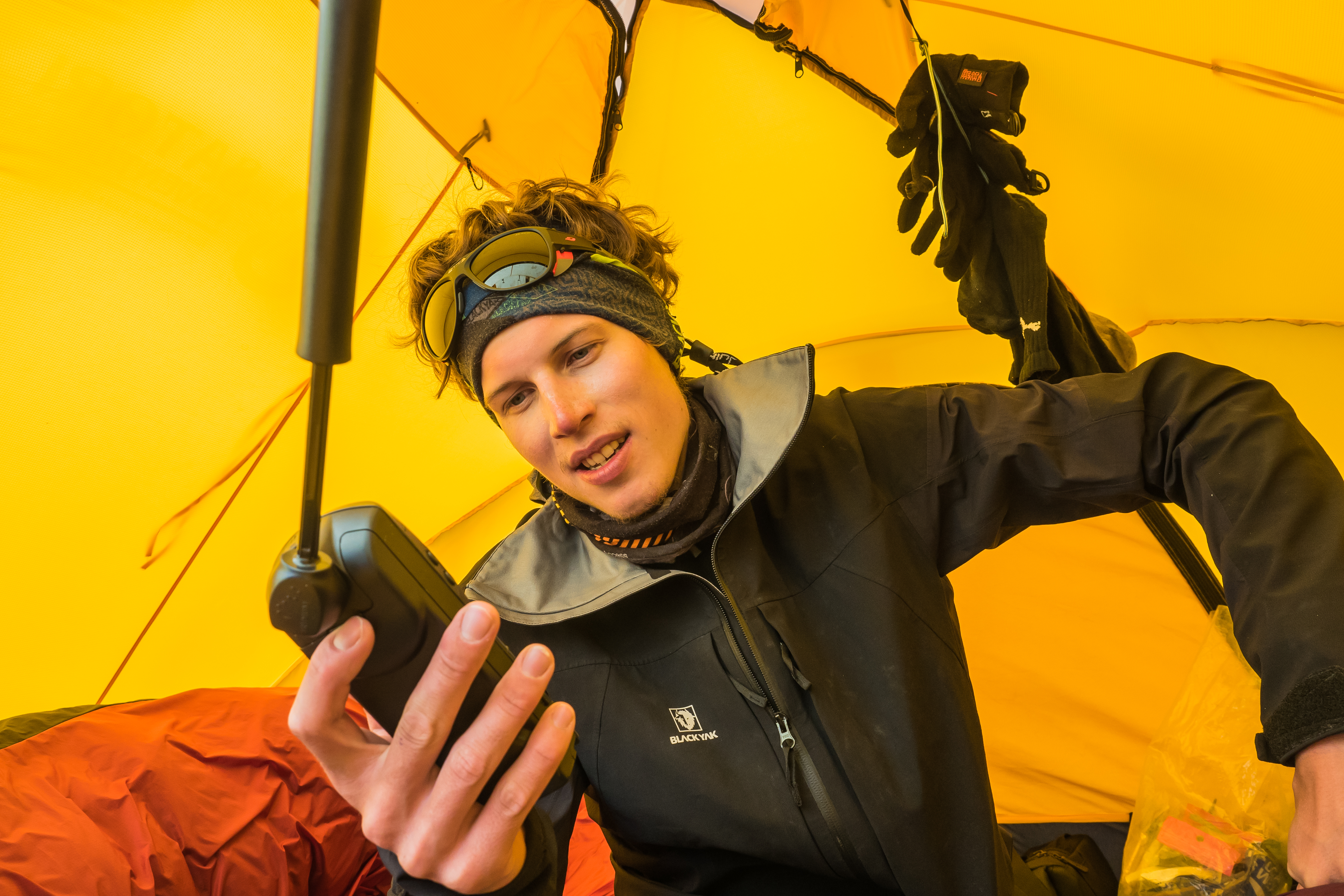
- Kobusch in 2017
- Born: August 3, 1992 (age 34); Bielefeld, Germany
- Education: Technische Universität Chemnitz
- Occupations: Mountaineer, author

Jost Kobusch (born August 3, 1992, in Bielefeld) is a German mountaineer and author.

== Early life ==
Kobusch grew up in Borgholzhausen and, after an early divorce of his parents, was raised by his father, a carpenter. At the age of twelve, he started to participate in climbing courses organized by his school. After his Abitur, he joined the Bundeswehr as a Gebirgsjäger (mountain troops). Since 2016, Kobusch is living in Chemnitz as a student of the Technische Universität Chemnitz.

== Mountaineering ==
In 2013, Kobusch traveled to Kyrgyzstan. Due to inclement weather he was unable to reach the top of Pik Lenin, however, he succeeded to become the first to ascent a mountain he subsequently named, Pik Yoko (4,048 m). In April 2014, he became the youngest solo climber of Ama Dablam not using supplemental oxygen.

Kobusch became famous when he filmed the partial destruction of the Mount Everest base camp by an avalanche on April 25, 2015 that had been triggered by the April 2015 Nepal earthquake.

On May 1, 2016, Kobusch reached the top of Annapurna (8,091 m) without oxygen support.

In 2017, Kobusch was the first to reach the top of Nangpai Gosum II (7,296 m); he was solo and did not use supplemental oxygen. For this ascent, he was nominated by Piolet d'Or for its annual "Significant Ascents" award.

In the winter of 2019/2020, Kobusch attempted his first solo Mount Everest ascent without supplemental oxygen, but had to give up at 7,360 m. His second attempt to ascent Mount Everest solo and without supplemental oxygen started in the winter of 2021/2022. Kobusch chose a route over the West Ridge avoiding the Khumbu Icefall. According to Krzysztof Wielicki, who did the first winter ascent of Mount Everest using the standard route, his chances of success would be 50/50. Being exposed to almost continuous bad weather that wrecked five tents, Kobush was not able to get to the top but intended to return in 2 years for another attempt.

== Ascents (selection) ==
- 2014: Ama Dablam, solo, no supplemental oxygen
- 2016: Annapurna, no supplemental oxygen
- 2017: Nangpai Gosum II, solo, no supplemental oxygen
- 2018: New route Way of the Ancestors to reach Carstensz-Pyramide
- 2019: First ascent of Amotsang (6,393 m), Damodar Himalaya
- 2021: First ascent of Purbung (6,465 m) with Nicolas Scheidtweiler
- 2023: Denali - solo winter ascent via Messner Couloir

== Writings ==
- Ich. Oben. Allein. Riva, 2017, ISBN 978-3-7423-0079-9
- Reinhold Messner: Mord am Unmöglichen. Edited by Luca Calvi and Alessandro Filippini, Malik, 2018, ISBN 978-3890295138. Chapter Jost Kobusch: Es wird immer Neues zu entdecken geben, Pages 188-192 (, p. PT188, at Google Books)
- Reinhold Messner: „Gehe ich nicht, gehe ich kaputt.“ Briefe aus dem Himalaja. Malik, 2020, ISBN 978-3890295022, Chapter Jost Kobusch: Mount. Everest. Base Camp, January 2, 2020, Page 386 (, p. PT386, at Google Books)
