= Manang Airport =

Manang Airport मनाङ्ग विमानस्थल
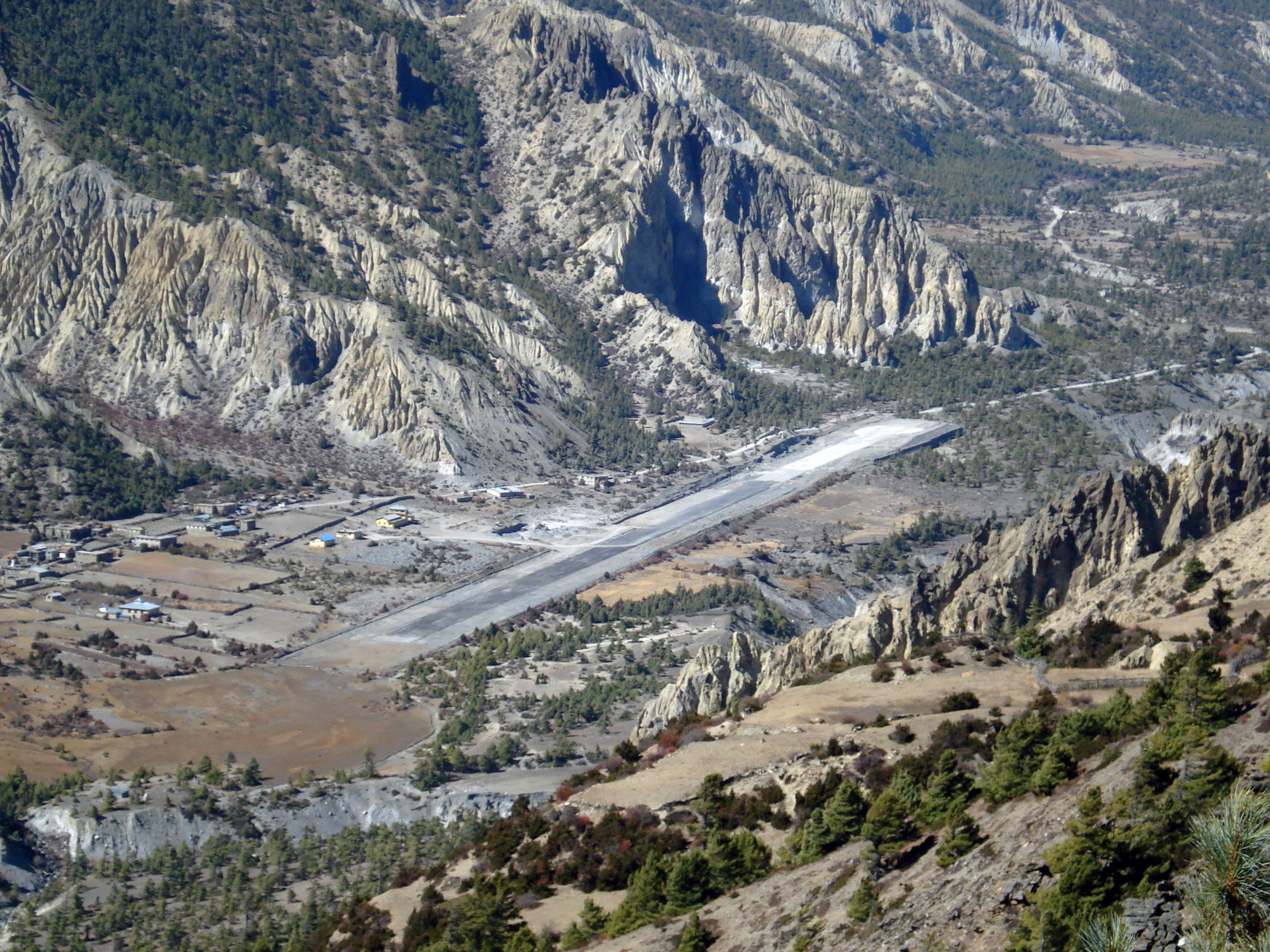
- IATA: NGX; ICAO: VNMA

Summary
- Airport type: Public
- Owner: Government of Nepal
- Operator: Civil Aviation Authority of Nepal
- Serves: Manang, Nepal
- Elevation AMSL: 11,000 ft / 3,353 m
- Coordinates: 28°38′28.03″N 84°05′16.94″E

Map
- Location of airport in Nepal

Runways
Direction	Length		Surface
Direction	m	ft	Surface
11/29	650	2,133	Asphalt

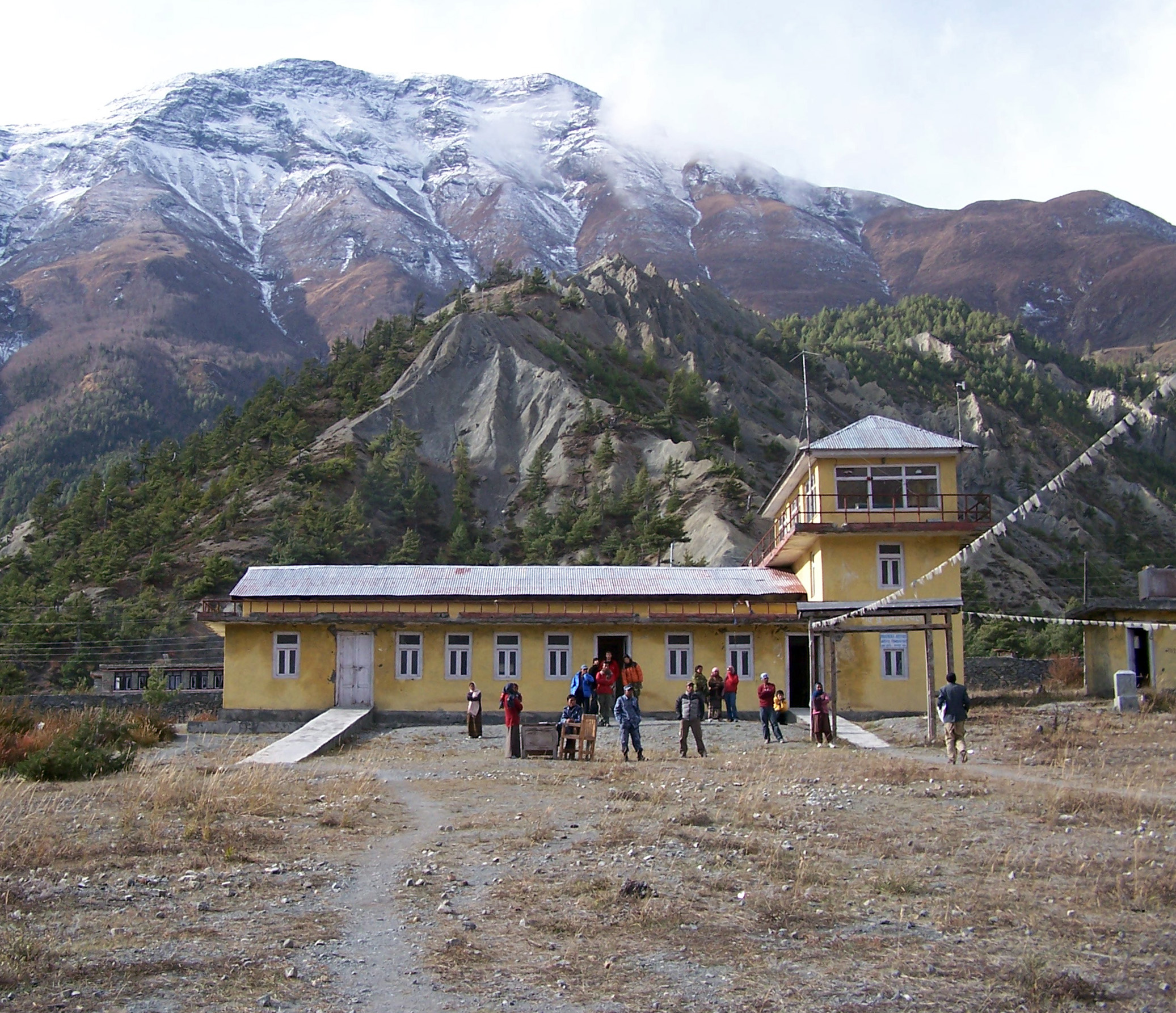
Airport terminal

Manang Airport (Nepali: मनाङ्ग विमानस्थल, IATA: NGX, ICAO: VNMA) is a domestic airport located in Manang serving Manang District, a district in Gandaki Province in Nepal. Situated at an elevation of 11,000 feet (3,353 m) above mean sea level, it is one of the highest airports in the world and the highest one in Nepal.

== History ==
The airport started operations on 28 February 1981. In 2015, the airport was renovated and the runway was blacktopped.

== Facilities ==
The airport has one runway which is 650 metres (2,133 ft) in length.

== Airlines and destinations ==
Since 2012, there are no scheduled services to and from Manang Airport. Previously Nepal Airlines and Tara Air operated routes to Pokhara.
