= Milarepa (disambiguation) =

Milarepa is considered one of Tibet's most famous yogis and poets.

Milarepa may also refer to:

- Milarepa (1973 film), an Italian film
- Milarepa (2006 film), a Tibetan film
- Milarepa Fund
- Milarepa (2025 film), an Italian film

== See also ==
- Milarepa's Cave (disambiguation)
