= Chulu East =

Mountain in Nepal

Chulu
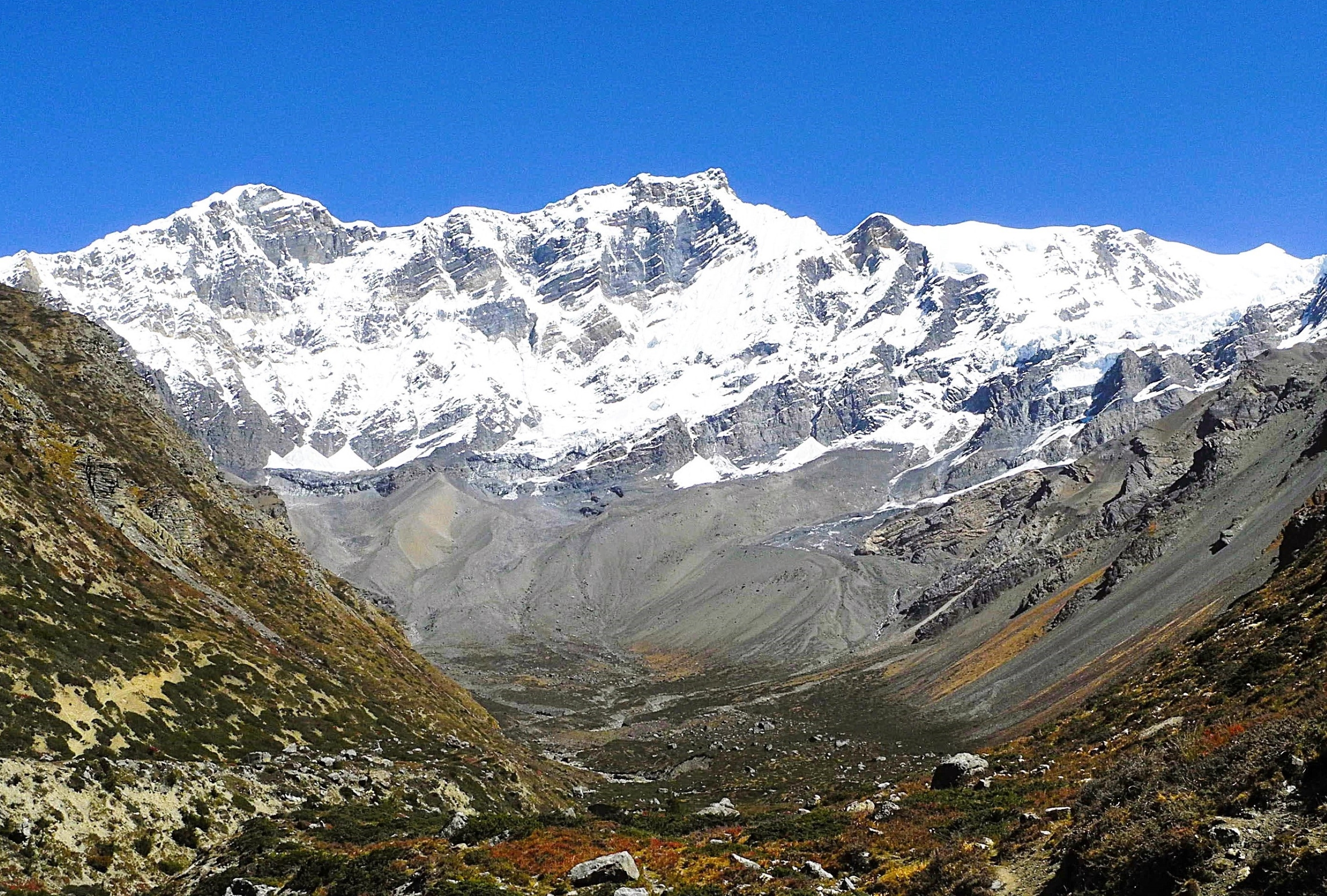
- Southwest aspect

Highest point
- Elevation: 6,584 m (21,601 ft)
- Prominence: 1,034 m (3,392 ft)
- Parent peak: Nemjung
- Isolation: 14.26 km (8.86 mi)
- Listing: Mountains of Nepal
- Coordinates: 28°44′10″N 84°02′05″E

Geography
- Location within Nepal
- Interactive map of Chulu
- Country: Nepal
- Province: Gandaki
- District: Manang
- Protected area: Annapurna Conservation Area
- Parent range: Himalayas; Damodar Himalaya

Climbing
- First ascent: 1955

Chulu, also known as Chulu East, is a mountain in Nepal.

== Description ==
Chulu is a 6,584-metre (21,601-foot) glaciated summit in the Nepalese Himalayas. It is situated seven kilometres (4.3 mi) north of Manang in Gandaki Province. Precipitation runoff from the mountain's slopes drains into tributaries of the Marshyangdi River. Topographic relief is significant as the west face rises 1,300 metres (4,265 ft) in one kilometre (0.62 mi). The Annapurna Circuit traverses the valley below the west slopes of this peak. This peak along with outliers Chulu West (6,419 m) and Chulu Far East (6,060 m) are on the list of permitted trekking peaks. The first ascent of the summit was made on July 23, 1955, by Heinz Steinmetz, Harald Biller, Fritz Lobbichler, and Jürgen Wellenkamp. The first ascent of Chulu West was made on October 23, 1952, by Kinji Imanishi, Kazuhiko Hayashi, Sasuke Nakao, Jiro Taguchi, Masataka Takagi, and Sakuta Takebushi.

== Climate ==
Based on the Köppen climate classification, Chulu is located in a tundra climate zone with cold, snowy winters, and cool summers. Weather systems are forced upwards by the Himalaya mountains (orographic lift), causing heavy precipitation in the form of rainfall and snowfall. Mid-June through early-August is the monsoon season. The months of April, May, September, and October offer the most favorable weather for viewing or climbing this peak.

== Gallery ==
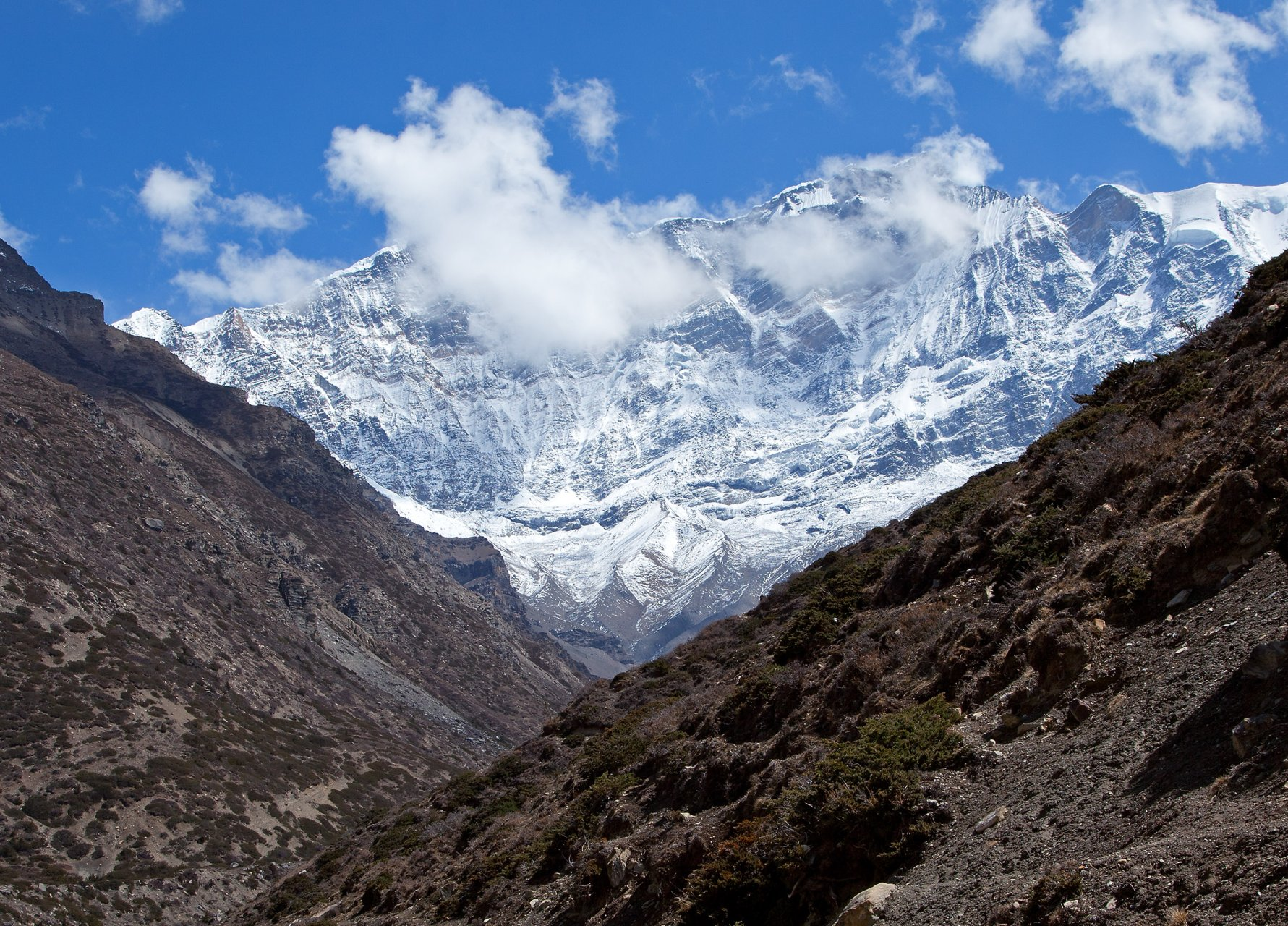
Southwest aspect

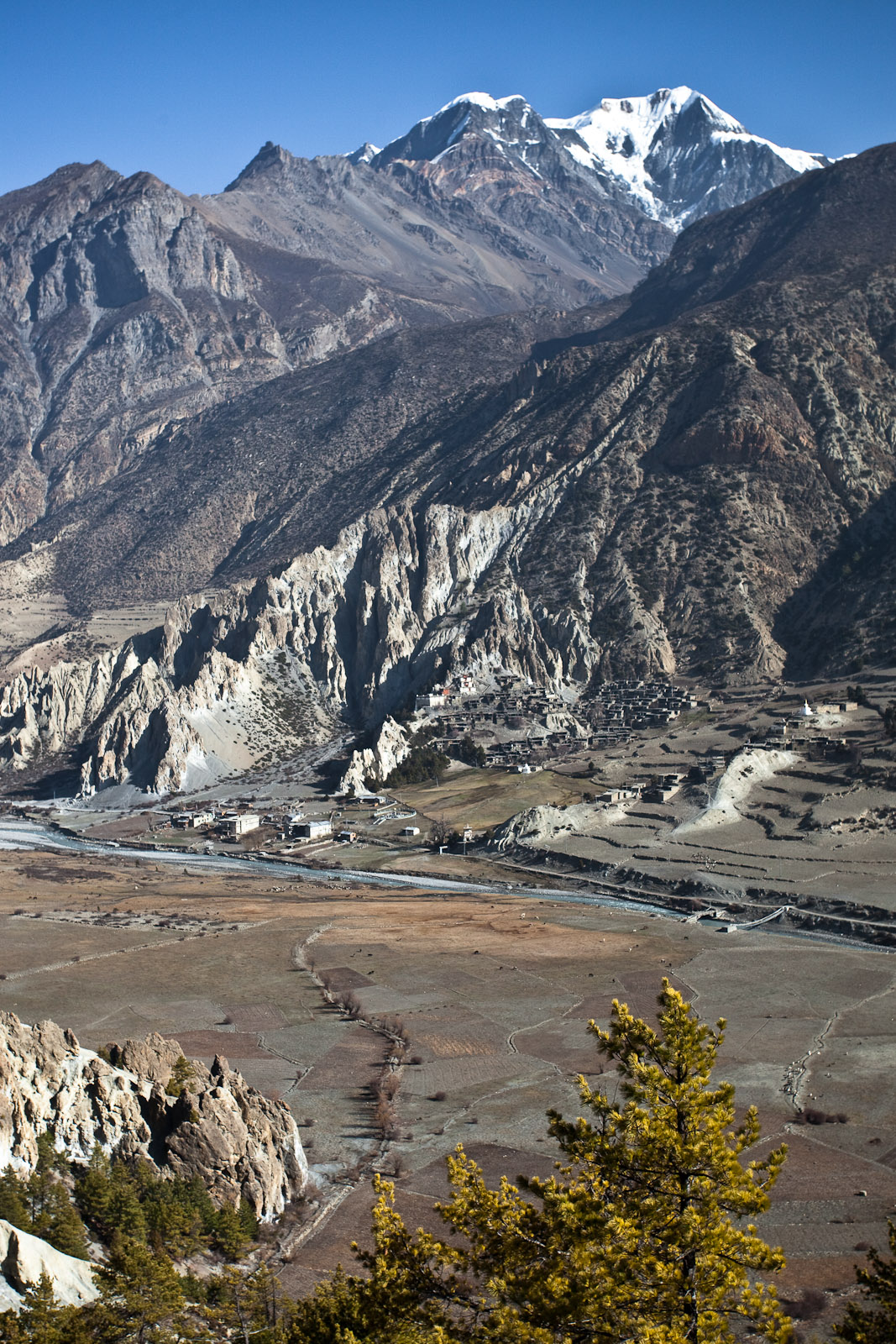
South aspect

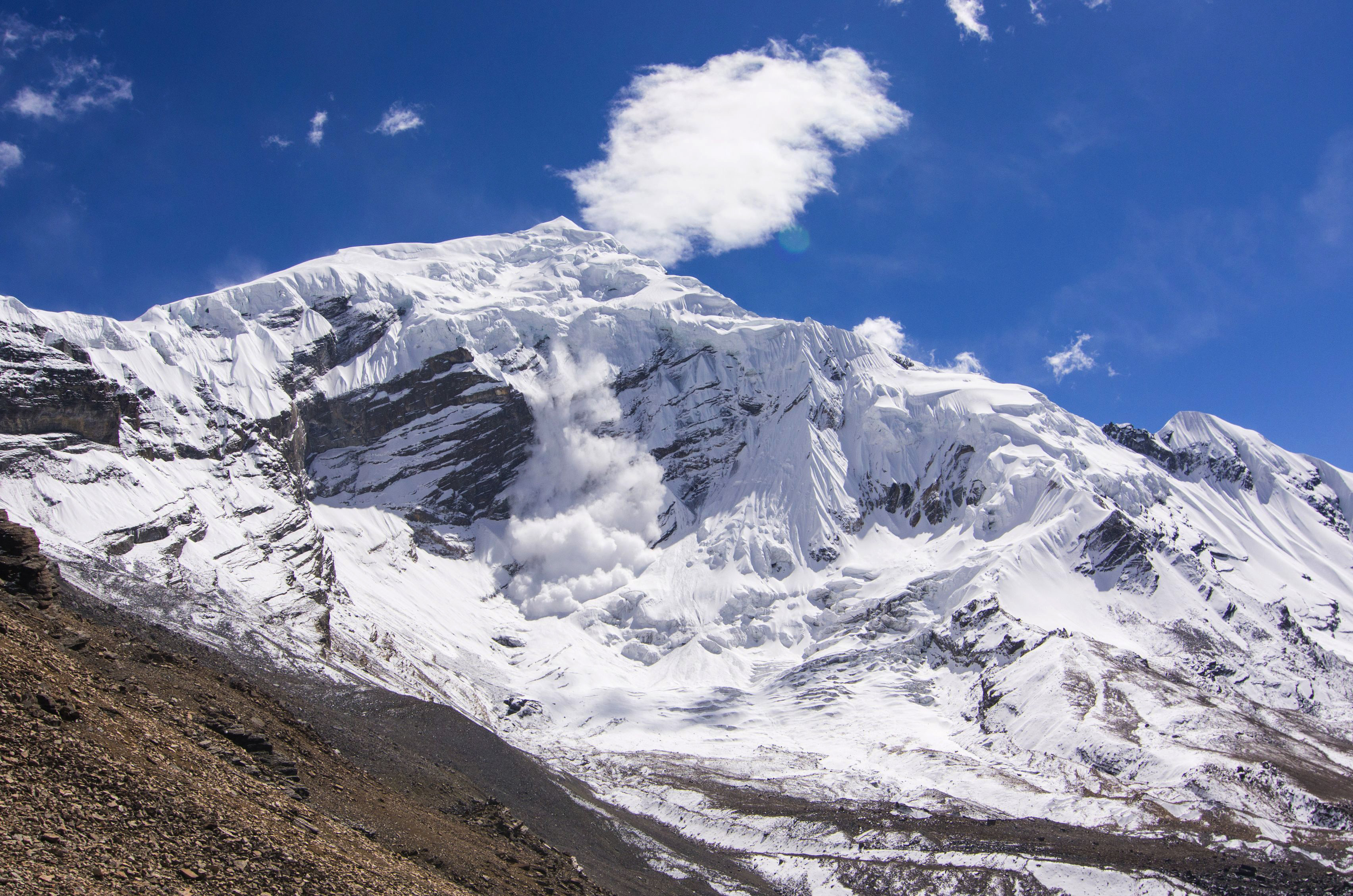
Chulu West from northwest

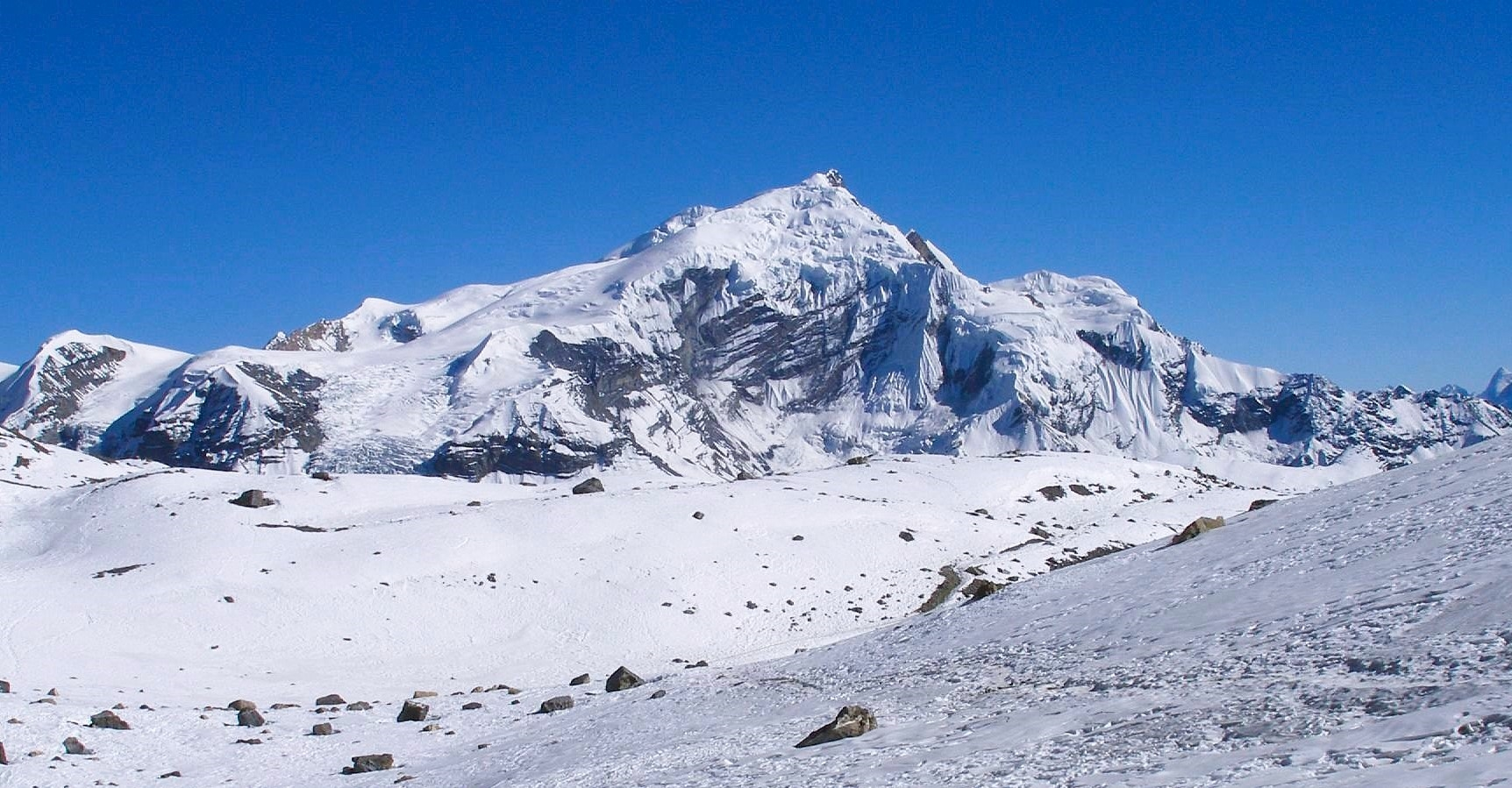
Chulu West (6419m) viewed from Thorong La pass

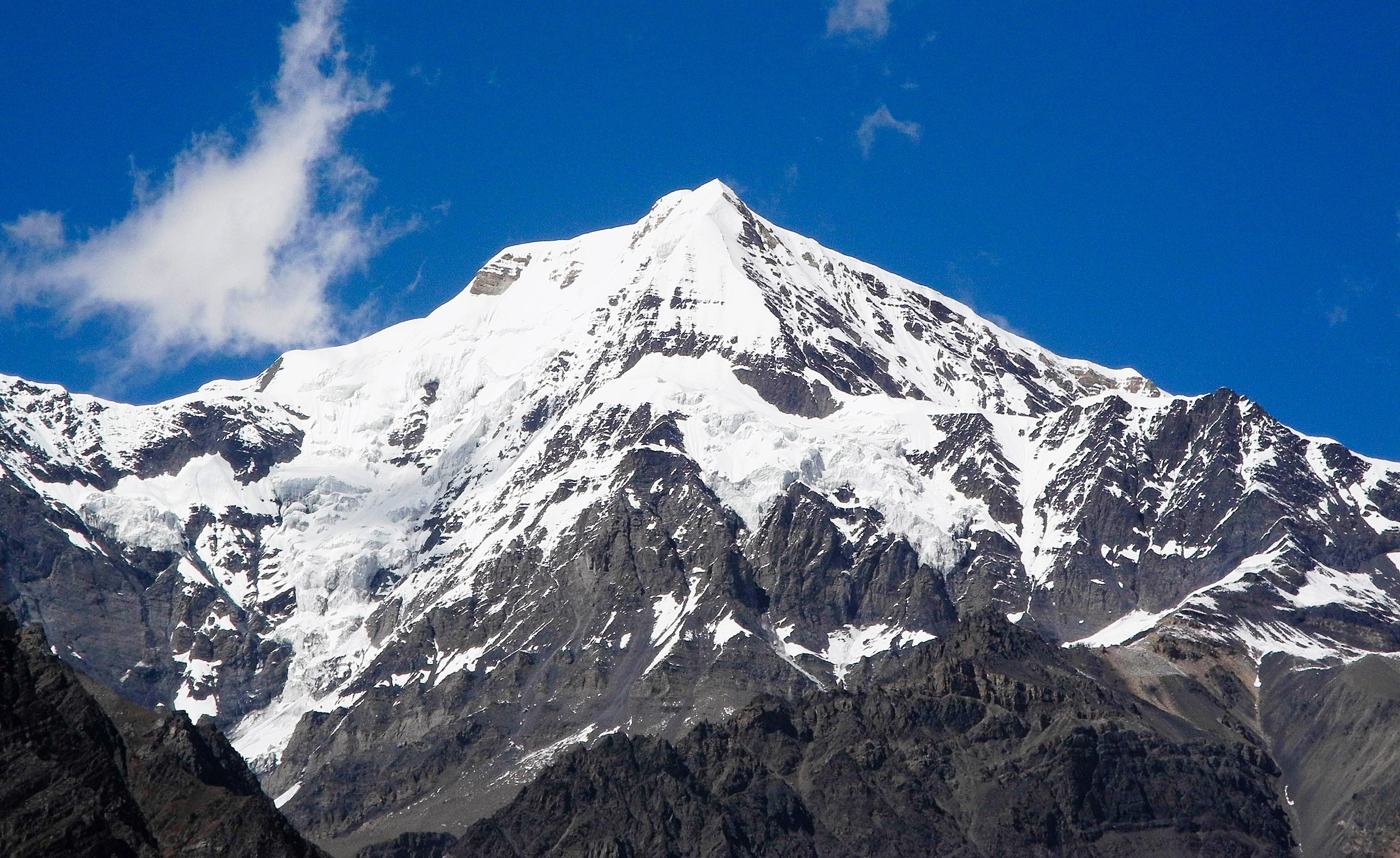
South aspect of Peak 6429

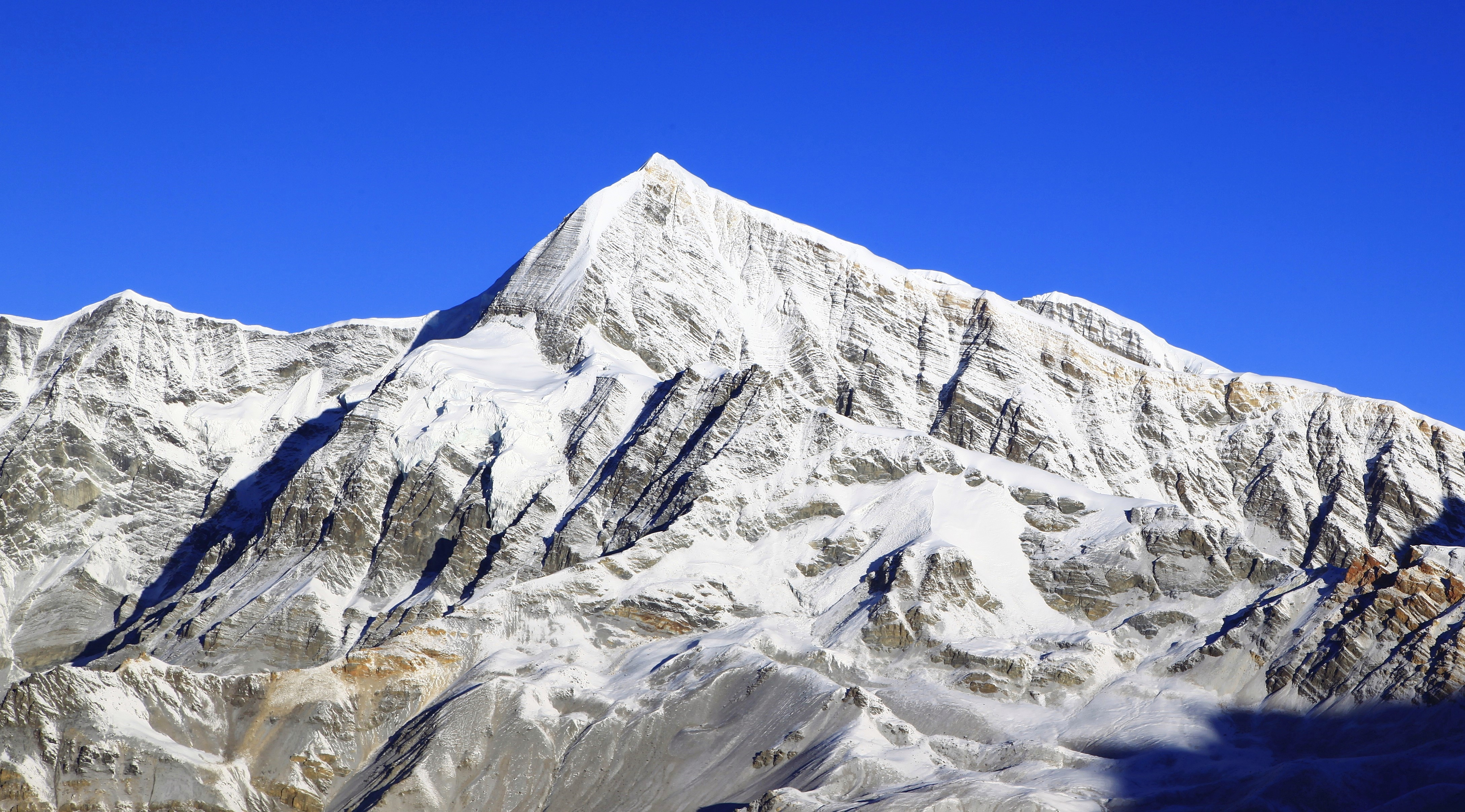
South aspect of Peak 6429

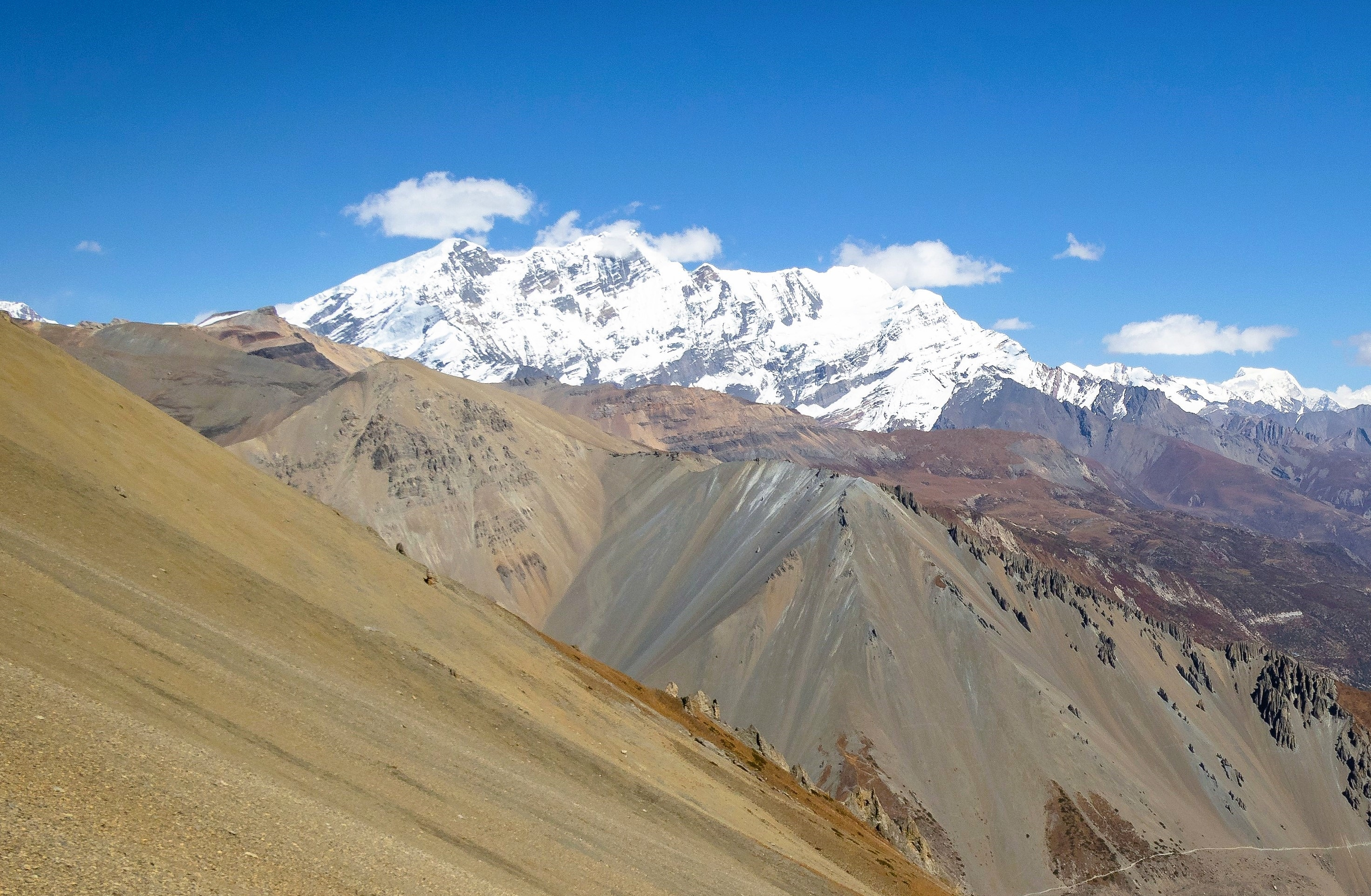
Chulu from the west

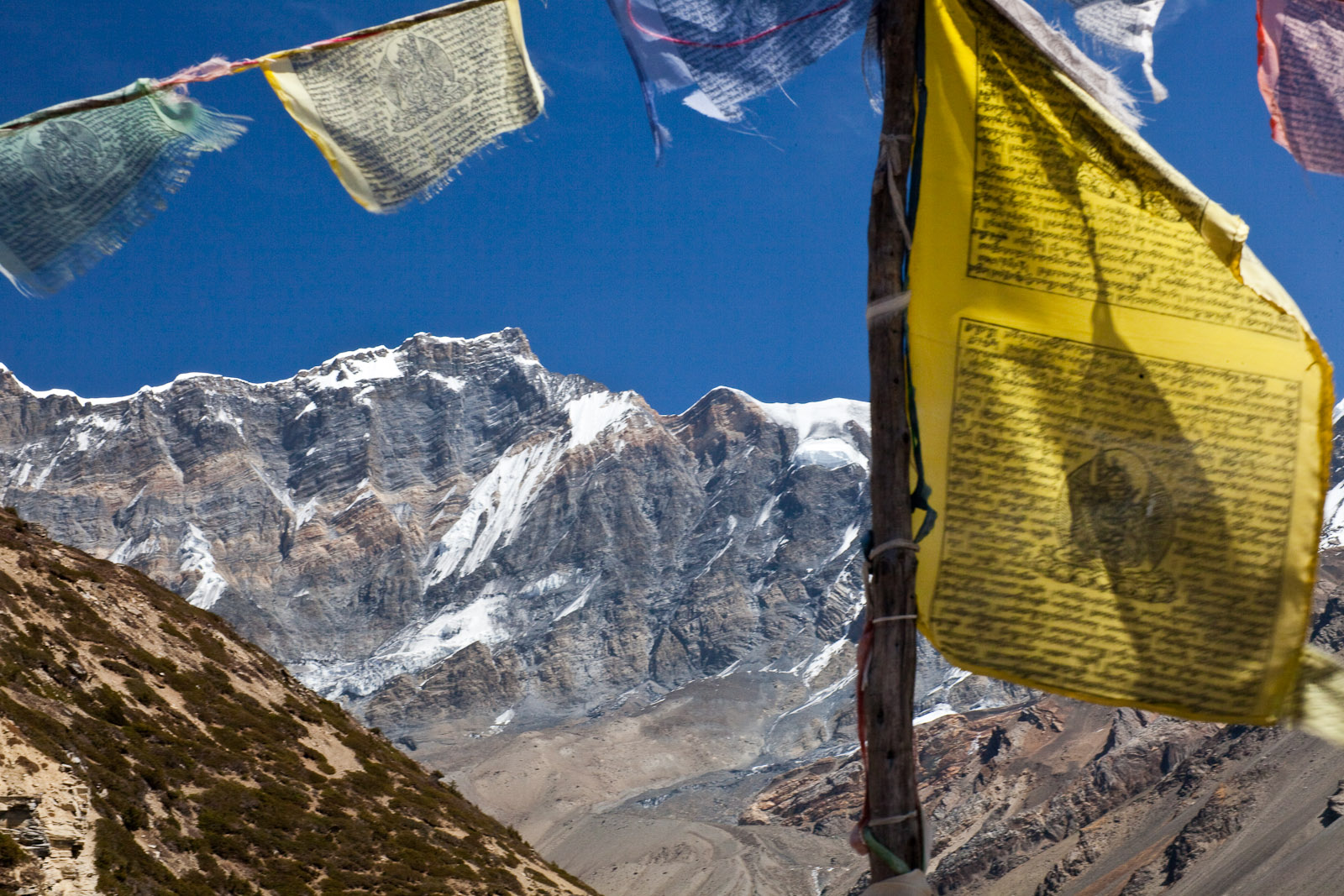

== See also ==
- Geology of the Himalayas
