= Milarepa's Cave, Nyalam =

Cave in Nyalam County, Tibet

Milarepa's Cave
- མི་ལ་རས་པའི་བྲག་ཕུག
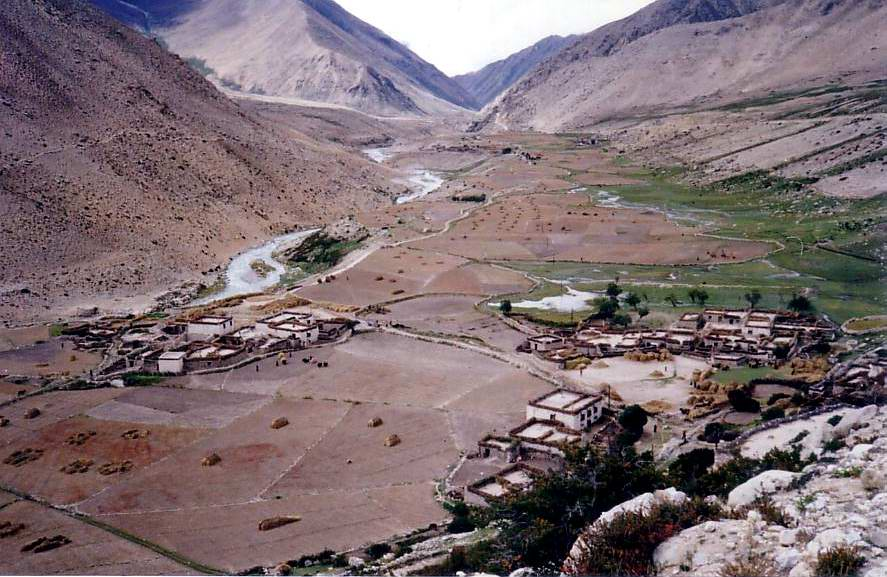
- View overlooking Phelgyeling Monastery at Milarepa's Cave, Tibet

- Location within Tibet

Religion
- Affiliation: Tibetan Buddhism
- Sect: Gelug
- Patron: Milarepa

Location
- Location: Gangka village, Nyalam County, Shigatse, Tibet
- Coordinates: 28.2417°N 86.0077°E

- Milarepa's Cave

Tibetan name
- Tibetan: མི་ལ་རས་པའི་བྲག་ཕུག
Transcriptions
- Wylie: mi la ras pa'i brag phug

Chinese name
- Traditional Chinese: 米拉日巴修行洞
- Simplified Chinese: 米拉日巴修行洞
Transcriptions
Standard Mandarin
- Hanyu Pinyin: Mǐlārèbā xiūxíng dòng

- Nyalam Pelgye Ling

Tibetan name
- Tibetan: གཉའ་ལམ་འཕེལ་རྒྱས་གླིང་
Transcriptions
- Wylie: gnya' lam 'phel rgyas gling
- THL: Nyalam Pelgyé Ling

Chinese name
- Traditional Chinese: 潘杰林寺
- Simplified Chinese: 潘杰林寺
Transcriptions
Standard Mandarin
- Hanyu Pinyin: Pānjiélín sì

Milarepa's Cave or Namkading Cave is a cave where the Tibetan Buddhist philosopher, and Vajrayana Mahasiddha, Milarepa (c. 1052–c. 1135 CE) spent many years of his life in the eleventh century. It is located 11 kilometres (7 mi) north of the town of Nyalam at Gangka village. It is on the slope below the China–Nepal Friendship Highway and above the Matsang river in Nyalam County, Tibet.

== Phelgyeling Monastery ==
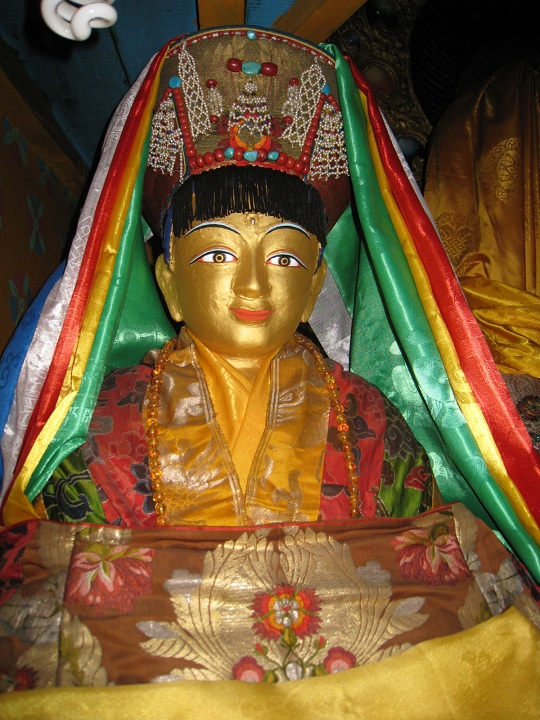
Statute of Milarepa from Phelgyeling Monastery

A path leads down from the roadside through the village and down a hillside where there is a small monastery (gompa) named Nyanang Pelgye Ling Monastery, or Phelgyeling which is built around the cave. The monastery's assembly hall has the statue, 7 feet (2 m) in height, of Shakyamuni Buddha in the center.

The monastery used to be a Kagyupa but later was converted to a Gelugpa by the 5th Dalai Lama. Later, Phelgyeling Monastery was affiliated with the Gelugpa Sera Monastery in Lhasa.

A separate Nyanang Phelgye Ling Monastery was set up by the Tibetan diaspora in Nepal in foothills of Swayambhunath, Kathmandu. Many holy relics were brought from Tibet by fleeing monks during the 1959 Tibetan uprising, which was suppressed by the Chinese government. The Kathmandu monastery was constructed in 1972. The relocated relics are now safely kept in this monastery.

== Description of the cave ==
Milarepa's Cave, which overlooks the entrance to the hidden valley of Lapchi Gang, is entered from the gompa's vestibule. The path is flanked by pilgrim's offerings of decorated stones and sweet-smelling herbs and wild flowers growing all around. The cave itself is kept as a shrine by two monks, guarding a statue of Milarepa enclosed in a glass case. In the cave is an impression in the rock attributed to Milarepa's sitting meditation posture and a handprint said to have been created when Milarepa helped Rechungpa (1083/4–1161 CE), his student, use a boulder to prop up the ceiling. There are images of Milarepa, Tsongkhapa, and Shri Devi, a protectress whose mule is said to have left a footprint in the stone when she visited Milarepa in a vision.

Restoration work within the cave and the monastery was undertaken by artists and craftsmen from Nepal and was financed in the 1970s by the Chinese government.

== In art ==
The cave and the Pelgye Ling temple were the subject of Richard Gere's artistic photo work, Milarepa's Cave, Nyelam Pelgye Ling Temple, Tibet (1993).

== Associated caves ==
There are many more caves associated with Milarepa in Tibet and Nepal. There is the Milarepa Cave in Gandaki, Nepal on the Annapurna Circuit just outside of the town of Manang.

Another notable one is close to Lar in the Tsum Valley at the border with Tibet, 28.52°N / 85.08°E, alt 3330 m. It features the print in rock of Milarepa's foot. It can be visited and there are two shrines on the site. Buddhist presence in this valley developed around Milarepa's time, as the gompa in Dephu Donma monastery, up the valley, dates back to the 12th century AD.
