= Damodar Himalaya =

Mountain range in Nepal

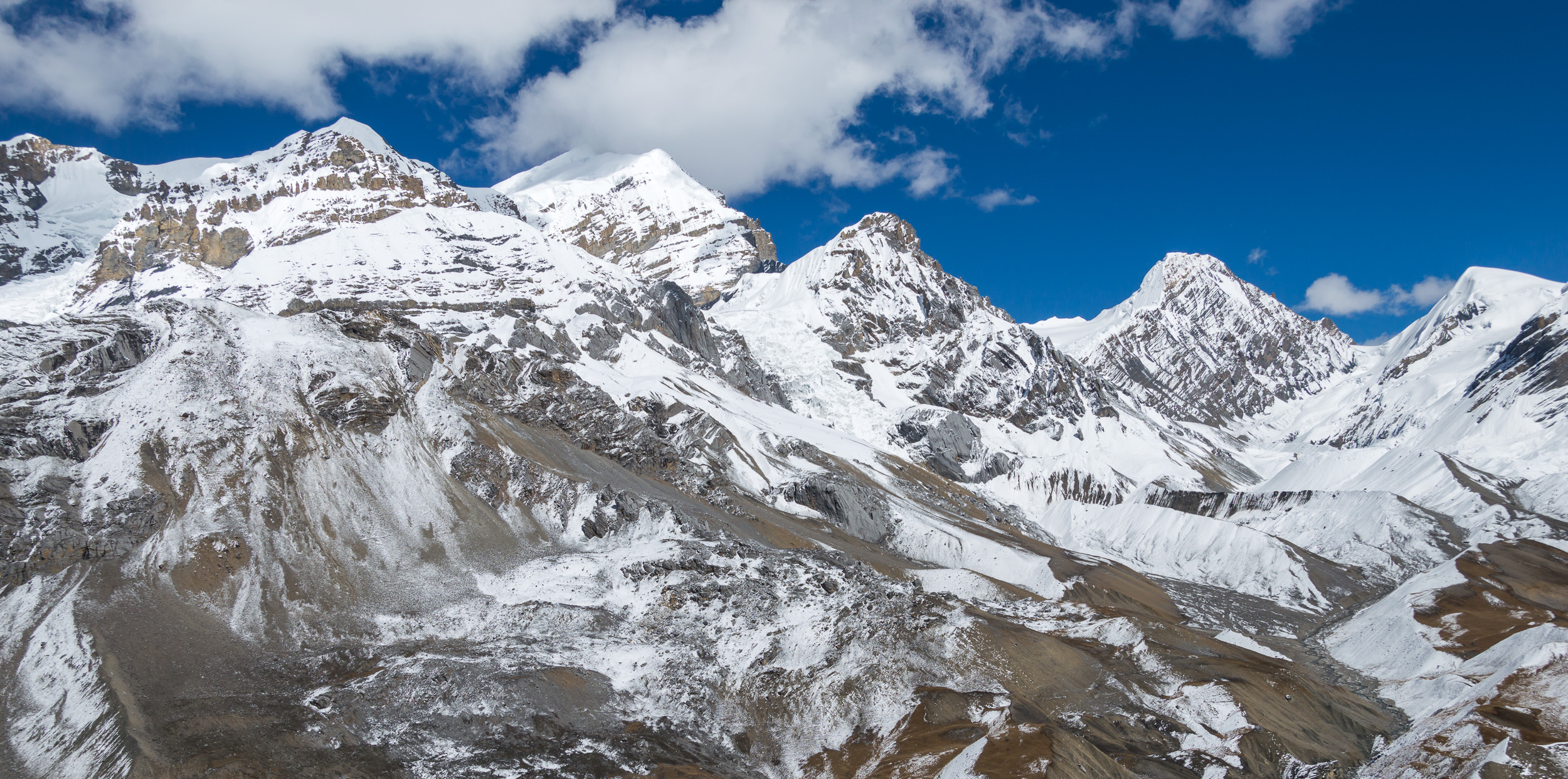
- Damodar Himalaya viewed from Thorong High Camp

Highest point
- Peak: Khumjung Himal
- Elevation: 6,699 m (21,978 ft)
- Coordinates: 28°53′20″N 84°07′45″E

Naming
- Native name: दामोदर हिमालय (Nepali)

Geography
- Location within Nepal
- Country: Nepal
- Province: Gandaki
- Parent range: Himalayas

Damodar Himalaya (Nepali: दामोदर हिमालय) is a mountain range in Gandaki Province, Nepal.

== Peaks ==
Name of peak	Height (m)	Coordinates	Ref(s)
Amotsang	6,392 metres (20,971 ft)	28.835394742625486°N 84.172397733516°E	
Araniko Chuli	6,039 metres (19,813 ft)	29.17615756251543°N 83.6594613343062°E	
Bhrikuti	6,476 metres (21,247 ft)	28.91935107376957°N 84.14736542363347°E	
Bhrikuti Shail	6,364 metres (20,879 ft)	28.893343093773453°N 84.22685552975946°E	
Chhib Himal	6,581 metres (21,591 ft)	28.873268771122827°N 84.16227017247965°E	
Chulu East	6,584 metres (21,601 ft)	28.736192975697527°N 84.03279900636491°E	
Chulu West	6,419 metres (21,060 ft)	28.743333°N 84.025000°E	
Dhechyan Khang	6,019 metres (19,747 ft)	29.036151615523053°N 84.24915699336037°E	
Gaugiri	6,110 metres (20,050 ft)	29.04539653943792°N 84.19005815352727°E	
Ghyun Himal I	6,099 metres (20,010 ft)	29.2441933406522°N 83.78196841649864°E	
Hongde	6,556 metres (21,509 ft)	28.84648346608248°N 83.4989498134812°E	
Jijang	6,111 metres (20,049 ft)	28.783955231314177°N 84.03444428265786°E	
Jomsom Himal	6,581 metres (21,591 ft)	28.841007750497354°N 84.15586594845385°E	
Kang Kuru	6,355 metres (20,850 ft)	28.901576720151233°N 84.18587506837511°E	
Kesang Khang	6,063 metres (19,892 ft)	28.91892573986248°N 84.14512451180791°E	
Khumjung Himal	6,699 metres (21,978 ft)	28.888903857539532°N 84.12913154568854°E	
Mansail	6,242 metres (20,479 ft)	29.30187170515267°N 83.81515884760971°E	
Mansail South	6,251 metres (20,509 ft)	29.294549309413014°N 83.81023830999636°E	
Mustang Himal	6,195 metres (20,325 ft)	29.286195584956328°N 83.81054268022298°E	
Nar Phu	5,748 metres (18,858 ft)	28.716976933635706°N 84.12390456610146°E	
Pisang	6,091 metres (19,984 ft)	28.643507581287373°N 84.19662009760808°E	
Pokhar Khang	6,348 metres (20,827 ft)	28.812613863014807°N 84.22904686406238°E	
Purbung	6,500 metres (21,300 ft)	28.80142957807672°N 84.02091202228212°E	
Purkung	6,126 metres (20,098 ft)	28.814674285433014°N 83.99263884426922°E	
Saribung	6,346 metres (20,820 ft)	28.884509486616924°N 84.17413549661367°E	
Yakawa Kang	6,482 metres (21,266 ft)	28.808782113017422°N 83.94494395475166°E	
Lunadhar Khang	5,811 metres (19,065 ft)	29.190448757583635°N 84.16629584170816°E	
Yarsang Khang	5,897 metres (19,347 ft)	29.214183061230955°N 84.19928361468541°E	
