= Milarepa Cave, Gandaki =

Cave in Gandaki Province, Nepal

Milarepa Cave
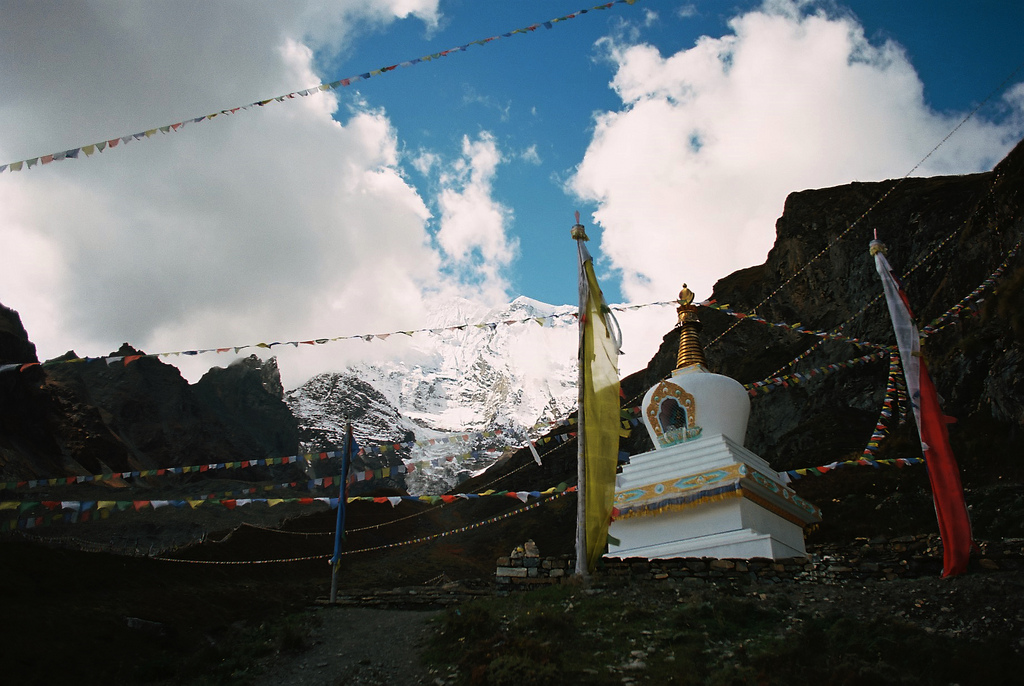
- Stupa near Milarepa Cave

- Location within Nepal

Religion
- Affiliation: Tibetan Buddhism
- Sect: Gelug
- Patron: Milarepa

Location
- Location: Manang District, Gandaki Province, Nepal
- Interactive map of Milarepa Cave
- Coordinates: 28.6369°N 84.0394°E

Architecture
- Elevation: 13,450 ft (4,100 m)

Milarepa Cave or Milerepa Cave is a cave associated with Milarepa in Nepal on the Annapurna Circuit at approximately 13,450 feet (4,100 m) just outside Manang. It is credited to have been the residence of the famous Tibetan Buddhism siddha Milarepa during his stay in 11th century in what is now modern-day northern Nepal. This site also includes a holy spring and a gompa. The cave is located beyond the gompa, with locals praying from the edge of a glacial moraine in direct line of sight of the cave as its approach is on a steep scree slope.

A bow can be seen hanging from the nearby cliff. The bow is purportedly from the local hunter named Kera Gompa Dorjee, who tried to kill Milarepa over an argument about slaying animals. Milarepa taught the hunter causation and compassion through a Buddhist song, which became the classic hymn known as Milarepa's Song to the Hunter. According to local folklore, this is the site of this famous tale.

== See also ==
- Milarepa's Cave, Nyalam
