= Thonje =

- Village
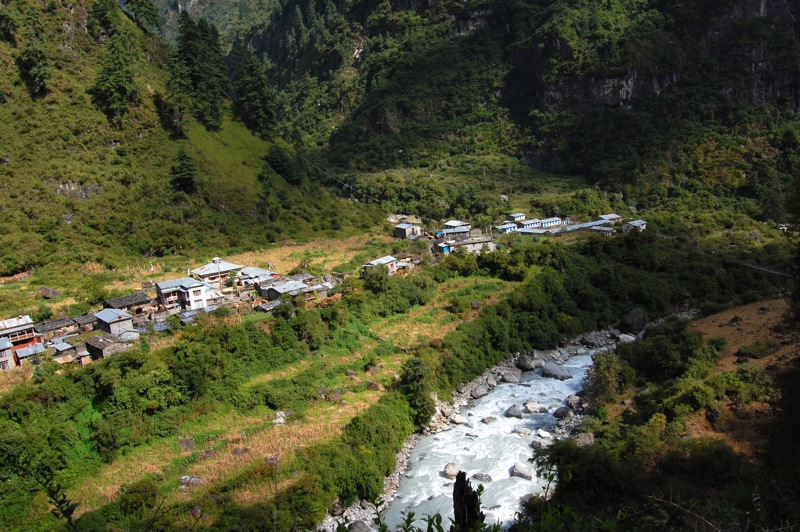

- Location within Nepal Thonje (Nepal)
- Coordinates: 28°31′N 84°21′E
- Country: Nepal
- Time zone: UTC+5.45 (Nepal Standard Time)

Thonje is a village in the Himalayas of northern Nepal. It lies on the Marshyangdi River, in the foothills of Manaslu and Annapurna and is often bypassed on the Annapurna Circuit Trek.
