= Nangpai Gosum =

Mountain in the Himalayas

Coordinates: 28°04′20″N 86°36′52″E

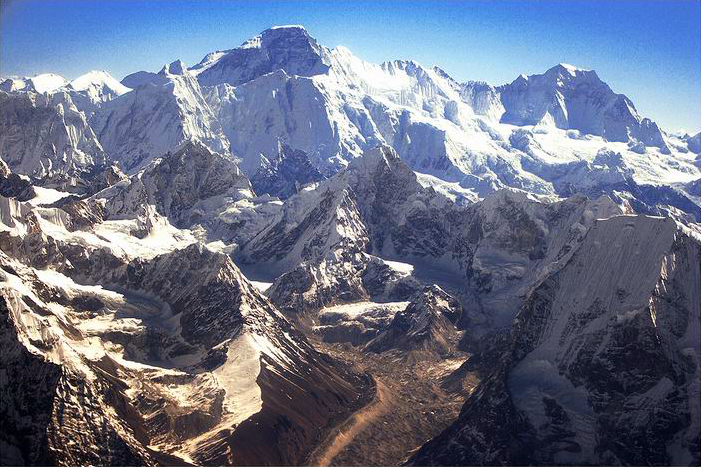

Nangpai Gosum (also known as 'Jasamba') is a mountain in the Himalayas. Its official Nepali name is 'Pasang Lhamu', after the first Sherpani to summit Everest.

It lies on the border between Nepal and China. The total elevation of the mountain is 7,351 m (24,117 ft). The first ascent to the summit was a Japanese expedition on October 12, 1986.

== Peaks ==
Nangpai Gosum has three peaks:

- Nangpai Gosum I – north, the highest – 7,351 m (24,117 ft)
- Nangpai Gosum II – middle – 7296 m
- Nangpai Gosum III – south – 7240 m
