= Nemjung =

Mountain in Nepal

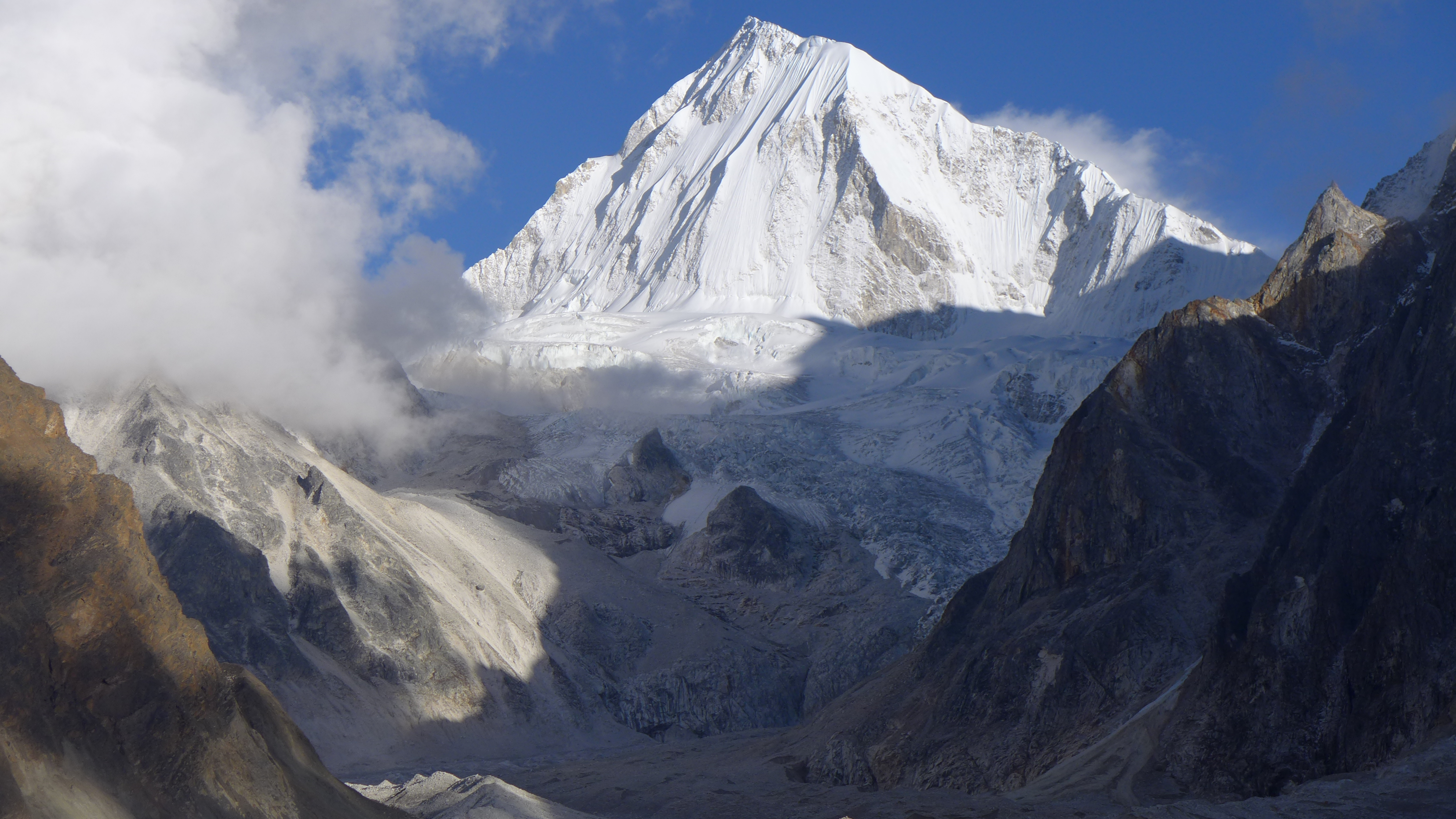

Highest point
- Elevation: 7,140 m (23,430 ft)
- Prominence: 1,920 m (6,300 ft)
- Listing: Mountains of Nepal; Ultra
- Coordinates: 28°44′06″N 84°25′00″E

Geography
- Location within Nepal
- Location: Manang District, Gandaki Zone, North central Nepal
- Parent range: Himalayas

Climbing
- First ascent: 1983 by Nepal and Hirosaki University HIMLUNG HIMAL Joint Expedition Wataru Saito, Makito Minami, Ken Takahashi (Japanese), Kirkin Lama (Nepalese)
- Easiest route: rock/snow/ice climb

Nemjung or Nimjung is a mountain in the Himalayas of Nepal. It is located approximately 150 kilometres (93 mi) northwest of the Nepalese capital Kathmandu and about 25 km (16 mi) northwest of the eight-thousander, Manaslu. Its summit has an elevation of 7,140 metres (23,425 ft). This mountain was once called Himlung Himal.

In the 1990s, a few years after the first ascent in 1983, when demarcating the border with China, the Nepalese government changed the traditional name of Himlung Himal to another mountain about 4 kilometres north. The peak between them is properly called Himjung. Nemjung is the highest among the three peaks of Nemjung (east), Himjung (centre) and Himlung Himal range (west).

Nemjung was first climbed via the east ridge on October 27, 1983, by a joint expedition from Nepal and the Hirosaki University Alpine Club led by Junji Kurotaki. A previous attempt had been made in 1963 by a Japanese expedition from the Den Den Kyushu Alpine Club led by Hisachika Zengyou. Later summits were achieved in 1994 by a British expedition, and in 2009 by a French team. On October 30, 2009, a Japanese team led by Osamu Tanabe summited Nemjung via its previously unclimbed west face and west ridge.

On 27 September 2026, an avalanche struck the mountain's base camp, leaving fifteen people dead and one other missing.

== See also ==
- List of ultras of the Himalayas
