= Manang =

Manang སྨན་གནང་རྫོང ཉི་ཤང Nyeshang
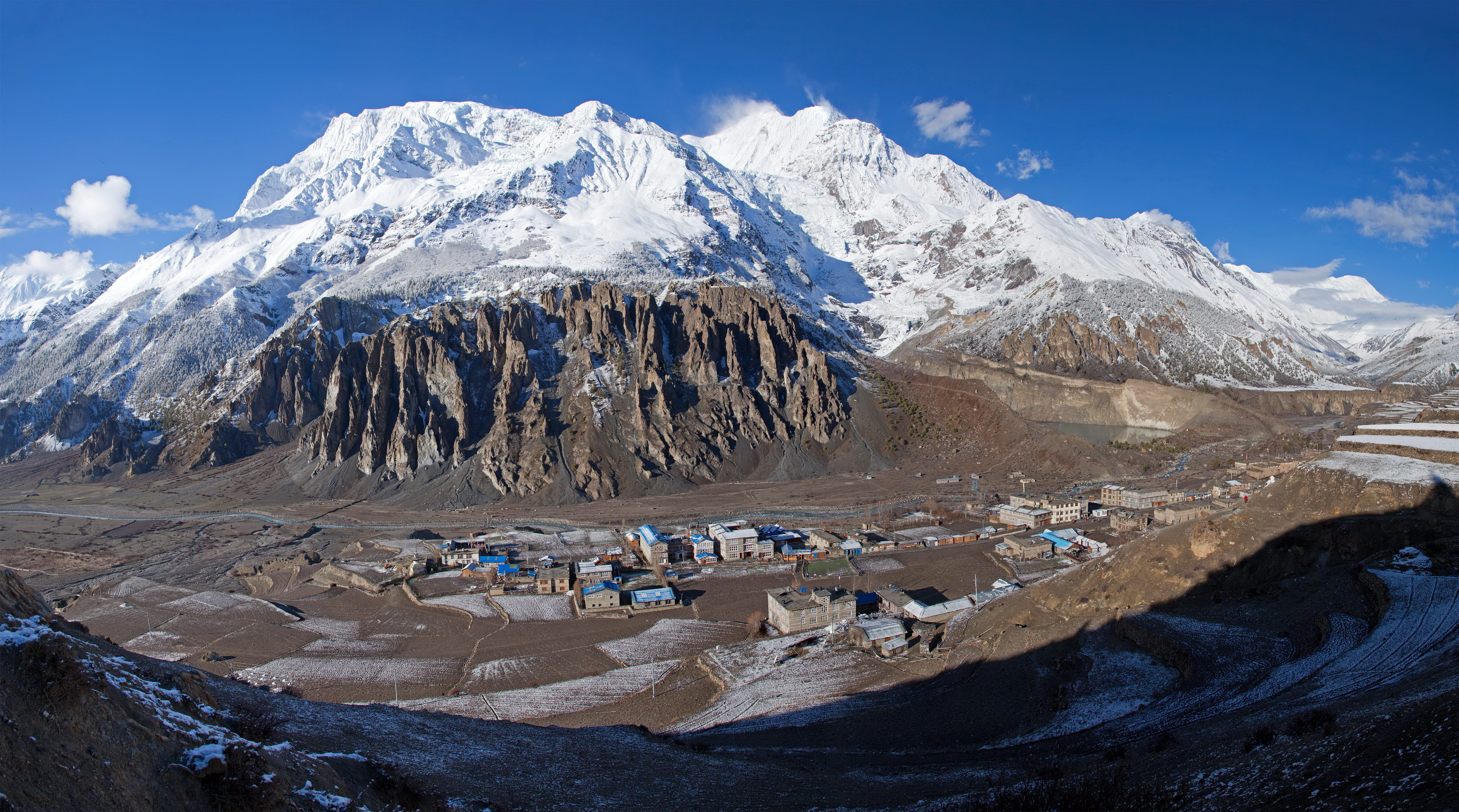
- Manang village. Subpeak (left, 6,747 m) of Annapurna-III and Gangapurna (7,455 m) peaks are in the background.

- Location in Nepal Manang (Nepal)
- Coordinates: 28°40′0″N 84°1′0″E
- Country: Nepal
- Admin. division: Gandaki Province
- District: Manang District
- Elevation: 3,519 m (11,545 ft)

Population (2001)
  - Total: 2,222
- Time zone: UTC+05:45 (Nepal Time)

Manang (Nepali: मनाङ) Sherpa: སྨན་གནང་རྫོང, romanized: Wylie sman snang rzdongis a town in the Manang District of Nepal. It is located at 28°40'0N 84°1'0E with an elevation of 3,519 metres (11,545 ft). According to the preliminary results of the 2011 Nepal census, the district has a population of 6,527 people living in 1,495 individual households. Its population density is 3 persons/km^{2}.

It is situated in the broad valley of the Marshyangdi River to the north of the Annapurna mountain range. The river flows to the east. To the west, the 5,416-metre (17,769 ft) Thorong La pass leads to Muktinath shrine and the valley of the Gandaki River. To the north there is the Chulu East peak of 6,584 m (21,601 ft). Most groups trekking around the Annapurna range take resting days in Manang to acclimatize to the high elevation, before taking on Thorong La pass. The village is situated on the northern slope, which gets the most sunlight and the least snow cover in the winter. The terraced cultivation fields are on the north slope.

There are now motorable road as well as trails where goods are transported on jeep or mule trains or carried by porters. A small airport, located 2.5 km (1.6 mi) east of the town, used to serve the whole valley although it has not had any commercial flights since 2012. The airport was inaugurated in 1985. The development of a trail linking Manang to the Annapurna Conservation Area was finished in February 2011 and has brought many benefits to the villagers and the area.

Besides catering to trekkers, there is some agriculture and the herding of yaks. There is a medical centre, which specializes in high-altitude sickness.

== Gallery ==
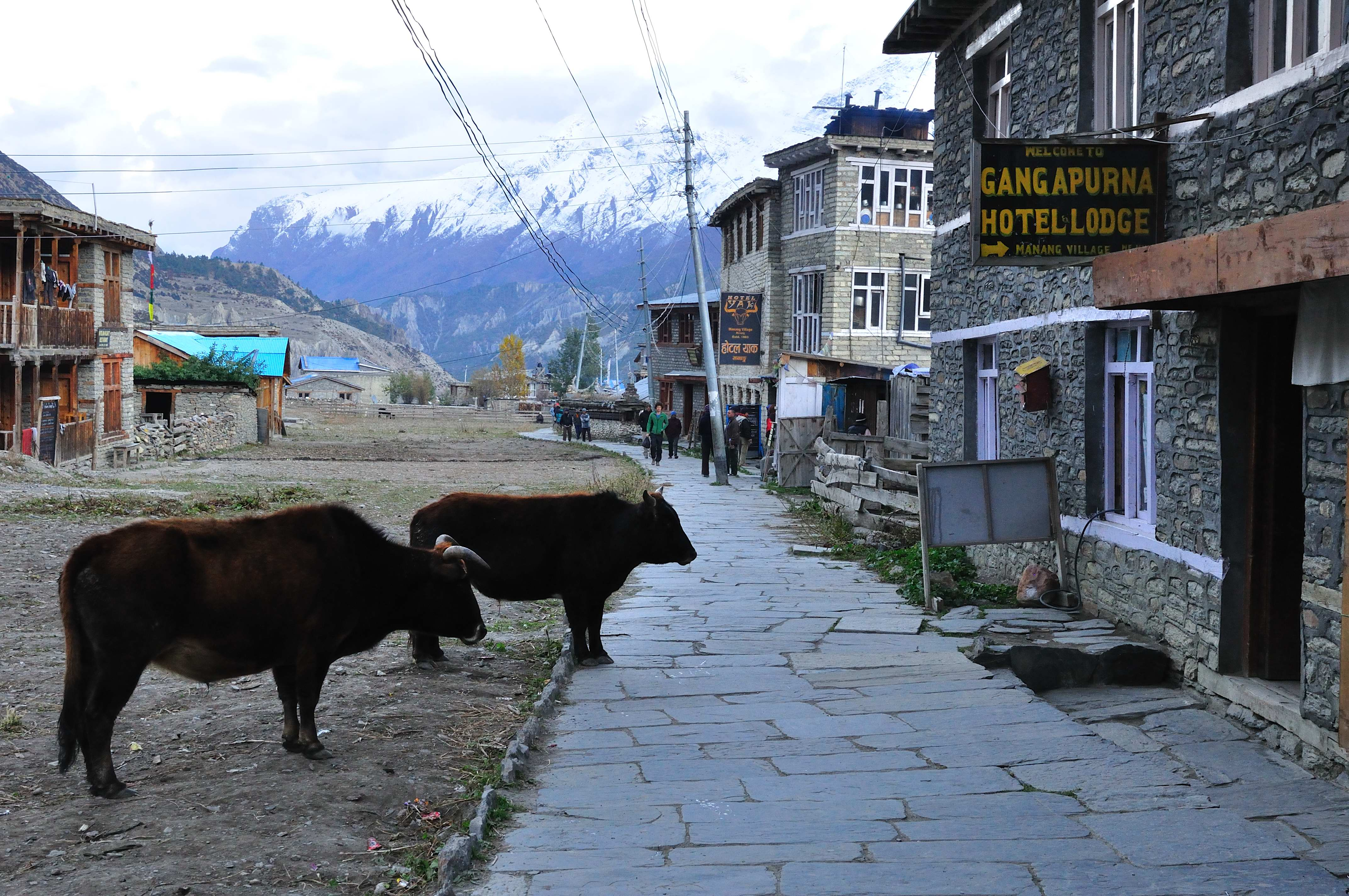
Main street of Manang with yaks

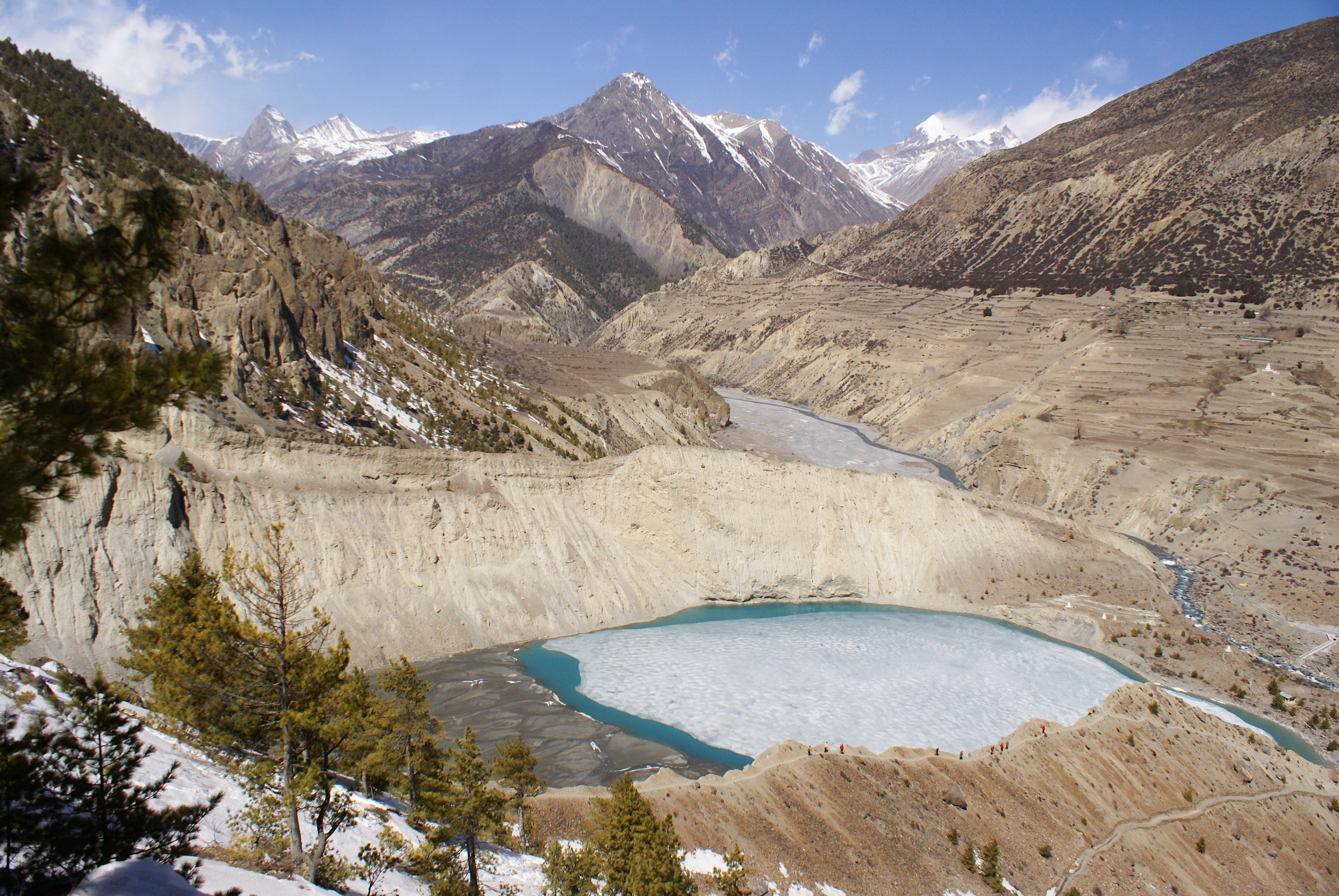
A view of Gangapurna Lake situated at Manang district

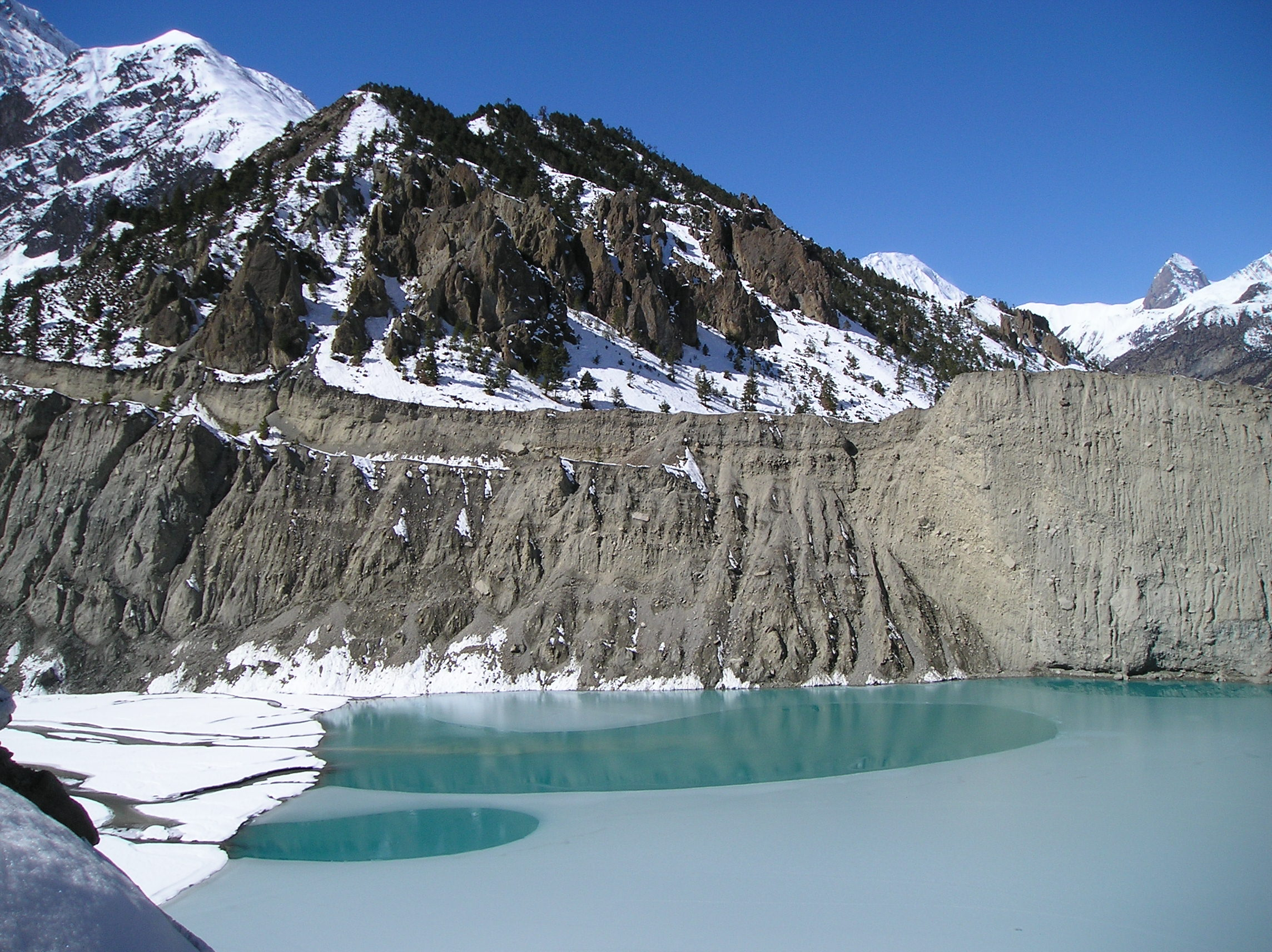
Gangapurna Lake close to Manang

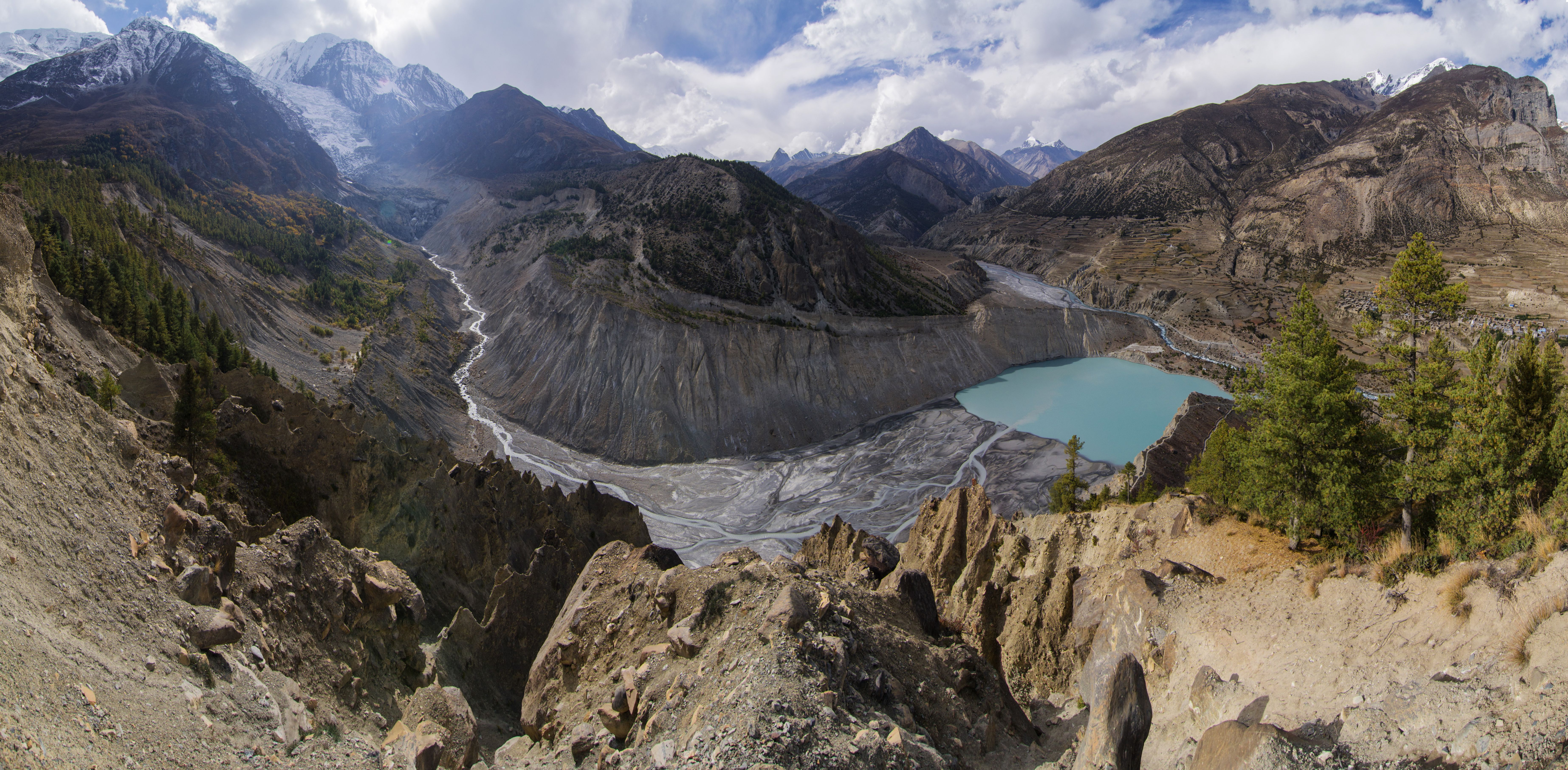
Gangapurna glacier and lake near Manang

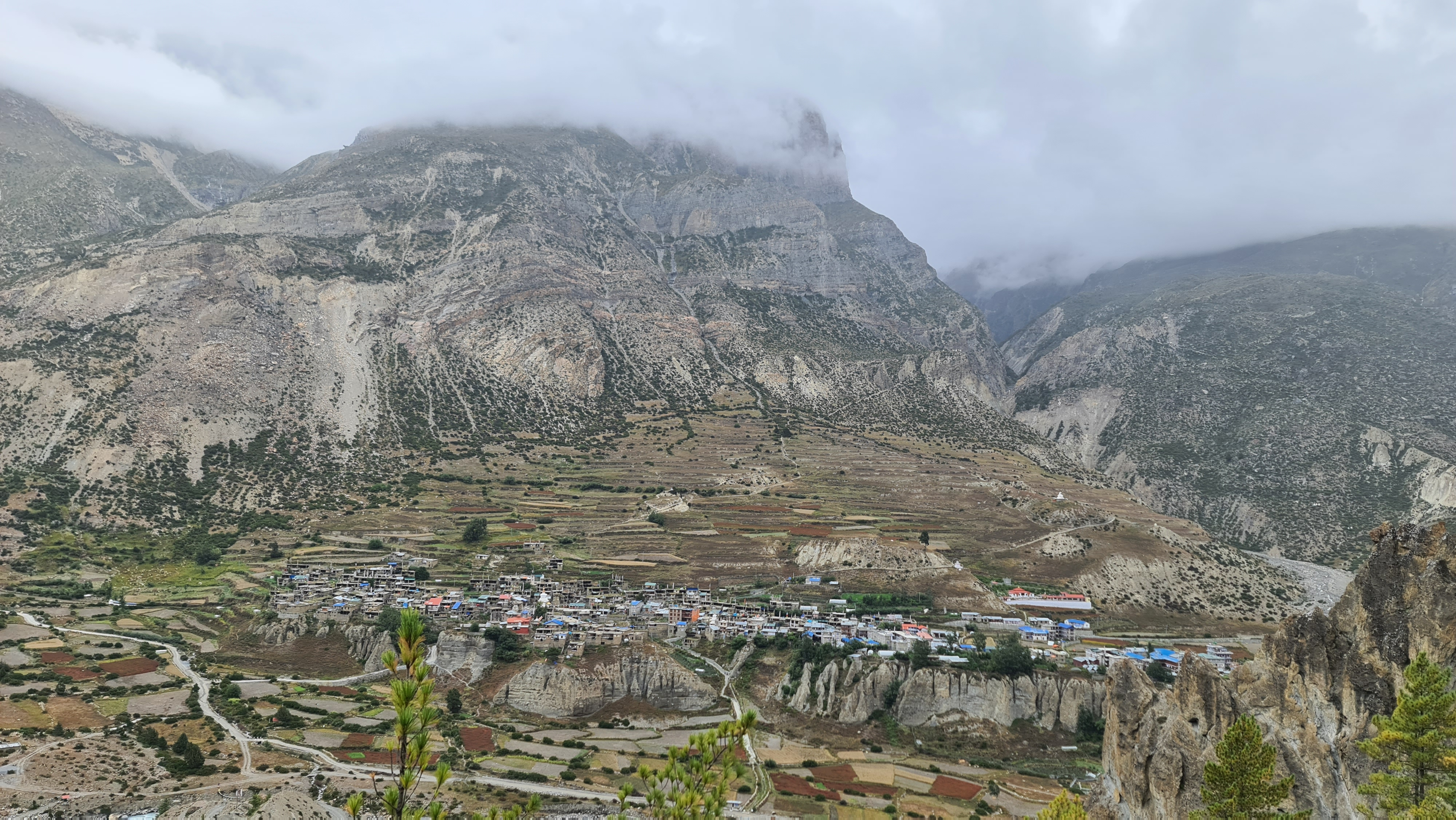
Manang Town, pictured from Chongkor view point

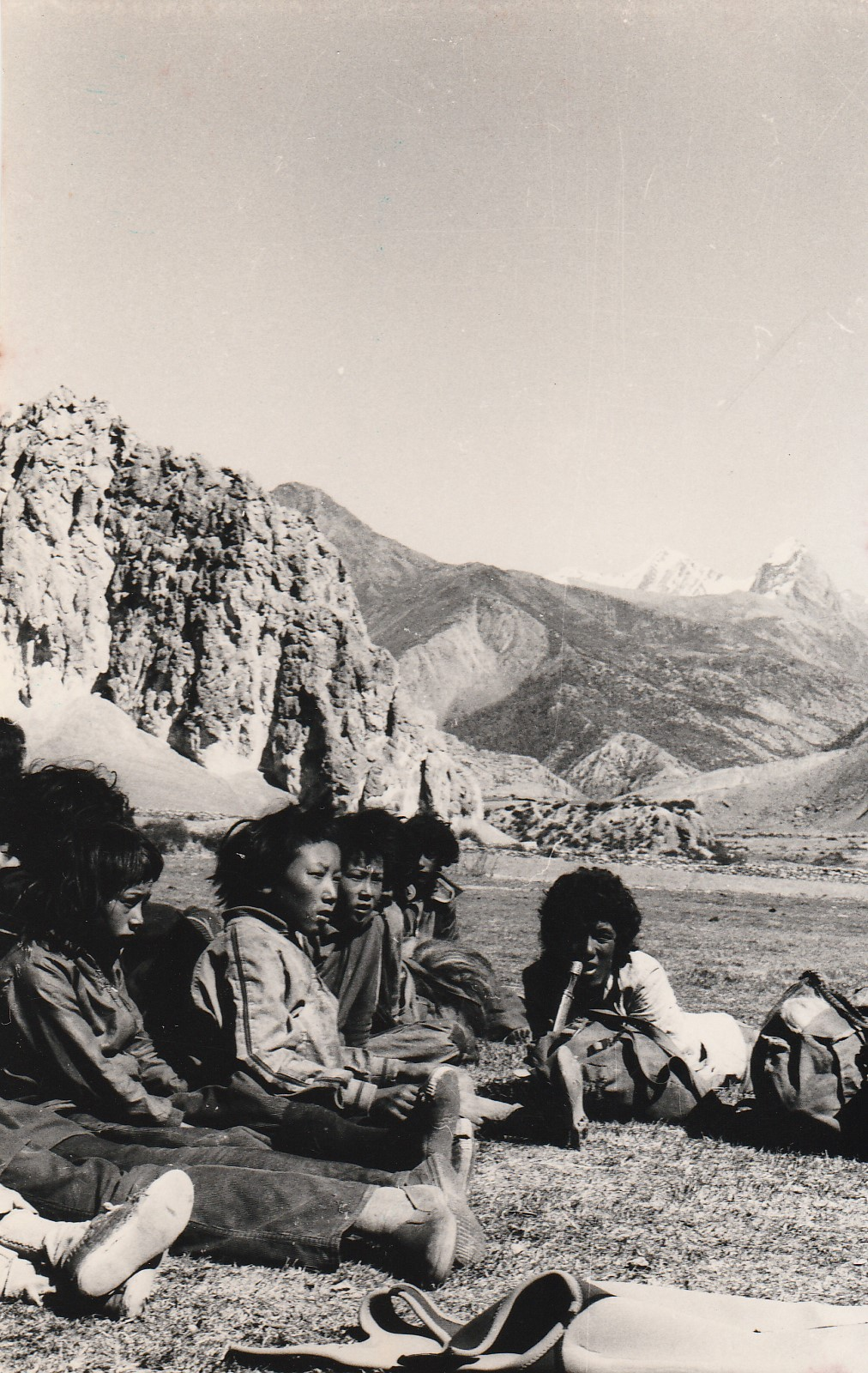
Manang in 1980

== Climate ==
Climate data for Manang (Manang Airport), elevation 3,401 m (11,158 ft), (1991–2020 normals)
Month	Jan	Feb	Mar	Apr	May	Jun	Jul	Aug	Sep	Oct	Nov	Dec	Year
Mean daily maximum °C (°F)	7.0 (44.6)	8.6 (47.5)	11.2 (52.2)	14.3 (57.7)	16.0 (60.8)	18.9 (66.0)	18.8 (65.8)	19.2 (66.6)	17.9 (64.2)	14.6 (58.3)	11.6 (52.9)	9.1 (48.4)	13.9 (57.1)
Daily mean °C (°F)	−1.0 (30.2)	1.0 (33.8)	3.9 (39.0)	6.9 (44.4)	9.4 (48.9)	13.3 (55.9)	14.3 (57.7)	14.5 (58.1)	12.7 (54.9)	7.8 (46.0)	3.6 (38.5)	0.8 (33.4)	7.3 (45.1)
Mean daily minimum °C (°F)	−8.9 (16.0)	−6.7 (19.9)	−3.4 (25.9)	−0.5 (31.1)	2.7 (36.9)	7.6 (45.7)	9.8 (49.6)	9.7 (49.5)	7.5 (45.5)	0.9 (33.6)	−4.4 (24.1)	−7.5 (18.5)	0.6 (33.0)
Average precipitation mm (inches)	6.0 (0.24)	15.1 (0.59)	21.6 (0.85)	38.5 (1.52)	40.4 (1.59)	54.7 (2.15)	85.0 (3.35)	67.0 (2.64)	59.7 (2.35)	38.9 (1.53)	1.1 (0.04)	3.8 (0.15)	431.8 (17)
Source: Department of Hydrology and Meteorology

== See also ==
- Manang Language
- Thonje
- Milarepa Cave, Gandaki
