= Thorong La =

Mountain pass in Nepal

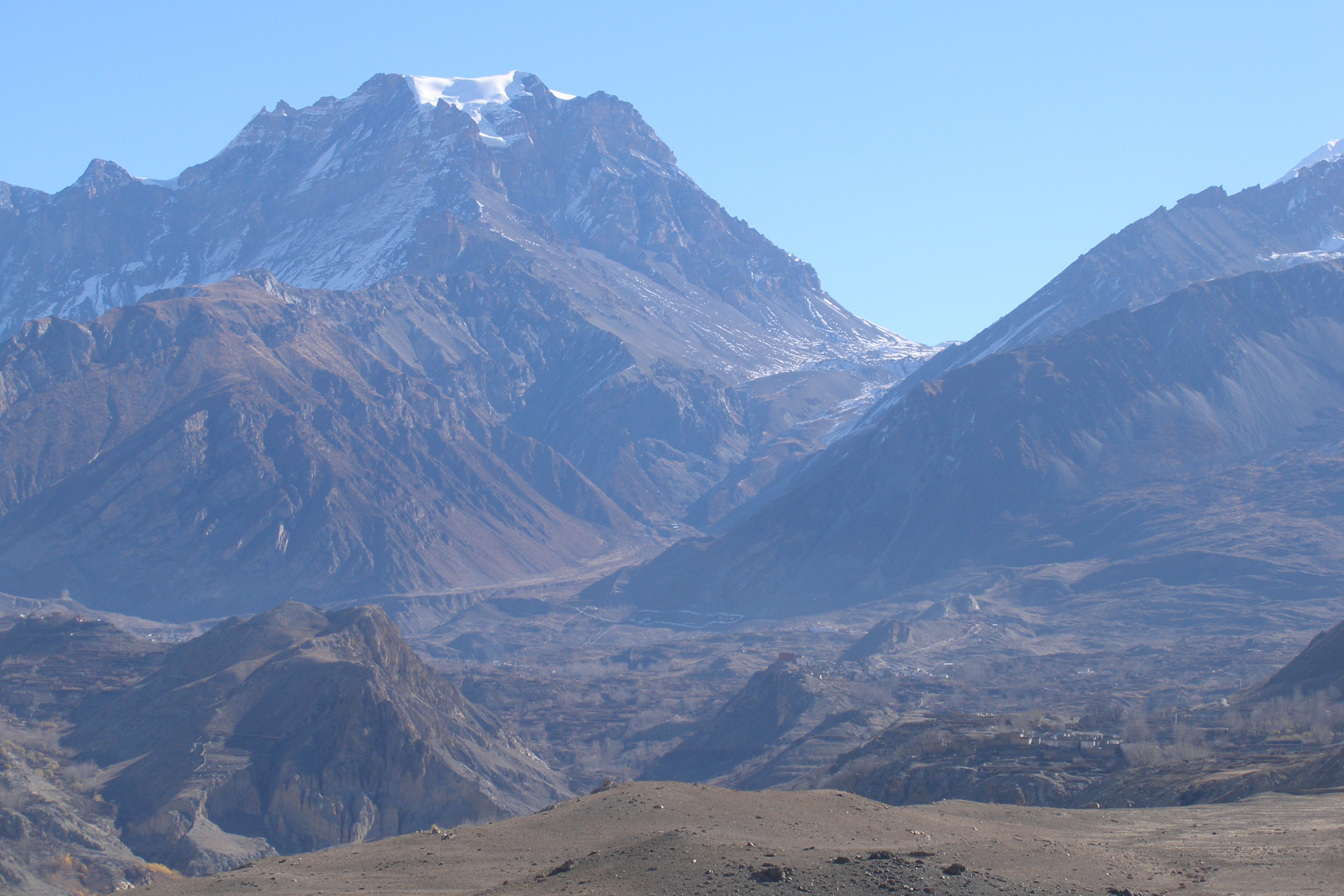
- Mustang side of Thorong La in Damodar Himal
- Interactive map of Thorong La
- Elevation: 5,416 metres (17,769 ft)

Third Approach
- Location: Nepal
- Range: Himalayas
- Coordinates: 28°47′36″N 83°56′20″E

Thorong La or Thorung La is a mountain pass with an elevation of 5,416 metres (17,769 ft) above sea level in the Damodar Himal, north of the Annapurna Himal, in central Nepal. Thorong Ri is on the slope of Khatung Kang and Yakawa Kang are the mountains forming Thorong La. The pass is located on a trail that connects the village of Manang in the Manang District to the east, with the temple of Muktinath and the nearby village of Ranipauwa, in the Mustang District to the west. Thorong La is the highest point on the Annapurna Circuit, a 300 km (190 mi) route around the Annapurna mountain range. In addition to trekkers, the pass is regularly used by local traders.

== Mountaineering ==
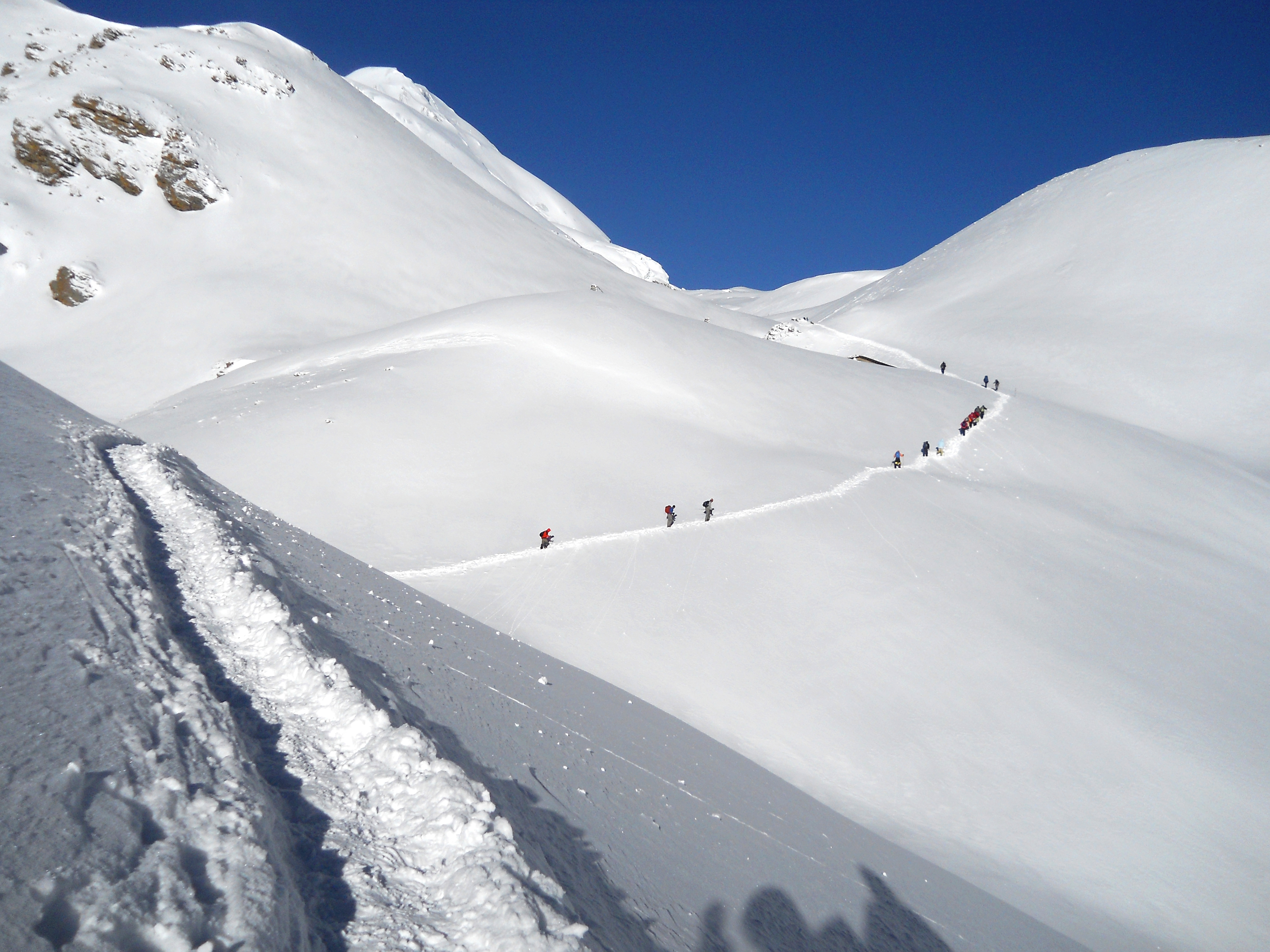
Trekking route east of Thorong La

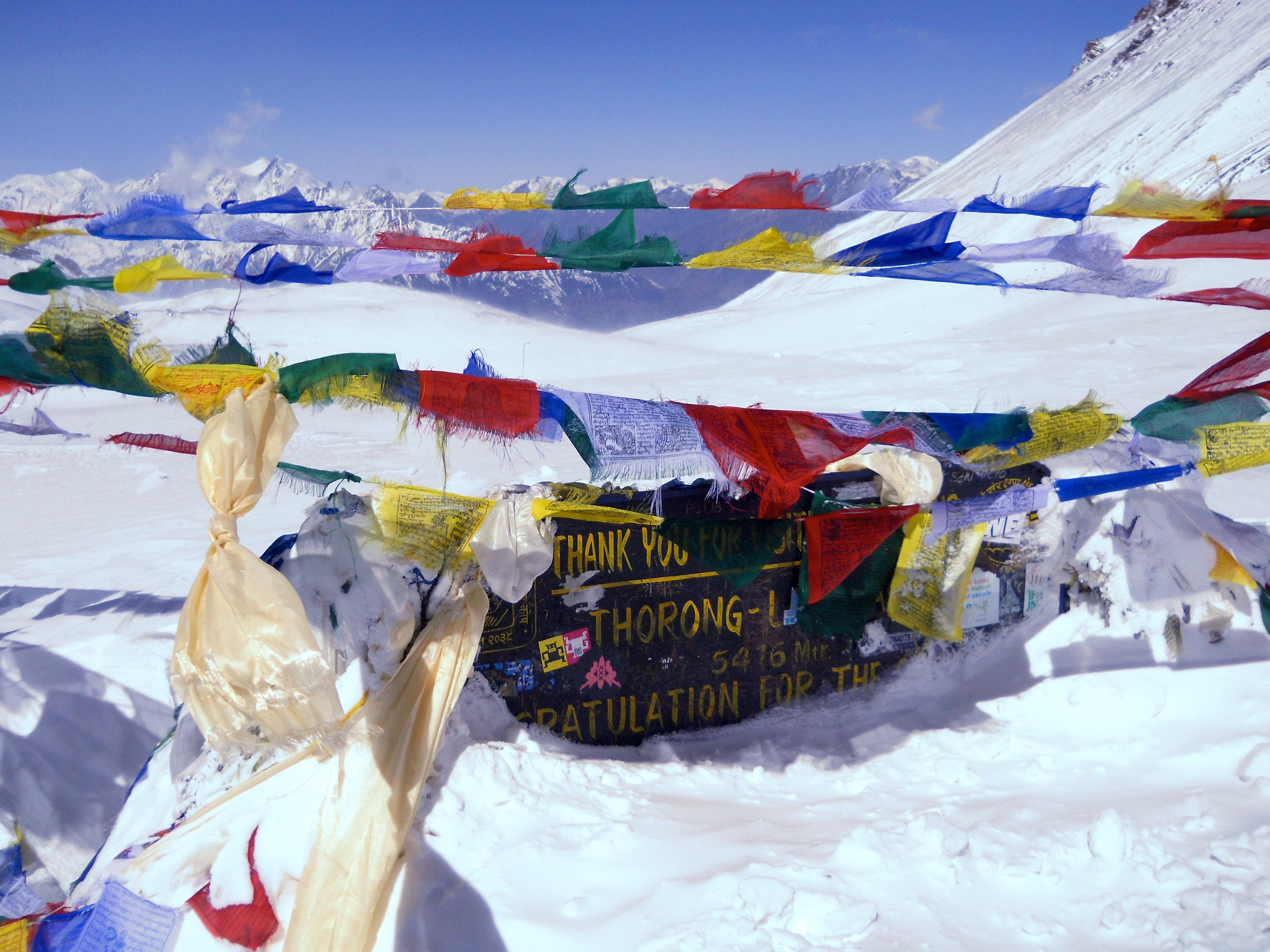
Thorong La (Pass)

Most trekkers cross the pass from east to west (Manang to Muktinath), which is the easiest and safest direction. It is not possible to cross Thorong La from Manang to Muktinath in one day. Trekkers usually spend the first night in Yak Kharka and the second night in Thorong Phedi — which is situated at 4,540 metres (14,895 ft), or at Thorong High Camp — which is situated at 4,880 metres (16,010 ft) before attempting to go over Thorong La. Choosing this option decreases the elevation gain and loss for that day's hike, as well as decreasing the distance. The staff of the Himalayan Rescue Association post in Manang recommends that trekkers spend five nights between their arrival in Manang and the crossing to Muktinath. The additional time spent in Manang allows trekkers to acclimatize sufficiently to minimize the risk of acute mountain sickness (AMS). The Himalayan Rescue Association operates a medical clinic at Manang, and periodically a small outpost at Thorong Phedi.

The route from west to east (Muktinath to Manang) is much more difficult, because it does not allow most trekkers sufficient time for acclimatization to the altitude. For trekkers choosing this direction of travel, the last place where it is possible to spend the night is located at Ranipauwa, where there is a lodge situated at 3,670 metres (12,041 ft). There is also a very basic lodge located at Muktinath Phedi, situated at 4,190 metres (13,747 ft), but this lodge is only open seasonally. Trekkers going from west to east must therefore ascend at least 1,230 metres (4,035 ft) and descend at least 540 metres (1,772 ft) in one day.

The safest months to cross the pass are March–May and September–November. Attempting to cross Thorong La at other times of the year is dangerous due to the increased risk of avalanches, frostbite and the likelihood of a storm or a whiteout, which can cause trekkers to become disoriented and lost. Trekkers usually depart Thorung Pedi / Thorung High camp a few hours before sunrise, as strong winds typically begin a few hours after sunrise.

== Local climate ==
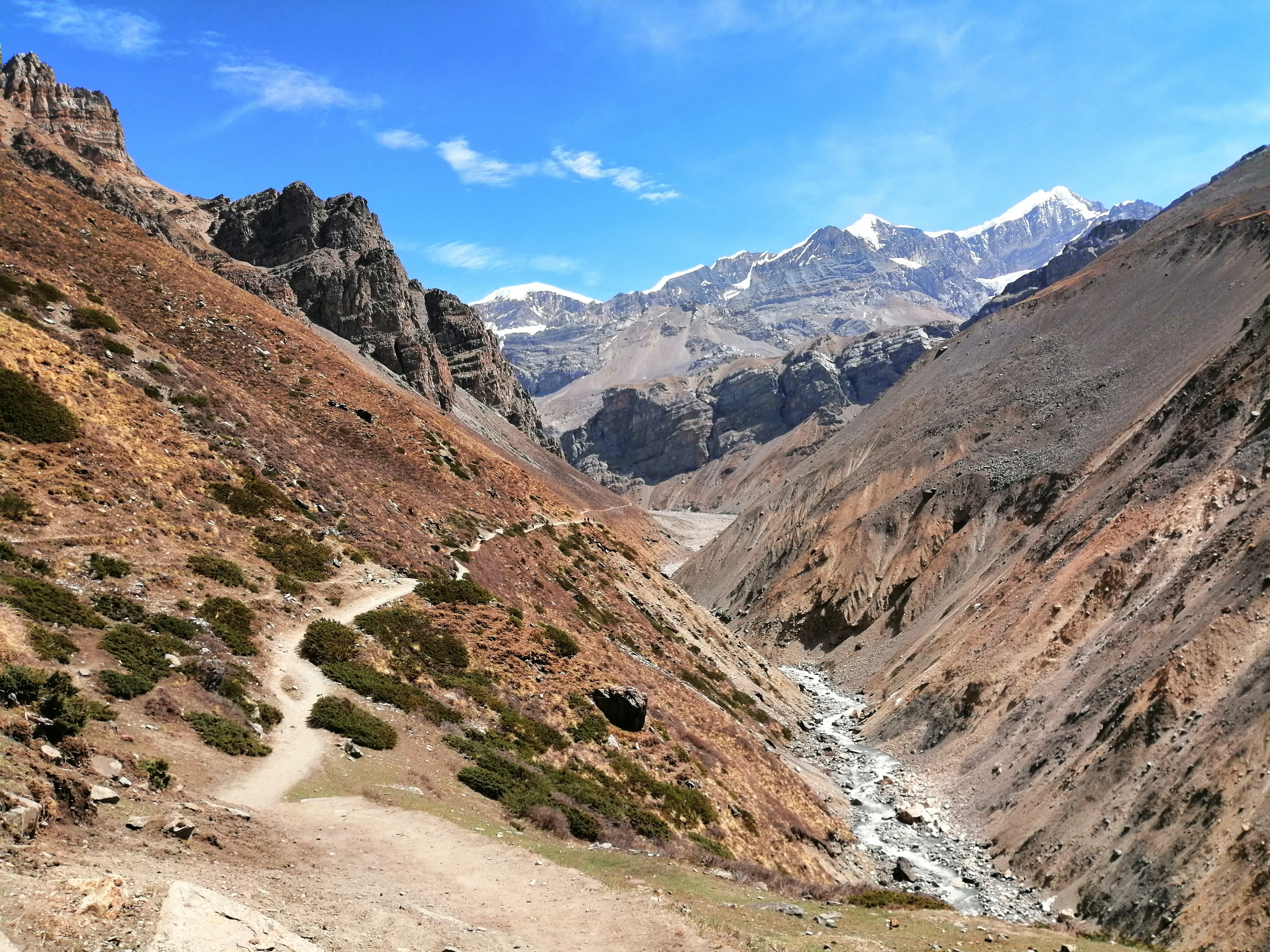
Trail in Manang district leading to Thorong Phedi

The local climate on the western side of the pass is much drier than on the eastern side. There is practically no vegetation on the western side, except where irrigated, while in the Manang valley, there is much more vegetation and cultivation is possible, while it is still fairly dry, as the valley is protected from the wet southern monsoon winds by the Annapurna mountain range. From December to February, Thorong la Pass is filled with snowfall of 1 to 3 inches and the temperature remains between negative 3 to 7 degrees Celsius.

== 2014 disaster ==
After a heavy blizzard from Cyclone Hudhud about forty people, including trekkers, guides and locals, were killed around Thorong La. Hampered by 1.8 meters of snow within twelve hours and disruption of cell service in the Manang District, local forces were able to rescue ca. 300 people by helicopter.

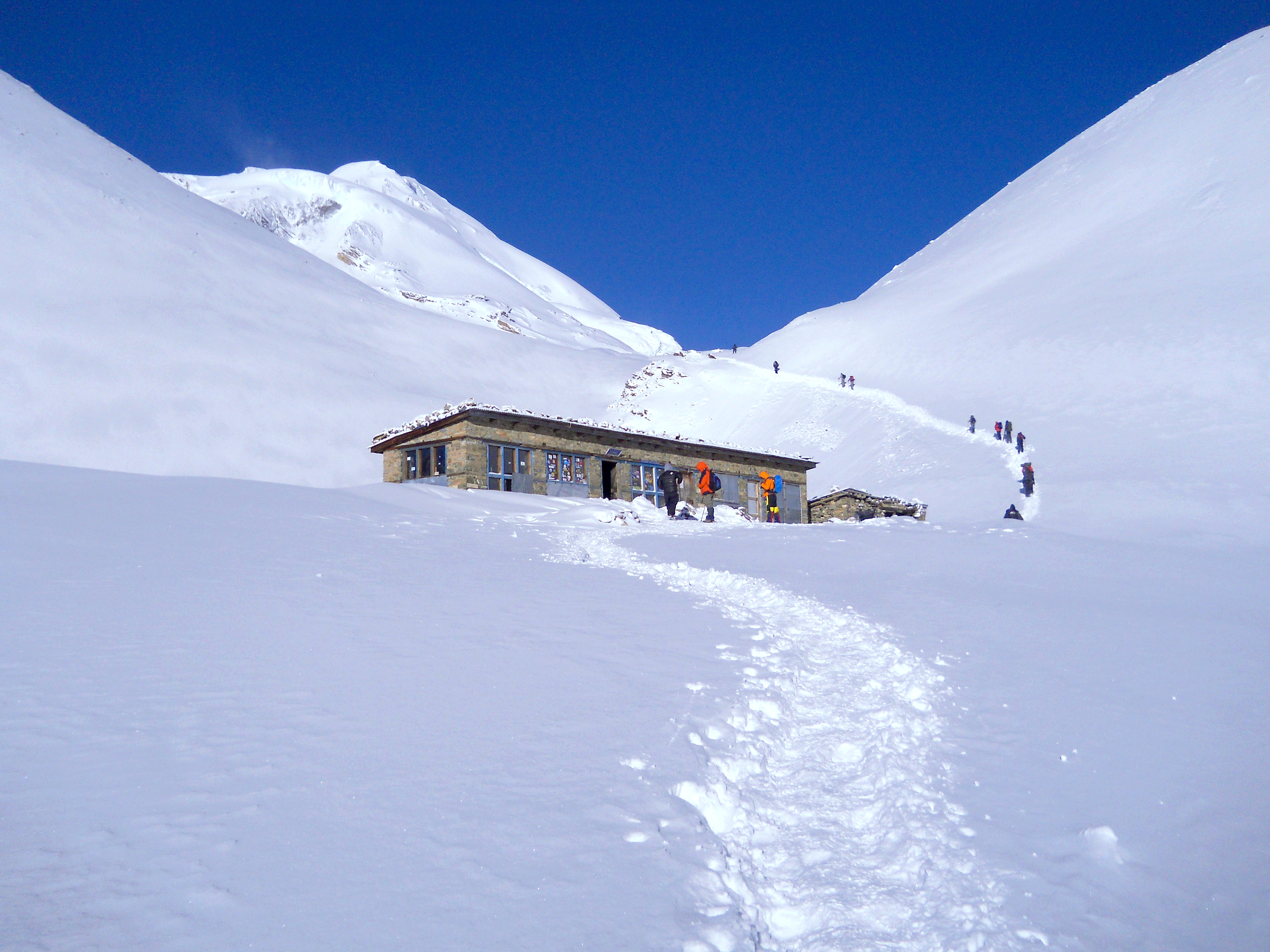
Last tea house east of Thorong La

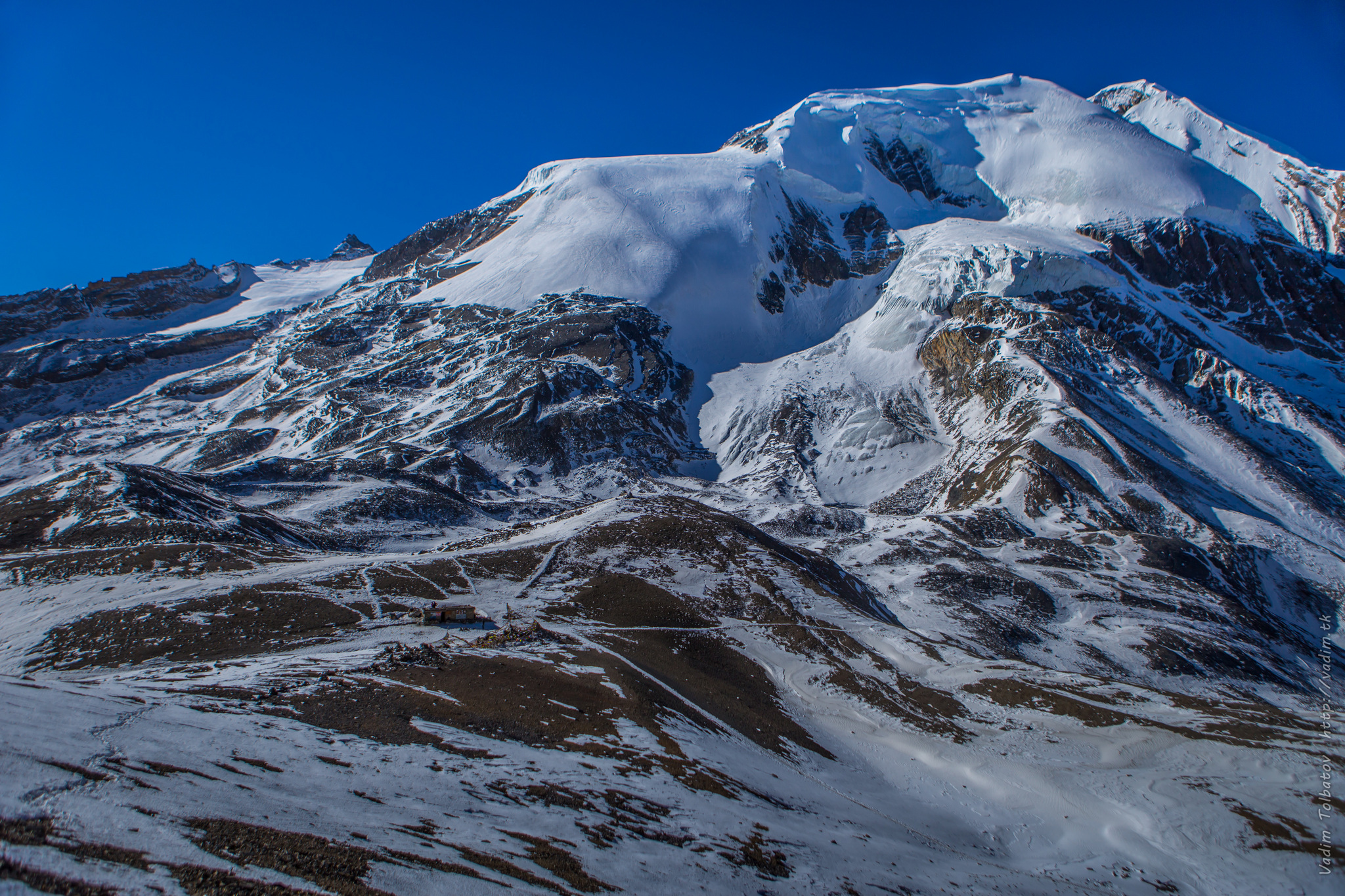
General view over Thorong La from Yakawa Kang sidehill, on the horizon Thorong Ri in the foreground and Khatung Kang right

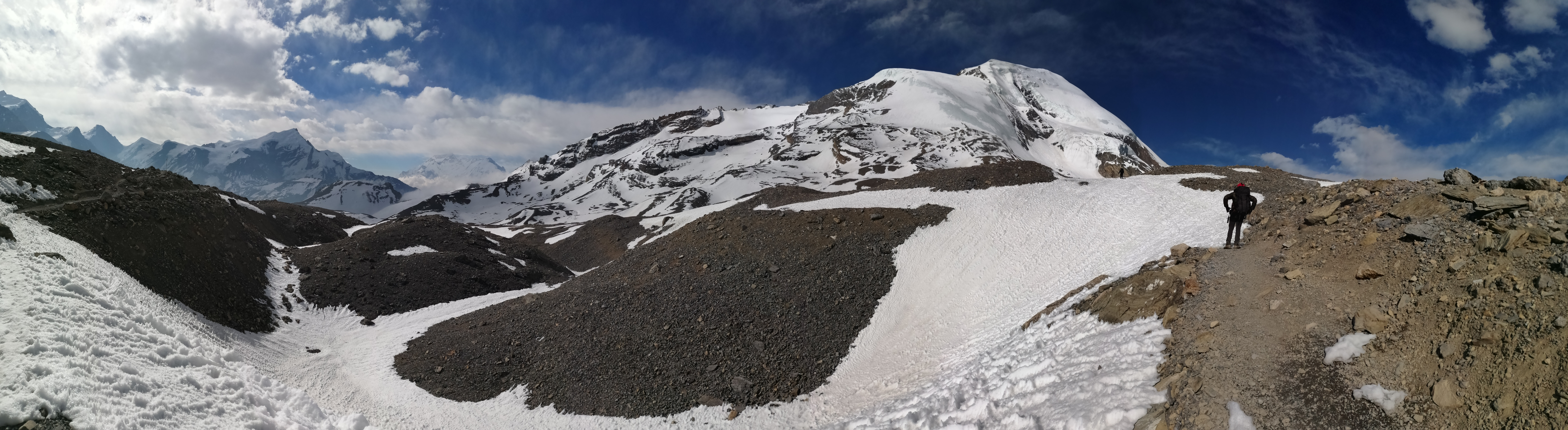
Panorama of Chulu West, Annapurna range in the distance, Thorong Ri

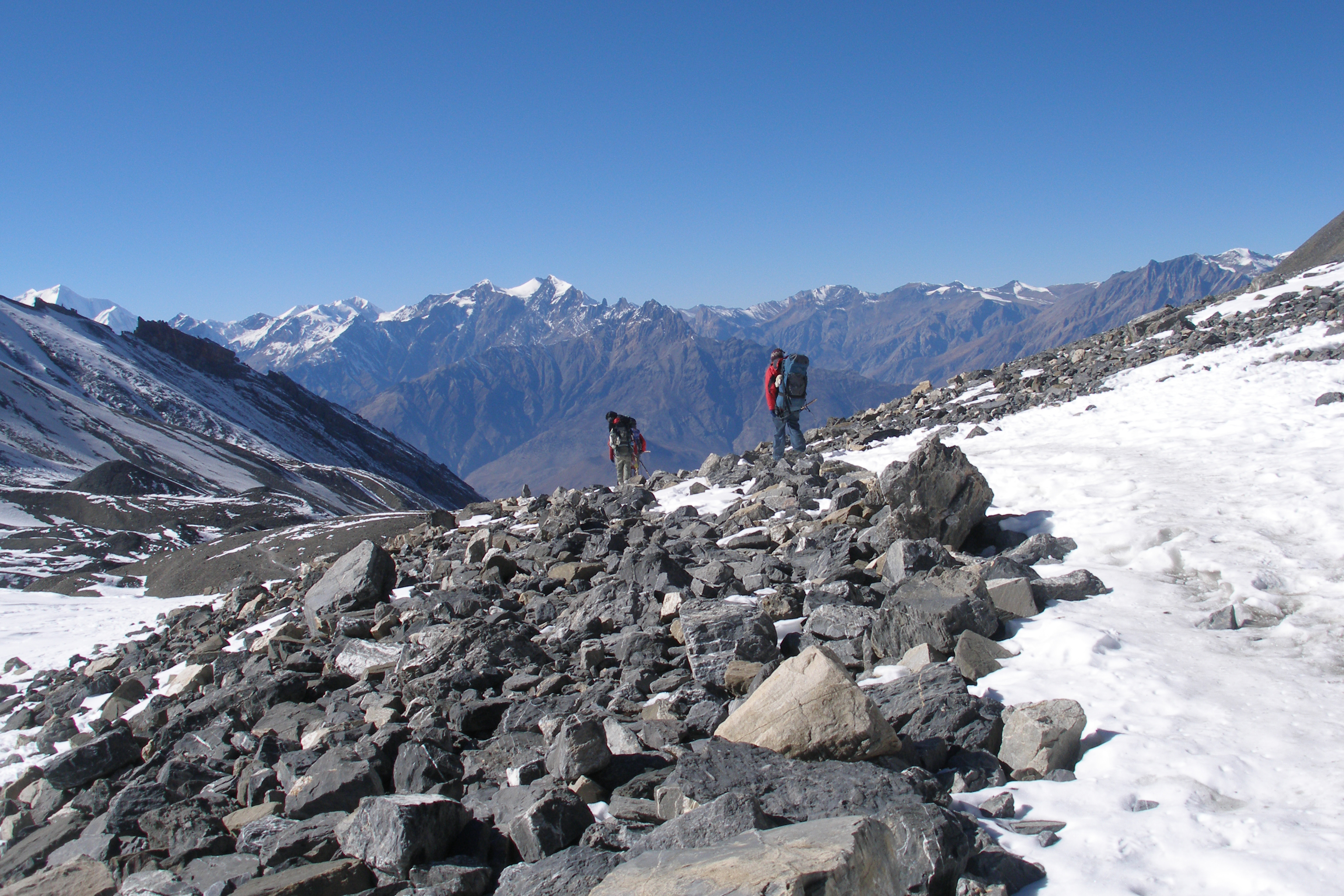
Facing West, Dhaulagiri range distant on the far left

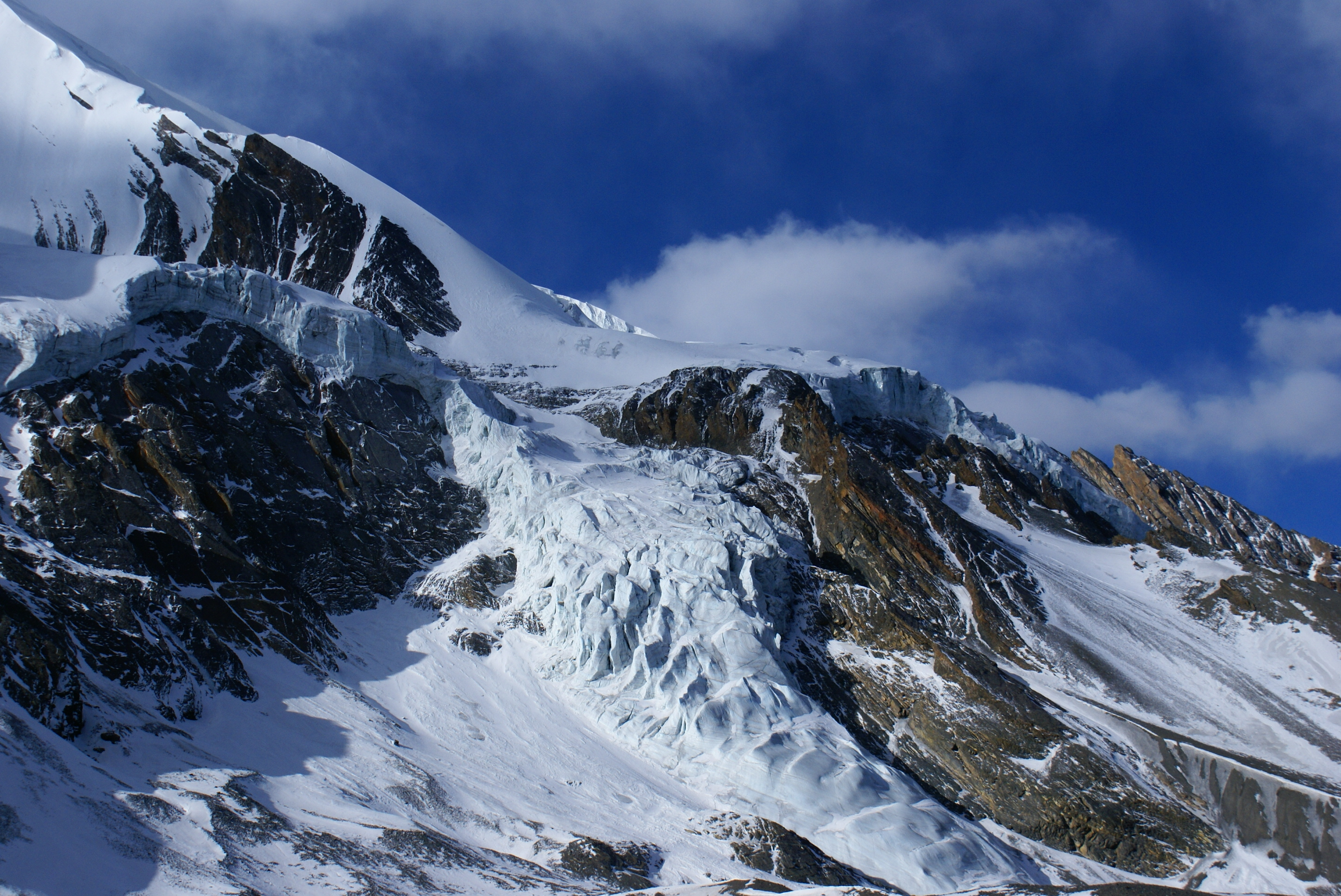
Western slopes of Khatung Kang
