= Yakawa Kang =

Mountain in Nepal

- Yākwākāṅ
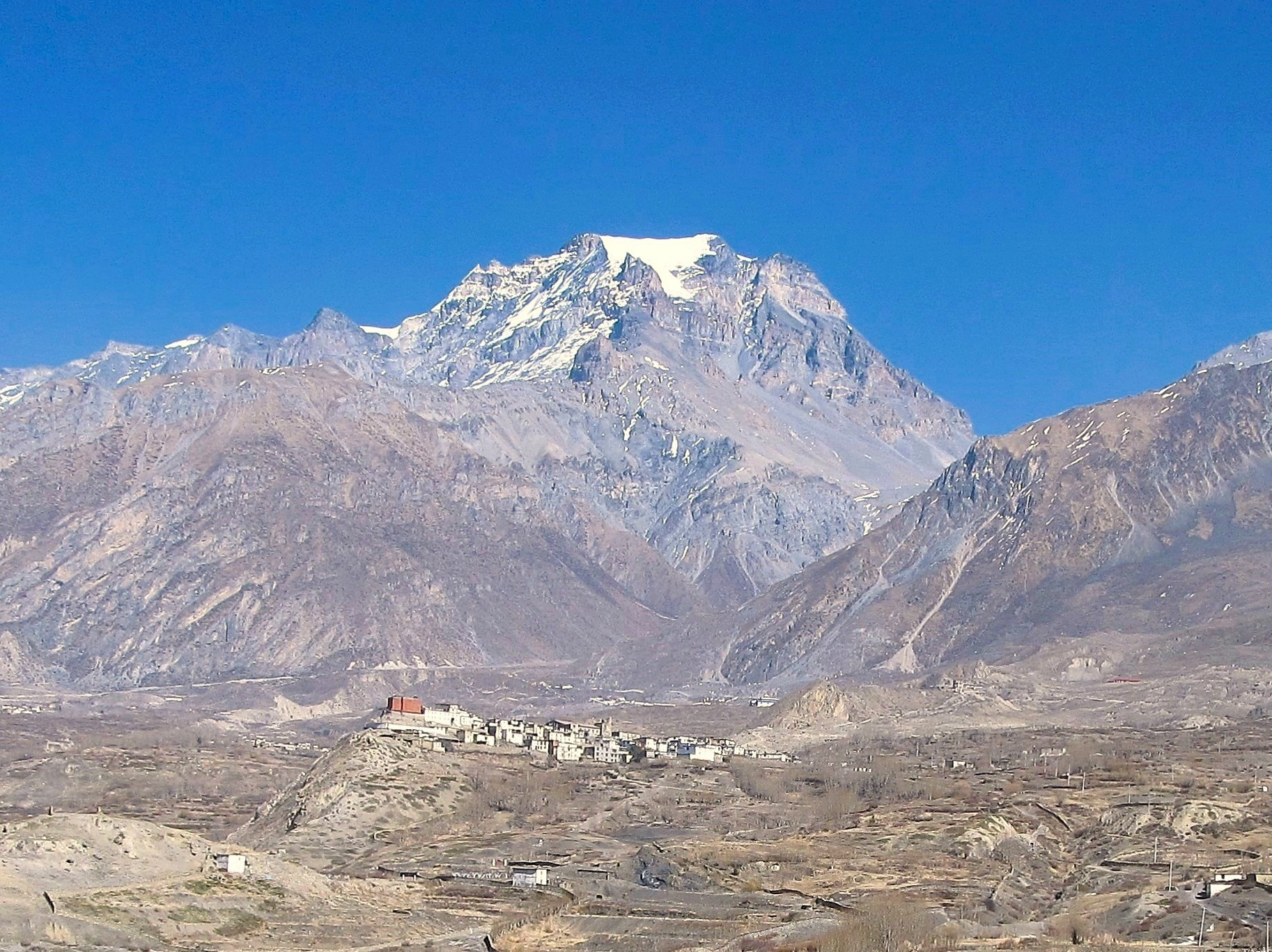
- West aspect

Highest point
- Elevation: 6,482 m (21,266 ft)
- Prominence: 690 m (2,264 ft)
- Parent peak: Purbung
- Isolation: 4.12 km (2.56 mi)
- Coordinates: 28°48′31″N 83°56′40″E

Geography
- Location within Nepal
- Interactive map of Yakawa Kang
- Country: Nepal
- Province: Gandaki
- District: Mustang / Manang
- Protected area: Annapurna Conservation Area
- Parent range: Himalayas; Damodar Himalaya

Climbing
- First ascent: 2010

Yakawa Kang, also known as Yākwākāṅ, is a mountain in Nepal.

== Description ==
Yakawa Kang is a 6,482-metre (21,266-foot) glaciated summit in the Nepalese Himalayas. It is situated eight kilometres (5.0 mi) east of Ranipauwa in Gandaki Province. Precipitation runoff from the mountain's slopes drains east into tributaries of the Marshyangdi River and west to the Kali Gandaki. Topographic relief is significant as the summit rises 1,066 metres (3,497 ft) above Thorong La in less than two kilometres (1.2 mi) and the northwest face rises 1,300 metres (4,265 ft) in one kilometre (0.62 mi). The Annapurna Circuit traverses below the south slope of this peak. The first ascent of the summit was made on November 7, 2010, by Hidenobu Tsuji, Dawa Norbu Sherpa, Dawa Tshering Sherpa, and Tshering Tashi Sherpa.

== Climate ==
Based on the Köppen climate classification, Yakawa Kang is located in a tundra climate zone with cold, snowy winters, and cool summers. Weather systems are forced upwards by the Himalaya mountains (orographic lift), causing heavy precipitation in the form of rainfall and snowfall. Mid-June through early-August is the monsoon season. The months of April, May, September, and October offer the most favorable weather for viewing or climbing this peak.

== Gallery ==
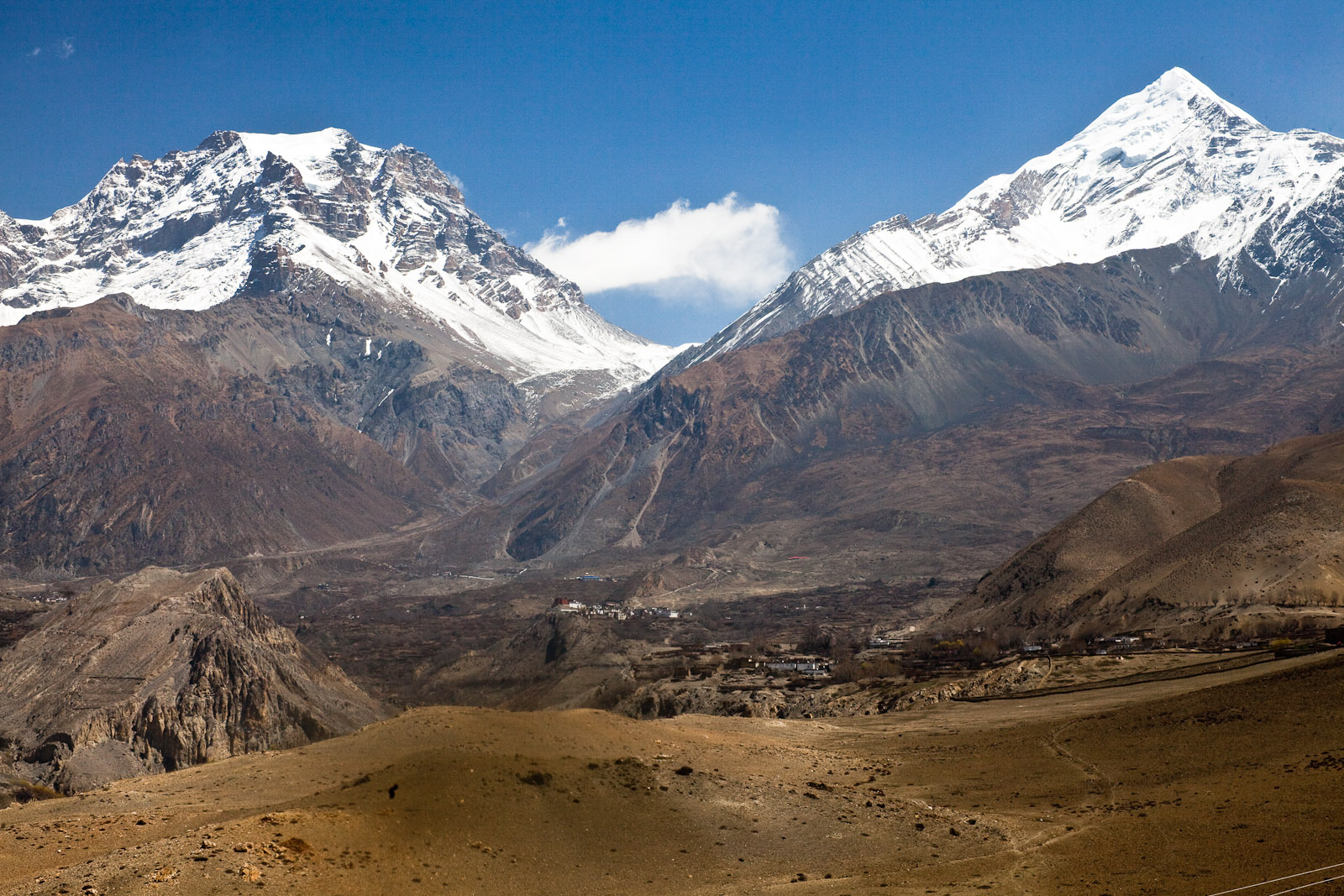
Yakawa Kang (left) and Khatung Kang (right)

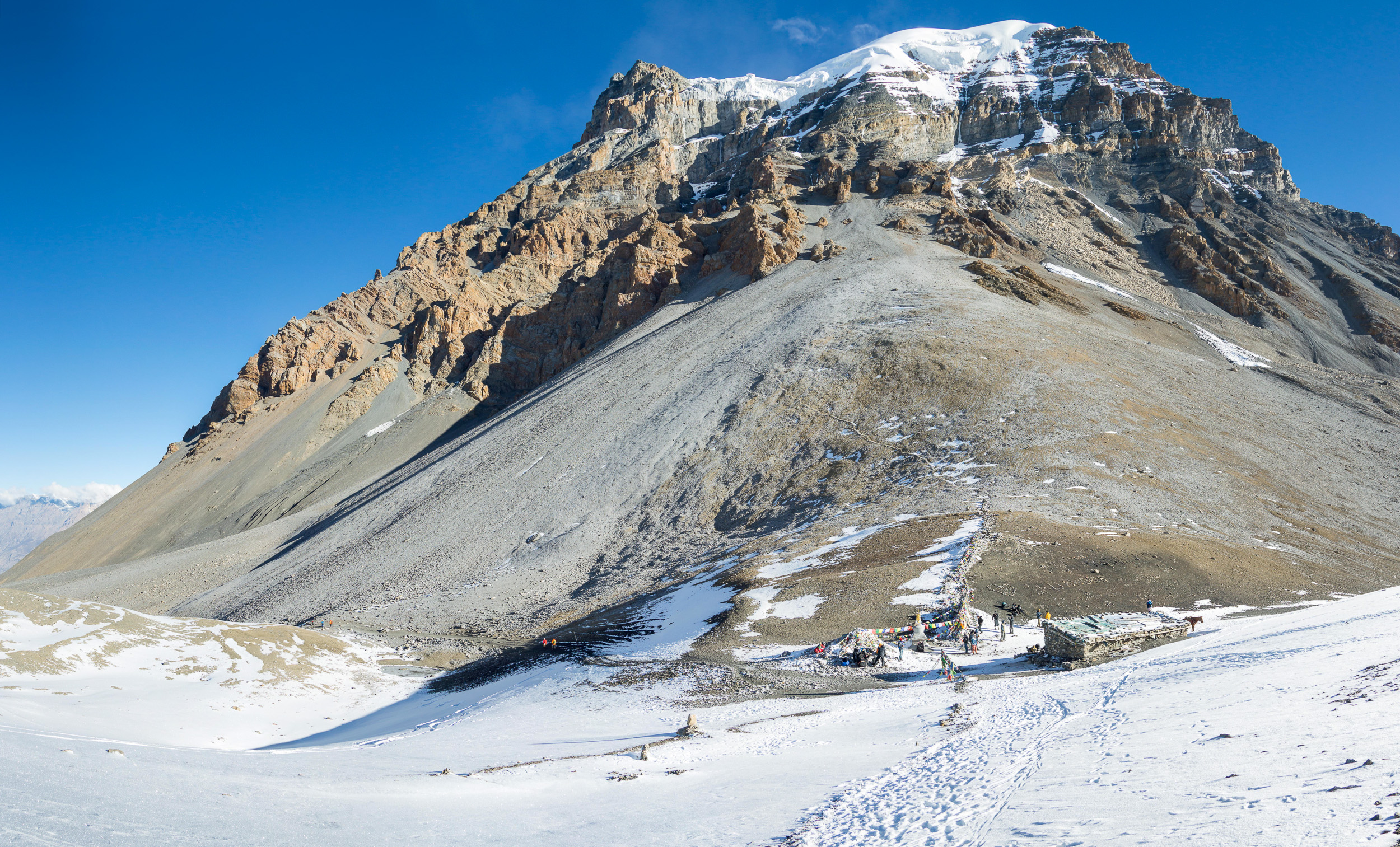
South aspect rises above Thorong La pass

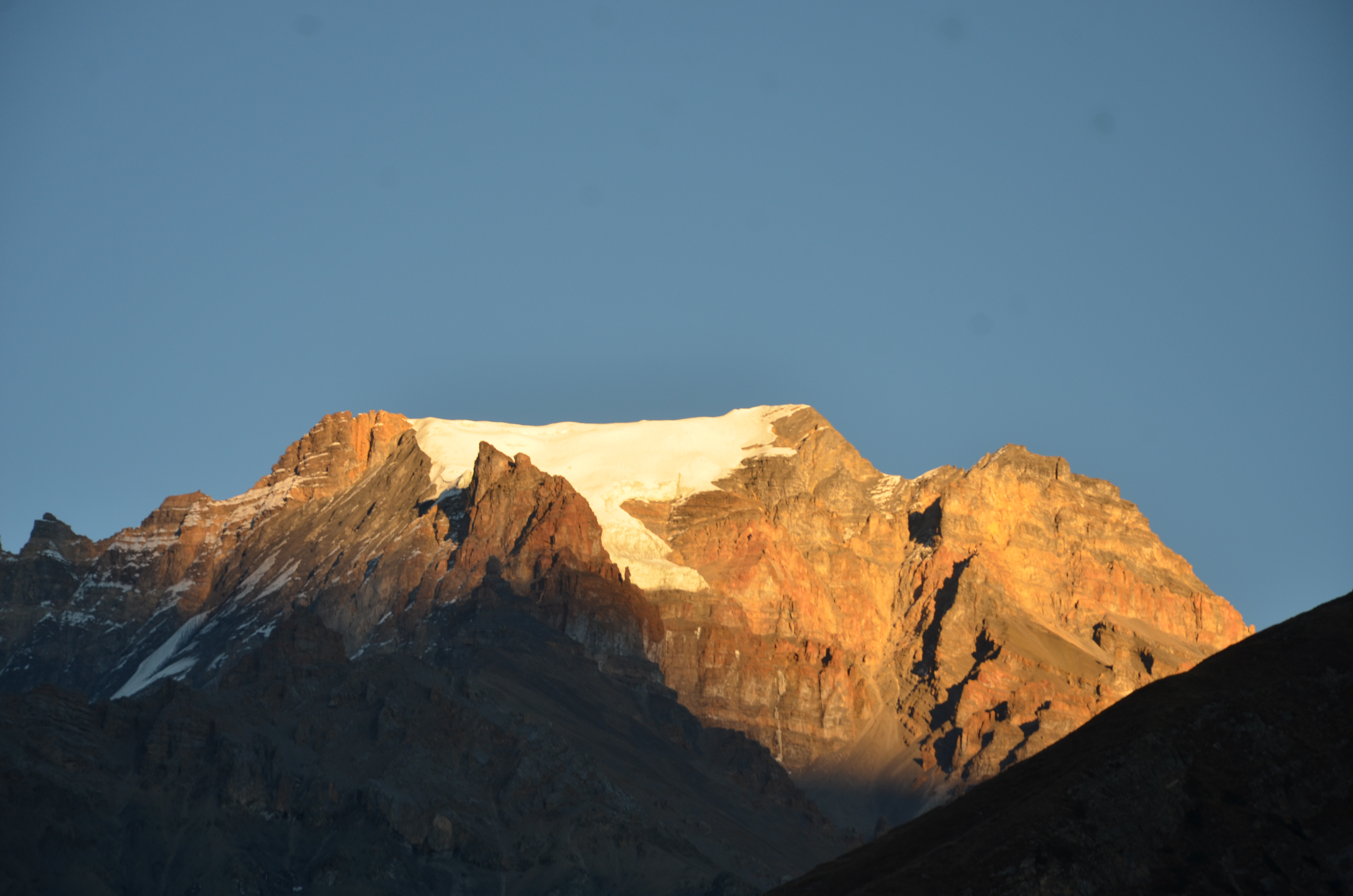
West aspect

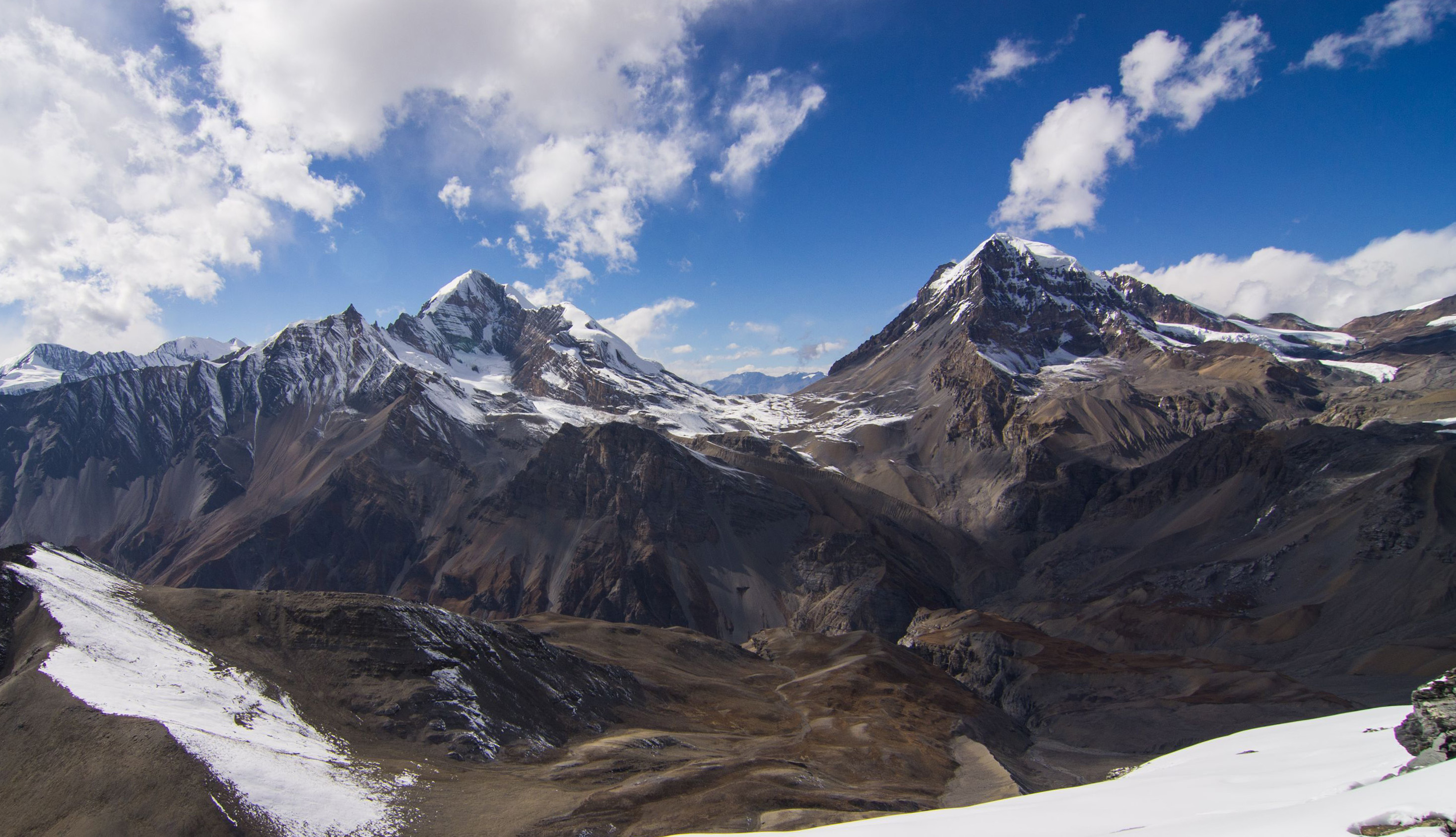
Yakawa Kang (right) and Khatung Kang (left) from east

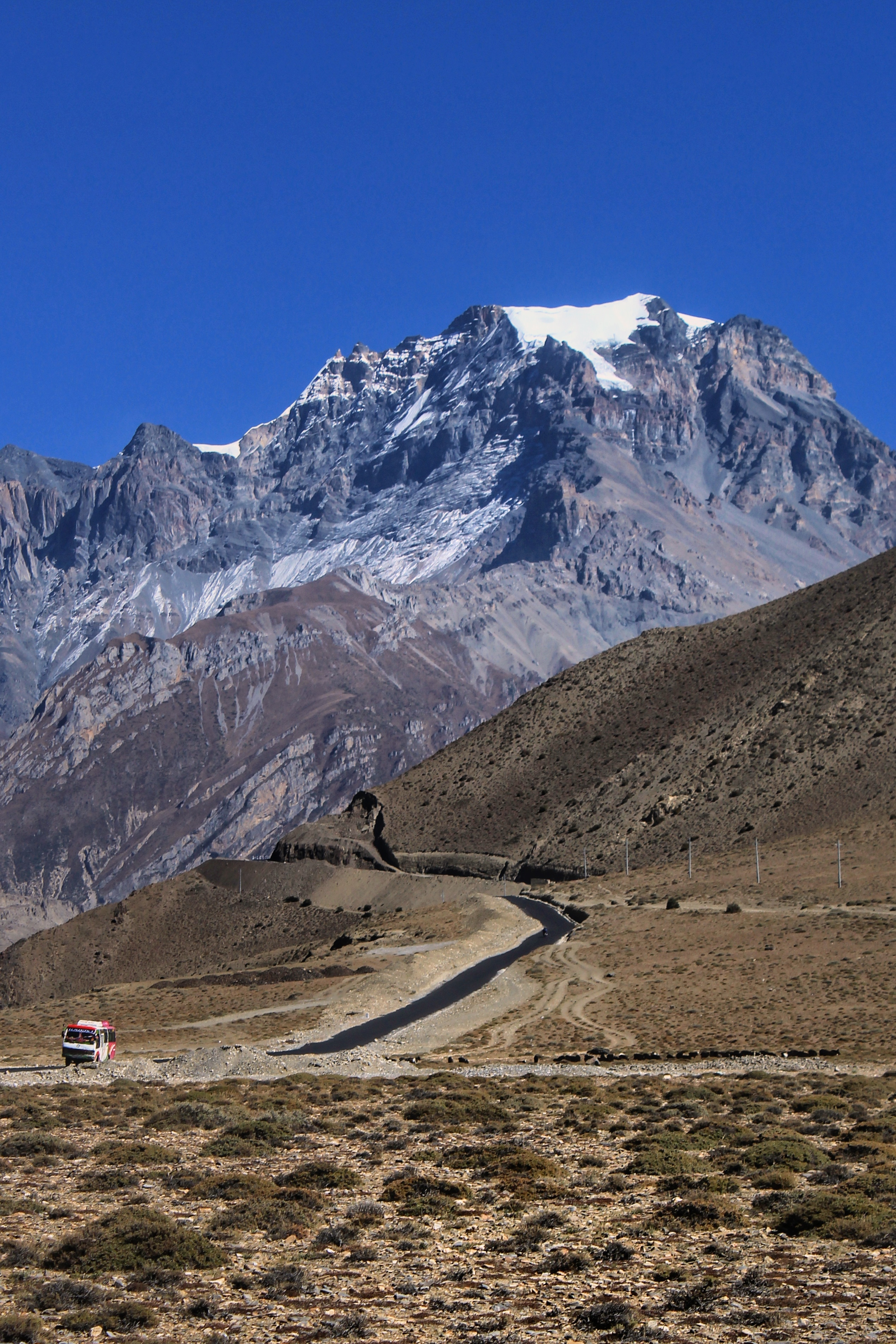
West aspect

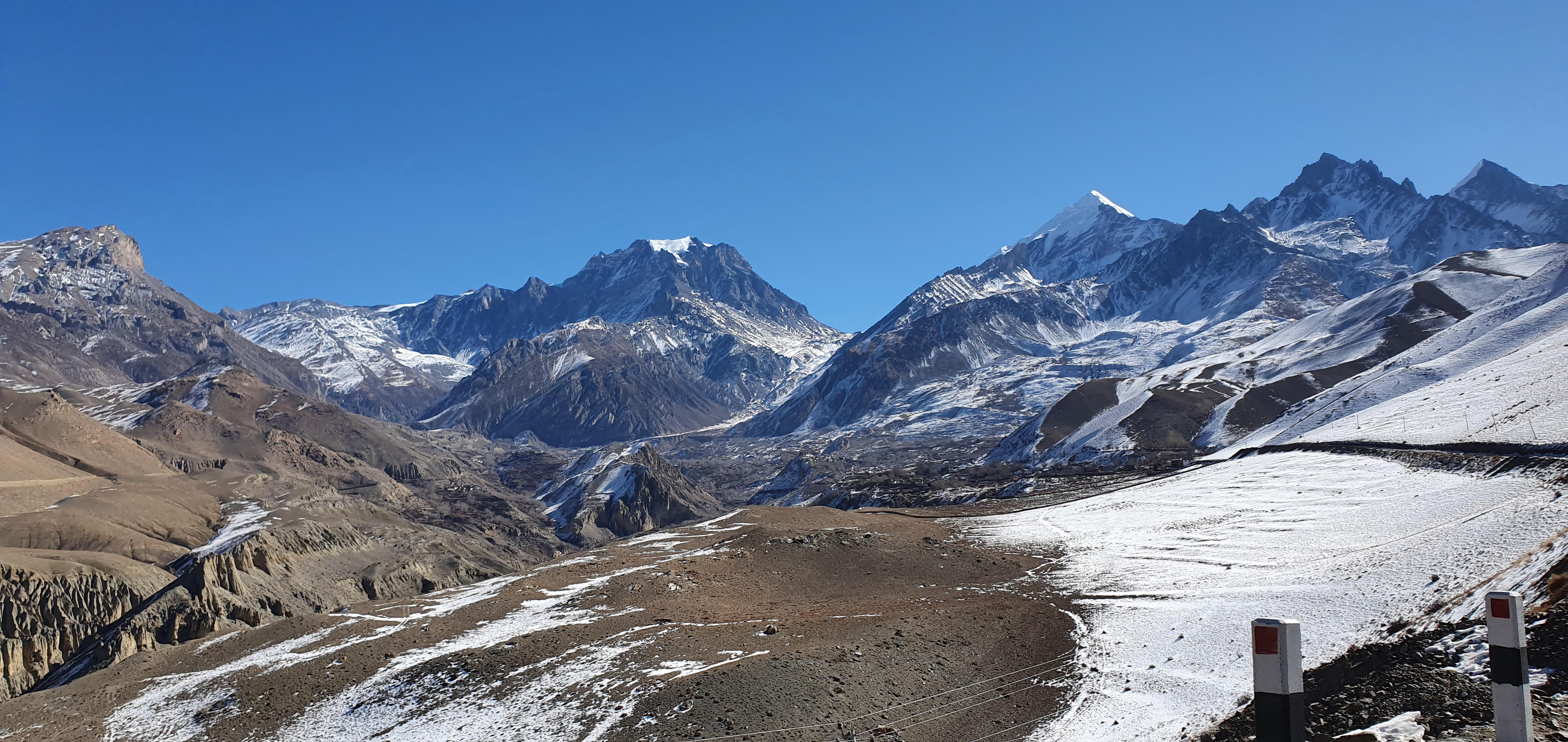
Yakawa Kang left of center

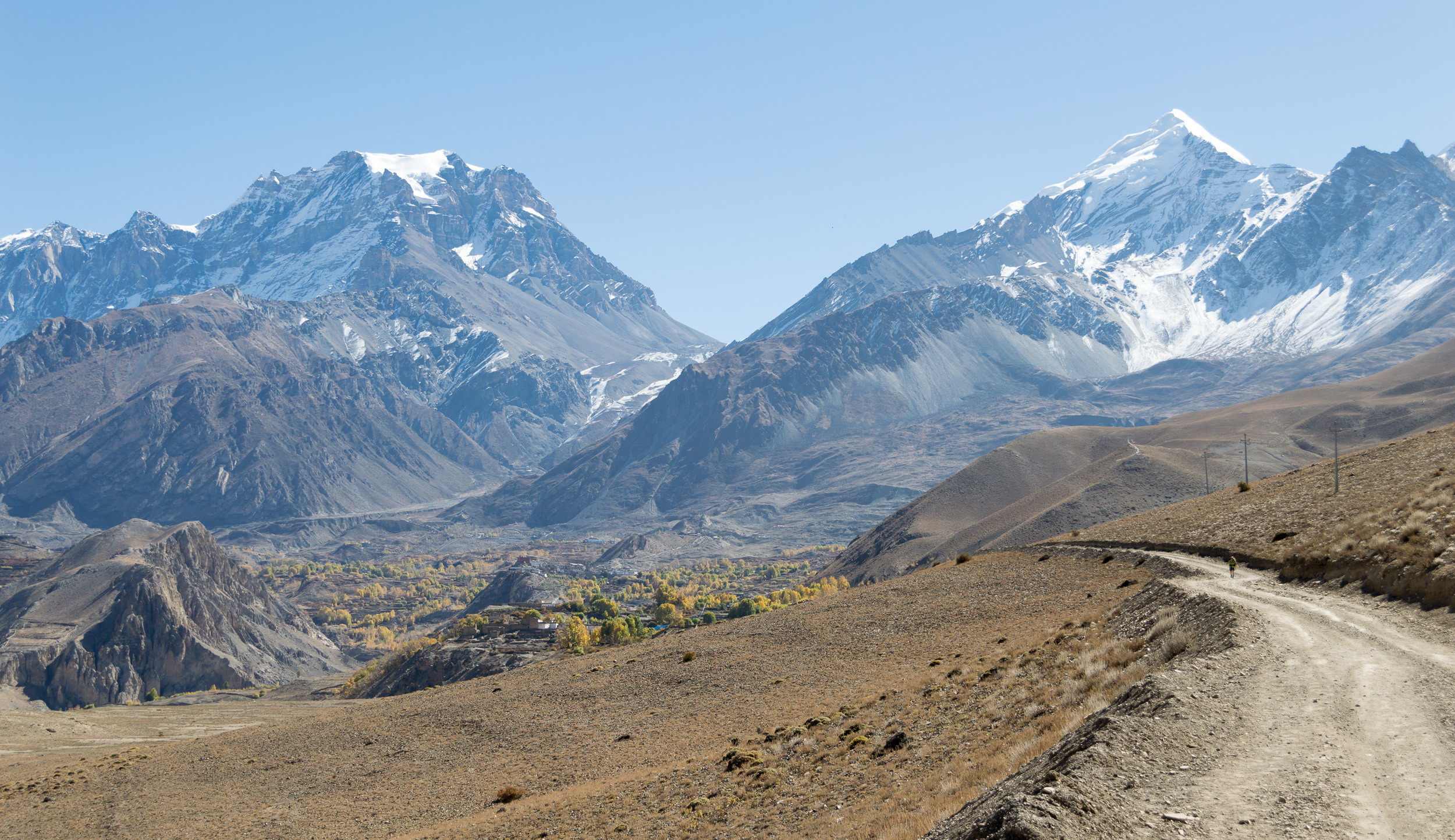
Yakawa Kang (left) and Khatung Kang (right)

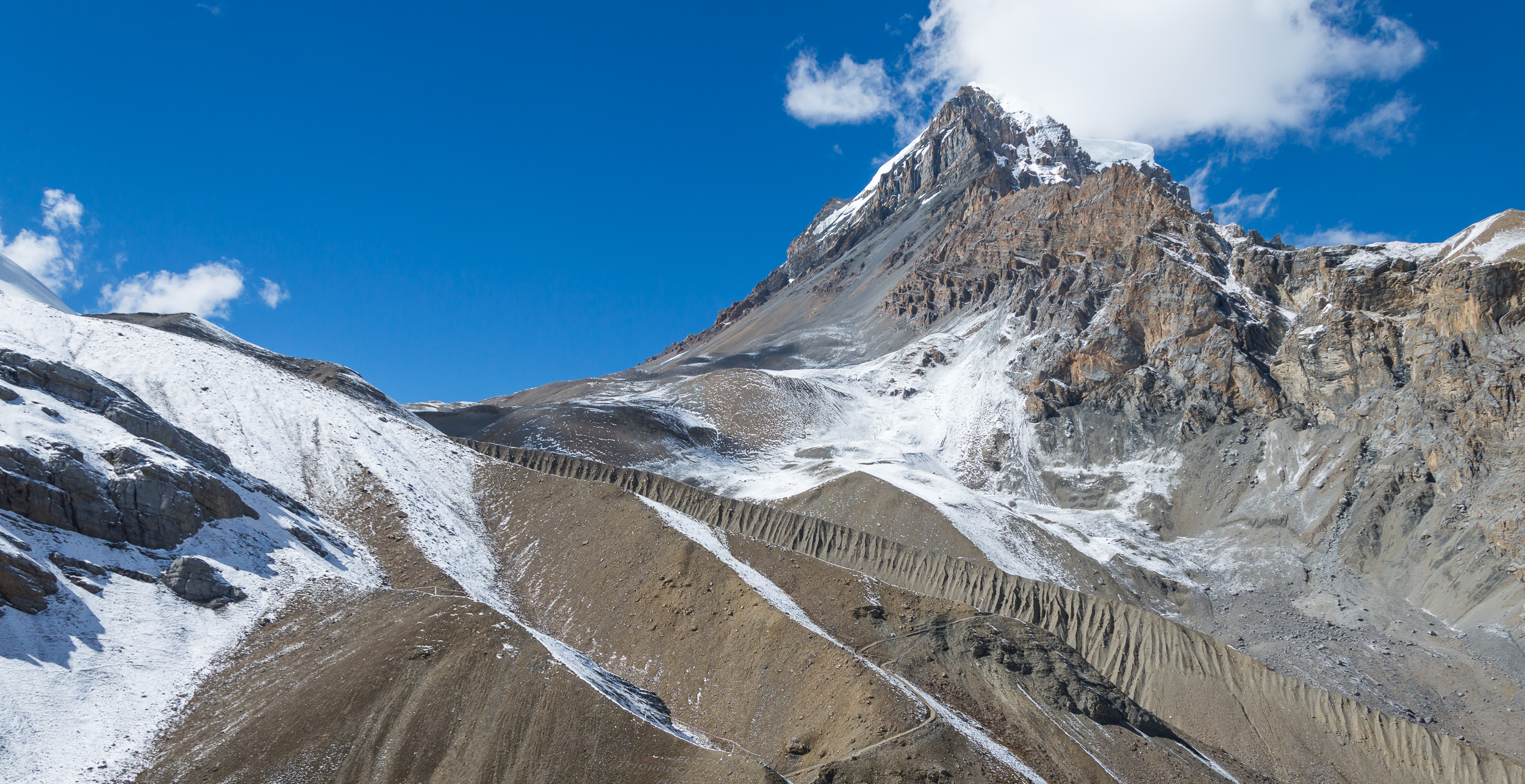
Southeast aspect

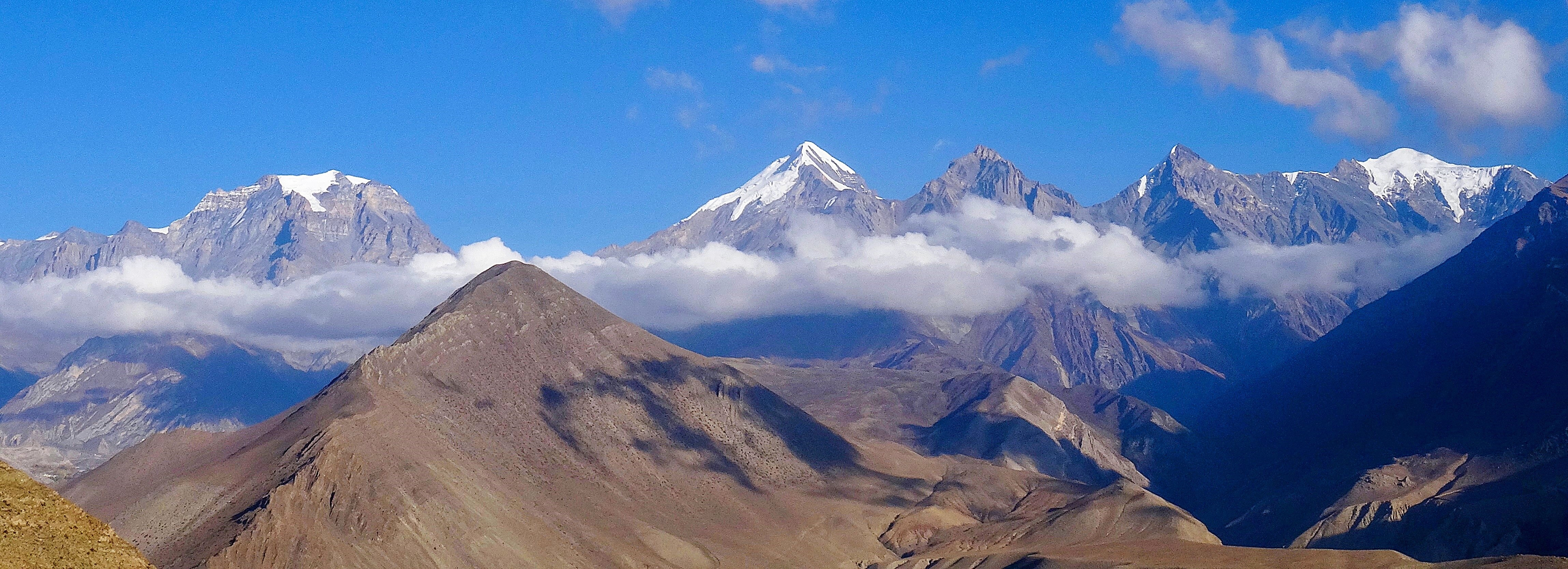
Yakawa Kang left, Khatung Kang centered

== See also ==
- Geology of the Himalayas
