= Khatung Kang =

Mountain in Nepal

- Khātuṅkāṅ
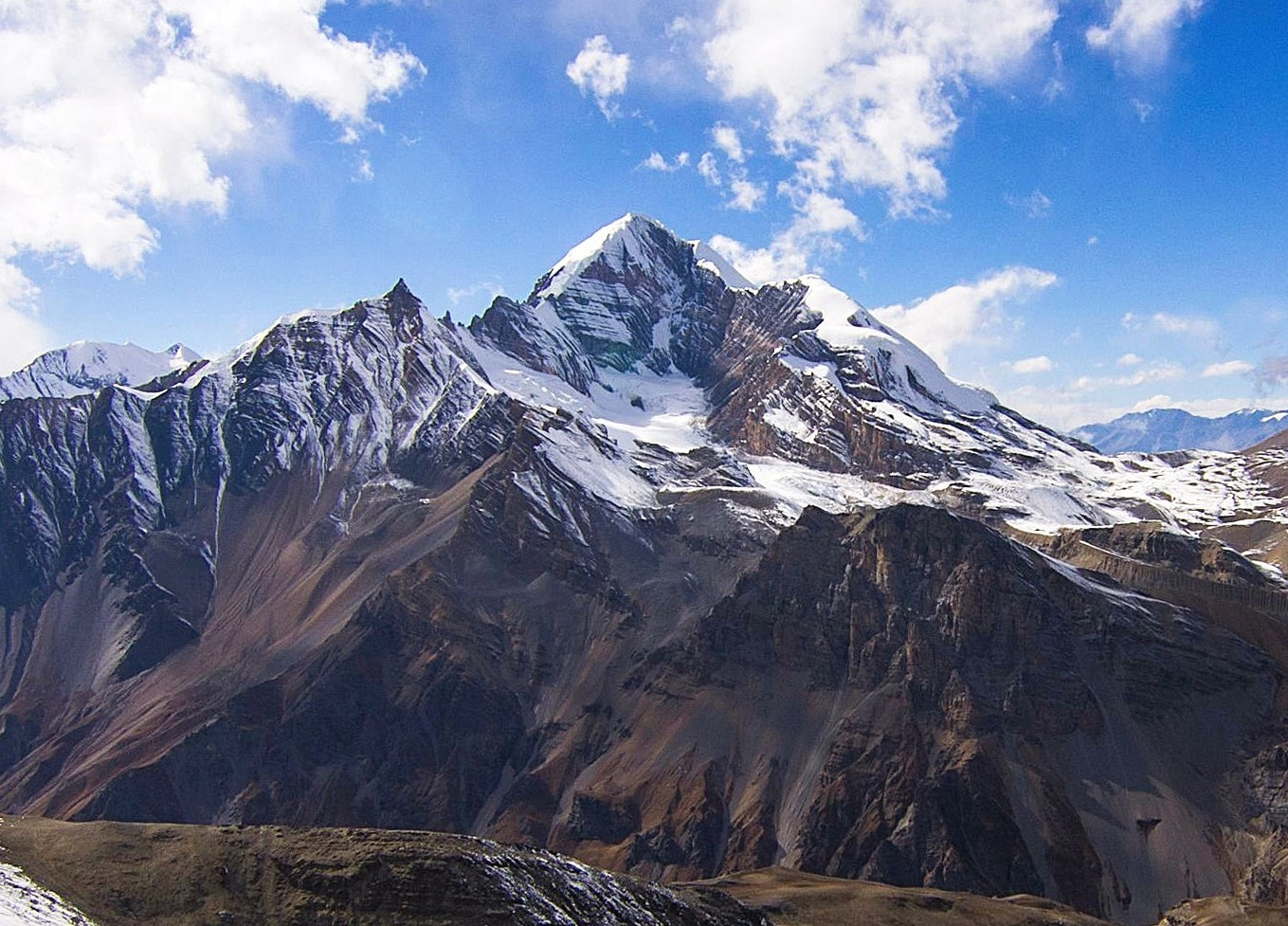
- East aspect

Highest point
- Elevation: 6,484 m (21,273 ft)
- Prominence: 1,068 m (3,504 ft)
- Parent peak: Nemjung
- Isolation: 10.06 km (6.25 mi)
- Coordinates: 28°46′38″N 83°55′09″E

Geography
- Location within Nepal
- Interactive map of Khatung Kang
- Country: Nepal
- Province: Gandaki
- District: Mustang / Manang
- Protected area: Annapurna Conservation Area
- Parent range: Himalayas

Climbing
- First ascent: 1956

Khatung Kang, also known as Khātuṅkāṅ, is a mountain in Nepal.

== Description ==
Khatung Kang is a 6,484-metre (21,273-foot) glaciated summit in the Nepalese Himalayas. It is situated seven kilometres (4.3 mi) southeast of Ranipauwa in Gandaki Province. Precipitation runoff from the mountain's south slopes drains into tributaries of the Marshyangdi River and the north slope drains to the Kali Gandaki. Topographic relief is significant as the north slope rises 1,300 metres (4,265 ft) in two kilometres (1.2 mi). The Annapurna Circuit traverses below the north and east slopes of this peak. This peak is on the list of permitted trekking peaks. The first ascent of the summit was made on April 12, 1956, by Arthur Baumgartner, and Marguerite Deriaz.

== Climate ==
Based on the Köppen climate classification, Khatung Kang is located in a tundra climate zone with cold, snowy winters, and cool summers. Weather systems are forced upwards by the Himalaya mountains (orographic lift), causing heavy precipitation in the form of rainfall and snowfall. Mid-June through early-August is the monsoon season. The months of April, May, September, and October offer the most favorable weather for viewing or climbing this peak.

== Gallery ==
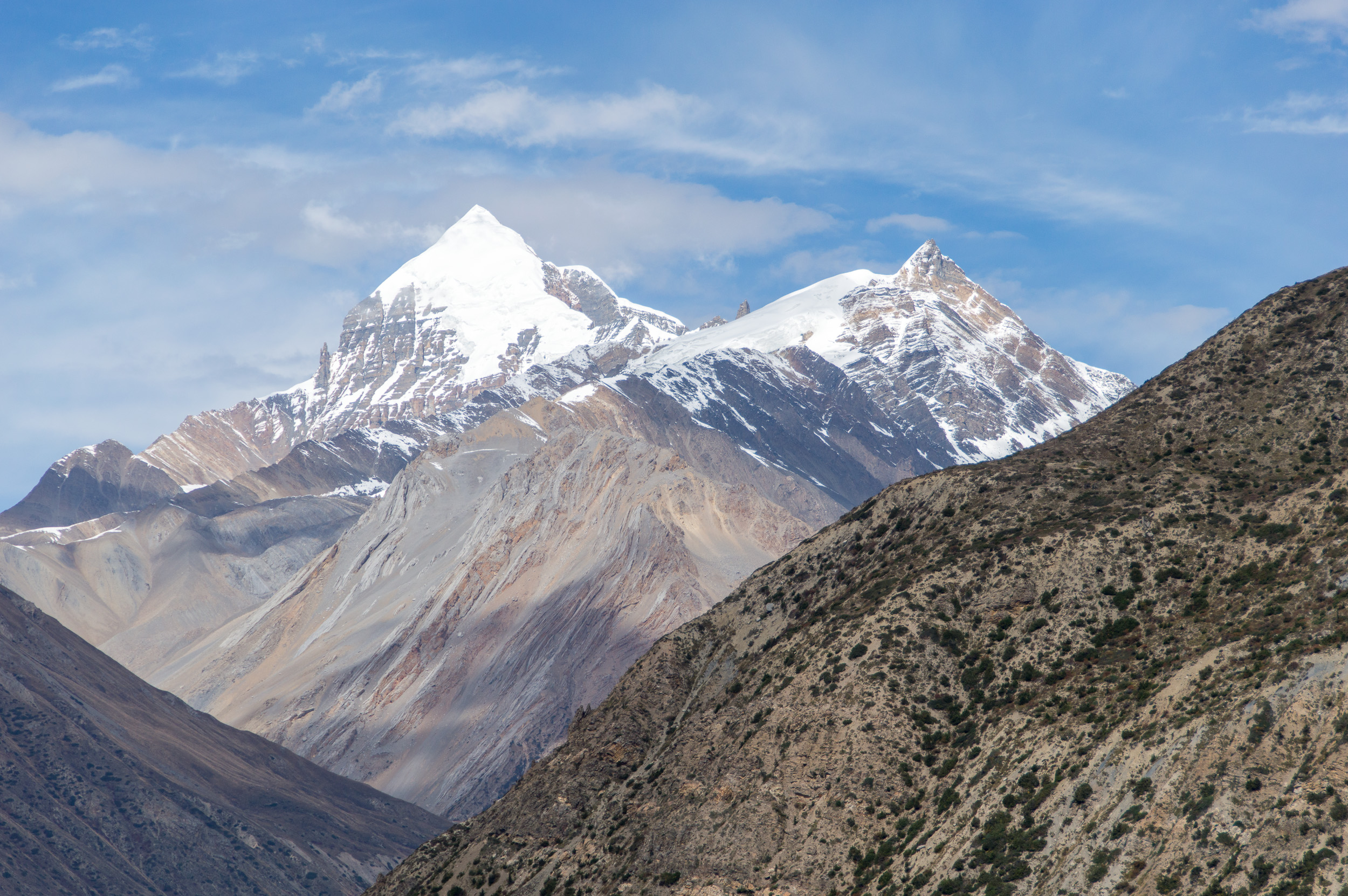
Southeast aspect viewed from Manang

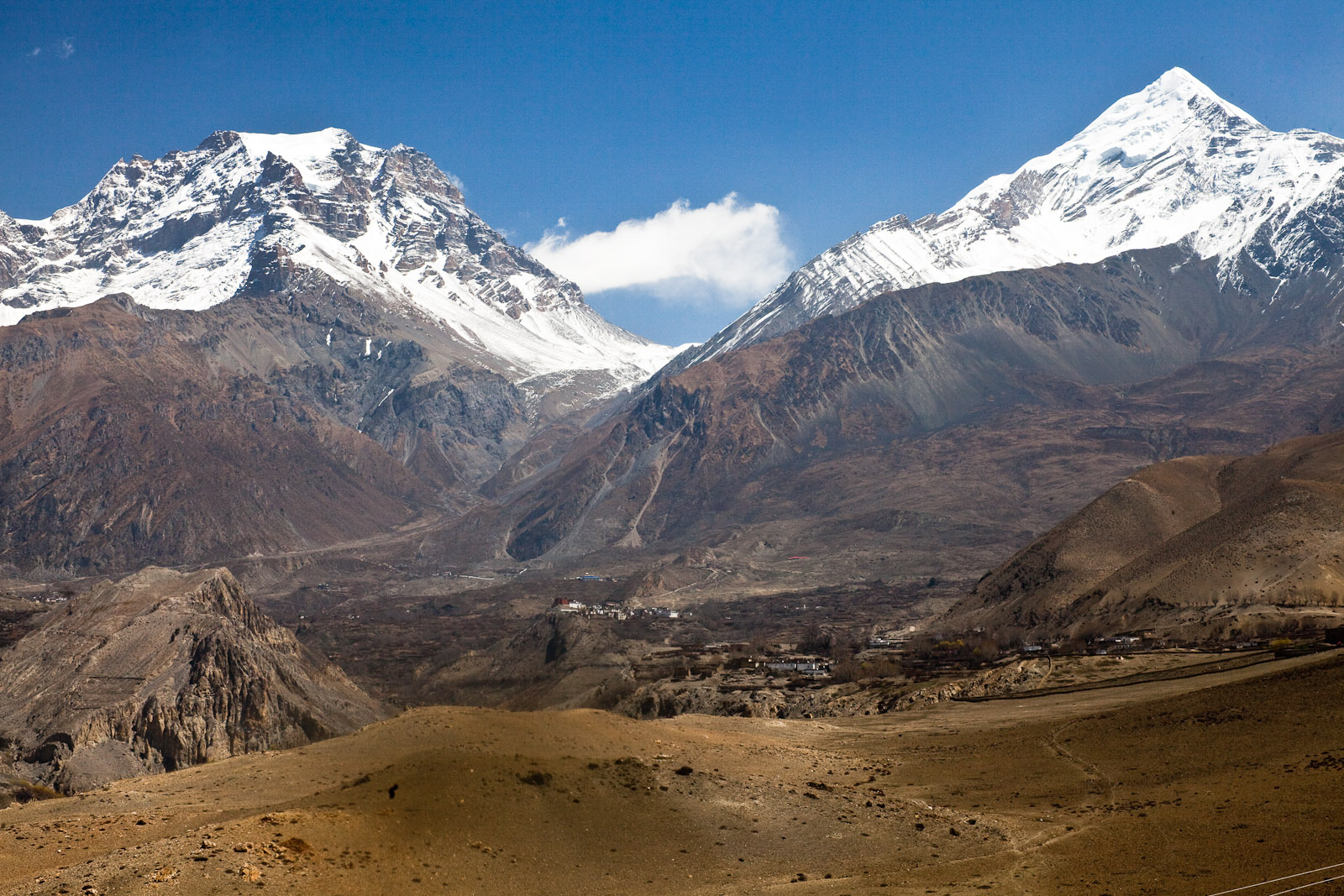
Yakawa Kang (left) and Khatung Kang (right) from west

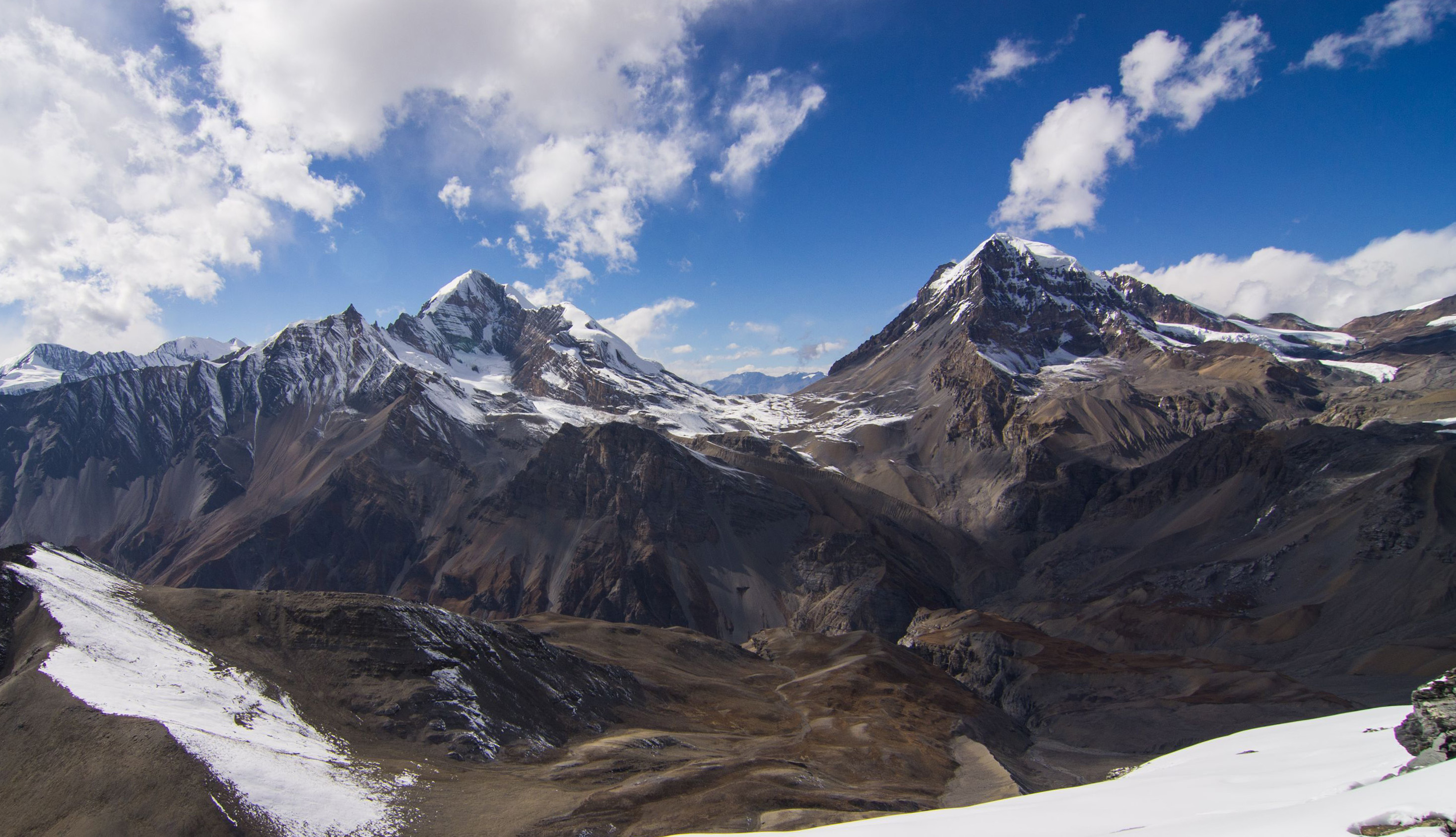
Khatung Kang (left) and Yakawa Kang (right) from east

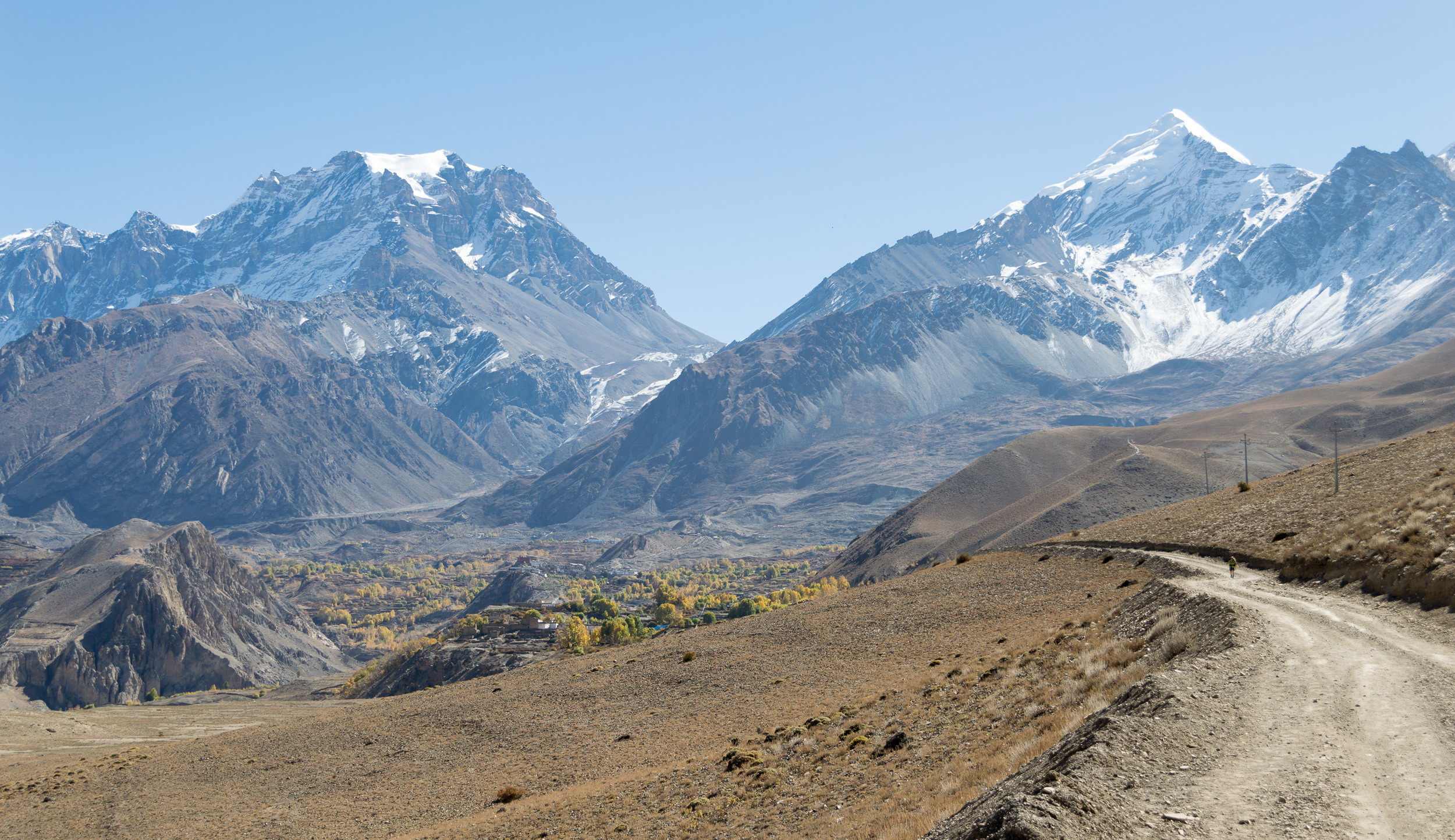
Yakawa Kang (left) and Khatung Kang (right) from west

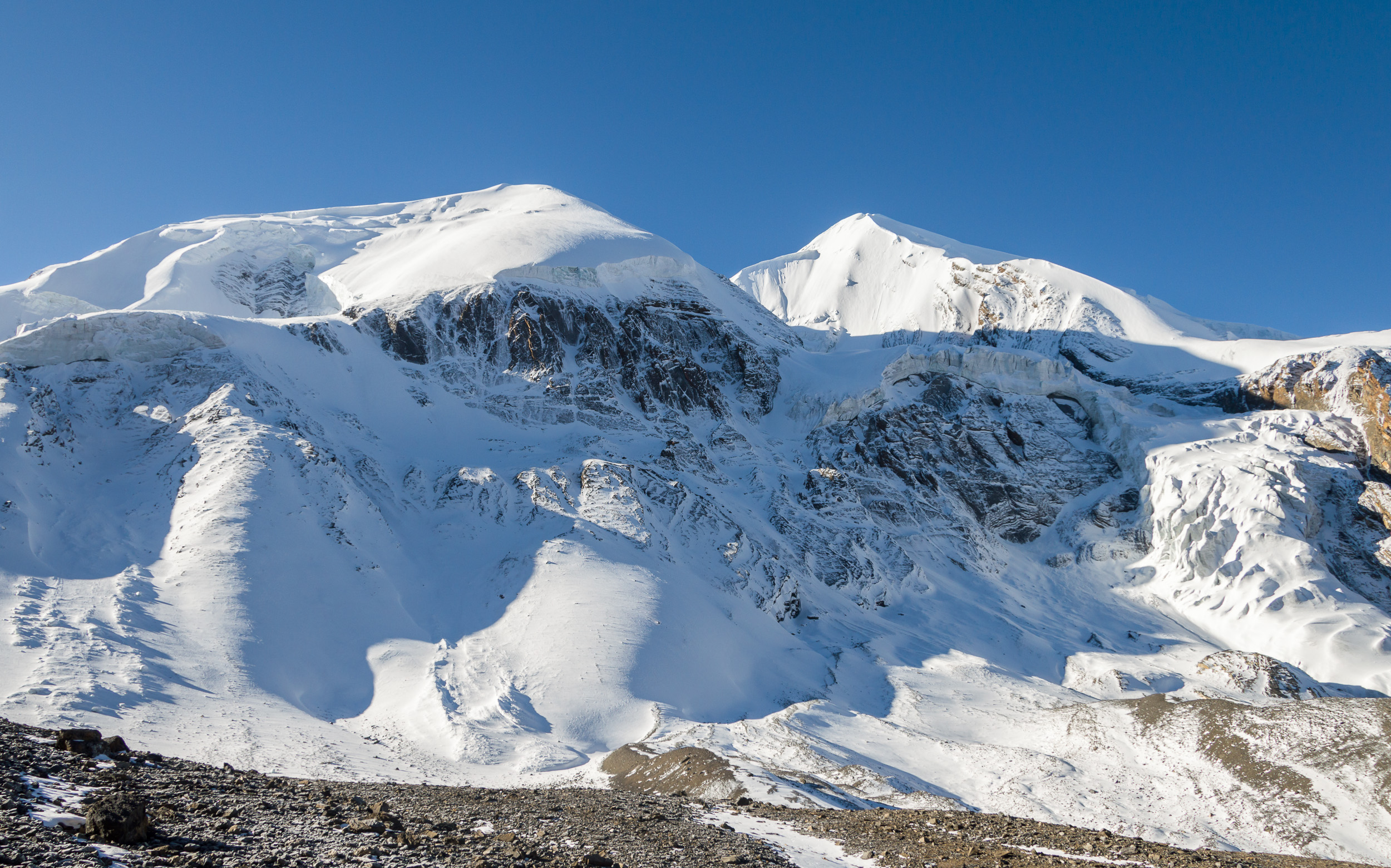
North aspect from Thorong La

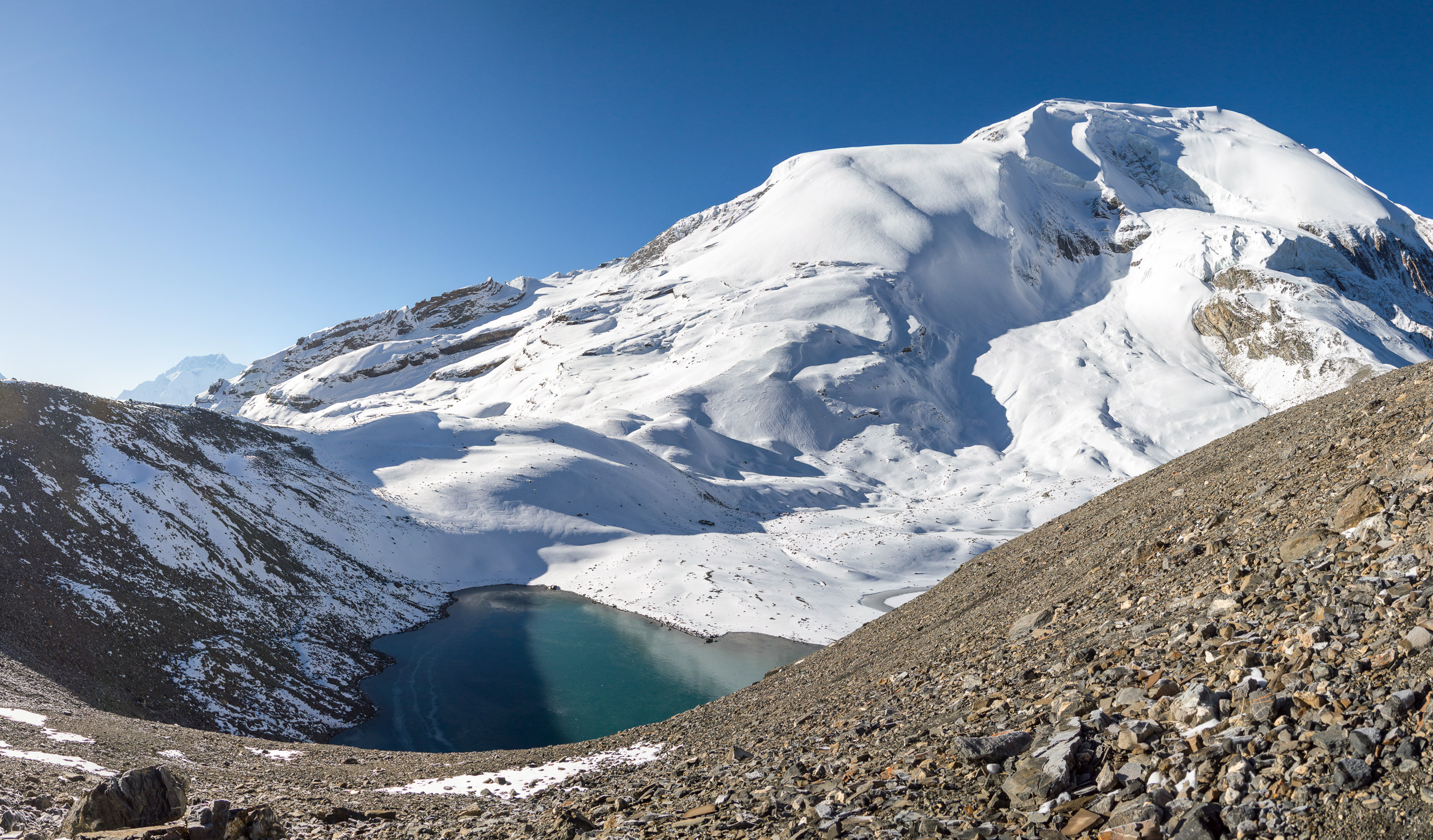
North aspect from Thorong La

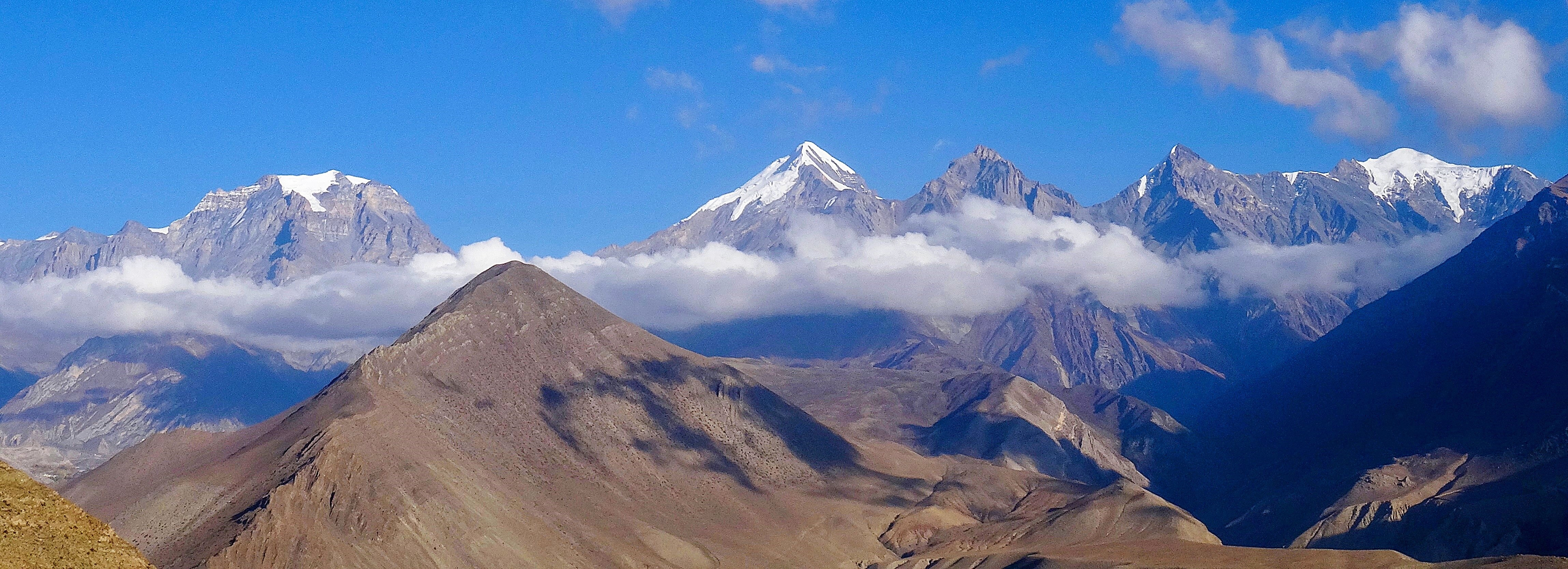
Khatung Kang centered on skyline

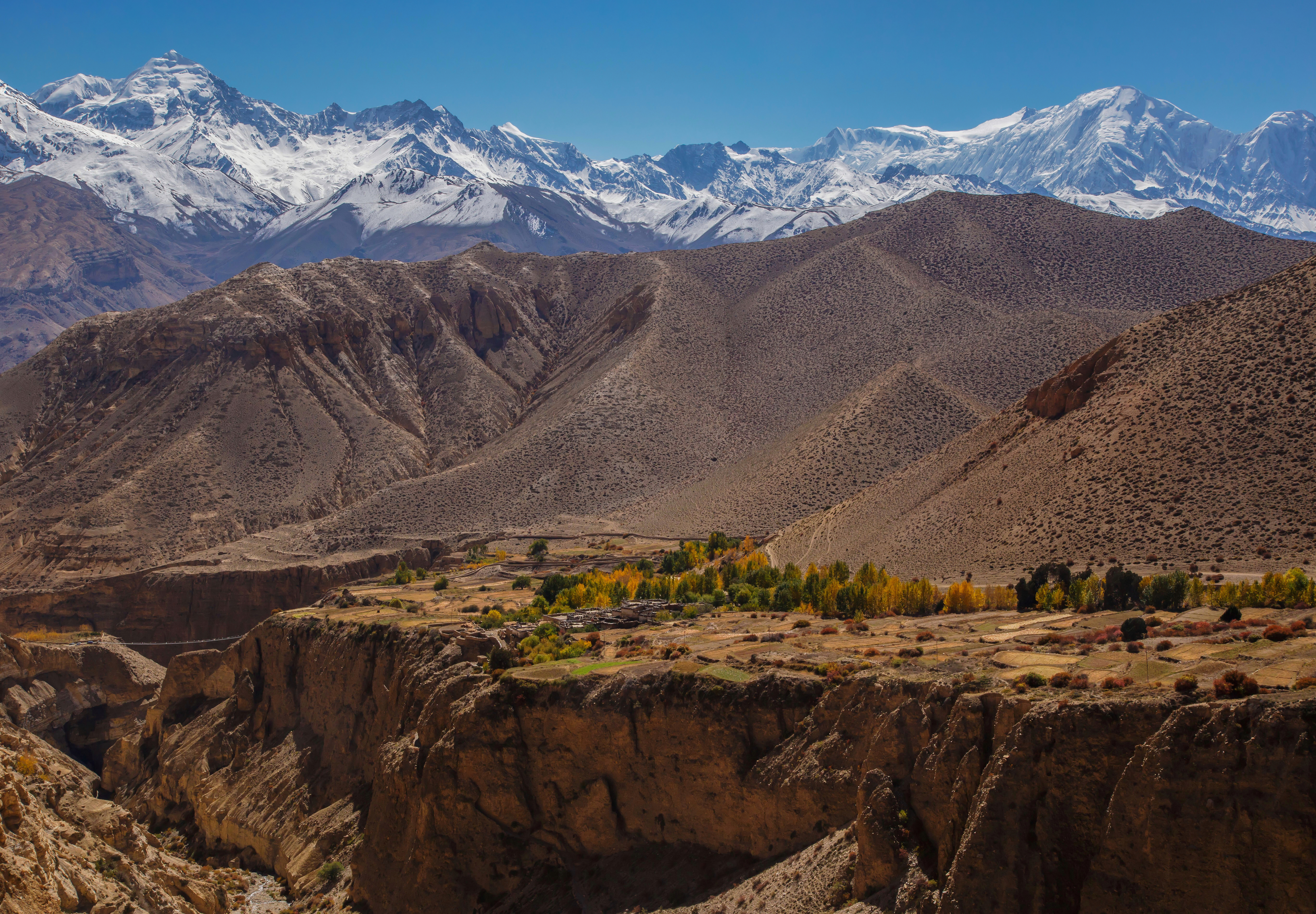
North aspect of Khatung Kang in upper left corner

== See also ==
- Geology of the Himalayas
