= Ranipauwa =

Coordinates: 28.8156°N 83.8633°E

A street in Ranipauwa, often called the village of Muktinath.

Ranipauwa is a locality in central Nepal in the district of Mustang, formerly in the Kingdom of Mustang, about 12140 ft or 3700 m above sea level.

Ranipauwa with its numerous hotels, guesthouses, cafes, restaurants and souvenir-shops is a stop-over for both Hindu and Buddhist pilgrims from all over the world on their way to the Temple of Muktinath as well as for trekkers on the popular Annapurna Circuit that runs around the Annapurna-Himal. When trekking clockwise, Ranipauwa is the last port of call before crossing the Thorong-La-pass (17769 ft / 5416 m above sea level).

Ranipauwa (रानीपौवा) means "Queen's inn" in Nepali. The hamlet developed from the end of the 18th century, when Queen Subarna Prabha Devi of Nepal went on a pilgrimage to Muktinath and patronized the sanctuary. She notably ensured a reliable shelter for pilgrims and travelers journeying toward Muktinath by erecting and funding a Dharmashala, a choultry or inn. It was around this establishment, which has been operating since 1806, that the little town gradually grew and took its name.

== Gallery ==
Ranipauwa seen from the heights

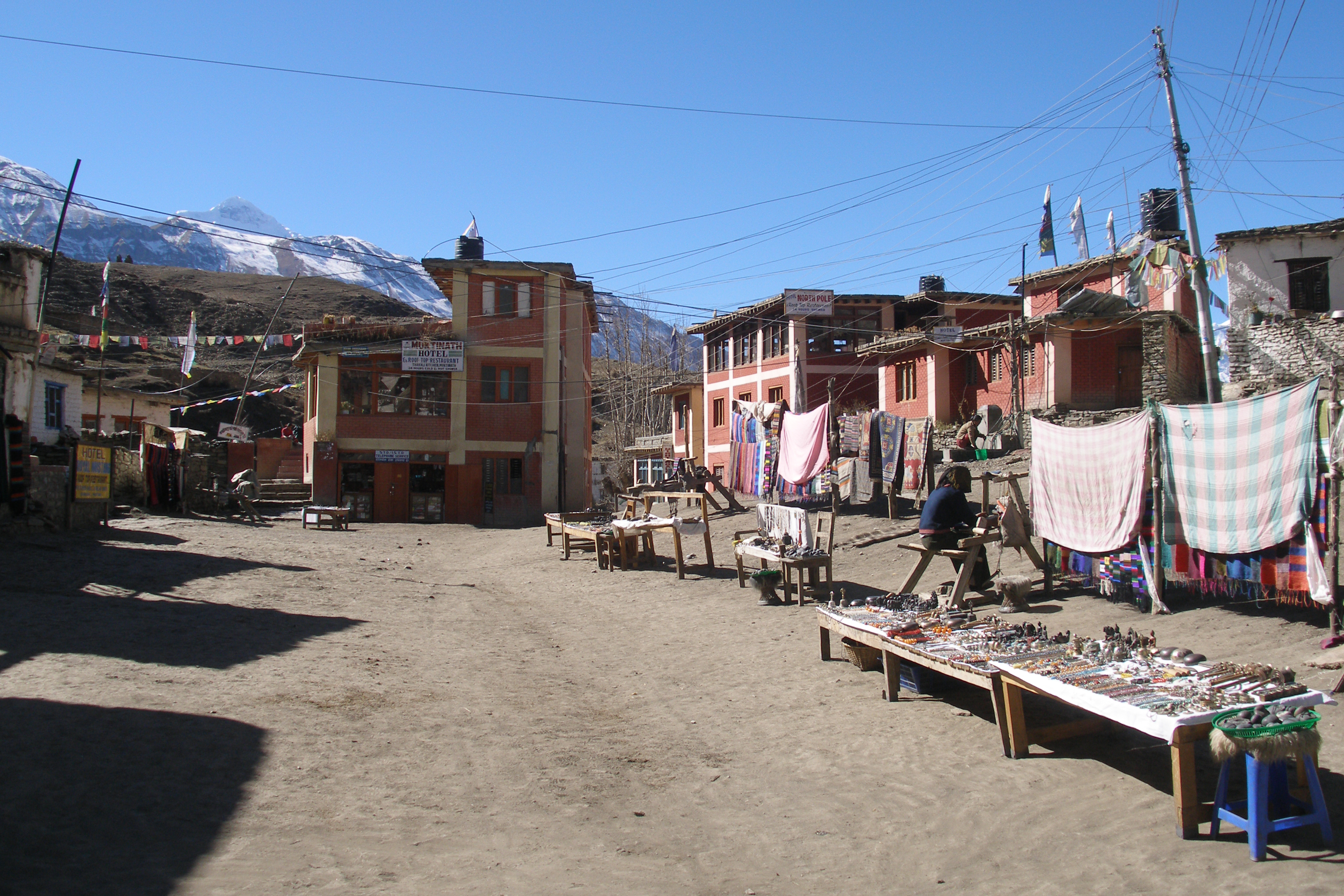
Ranipauwa centre

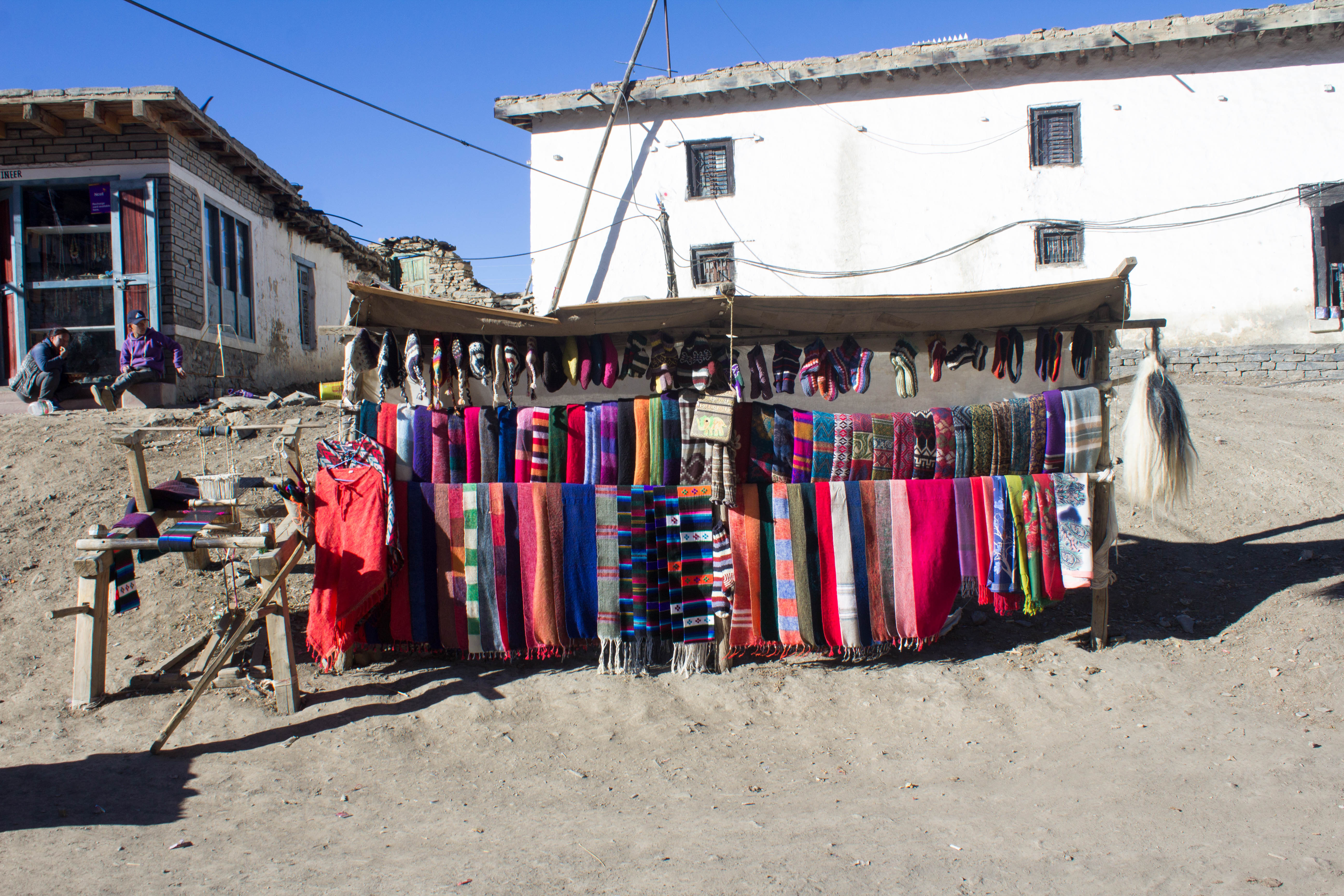
Shop at Ranipauwa

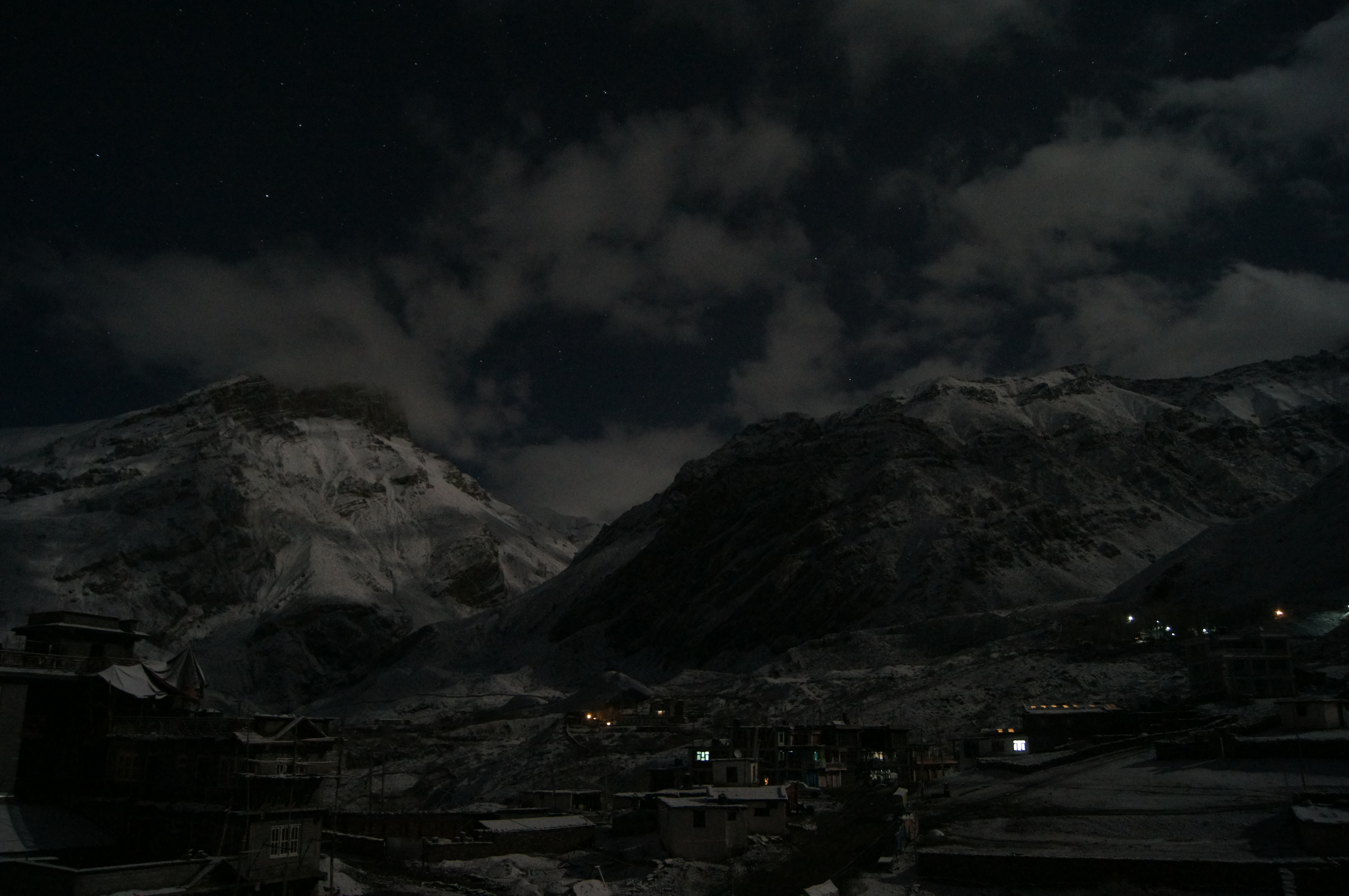
Ranipauwa at night - view towards Muktinath-Temple and the Thorong-La-Pass
