= List of Southeast Asian mountains =

The following is a list of some of the mountains of Southeast Asia.

== List of highest mountains ==
Rank	Name	Height	Location
1	Hkakabo Razi	5,881 m (19,295 ft)	Myanmar
2	Gamlang Razi	5,870 m (19,259 ft)	Myanmar
3	Dindaw Razi	5,466 m (17,933 ft)	Myanmar
4	Tasudo Razi	5,140 m (16,864 ft)	Myanmar
5	Tami Razi	5,101 m (16,736 ft)	Myanmar
6	Sheankala Razi	5,000 m (16,404 ft)	Myanmar
7	Romaing Razi	4,900 m (16,076 ft)	Myanmar
8	Puncak Jaya	4,884 m (16,024 ft)	Indonesia
9	Sumantri	4,870 m (15,978 ft)	Indonesia
10	Ngga Pulu	4,862 m (15,951 ft)	Indonesia
11	Carstensz East	4,820 m (15,814 ft)	Indonesia
12	Peak 4764	4,764 m (15,630 ft)	Myanmar
13	Puncak Mandala	4,760 m (15,617 ft)	Indonesia
14	Puncak Trikora	4,750 m (15,584 ft)	Indonesia
15	Ngga Pilimsit	4,717 m (15,476 ft)	Indonesia
16	Kazi Razi	4,656 m (15,276 ft)	Myanmar
17	Madoi Razi	4,616 m (15,144 ft)	Myanmar
18	Peak 4547	4,547 m (14,918 ft)	Myanmar
19	Mount Yamin	4,541 m (14,898 ft)	Indonesia
20	Mount Speelman	4,540 m (14,895 ft)	Indonesia
21	Masinsang Razi	4,512 m (14,803 ft)	Myanmar
22	J. P. Coen Peak	4,500 m (14,764 ft)	Indonesia
23	Valentiyn Peak	4,453 m (14,610 ft)	Indonesia
24	Peak 4410	4,410 m (14,469 ft)	Myanmar
25	Khambi Madin	4,405 m (14,452 ft)	Myanmar
26	Phangran Razi	4,328 m (14,199 ft)	Myanmar; India
27	Phonyin Razi	4,282 m (14,049 ft)	Myanmar; India
28	Mount Kinabalu	4,095 m (13,435 ft)	Malaysia
29	Ngga Nggulumbulu	4,061 m (13,323 ft)	Indonesia
30	Mount Antares	3,970 m (13,025 ft)	Indonesia
31	Angemuk	3,949 m (12,956 ft)	Indonesia
32	Mount Saramati	3,841 m (12,602 ft)	Myanmar; India
33	Mount Kerinci	3,805 m (12,484 ft)	Indonesia
34	Jumbul Ambera	3,785 m (12,418 ft)	Indonesia
35	Mount Kobowre	3,750 m (12,303 ft)	Indonesia
36	Mount Rinjani	3,727 m (12,228 ft)	Indonesia
37	Mount Semeru	3,676 m (12,060 ft)	Indonesia
38	Hkaru Bum	3,657 m (11,998 ft)	Myanmar
39	Phongan Razi	3,606 m (11,831 ft)	Myanmar; India
*	Mount Rantemario	3,478 m (11,411 ft)	Indonesia
*	Mount Leuser	3,466 m (11,371 ft)	Indonesia
*	Mount Slamet	3,432 m (11,260 ft)	Indonesia
*	Bumhpa Bum	3,411 m (11,191 ft)	Myanmar
*	Mount Sumbing	3,371 m (11,060 ft)	Indonesia
*	Mount Arjuno	3,339 m (10,955 ft)	Indonesia
*	Mount Raung	3,332 m (10,932 ft)	Indonesia
*	Mount Lawu	3,265 m (10,712 ft)	Indonesia
*	Mount Lonkrumadin	3,185 m (10,449 ft)	Myanmar
*	Mount Dempo	3,173 m (10,410 ft)	Indonesia
*	Mount Welirang	3,156 m (10,354 ft)	Indonesia
*	Mount Merbabu	3,145 m (10,318 ft)	Indonesia
*	Fansipan	3,143 m (10,312 ft)	Vietnam
*	Mount Sindoro	3,136 m (10,289 ft)	Indonesia
*	Mount Leuser II	3,119 m (10,233 ft)	Indonesia
*	Mol Len	3,088 m (10,131 ft)	Myanmar
*	Iyang-Argapura	3,088 m (10,131 ft)	Indonesia
*	Mount Ciremai	3,078 m (10,098 ft)	Indonesia
*	Phu Si Lung	3,076 m (10,092 ft)	Vietnam
*	Mount Gandang Dewata	3,074 m (10,085 ft)	Indonesia
*	Nat Ma Taung	3,070 m (10,072 ft)	Myanmar
*	Mount Agung	3,031 m (9,944 ft)	Indonesia
*	Fuyul Sojol	3,030 m (9,941 ft)	Indonesia
*	Mount Binaiya	3,027 m (9,931 ft)	Indonesia
*	Mount Pangrango	3,019 m (9,905 ft)	Indonesia
*	Buyu Balease	3,016 m (9,895 ft)	Indonesia
*	Phu Luong	2,985 m (9,793 ft)	Vietnam
*	Tatamailau	2,963 m (9,721 ft)	Timor Leste
*	Mount Arfak	2,955 m (9,695 ft)	Indonesia
*	Mount Apo	2,954 m (9,692 ft)	Philippines
*	Mount Dulang-dulang	2,938 m (9,639 ft)	Philippines
*	Mount Merapi	2,968 m (9,738 ft)	Indonesia
*	Mount Pulag	2,922 m (9,587 ft)	Philippines
*	Mount Talakmau	2,919 m (9,577 ft)	Indonesia
*	Mount Kitanglad	2,899 m (9,511 ft)	Philippines
*	Mount Marapi	2,885 m (9,465 ft)	Indonesia
*	Geureudong	2,885 m (9,465 ft)	Indonesia
*	Mount Kalatungan	2,880 m (9,449 ft)	Philippines
*	Mount Singgalang	2,877 m (9,439 ft)	Indonesia
*	Moncong Lompobatang	2,874 m (9,429 ft)	Indonesia
*	Bulu Kandela	2,870 m (9,416 ft)	Indonesia
*	Mount Butak	2,868 m (9,409 ft)	Indonesia
*	Mount Tambora	2,850 m (9,350 ft)	Indonesia
*	Mount Patah	2,850 m (9,350 ft)	Indonesia
*	Phou Bia	2,819 m (9,249 ft)	Laos
*	Mount Pungongesong	2,819 m (9,249 ft)	Indonesia
*	Mount Ragang	2,815 m (9,236 ft)	Philippines
*	Peuët Sagoë	2,801 m (9,190 ft)	Indonesia
*	Ijen	2,799 m (9,183 ft)	Indonesia
*	Mount Tujuh	2,732 m (8,963 ft)	Indonesia
*	Phu Xai Lai Leng	2,720 m (8,924 ft)	Laos; Vietnam
*	Mount Kalawitan	2,714 m (8,904 ft)	Philippines
*	Kennedy Peak	2,703 m (8,868 ft)	Myanmar
*	Mount Amuyao	2,702 m (8,865 ft)	Philippines
*	Mount Kapalatmada	2,700 m (8,858 ft)	Indonesia
*	Sangpang Bum	2,692 m (8,832 ft)	Myanmar
*	Loi Leng	2,673 m (8,770 ft)	Myanmar
*	Mount Tagubud	2,670 m (8,760 ft)	Philippines
*	Mount Papandayan	2,665 m (8,743 ft)	Indonesia
*	Mount Mekongga	2,650 m (8,694 ft)	Indonesia
*	Mount Trusmadi	2,643 m (8,671 ft)	Malaysia
*	Mong Ling Shan	2,641 m (8,665 ft)	Myanmar
*	Nattaung	2,623 m (8,606 ft)	Myanmar
*	Ngọc Linh	2,598 m (8,524 ft)	Vietnam
*	Mount Talang	2,597 m (8,520 ft)	Indonesia
*	Mount Halcon	2,586 m (8,484 ft)	Philippines
*	Mount Tambuyukon	2,579 m (8,461 ft)	Malaysia
*	Doi Inthanon	2,565 m (8,415 ft)	Thailand
*	Loi Pangnao	2,563 m (8,409 ft)	Myanmar
*	Mount Balatukan	2,560 m (8,399 ft)	Philippines
*	Mount Mangabon	2,510 m (8,235 ft)	Philippines
*	Bon Irau	2,501 m (8,205 ft)	Indonesia
*	Mount Baco	2,488 m (8,163 ft)	Philippines
*	Bukit Daun	2,467 m (8,094 ft)	Indonesia
*	Mount Kanlaon	2,465 m (8,087 ft)	Philippines
*	Mount Mayon	2,463 m (8,081 ft)	Philippines
*	Mount Sinabung	2,460 m (8,071 ft)	Indonesia
*	Mount Mutis	2,427 m (7,963 ft)	Indonesia
*	Mount Murud	2,423 m (7,949 ft)	Malaysia
*	Mount Malindang	2,404 m (7,887 ft)	Philippines
*	Mount Chiêu Lầu Thi	2,402 m (7,881 ft)	Vietnam
*	Mount Mulu	2,376 m (7,795 ft)	Malaysia
*	Matebian	2,372 m (7,782 ft)	Timor Leste
*	Poco Mandasawu (Ranakah)	2,370 m (7,776 ft)	Indonesia
*	Mount Bromo	2,329 m (7,641 ft)	Indonesia
*	Bukit Raya	2,300 m (7,546 ft)	Indonesia
*	Mount Matutum	2,286 m (7,500 ft)	Philippines
*	Doi Pha Hom Pok	2,285 m (7,497 ft)	Thailand
*	Mount Sibayak	2,212 m (7,257 ft)	Indonesia
*	Mount Salak	2,211 m (7,254 ft)	Indonesia
*	Mount Tahan	2,187 m (7,175 ft)	Malaysia
*	Mount Korbu	2,183 m (7,162 ft)	Malaysia
*	Mount Yong Belar	2,180 m (7,152 ft)	Malaysia
*	Doi Chiang Dao	2,175 m (7,136 ft)	Thailand
*	Mount Chamah	2,171 m (7,123 ft)	Malaysia
*	Mount Banahaw	2,170 m (7,119 ft)	Philippines
*	Galunggung	2,168 m (7,113 ft)	Indonesia
*	Phu Soi Dao	2,120 m (6,955 ft)	Thailand; Laos
*	Mount Madjaas	2,117 m (6,946 ft)	Philippines
*	Buku Sibela	2,111 m (6,926 ft)	Indonesia
*	Mount Irau	2,110 m (6,923 ft)	Malaysia
*	Mount Benum	2,107 m (6,913 ft)	Malaysia
*	Mount Mantalingajan	2,085 m (6,841 ft)	Philippines
*	Phou Khe	2,079 m (6,821 ft)	Thailand; Laos
*	Mount Nangtud	2,074 m (6,804 ft)	Philippines
*	Myinmoletkat Taung	2,072 m (6,798 ft)	Myanmar
*	Mount Guiting-Guiting	2,058 m (6,752 ft)	Philippines
*	Bukit Batu Lawi	2,046 m (6,713 ft)	Malaysia
*	Mount Tapulao	2,037 m (6,683 ft)	Philippines
*	Doi Mae Tho	2,031 m (6,663 ft)	Thailand
*	Mount Isarog	2,000 m (6,562 ft)	Philippines
*	Doi Phu Kha	1,980 m (6,496 ft)	Thailand
*	Mount Baloy	1,958 m (6,424 ft)	Philippines
*	Mount Talinis	1,903 m (6,243 ft)	Philippines
*	Mount Mandalagan	1,885 m (6,184 ft)	Philippines
*	Bukit Pagon	1,850 m (6,070 ft)	Brunei
*	Khao Luang	1,840 m (6,037 ft)	Thailand
*	Phnom Aural	1,813 m (5,948 ft)	Cambodia
*	Mount Batur	1,717 m (5,633 ft)	Indonesia
*	Mount Mambajao	1,713 m (5,620 ft)	Philippines
*	Mount Muria	1,602 m (5,256 ft)	Indonesia
*	Mount Malinao	1,548 m (5,079 ft)	Philippines
*	Mount Labo	1,544 m (5,066 ft)	Philippines
*	Mount Silay	1,535 m (5,036 ft)	Philippines
*	Mount Popa	1,518 m (4,980 ft)	Myanmar
*	Mount Nuang	1,493 m (4,898 ft)	Malaysia
*	Mount Pinatubo	1,486 m (4,875 ft)	Philippines
*	Mount Mariveles	1,398 m (4,587 ft)	Philippines
*	Alto Peak	1,332 m (4,370 ft)	Philippines
*	Mount Masaraga	1,328 m (4,357 ft)	Philippines
*	Mount Ledang	1,276 m (4,186 ft)	Malaysia
*	Mount Ten	1,244 m (4,081 ft)	Vietnam
*	Mount Jerai	1,217 m (3,993 ft)	Malaysia
*	Mount Malindig	1,160 m (3,806 ft)	Philippines
*	Mount Makiling	1,090 m (3,576 ft)	Philippines
*	Mount Malarayat	1,077 m (3,533 ft)	Philippines
*	Mount Arayat	1,026 m (3,366 ft)	Philippines
*	Mount Maculot	957 m (3,140 ft)	Philippines
*	Krakatoa	813 m (2,667 ft)	Indonesia
*	Mount Bombalai	531 m (1,742 ft)	Malaysia
*	Mount Agad-Agad	490 m (1,608 ft)	Philippines

== See also ==
- List of highest mountains
- List of highest mountains of New Guinea
- List of islands by highest point
- List of ribus (summits in Indonesia with 1000 m topographic prominence)
- Seven Summits
