= New Guinea Highlands =

- Natural region
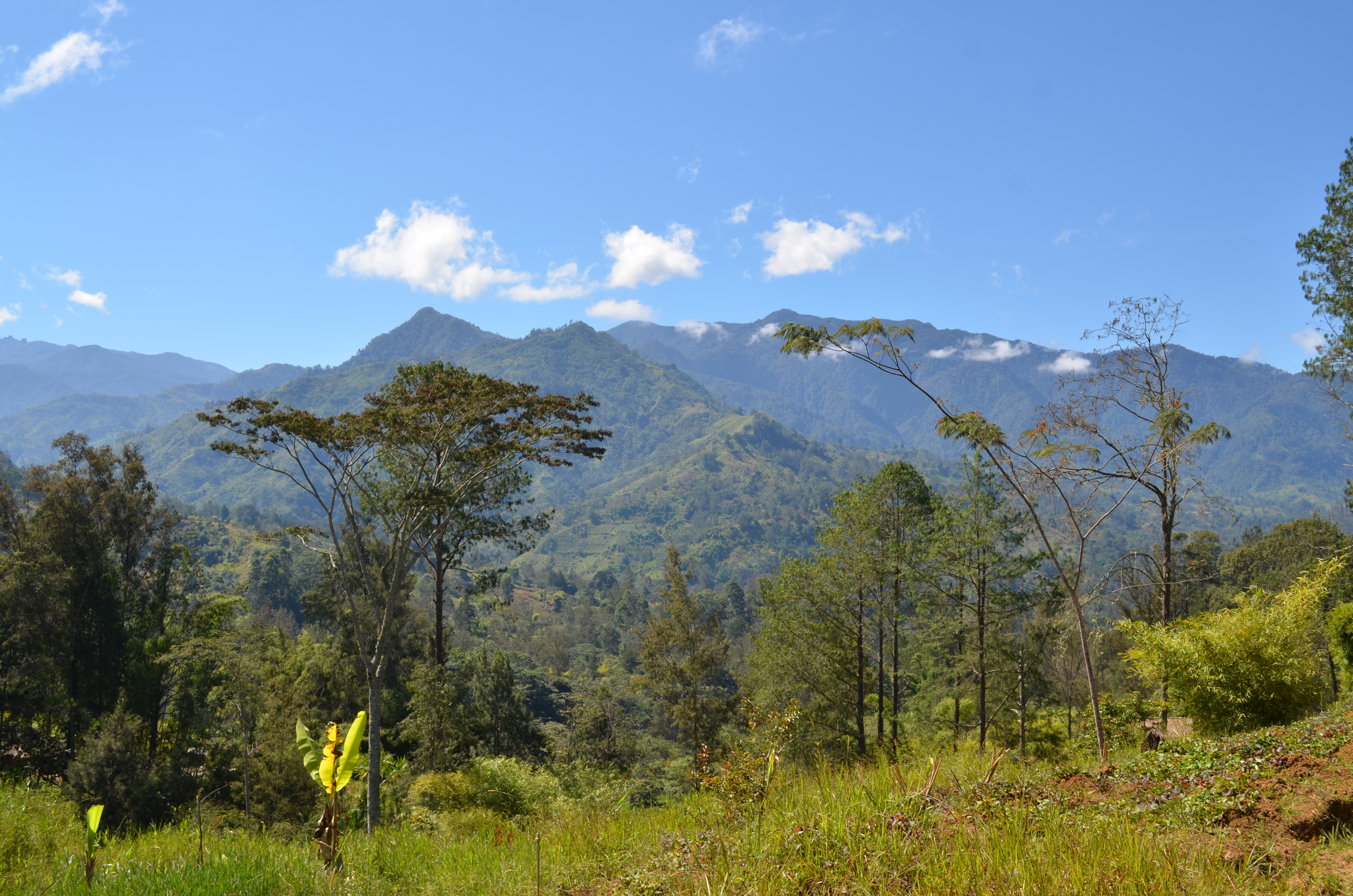
- Landscape in the New Guinea Highlands

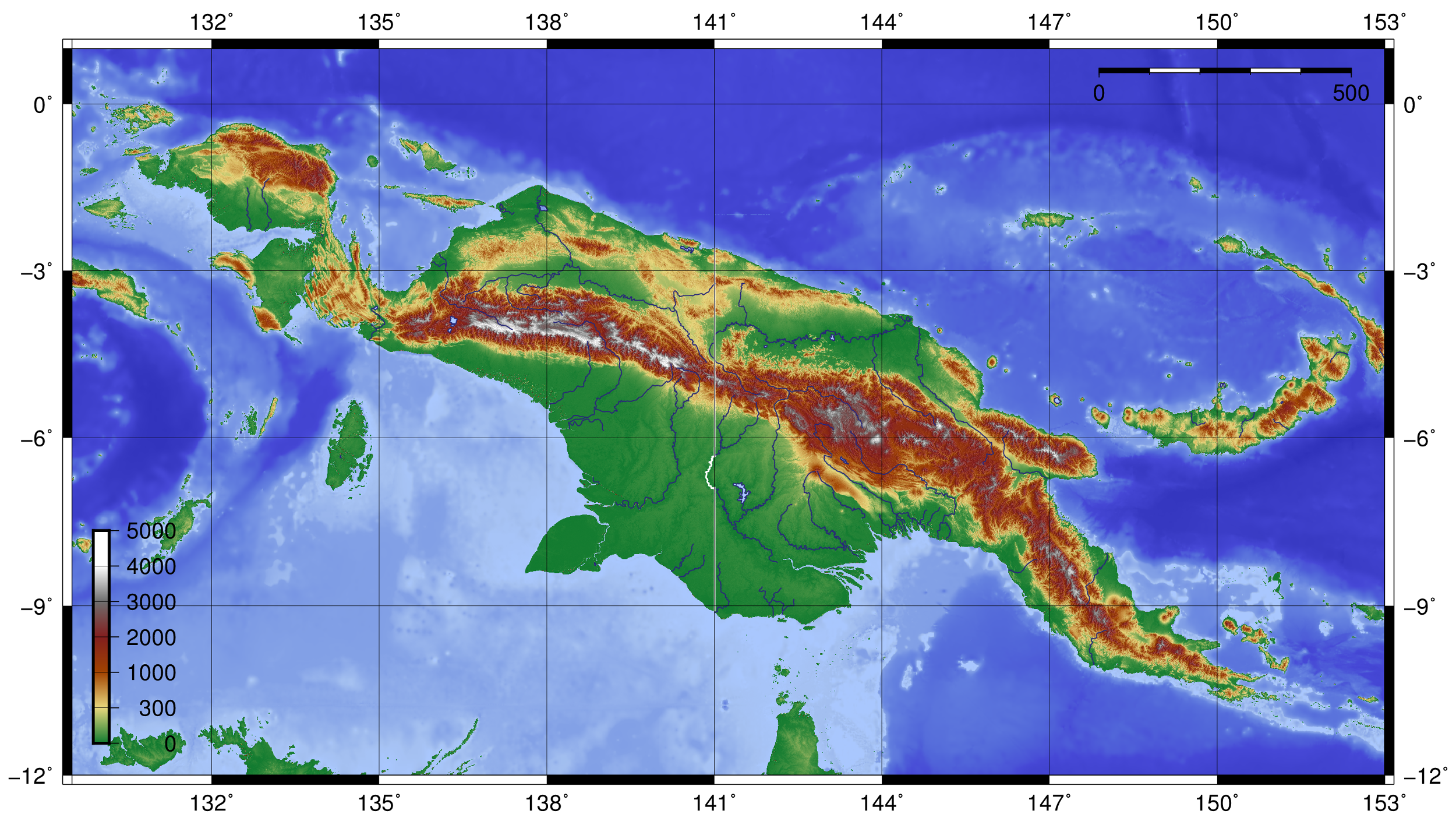
- Topographic map of New Guinea. The New Guinea Highlands are the large mountain chain crossing almost the entire island
- Island: New Guinea

Area
  - Total: 142,840 km^{2} (55,150 sq mi)

Dimensions
  - Length: 1,900 km (1,200 mi)
  - Width: 165 km (103 mi)
- Elevation: 4,884 m (16,024 ft)

The New Guinea Highlands, also known as the Central Range or Central Cordillera, is a long chain of mountain ranges on the island of New Guinea, including the island's highest peak, Puncak Jaya, Indonesia, 16,024 ft (4,884 m), the highest mountain in Oceania. The range is home to many intermountain river valleys, many of which support thriving agricultural communities. The highlands run generally east-west the length of the island, which is divided politically between Indonesia in the west and Papua New Guinea in the east. These mountains stretch from the Weyland Mountains starting in Wondama Bay Regency in the west to the Milne Bay Province in the east.

== Geography ==
The Central Cordillera, some peaks of which are capped with ice, consists of (from east to west): the Central Highlands and Eastern Highlands of Papua New Guinea including the Owen Stanley Range in the southeast, whose highest peak is Mount Victoria at 4,038 metres (13,248 feet), the Albert Victor Mountains, the Sir Arthur Gordon Range, and the Bismarck Range, whose highest peak is Mount Wilhelm at 4,509 metres (14,793 feet), which is an extinct volcano with a crater lake; the Star Mountains on the Papua New Guinea–Indonesia border; and the Maoke Mountains or Snow Range in Indonesia, where perpetual snow was found by H. A. Lorentz in 1909 at 4,461 m (14,635 ft), and whose highest peaks are Puncak Jaya (Mt. Carstensz) at 4,884 m (16,024 feet), Puncak Mandala (Mt. Juliana) at 4,760 m (15,610 ft) and Puncak Trikora (Mt. Wilhelmina) at 4,750 m (15,580 ft).

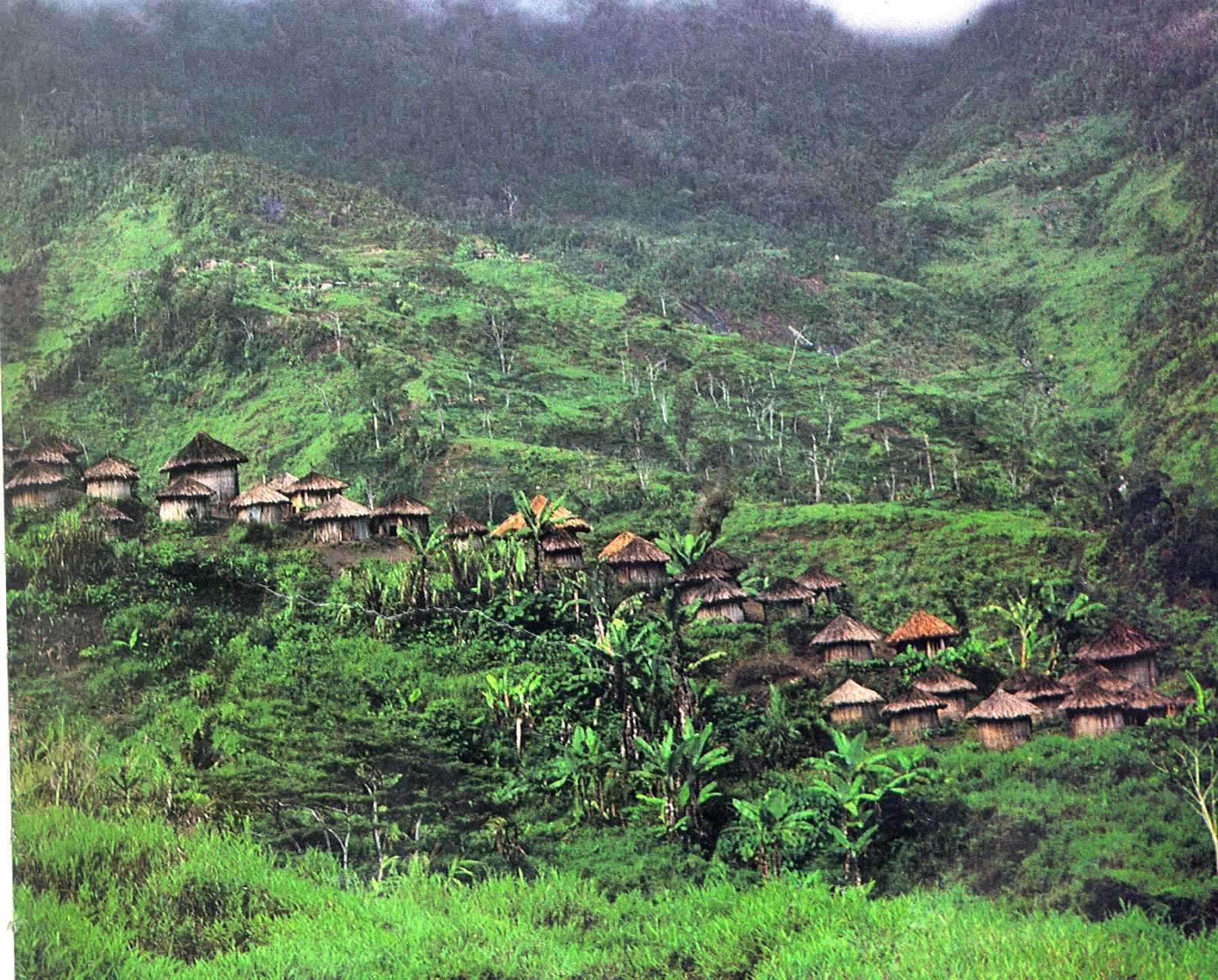
A Yali village in Ilugwa, Central Mamberamo, Highland Papua

Although some valleys such as the Waghi Valley in the Western Highlands, Papua New Guinea are heavily cultivated and support urban settlements most of the mountains have traditional tribal village communities in the grassy mountain valleys. The PNG highland provinces are Eastern Highlands Province; Simbu Province (or Chimbu) whose centre is the small coffee-growing town of Kundiawa on the Wahgi River near Mount Wilhelm; Jiwaka Province; the Western Highlands; the rugged Enga Province the home of the Enga people with its administration in the very small town of Wabag on the Lai River, and containing the large Porgera Gold Mine; Hela Province; Southern Highlands Province, with its centre in the small town and airport of Mendi, and containing the Huli wigmen area around the town of Tari; and parts of West Sepik Province and Western Province. The Highlands Highway connects many of these towns. Larger urban areas in the PNG Highlands include the Western Highlands capital and PNG's 3rd largest city Mount Hagen (near the extinct Mount Hagen (volcano)), the Eastern Highlands capital and former colonial town of Goroka, and the mining town of Tabubil. The climate is humid, but the higher mountain slopes are cooler than the lowlands.

The Highlands are the source of several important rivers including the Sepik River and Ramu River in the north and the Fly River in the south, and lakes including Lake Kutubu, near which oil has been extracted since 1992 by Chevron. Mining is also very active in the region to the detriment of indigenous groups, with frequent friction.

=== Topography ===
List of highest peaks in New Guinea Highlands by elevation.

Peaks by elevation
| Mountain | Elevation |
|---|---|
| Puncak Jaya | 16,024 ft (4,884 m) |
| Sumantri | 15,980 ft (4,870 m) |
| Ngga Pulu | 15,951 ft (4,862 m) |
| Carstensz East | 15,810 ft (4,820 m) |
| Carstensz Timur | 15,758 ft (4,803 m) |
| Puncak Mandala | 15,620 ft (4,760 m) |
| Puncak Trikora | 15,580 ft (4,750 m) |
| Ngga Pilimsit | 15,476 ft (4,717 m) |
| Middenspits | 15,426 ft (4,702 m) |
| Mount Yamin | 14,900 ft (4,541 m) |
| Wachter | 14,865 ft (4,531 m) |
| Gunung Speelman | 14,859 ft (4,529 m) |
| Mount Wilhelm | 14,793 ft (4,509 m) |
| JP Coen Peak | 14,764 ft (4,500 m) |
| Valentijn Peak | 14,609 ft (4,453 m) |
| Mount Giluwe | 14,327 ft (4,367 m) |
| Mount Kubor | 14,301 ft (4,359 m) |
| Mount Boising | 13,615 ft (4,150 m) |
| Mount Bangeta | 13,520 ft (4,120 m) |
| Mt. Kabangama | 13,464 ft (4,104 m) |
| Mount Victoria | 13,248 ft (4,038 m) |
| Mt. Albert Edward | 13,091 ft (3,990 m) |
| Mount Capella | 12,992 ft (3,960 m) |
| Mount Hagen | 12,395 ft (3,778 m) |
| Mount Suckling | 12,060 ft (3,676 m) |
| Mount Michael | 11,965 ft (3,647 m) |
| Mount Arfak | 9,695 ft (2,955 m) |
| Mount Bosavi | 8,225 ft (2,507 m) |

=== Rivers ===
List of rivers in New Guinea Highlands by length.

Rivers by Length
| River | Length |
|---|---|
| Sepik River | 1,146 km (712 mi) |
| Mamberamo River | 1,112 km (691 mi) |
| Fly River | 1,060 km (660 mi) |
| Digul River | 853 km (530 mi) |
| Strickland River | 824 km (512 mi) |
| Taritatu River | 808 km (502 mi) |
| Purari River | 710 km (440 mi) |
| Ramu River | 640 km (400 mi) |
| Tariku River | 488 km (303 mi) |
| Wawoi River | 482 km (300 mi) |
| Kikori River | 445 km (277 mi) |
| Baliem River | 414 km (257 mi) |
| Pulau River | 403 km (250 mi) |
| Turama River | 302 km (188 mi) |
| Apaoewar River | 267 km (166 mi) |
| Wahgi River | 243 km (151 mi) |
| Erave River | 224 km (139 mi) |
| Ok Tedi River | 207 km (129 mi) |
| Markham River | 180 km (110 mi) |
| Kumusi River | 167 km (104 mi) |
| Gami River | 160 km (99 mi) |
| Ka River | 152 km (94 mi) |
| Aikwa River | 128 km (80 mi) |
| Kaugel River | 113 km (70 mi) |

== Geology ==
This chain of mountains continues to rise (with corresponding quakes) as the Australian Plate collides with the plates to the northeast, marking the southern boundaries of the Maoke and Woodlark plates. The width of the mountain range varies considerably, with a central thin segment near the borders of the two nations.

The surface geology of the highlands is made up of metamorphic and intrusive igneous rocks. The metamorphic rocks were Cretaceous and Eocene ocean sediments that were uplifted and folded between the Eocene and early Miocene periods. There are also Pleistocene stratovolcanoes in the highlands, including Mount Hagen and Mount Giluwe.

== History ==
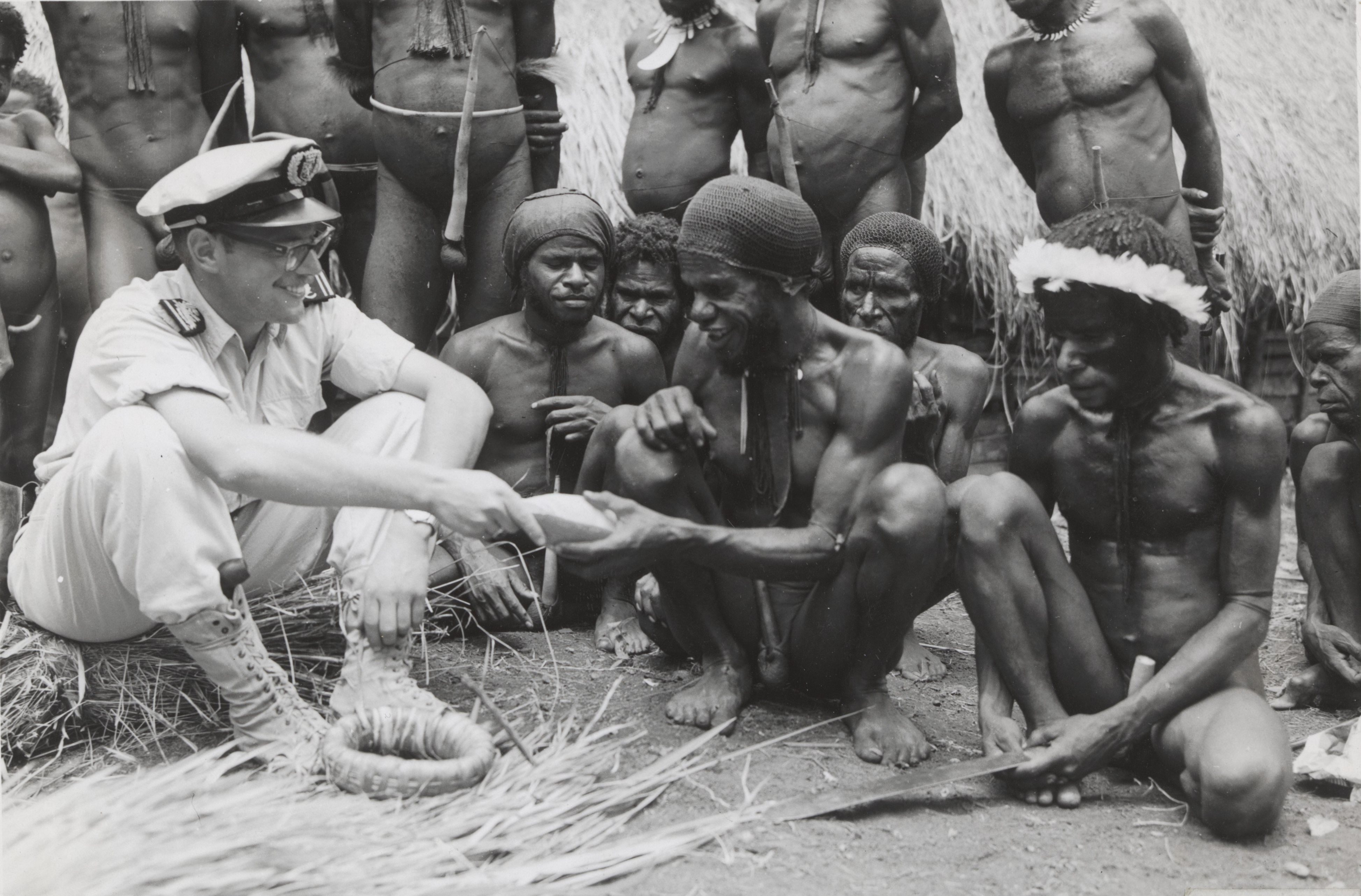
Dutch officer in Baliem Valley, 1958

The fertile Highlands have long been inhabited and artifacts uncovered in the Ivane Valley indicate that the Highlands were first settled about 50,000 years ago. The inhabitants were nomadic foragers but around 10,000 years ago began developing a fairly advanced agricultural society. Before the introduction of the sweet potato, the Highlands had distinct forms of division of labor. In the Eastern Highlands the economy was mixed, with men hunting and cultivating, and women gathering and tending crops. Populations were small, dispersed, and focused on immediate consumption. In the Western Highlands, women were focused on producing large amounts of taro, while men abandoned hunting and were instead focused on animal husbandry and trading. The introduction of the sweet potato had a significant impact on animal husbandry in the area. As it could be used as pig fodder without the need for cooking, societies that adopted this new staple food were able to rapidly amass pigs. These pigs were then traded with surrounding societies, becoming the centerpiece of early economies in the area.

The Highlands were not settled by the Western powers during the early colonial period and they were first visited by western zoologists and explorers, such as Mick Leahy, who opened the Wahgi Valley and Mount Hagen, and Richard Archbold in the 1930s. It was found that the highland valleys explored in the 1930s were inhabited by over a million people. During World War II, the eastern highlands saw the Kokoda Track campaign in which Australian and New Zealand soldiers, along with native guides who were pressed into service, fought and ultimately stopped the Japanese from advancing south towards Port Moresby and, ultimately, northern Queensland on the Australian mainland.

In the Australian-administered Territory of Papua and New Guinea, the Highlands Labour Scheme (1950–1974) promoted the recruitment of Highlands contract labourers to fill a labour shortage in the coastal regions. The scheme resulted in the greater integration of the Highlands into the monetary economy and the introduction of previous unknown goods.

== Culture ==
The culture of inter-tribal warfare and animosity between the neighboring tribes have long been present in the Highlands.

== Ecology ==
The New Guinea Highlands are home to a great variety of Australasian plant and animal communities, distinct from the surrounding lowlands to the north and south of the central ranges and varying up and along the mountain ranges. The habitats of the mountains have been separated into two ecoregions, depending on their elevation, the tropical montane forests and alpine grasslands, but within these broad bands there is a variety of wildlife along the island as some of the mountains stand quite a distance from others with some species of plant or animal existing on only one or two mountains. Particular centres of plant diversity are the Star Mountains area of western Papua New Guinea near the Indonesian border including Telefomin and Strickland Gorge; the Hunstein Range; Mount Giluwe, a major birdwatching area for birds-of-paradise; the volcanic limestone Kubor Range; the Bismarck Range/Mount Wilhelm/Schrader Range/Mount Gahavisuka, of which Mount Wilhelm is particularly rich in endemic species; and finally the Crater Mountain and Mount Michael in the Eastern Highlands.

=== Central Range montane rain forests ===
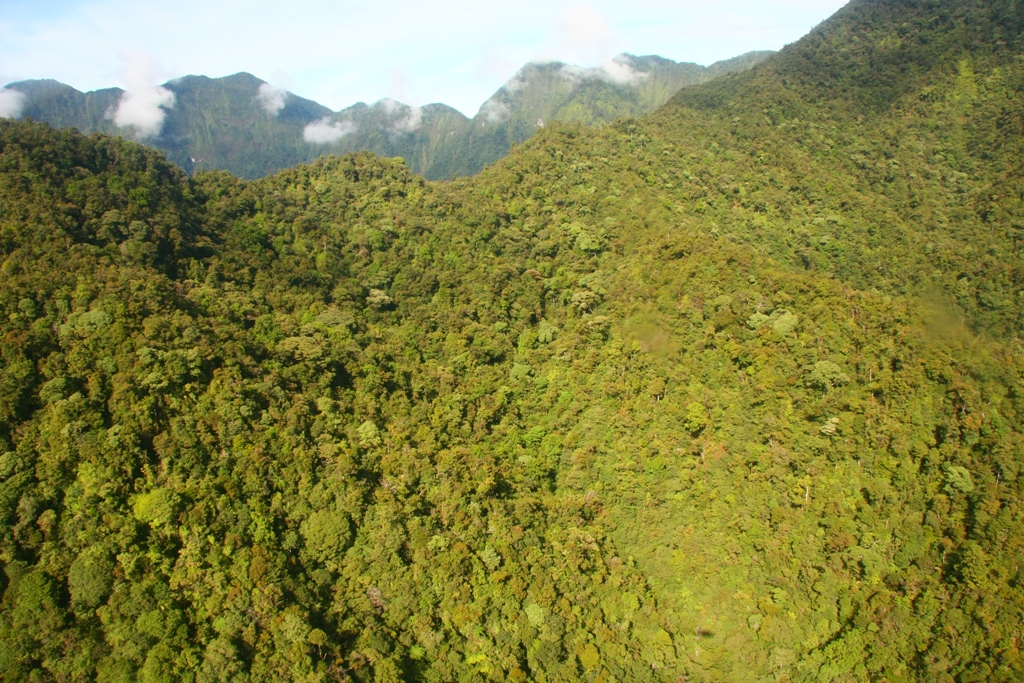
Mount Bosavi

The montane rain forests (from 1,000 to 3,000m) can be further categorised into three broad vegetation zones on the mountains, distinguished by elevation. The lower montane forests extend from 1,000 to 1,500 metres elevation. They are dominated by broadleaf evergreen trees, including Castanopsis acuminatissima, Lithocarpus spp., elaeocarps, and laurels. Coniferous Araucarias may form thick stands. The upper montane forests, which extend from 1,500 to 2,500 metres in elevation, are dominated by moss-covered Nothofagus. Finally, the high mountain forest extends from 2,500 to 3,000 metres in elevation. Conifers (Podocarpus, Dacrycarpus, Dacrydium, Papuacedrus, Araucaria, and Libocedrus) and broadleaf trees of the myrtle family (Myrtaceae) form a thin canopy, with a prominent understory.

The montane forests are home to a rich wildlife, a great deal of which is unique to these mountains including many plants, reptiles, and over 100 birds and animals. Of the 90 mammals found on the island, 44 are endemic, a very high proportion. The birds and animals include many Australasian species such as tree-kangaroos, bowerbirds, Australasian robins, honeyeaters, and birds of paradise. Four of the endemic mammals are critically endangered: the Bulmer's fruit bat, with only tiny communities remaining in the Papua New Guinea end of the island, and three rodents; a large Leptomys, the eastern shrew mouse, and the lesser small-toothed rat. There are 55 bird species endemic to the mountains from a total of 348 birds found here. There are several endemic butterflies, particularly in the Weyland Mountains and the Wahgi Valley.

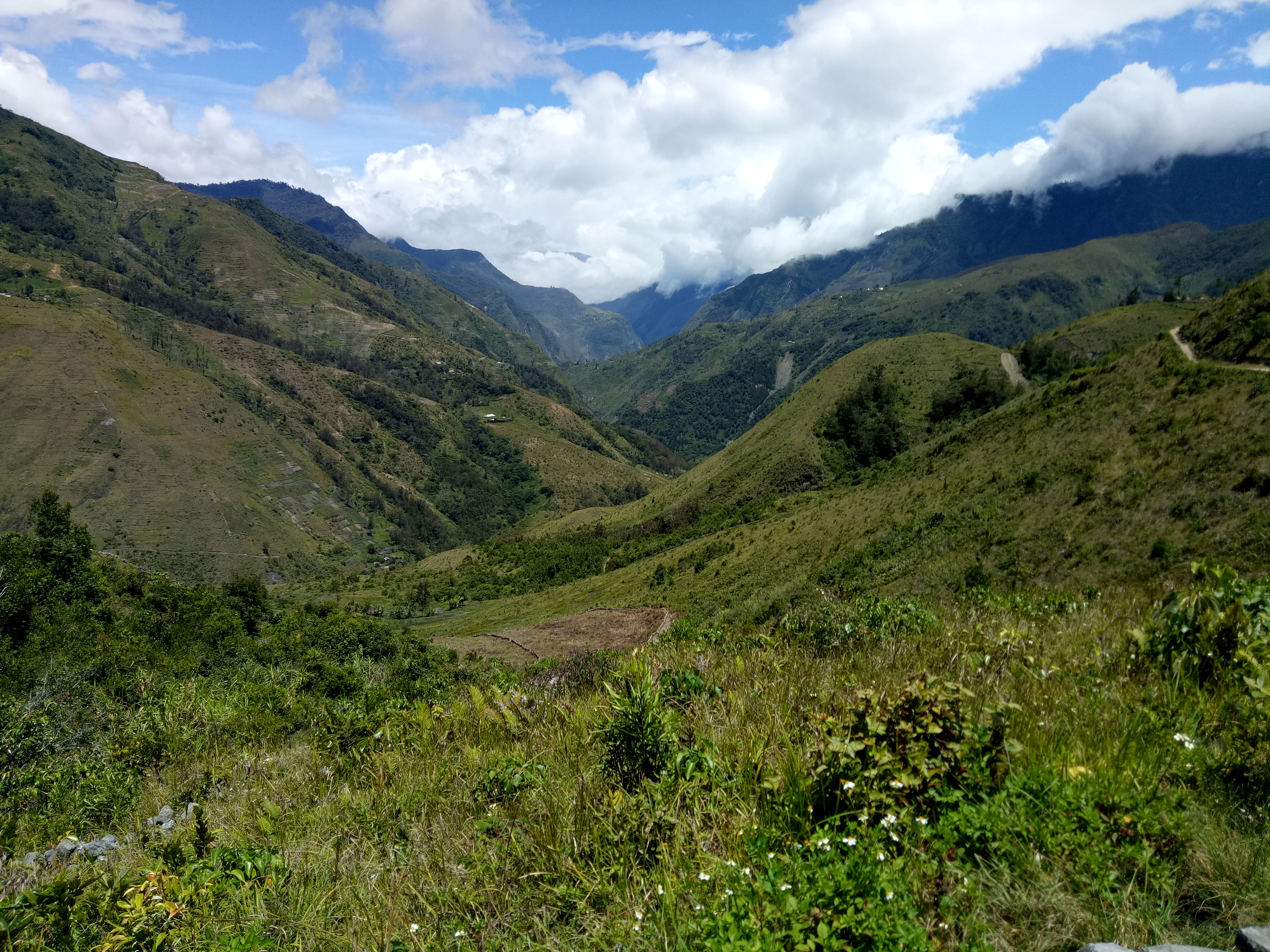
Baliem Valley

Apart from the cultivated valleys, the montane forests are largely intact, although the logging industry is a constant threat as more and more access to the mountains is achieved by road building. 20% of this ecoregion is contained within protected areas, mostly in the Indonesian half of the island, including the largest protected area in Southeast Asia, the huge Lorentz National Park in the highlands, a section of which is a montane forest ecosystem.

=== Central Range sub-alpine grasslands ===
Above 3,000 metres elevation, the high mountain forest transitions to remote sub-alpine habitats including alpine meadows, conifer forest, tree-fern (Cyathea) grasslands, bogs, and shrubby heaths of Rhododendron, Vaccinium, Coprosma, Rapanea, and Saurauia all quite different from the tropical rain forest that covers most of New Guinea.

The alpine habitat above 4,000 metres consists of compact rosette plants and cushion herbs, such as Ranunculus, Potentilla, Gentiana, and Epilobium, grasses (Poa and Deschampsia), bryophytes, and lichens.

While there are several endemic plants there are few animals on the higher slopes, with only nine mammals found here: four rodents, two bats, a cuscus possum, an antechinus, and Doria's tree-kangaroo (Dendrolagus dorianus). Four of these are endemic: the small marsupial black-tailed antechinus (Murexechinus melanurus), western shrew mouse, glacier rat, and alpine woolly rat. There are nearly 100 birds of which 28 are considered endemic or nearly so, including the vulnerable long-bearded honeyeater (Melionyx princeps), ribbon-tailed astrapia (Astrapia mayeri), and Macgregor's giant honeyeater, which although endangered generally is a cultural icon of the Ketengban people of the Star Mountains and therefore protected in some areas.

Almost half of these remote grasslands are protected in national parks and they are in good condition although in recent times more people are accessing the highlands as visitors or through involvement in mining.

== Protected areas ==
There are several protected areas in the highlands. They include:

- Enarotali Nature Reserve
- Jimi (Ruti) Valley National Park
- Lake Kutubu Wildlife Management Area
- Lorentz National Park
- Memberamo Foja Wildlife Reserve
- Mount Wilhelm National Park
- Weyland Mountains (Pegunungan Wayland) Nature Reserve

== See also ==
- List of highest mountains of New Guinea
- Highlands Highway
