= List of highest mountains of New Guinea =

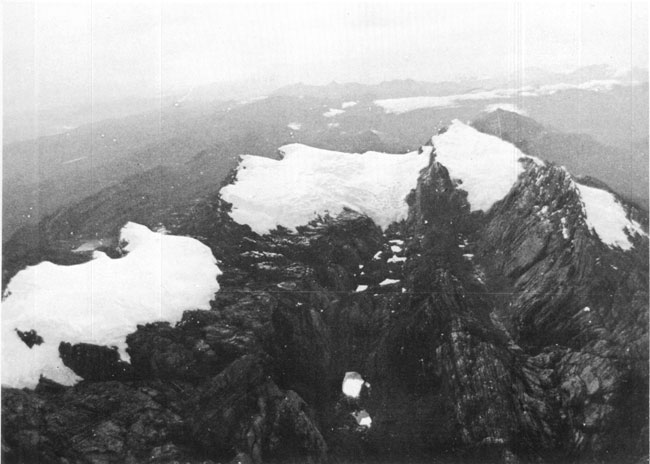
Mount Carstensz from the east in 1972. Left to right: North Wall Peaks, Ngga Pulu, Carstensz East, and Puncak Jaya or Carstensz Pyramid. Due to glacier melt, the rocky ridge of Jaya has surpassed Ngga Pulu as the highest summit of Oceania.

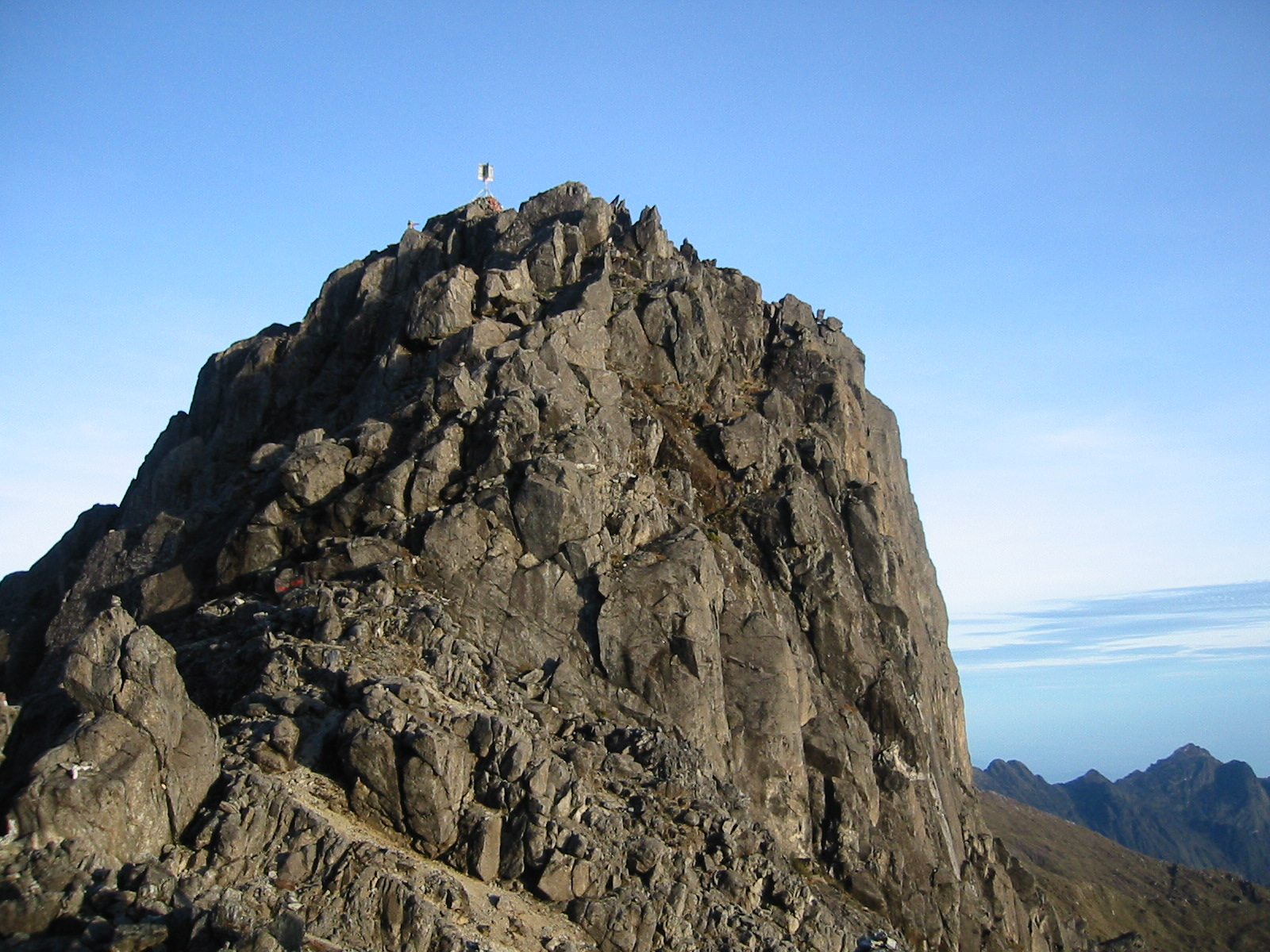
Mount Wilhelm, highest peak of Papua New Guinea

This list of highest mountains of New Guinea shows all mountains on the island of New Guinea that are at least 3,750 m (12,300 ft) high and have a topographic prominence of 500 m (1,600 ft) or more. These c. 50 peaks are also the highest mountains of Australasia and the continent of Australia, where, outside New Guinea, the highest mountain is Aoraki / Mount Cook in New Zealand with a height of 3,724 m (12,218 ft). A list of highest mountains of Oceania with the same limitations is almost identical, with the addition of the Hawaiian volcanoes of Mauna Kea (4,205 m; 13,796 ft) and Mauna Loa (4,169 m; 13,678 ft) in 18th and 20th positions. The list also shows the 36 highest thus defined mountains of Indonesia, except for the 3,805-metre-high (12,484 ft) Gunung Kerinci on Sumatra (#29 in Indonesia), and the 16 highest mountains of Papua New Guinea.

== Limited topographical data ==
Many mountains in New Guinea are poorly surveyed, and some major summits remain unnamed on maps. Even well-measured mountains have conflicting heights on otherwise-authoritative maps. For example, the highest point in Oceania, Carstensz Pyramid, was established to be 4,884 m (16,024 ft) in 1973 when an Australian survey expedition put a beacon on the summit. This corresponded closely to the 4,866 m (15,965 ft) estimated by the first Lorentsz Expedition in 1910 using repeated theodolite observations from the south coast. However, over time the mountain had grown in stature: measurements from northern observation peaks for the highest summit (each time Ngga Pulu) were 5,000 m (16,404 ft) in 1910 by Ludolph Doorman and 5,030 m (16,503 ft) in 1926 by Charles C.F.M. Le Roux. The 1936 Carstensz Expedition using barometric and boiling point measurements on the summit of Ngga Pulu also derived an elevation of 5,030 m (16,503 ft). After ascending the Pyramid in 1962, Heinrich Harrer even estimated that peak to be 17,096 feet (5,211 m) high. The 1973 survey established that the 1936 barometric estimates were consistently 118–127 m (387–417 ft) too high. Nevertheless, the 5,030 m (16,503 ft) height is still prevalent in most atlases and maps.

== Disappearing and disappeared glaciers of the Snowy Mountains ==
All mountains in West Papua are in the Maoke Mountains, a translation of the name “Sneeuwgebergte” or Snowy Mountains endowed to them in 1623 by Jan Carstensz, at which time many of the peaks indeed were covered by extensive ice caps. By the beginning of the 20th century, at least five such glaciated regions remained on the highest mountains. In 1913, the 4,520–4,550 m (14,830–14,930 ft) Prins-Hendrik-top (now Puncak Yamin) was named and reported to have some "eternal" snow. The ice cap of Wilhelmina Peaks vanished between 1939 and 1963, while the Mandala / Juliana ice cap disappeared in the 1990s. The Idenburg glacier on Ngga Pilimsit dried up in 2003, leaving currently only the remnants of the glaciers on Mount Carstensz, the last of which are expected to disappear before 2025 and perhaps much earlier. The snow melt on the last mountain has caused a change of the highest summit of New Guinea: somewhere between 1936 and 1973 the title of highest summit of Oceania changed from Ngga Pulu, the highest point of the Northwall Firn (by then split into the West and East Northwall Firn; only small patches of the latter still exist), to the rocky spires of Carstensz Pyramid 3 km (1.9 mi) to its south-west.

== The list ==
The list contains some unranked summits that are either of general interest, may show topographic prominences of > 500 m (1,600 ft) given better data, or are more than 12 km (7.5 mi) isolated from any higher point.

Rank	Mountain	Height		Range	Country (rank)	Coordinates	Prominence		Isolation		First ascent
Rank	Mountain	m	ft	Range	Country (rank)	Coordinates	m	ft	km	mi	First ascent
1	Puncak Jaya / Carstensz Pyramid	4,884	16,024	Western Sudirman/Nassau	Indonesia (1)	04°04′43″S 137°09′30″E	4,884	16,024	5,261	3,269	13 Feb 1962
	Sumantri / Ngga Pulu NW	4,870	15,980	Western Sudirman/Nassau	Indonesia	04°03′43″S 137°11′06″E	350	1,150	3.5	2.2	Feb 1962
	Ngga Pulu	4,862	15,951	Western Sudirman/Nassau	Indonesia	04°03′59″S 137°11′16″E	100	330	0.6	0.37	5 Dec 1936
	Carstensz East	4,820	15,810	Western Sudirman/Nassau	Indonesia	04°05′00″S 137°11′06″E	280	920	1.9	1.2	5 Dec 1936
2	Mandala / Juliana Pk / Abom	4,760	15,620	Jayawijaya / Orange	Indonesia (2)	04°42′31″S 140°17′22″E	2,760	9,060	351	1,152.4	9 Sep 1959
3	Trikora / Wilhelmina Pk	4,730	15,520	Eastern Sudirman / Nassau	Indonesia (3)	04°15′44″S 138°40′54″E	1,262	4,140	167	548.0	21 Feb 1913
4	Ngga Pilimsit / Idenburg Pk	4,717	15,476	Western Sudirman/Nassau	Indonesia (4)	04°02′08″S 137°03′33″E	557	1,827	11.1	6.9	21 Feb 1962
5	Yamin / Prins Hendrik Pk	4,540	14,900	Jayawijaya / Orange	Indonesia (5)	04°40′59″S 140°04′52″E	700	2,300	20.0	12.4	
6	Cornelis Speelman Mts	4,540	14,900	Jayawijaya / Orange	Indonesia (6)	04°34′28″S 140°08′14″E	700	2,300	18.2	11.3	
7	Mt Wilhelm / Enduwa Kombuglu	4,509	14,793	Bismarck Range	Papua New Guinea (1)	05°46′48″S 145°01′46″E	2,969	9,741	537	1,762.7	15 Aug 1938
8	J P Coen Pk	4,500	14,800	Jayawijaya / Orange	Indonesia (7)	04°18′16″S 139°37′53″E	820	2,690	63.5	39.5	
9	Pt 4460	4,460	14,630	Western Sudirman/Nassau	Indonesia (8)	04°05′04″S 137°20′59″E	600	2,000	17.2	10.7	
10	Valentijn Pks	4,453	14,610	Jayawijaya / Orange	Indonesia (9)	04°25′12″S 139°44′08″E	640	2,100	17.1	10.6	
	Dom / Platen Spitz	4,420	14,500	Western Sudirman/Nassau	Indonesia	04°05′29″S 137°08′02″E	460	1,510	2.1	1.3	
	Akimuga / Prince Willem I Pk	4,390	14,400	Western Sudirman/Nassau	Indonesia	04°06′47″S 137°27′56″E	340	1,120	12.3	7.6	
11	Zaagtoppen (Saw Mtns)	4,380	14,370	Jayawijaya / Orange	Indonesia (10)	04°33′01″S 139°55′06″E	680	2,230	19.1	11.9	
12	Mt Giluwe	4,367	14,327	New Guinea Highlands	Papua New Guinea (2)	06°02′36″S 143°53′11″E	2,507	8,225	129	423.5	16 Jun 1934
13	Willem II Pk	4,360	14,300	Eastern Sudirman/Nassau	Indonesia (11)	04°09′43″S 138°20′24″E	620	2,030	36.9	22.9	
14	Ubia / Mt Leonard Darwin	4,340	14,240	Western Sudirman/Nassau	Indonesia (12)	04°00′22″S 136°48′09″E	580	1,900	20.3	12.6	
	Doema ?	4,340	14,240	Western Sudirman/Nassau	Indonesia	03°57′53″S 136°52′42″E	340	1,120	12.2	7.6	
15	Willem I Pk	4,320	14,170	Eastern Sudirman/Nassau	Indonesia (13)	04°08′26″S 138°15′44″E	660	2,170	8.9	5.5	
16	Rumphius Pk	4,320	14,170	Eastern Sudirman/Nassau	Indonesia (14)	04°17′44″S 138°48′34″E	540	1,770	13.0	8.1	
17	Pt 4260	4,300	14,100	Jayawijaya / Orange	Indonesia (15)	04°38′10″S 140°17′27″E	540	1,770	5.4	3.4	
	Pt 4240	4,240	13,910	Eastern Sudirman/Nassau	Indonesia	04°09′29″S 138°26′50″E	400	1,300	11.6	7.2	
18	Prince Willem II Pk	4,220	13,850	Eastern Sudirman/Nassau	Indonesia (16)	04°09′01″S 137°56′57″E	540	1,770	30.7	19.1	
19	Pt 4180	4,180	13,710	Western Sudirman/Nassau	Indonesia (17)	04°00′36″S 136°51′30″E	600	2,000	5.1	3.2	
20	Mt Boising / Gladstone	4,155	13,632	Finisterre Range	Papua New Guinea (3)	05°57′14″S 146°22′31″E	3,710	12,170	148	486.4	25 June 2014
21	Mt Sarawaget / Bangeta	4,121	13,520	Saruwaged Range	Papua New Guinea (4)	06°18′38″S 147°05′25″E	1,701	5,581	88.4	54.9	1912
22	Mt Kabangama	4,104	13,465	Kubor Range	Papua New Guinea (5)	06°03′38″S 144°36′56″E	2,284	7,493	52.4	32.6	
23	Pt 4100	4,100	13,500	Maoke Range	Indonesia (18)	03°57′26″S 137°44′57″E	510	1,670	25.8	16.0	
24	Ngga Nggulumbulu	4,061	13,323	Nggulumbulu / Hens Range	Indonesia (19)	03°45′30″S 137°18′40″E	1,300	4,300	32.5	20.2	
	Mt Kotewon ?	4,060	13,320	Saruwaged Range	Papua New Guinea	06°14′09″S 146°57′37″E	460	1,510	16.2	10.1	
	Pt 4040	4,040	13,250	Saruwaged Range	Papua New Guinea	06°14′13″S 146°54′26″E	460	1,510	5.9	3.7	
	Prins Maurits Mtns	4,040	13,250	Western Sudirman/Nassau	Indonesia	04°06′08″S 137°39′10″E	380	1,250	16.4	10.2	
25	Mt Victoria	4,038	13,248	Owen Stanley Range	Papua New Guinea (6)	08°53′34″S 147°31′59″E	2,738	8,983	287	942.8	11 Jun 1889
	Frederik Hendrik Pk	4,020	13,190	Western Sudirman/Nassau	Indonesia	04°05′29″S 137°46′02″E	280	920	12.8	8.0	
26	Johan Willem Friso Pk	4,000	13,000	Eastern Sudirman/Nassau	Indonesia (20)	04°10′12″S 138°01′33″E	560	1,840	2.9	1.8	
27	Mt Albert Edward	3,993	13,100	Owen Stanley Range	Papua New Guinea (7)	08°24′44″S 147°24′12″E	980	3,220	54.8	34.1	1906
28	Antares	3,970	13,020	Star Mountains	Indonesia (21)	04°53′46″S 140°54′15″E	1,360	4,460	63.7	39.6	6 Jul 1959
29	Mt Kubor	3,969	13,022	Kubor Range	Papua New Guinea (8)	06°06′06″S 144°45′36″E	580	1,900	16.3	10.1	
30	Mt Elit	3,960	12,990	Jayawijaya / Orange	Indonesia (22)	03°59′34″S 139°11′09″E	720	2,360	36.8	22.9	
31	Capella	3,960	12,990	Star Mountains	Papua New Guinea (9)	04°59′45″S 141°04′57″E	670	2,200	22.6	14.0	Apr or May 1965
32	Pt 3960	3,960	12,990	Jayawijaya / Orange	Indonesia (23)	04°19′34″S 139°26′26″E	660	2,170	12.3	7.6	
33	Angemuk	3,949	12,956	Maoke Mountains	Indonesia (24)	03°31′30″S 138°35′31″E	1,565	5,135	70.6	43.9	
34	Pt 3940	3,940	12,930	Maoke Mountains	Indonesia (25)	03°51′12″S 137°57′52″E	800	2,600	24.4	15.2	
35	Bondewit?/Yupnakabap?	3,920	12,860	Finisterre Range	Papua New Guinea (10)	06°00′15″S 146°29′56″E	820	2,690	9.3	5.8	Jan or Feb 1965
36	Tiom Mtns HP	3,915	12,844	Tiom Mountains	Indonesia (26)	03°46′01″S 138°16′01″E	720	2,360	34.9	21.7	
37	Pt 3900	3,900	12,800	Jayawijaya / Orange	Indonesia (27)	04°16′35″S 139°18′58″E	640	2,100	14.2	8.8	
38	Mt Kegeraga	3,885	12,746	Kubor Range	Papua New Guinea (11)	06°01′48″S 144°23′23″E	720	2,360	24.6	15.3	
39	Pt 3860_Finisterre	3,860	12,660	Finisterre Range	Papua New Guinea (12)	05°47′38″S 146°06′33″E	660	2,170	30.9	19.2	
	Pt 3860_Orange	3,860	12,660	Jayawijaya / Orange	Indonesia	04°09′31″S 139°13′03″E	300	980	14.5	9.0	
40	Papua Peak 3856	3,856	12,651	Maoke Mountains	Indonesia (28)	03°35′10″S 138°15′35″E	1,165	3,822	19.9	12.4	
41	Mt Kumbepara	3,852	12,638	New Guinea Highlands	Papua New Guinea (13)	05°30′26″S 143°02′52″E	1,100	3,600	106	348.1	
	Pt 12467	3,840	12,600	Jayawijaya / Orange	Indonesia	04°42′34″S 140°28′08″E	480	1,570	11.2	7.0	
42	Pt 3820	3,820	12,530	Maoke Mountains	Indonesia (29)	03°55′02″S 138°02′16″E	560	1,840	8.2	5.1	
	Mt Scratchley	3,820	12,530	Owen Stanley Range	Papua New Guinea	08°44′14″S 147°28′35″E	480	1,570	16.4	10.2	23 Oct 1897
	Pt 3820	3,820	12,530	Maoke Mountains	Indonesia	03°50′00″S 138°24′45″E	440	1,440	14.7	9.1	
43	X-chain HP	3,801	12,470	Maoke Mountains (X-chain)	Indonesia (31)	03°32′32″S 137°49′42″E	1,120	3,670	35.5	22.1	
44	Pt 3800	3,800	12,500	Maoke Mountains	Indonesia (32)	03°34′39″S 138°02′46″E	600	2,000	23.4	14.5	
45	Mt Kaijende	3,798	12,461	New Guinea Highlands	Papua New Guinea (15)	05°28′25″S 143°11′50″E	620	2,030	15.1	9.4	
46	Jumbul Ambera	3,785	12,418	Maoke Mountains	Indonesia (33)	03°52′03″S 139°00′13″E	1,383	4,537	18.5	11.5	
47	Mt Hagen	3,778	12,395	New Guinea Highlands	Papua New Guinea (14)	05°44′38″S 144°02′34″E	1,080	3,540	29.3	18.2	July 1933
48	Z-chain high-point	3,774	12,382	Maoke Mountains (Z-chain)	Indonesia (34)	03°37′59″S 136°55′24″E	1,354	4,442	35.2	21.9	
49	Mt Undan / Udon / Bedego	3,774	12,382	Bismarck Range	Papua New Guinea (16)	05°48′02″S 144°51′12″E	800	2,600	13.2	8.2	
50	Pt 3760	3,760	12,340	Jayawijaya / Orange	Indonesia (35)	04°41′33″S 140°30′32″E	560	1,840	4.5	2.8	
51	Kobowre HP/ Wakai	3,750	12,300	Kobowre / Weyland Mts	Indonesia (36)	03°52′15″S 135°52′14″E	2,217	7,274	88.4	54.9	
52	Wachter (Guardian)	3,750	12,300	Jayawijaya / Orange	Indonesia (37)	04°27′30″S 139°27′48″E	880	2,890	11.1	6.9	
