= Papuan Peninsula =

Peninsula in Papua New Guinea

Papuan Peninsula Bird's Tail Peninsula
- Peninsula
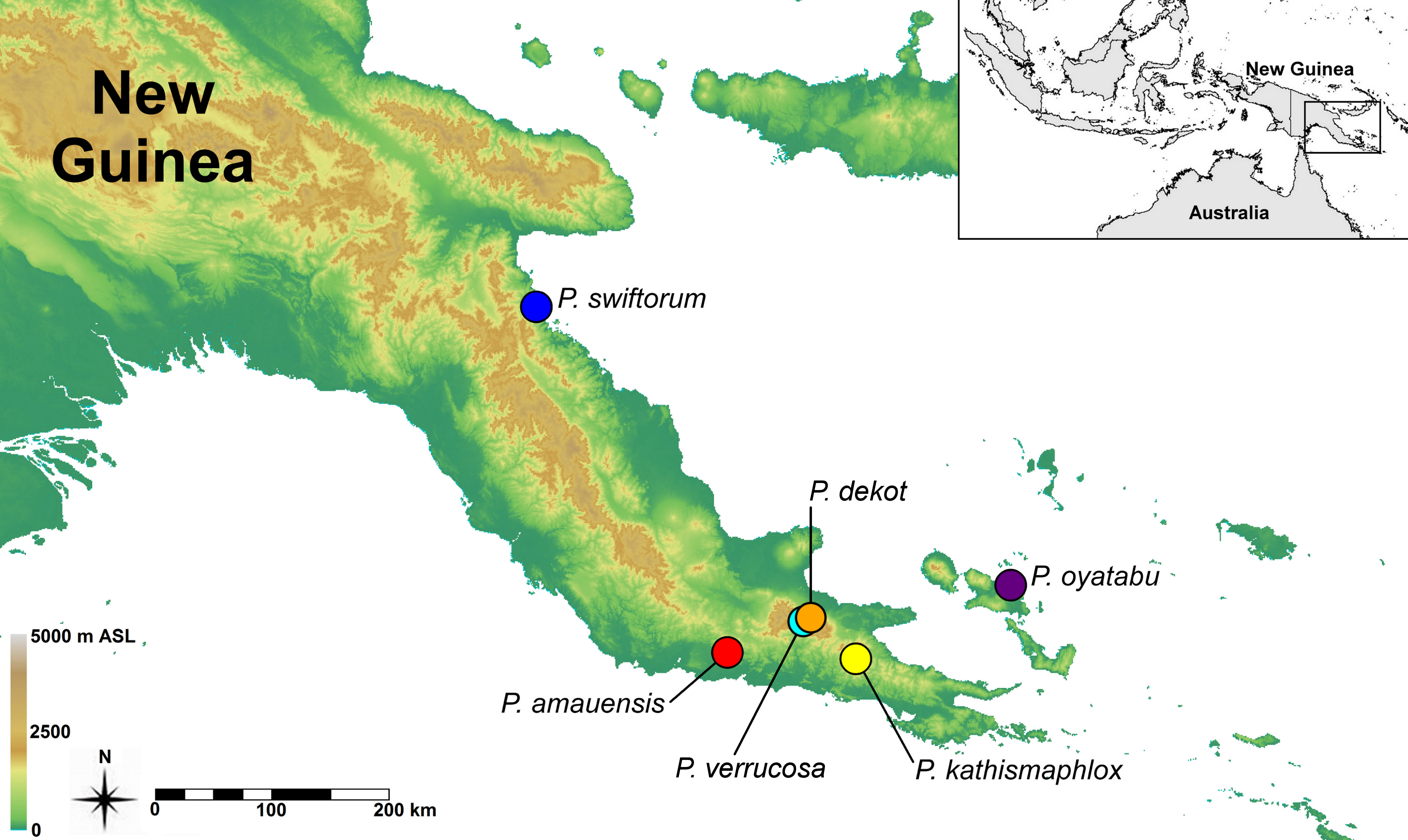

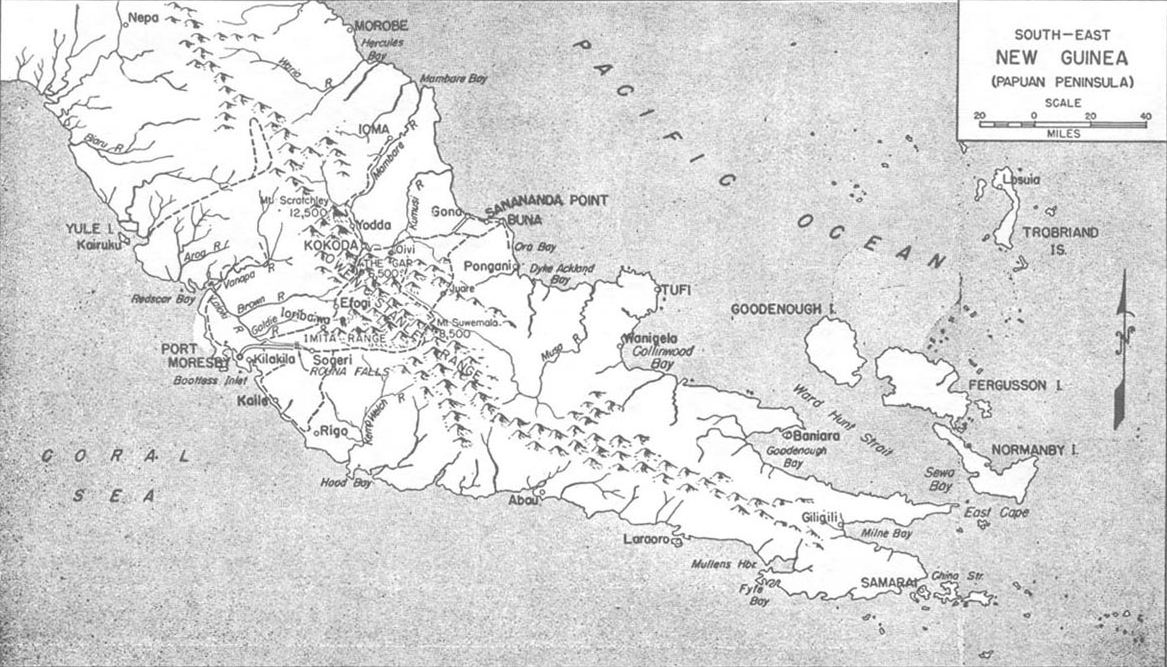
- Coordinates: 8°50′S 147°30′E
- Location: Papua New Guinea
- Highest elevation: 4,038 m (13,248 ft) (Mount Victoria)
- Provinces: Milne Bay Province, Oro Province, Central Province, National Capital District; parts of Morobe Province and Gulf Province
- Cities: Port Moresby, Popondetta, Alotau

The Papuan Peninsula, also known as the Bird's Tail Peninsula, is a large peninsula in Papua New Guinea, southeast of the city of Lae, that makes up the southeastern portion of the island of New Guinea. The peninsula is the easternmost extent of the New Guinea Highlands and consists largely of the Owen Stanley Range, with peaks such as Mount Victoria (4,038 m) and Mount Suckling (3,676 m). On the south coast is Port Moresby, the capital and largest city of Papua New Guinea.

The island of New Guinea is often visualized as being in the shape of a bird, with the Bird's Head Peninsula being at the northwest end of the island, and the Bird's Tail Peninsula at the southeast end. For example, American soldiers in WWII visualized it specifically as a turkey, and referenced the anatomy of the bird as a shorthand for explaining where various actions and deployments occurred on the island.

The island has also been visualised as a lizard.

== See also ==
- Southeast Papuan languages
- Southeastern Papuan rain forests
