= Anisotenes stemmatostola =

Scientific classification
- Kingdom: Animalia
- Phylum: Arthropoda
- Clade: Pancrustacea
- Class: Insecta
- Order: Lepidoptera
- Family: Tortricidae
- Genus: Anisotenes
- Species: A. stemmatostola

Binomial name
- Anisotenes stemmatostola Diakonoff, 1952

Species of moth

Anisotenes stemmatostola is a species of moth of the family Tortricidae. It is found in New Guinea, in the Maoke Mountains (Western New Guinea).

The wingspan length is 23 mm (0.91 in) in males and 26 mm (1.0 in) in females.
