= Orange Mountains =

Orange Mountains may refer to the following mountain ranges:

- Jayawijaya Mountains, in Indonesia
- Watchung Mountains, in New Jersey, United States
