= Hugo Zöller =

German explorer and journalist

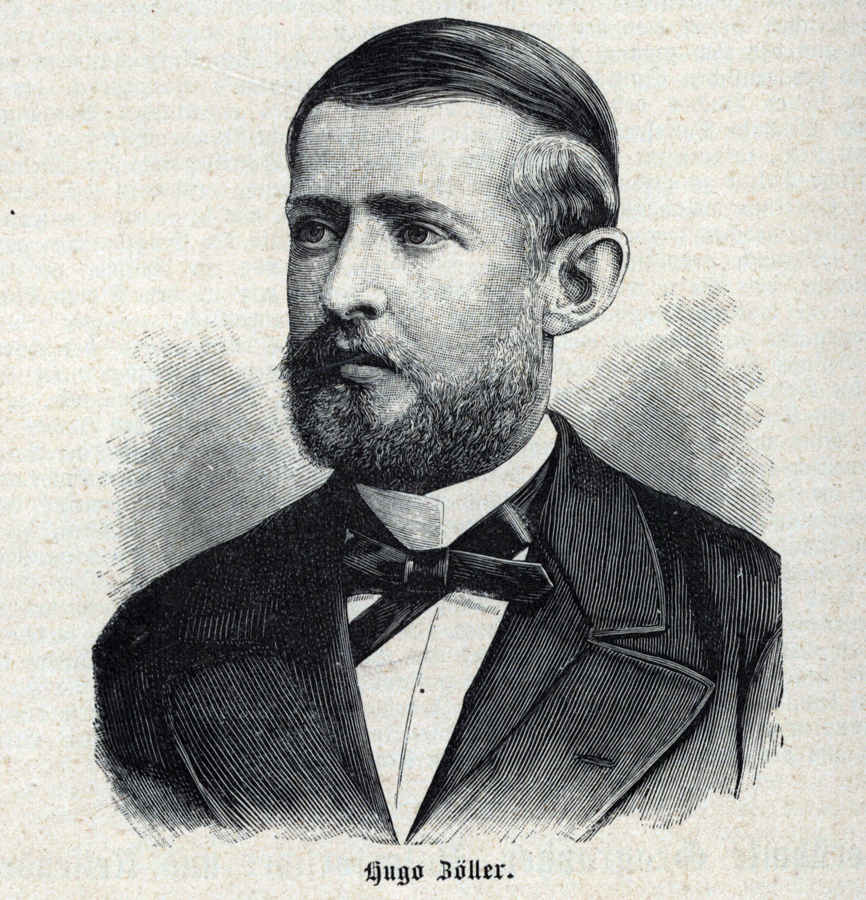
Zöller in 1891

Hugo Zöller (12 January 1852 – 1933) was a German explorer and journalist. His brother Egon Zöller was an author and friend of Karl Pearson.

Hugo was born near Schleiden, Kingdom of Prussia. He studied law and in 1872 to 1874 travelled to countries in the Mediterranean Sea region. In 1874 he became a journalist for Kölnische Zeitung.

In 1879 Zöller started his travels around the world. The result was a two-volume book Rund um die Erde (Köln 1881). In 1881 and 1882 he travelled across South America and then published Die Deutschen im brasilianischen Urwald (Stuttgart 1883) and Pampas und Anden (Stuttgart 1884).

By the end of 1882 he worked as a war correspondent in Egypt during the British campaign there. In 1883 he was ordered to explore territories in Western Africa previously explored by Gustav Nachtigal. First he travelled across the Togoland, then he went to Cameroon where he in 1884 made a successful ascent of Mount Cameroon together with Stefan Szolc-Rogoziński.

While in Cameroon he discovered the Batanga River but soon after this he fell ill and returned to Germany.

In 1888 he travelled to German New Guinea and became the first European to penetrate into inner New Guinea and climb the peaks of Finisterre Range. During this he also discovered Mount Wilhelm in the Bismarck Range. He died in Munich.
