= Ngga Pilimsit =

- Idenburg Top
- Location within Central Papua Location within Indonesia

Highest point
- Elevation: 4,717 m (15,476 ft)
- Prominence: 557 m (1,827 ft)
- Coordinates: 4°02′08″S 137°03′33″E

Geography
- Location: Central Papua, Indonesia
- Parent range: Western Sudirman/Nassau

Climbing
- First ascent: 21 February 1962 by Heinrich Harrer and Philip Temple

Ngga Pilimsit (or Mount Idenburg, its colonial name) is a mountain located in the Indonesian province of Central Papua, in the Maoke Mountains. It rises 4,717 meters (15,476 ft). It is a little over thirteen miles west-northwest of Puncak Jaya, the highest peak of Oceania and Indonesia. The nearest peaks are Carstensz Pyramid (Puncak Jaya), Wataikwa, Ubia, Venusberg, and Otakwa. Dependent on the definition used for an independent mountain, the peak ranks as the fourth to seventh highest mountain on New Guinea and in Indonesia.

== Glaciers ==
Ngga Pilimsit used to have a small cirque glacier a few hundred meters in diameter on its eastern slope. The glacier was last seen in 1988, with it satellite imagery showing it to have completely disappeared by 1991. However, the glacier was only confirmed to have disappeared in 2003.

== See also ==
- List of highest mountains of New Guinea
- List of Southeast Asian mountains
