= Anisotenes pyrra =

Scientific classification
- Kingdom: Animalia
- Phylum: Arthropoda
- Clade: Pancrustacea
- Class: Insecta
- Order: Lepidoptera
- Family: Tortricidae
- Genus: Anisotenes
- Species: A. pyrra

Binomial name
- Anisotenes pyrra Diakonoff, 1952

Species of moth

Anisotenes pyrra is a species of moth of the family Tortricidae. It is found in New Guinea, in the Maoke Mountains (Western New Guinea).

The wingspan length is 22–26 mm (0.87–1.02 in) for females.
