= Anisotenes =

Scientific classification
- Domain: Eukaryota
- Kingdom: Animalia
- Phylum: Arthropoda
- Class: Insecta
- Order: Lepidoptera
- Family: Tortricidae
- Tribe: Archipini
- Genus: Anisotenes; Diakonoff, 1952

Genus of tortrix moths

Anisotenes is a genus of moths belonging to the subfamily Tortricinae of the family Tortricidae.

== Species ==
- Anisotenes acrodasys Diakonoff, 1952
- Anisotenes amphiloga Diakonoff, 1952
- Anisotenes axigera (Diakonoff, 1941)
- Anisotenes basalis (Diakonoff, 1941)
- Anisotenes bathygrapha Diakonoff, 1952
- Anisotenes cacotechna Diakonoff, 1952
- Anisotenes decora Diakonoff, 1952
- Anisotenes dracontodonta Diakonoff, 1952
- Anisotenes ellipegrapha Diakonoff, 1952
- Anisotenes fallax Diakonoff, 1952
- Anisotenes leucophthalma Diakonoff, 1952
- Anisotenes libidinosa Diakonoff, 1952
- Anisotenes oxygrapta Diakonoff, 1952
- Anisotenes phanerogonia Diakonoff, 1952
- Anisotenes pyrra Diakonoff, 1952
- Anisotenes schizolitha Diakonoff, 1952
- Anisotenes scoliographa Diakonoff, 1952
- Anisotenes spodotes Diakonoff, 1952
- Anisotenes stemmatostola Diakonoff, 1952
- Anisotenes uniformis (Diakonoff, 1941)

== See also ==
- List of Tortricidae genera
