= Anisotenes dracontodonta =

Scientific classification
- Kingdom: Animalia
- Phylum: Arthropoda
- Class: Insecta
- Order: Lepidoptera
- Family: Tortricidae
- Genus: Anisotenes
- Species: A. dracontodonta

Binomial name
- Anisotenes dracontodonta Diakonoff, 1952

Species of moth

Anisotenes dracontodonta is a species of moth of the family Tortricidae. It is found in New Guinea.
