= Mount Kubor =

Mountain in Chimbu Province, Papua New Guinea

Mount Kubor /King Kaing Ku / Minjmillen Ku Kik
- Location within Papua New Guinea

Highest point
- Elevation: 4,359 m (14,301 ft)
- Coordinates: 6°06′S 144°45′E

Geography
- Location: Jiwaka Province, Papua New Guinea
- Parent range: Owen Stanley ranges

Mount Kubor (also known as Mount Leahy in honor of Mick Leahy (explorer) ) is a peak in the Kubor Range in the New Guinea Highlands, in the Jiwaka Province of Papua New Guinea.

== History ==
Mount Kubor was named in 1933 by a member of the first Western expedition group to survey the area.
