= Anisotenes uniformis =

Scientific classification
- Domain: Eukaryota
- Kingdom: Animalia
- Phylum: Arthropoda
- Class: Insecta
- Order: Lepidoptera
- Family: Tortricidae
- Genus: Anisotenes
- Species: A. uniformis

Binomial name
- Anisotenes uniformis (Diakonoff, 1941)

Synonyms
- Syndemis uniformis Diakonoff, 1941

Species of moth

Anisotenes uniformis is a species of moth of the family Tortricidae. It is found on Java in Indonesia.
