= Anisotenes decora =

Scientific classification
- Domain: Eukaryota
- Kingdom: Animalia
- Phylum: Arthropoda
- Class: Insecta
- Order: Lepidoptera
- Family: Tortricidae
- Genus: Anisotenes
- Species: A. decora

Binomial name
- Anisotenes decora Diakonoff, 1952

Species of moth

Anisotenes decora is a species of moth of the family Tortricidae. It is found in New Guinea.
