= Anisotenes axigera =

Scientific classification
- Domain: Eukaryota
- Kingdom: Animalia
- Phylum: Arthropoda
- Class: Insecta
- Order: Lepidoptera
- Family: Tortricidae
- Genus: Anisotenes
- Species: A. axigera

Binomial name
- Anisotenes axigera (Diakonoff, 1941)

Synonyms
- Syndemis axigera Diakonoff, 1941; Syndemis axigera talina Diakonoff, 1941

Species of moth

Anisotenes axigera is a species of moth of the family Tortricidae. It is found on Sumatra and Java.

== Subspecies ==
- Anisotenes axigera axigera (Sumatra)
- Anisotenes axigera talina (Diakonoff, 1941) (Java)
