= Phangran Razi =

Mountain in Myanmar

- ဖန်ဂရန်ရာဇီ
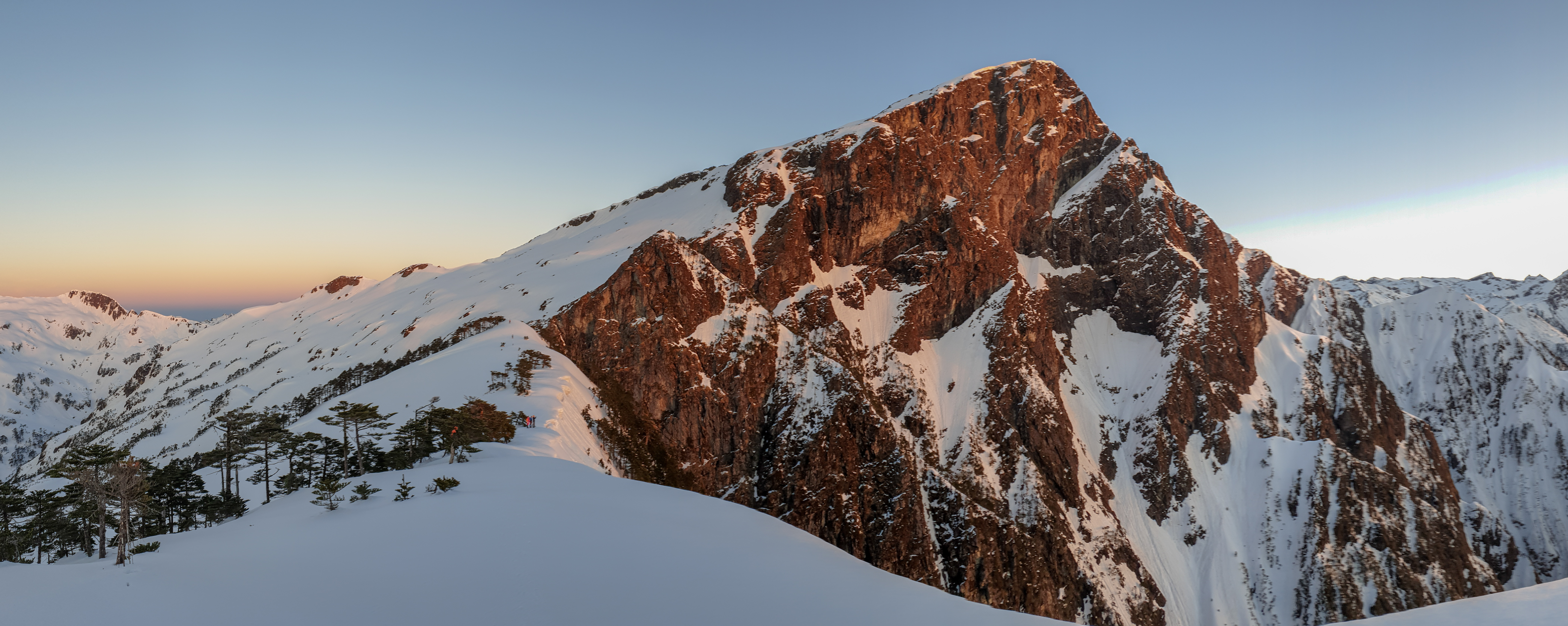

Highest point
- Elevation: 4,328 m (14,199 ft)
- Listing: List of Southeast Asian mountains
- Coordinates: 27°37′19″N 96°54′50″E

Geography
- Location within Myanmar
- Location: Kachin State, Burma

Climbing
- First ascent: unknown
- Easiest route: climb

Phangran Razi (Burmese: ဖန်ဂရန် ရာဇီ) is one of Burma's highest mountains, and with its height of 4,328 m (14,199 ft) and one of the highest mountains in South East Asia. It is located in the northern Myanmar state of Kachin in an outlying subrange of the Greater Himalayan mountain system near the border with India.

== See also ==
- List of mountains in Burma
