= Leigh Vial =

Australian explorer

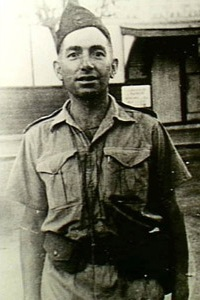
- Flight Lieutenant Leigh Vial in 1942
- Born: 28 February 1909; Camberwell, Victoria
- Died: 30 April 1943 (aged 34); Benabena, Papua New Guinea
- Burial place: Lae War Cemetery
- Military career
- Allegiance: Australia
- Branch: Royal Australian Air Force
- Service years: 1942–1943
- Rank: Flight Lieutenant
- Service number: 253939
- Unit: Coastwatchers
- Conflicts: Second World War; New Guinea campaign
- Awards: Distinguished Service Cross (United States)

Leigh Grant Vial (28 February 1909 – 30 April 1943) was an Australian patrol officer and coastwatcher in Papua New Guinea during the Second World War. His calm, clear voice earned him the nickname "Man With the Golden Voice".

When war broke out with Japan in late 1941 Vial was an Assistant District Officer stationed in Rabaul.

While a patrol officer he became the first white person to climb Mount Wilhelm, the highest mountain in Papua New Guinea. Vial was killed in a plane crash in 1943, the year after he had been awarded the American Distinguished Service Cross for his "extraordinary heroism" in New Guinea. He is buried in Lae War Cemetery.
