= Anisotenes basalis =

Scientific classification
- Domain: Eukaryota
- Kingdom: Animalia
- Phylum: Arthropoda
- Class: Insecta
- Order: Lepidoptera
- Family: Tortricidae
- Genus: Anisotenes
- Species: A. basalis

Binomial name
- Anisotenes basalis (Diakonoff, 1941)

Synonyms
- Isotenes basalis Diakonoff, 1941

Species of moth

Anisotenes basalis is a species of moth of the family Tortricidae. It is found in New Guinea.
