= Jayawijaya Mountains =

Mountain range in New Guinea, Indonesia

- Pegunungan Jayawijaya
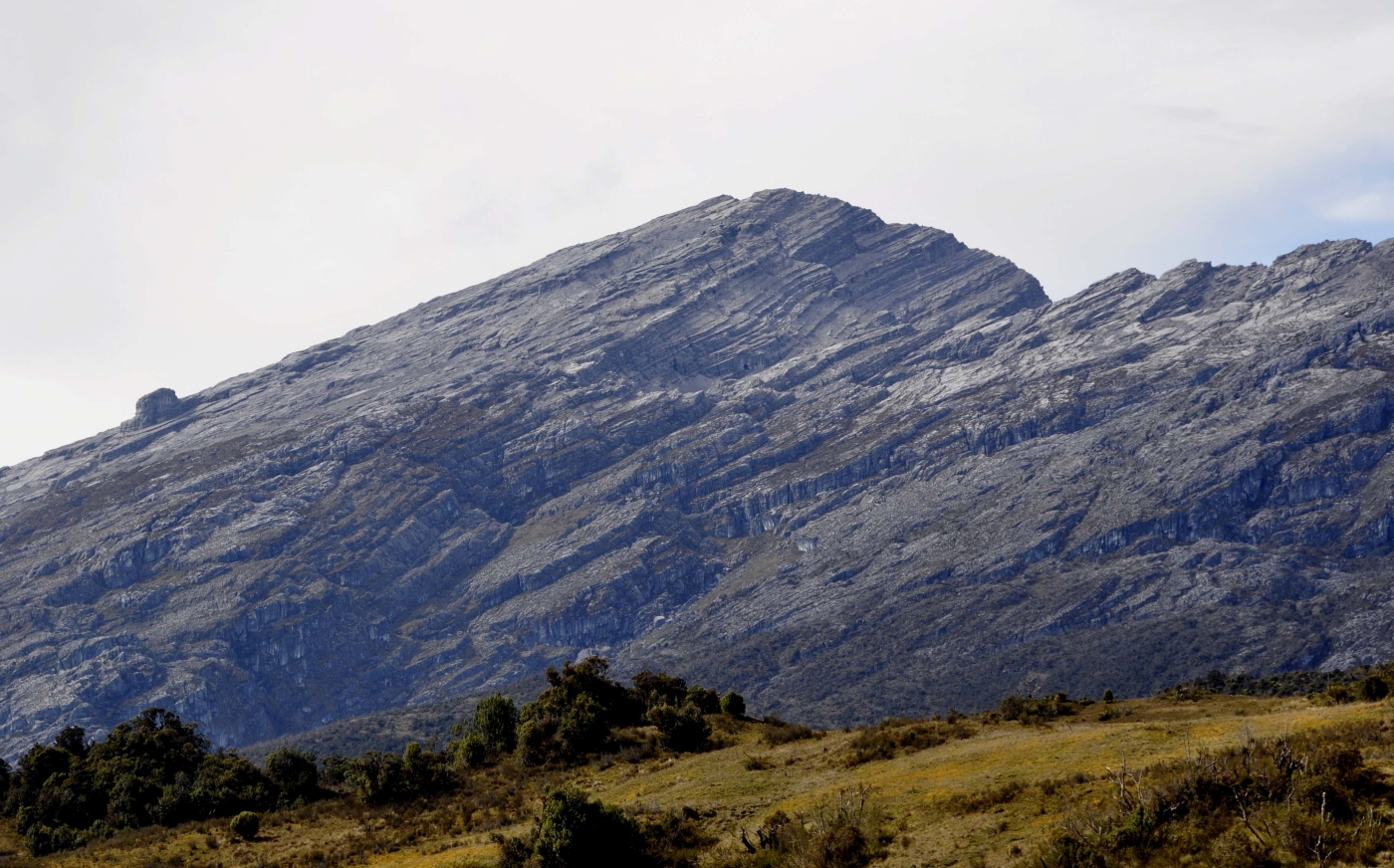
- Puncak Mandala

Highest point
- Peak: Puncak Mandala
- Elevation: 4,760 m (15,620 ft)
- Coordinates: 4°21′S 139°25′E

Dimensions
- Length: 370 kilometres (230 mi)

Geography
- Location within Western New Guinea
- Location: New Guinea
- Country: Indonesia
- Province: Highland Papua
- Parent range: New Guinea Highlands

The Jayawijaya Mountains, formerly known as the Orange Range, are the eastern mountain range of the Maoke Mountains in the central highlands region of the Indonesian part of New Guinea. The range extends for 370 kilometres (230 mi) east of the Sudirman Range to the Star Mountains. Its highest point is Puncak Mandala at 4,760 metres (15,617 ft). The Baliem River has its source in the range.

Inhabitants of the range include the Ketengban near Star Mountains.

Jayawijaya Mountains Wildlife Refuge, also known as Pegunungan Jayawijaya Wildlife Refuge, covers part of the range.

The range's Eternity Glaciers are projected to vanish by the year 2026, due both to climate change and strong El Niño weather patterns. The glaciers' depth has declined from 32 m (105 ft) in 2010 to 8 m (26 ft) in 2021.

== See also ==
- List of highest mountains of New Guinea
