= Phu Luong (mountain) =

Mountain in Vietnam

- Location within Vietnam

Highest point
- Elevation: 2,985 m (9,793 ft)
- Prominence: 1,930 m (6,330 ft)
- Listing: Ultra
- Coordinates: 21°34′15″N 104°18′24″E

Geography
- Location: Yên Bái province, Vietnam

Phu Luong is a mountain in North Vietnam. It has an elevation of 2,985 metres (9,793 ft) above sea level. With a topographic prominence of 1,930 metres (6,332 ft) it is the fourth most prominent peak in Indochina (comprising Vietnam, Laos, and Cambodia). Phu Luong is located within the Yên Bái province of Vietnam.

== See also ==
- List of Southeast Asian mountains
- List of ultras of Southeast Asia
