= Tami Razi =

Mountain in Myanmar

Coordinates: 27°02′N 98°05′E

Tami Razi (Burmese: တမီး ရာဇီ) is one of Burma's highest mountains, and with its height of 5,101 m (16,736 ft) and one of the highest mountains in South East Asia. It is located in the northern Myanmar state of Kachin in an outlying subrange of the Greater Himalayan mountain system near the border with India.
