= Mount Yamin =

Mountain in Highland Papua, Indonesia

- Puncak Yamin / Prins Hendrik-top
- Location within Highland Papua Location within Indonesia

Highest point
- Elevation: 4,540 m (14,900 ft)
- Prominence: 700 m (2,300 ft)
- Coordinates: 4°40′59″S 140°04′52″E

Geography
- Location: Highland Papua, Indonesia
- Parent range: Jayawijaya (Orange) Range

Mount Yamin (also Puncak Yamin or Prins Hendrik-top) is a peak found in Highland Papua Province in the Indonesian part of New Guinea . Rising to around 4,540 m (14,900 ft), it is the fourth highest freestanding mountain in Papua. The mountain was first climbed in 2018.

== Glaciology ==
In 1913, Mount Yamin (or Prins Hendrik-top, now Puncak Yamin) was named and reported to have some "eternal" snow. However, this "snow" has disappeared since then.

== See also ==
- List of highest mountains of New Guinea

=== Sources ===
- "Puncak Yamin" on Peakery.com
