= Owen Stanley Range =

Mountain range in Papua New Guinea

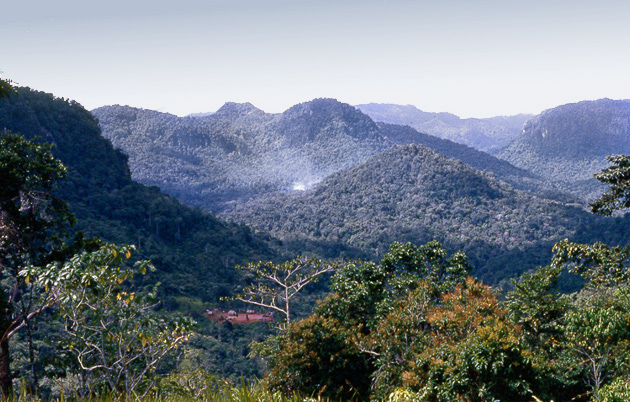
- View from Owers Corner. The Kokoda Track crosses here.

Highest point
- Peak: Mount Victoria
- Elevation: 4,038 m (13,248 ft)
- Coordinates: 8°50′S 147°30′E

Geography
- Location within Papua New Guinea
- Country: Papua New Guinea
- Provinces: Central; Northern
- Range coordinates: 9°20′S 148°00′E

The Owen Stanley Range is the south-eastern part of the central mountain-chain in Papua New Guinea. Its highest point is Mount Victoria at 4,038 metres (13,248 ft), while its most prominent peak is Mount Suckling.

== History ==
Owen Stanley Range was seen in 1849 by Captain Owen Stanley aboard HMS Rattlesnake while surveying the south coast of Papua and named after him, although he saw them only from his ship. The eastern extremity of the range is Mount Victoria, which was climbed by Sir William MacGregor in 1888, and it extends as far west as Mount Thynne and Lilley. But the name is generally used to denote the whole of the chain of the Papuan Peninsula, from Mount Chapman 3,376 metres (11,076 ft) to the south-eastern end of the island, and to include Mount Albert Edward 3,990 m (13,091 ft) which is really separated from it by the Wharton Chain.

== Geography ==
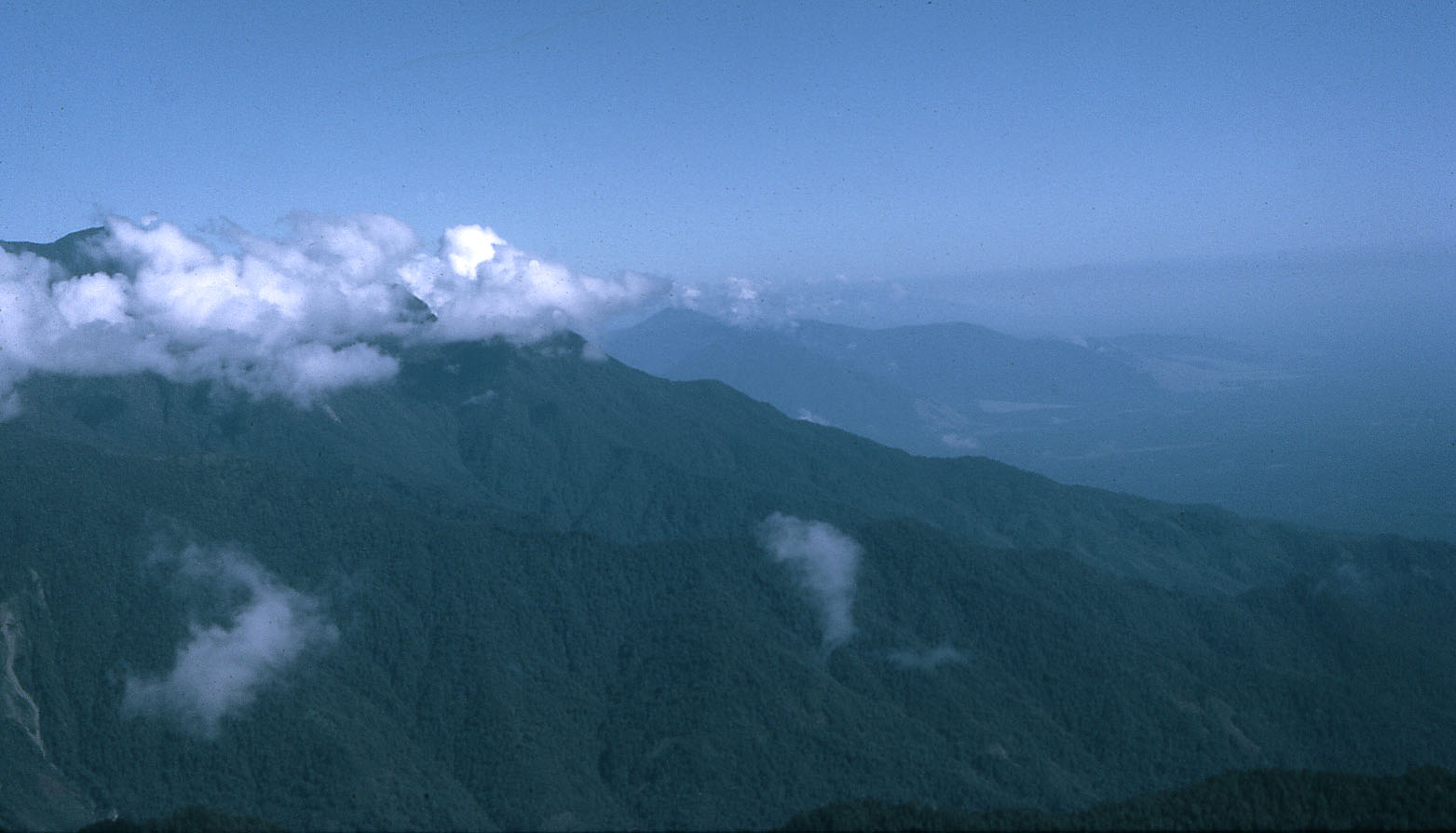
Jungle clad mountains of the Owen Stanley Range in Central Papua New Guinea.

The range is flanked by broken and difficult country, particularly on the south-western side. There are few practicable passes, the easiest being the famous Kokoda Track which crosses the range between Port Moresby and Buna and was in use for more than 50 years as a regular overland mail-route. Another route used by the 900 men of the US 2nd Battalion, 126th Infantry Regiment, 32nd Division, was the Kapa Kapa Trail, parallel to but 50 kilometres (30 mi) to the southeast of the Kokoda Track. They took nearly five weeks to cover the 210 kilometres (130 mi) track over extraordinarily difficult jungle terrain, from 14 October to 20 November 1942.

Immense ridges, or "razorbacks," followed each other in succession like the teeth of a saw. As a rule, the only way the troops could get up these ridges, which were steeper than along the Kokoda Trail, was either on hands and knees, or by cutting steps into them with ax and machete. To rest, the men simply leaned forward, holding on to vines and roots in order to keep themselves from slipping down the mountainside.

Vehicular roads, though not impossible, would be very difficult and expensive to construct. In fact one was constructed during World War II crossing from Wau in the north to Bulldog in the south and known as the Bulldog Track. It was largely due to the impossibility of transporting heavy equipment across the range that the Japanese failed to secure Port Moresby as a base early in 1942. The mountains are rough and precipitous, with occasional fertile plateaus which are occupied by native food-gardens.

== Eponyms ==
Two species of reptiles are named after Owen Stanley Range, Papuascincus stanleyanus and Toxicocalamus stanleyanus.

== See also ==
- Australian Encyclopaedia. Vol. 6, p. 430. Grolier.
- Owen Stanley Range languages
