= Mount Wilhelm =

Highest mountain in Papua New Guinea

- Enduwa Kombuglu' / Kombugl'o Dimbin
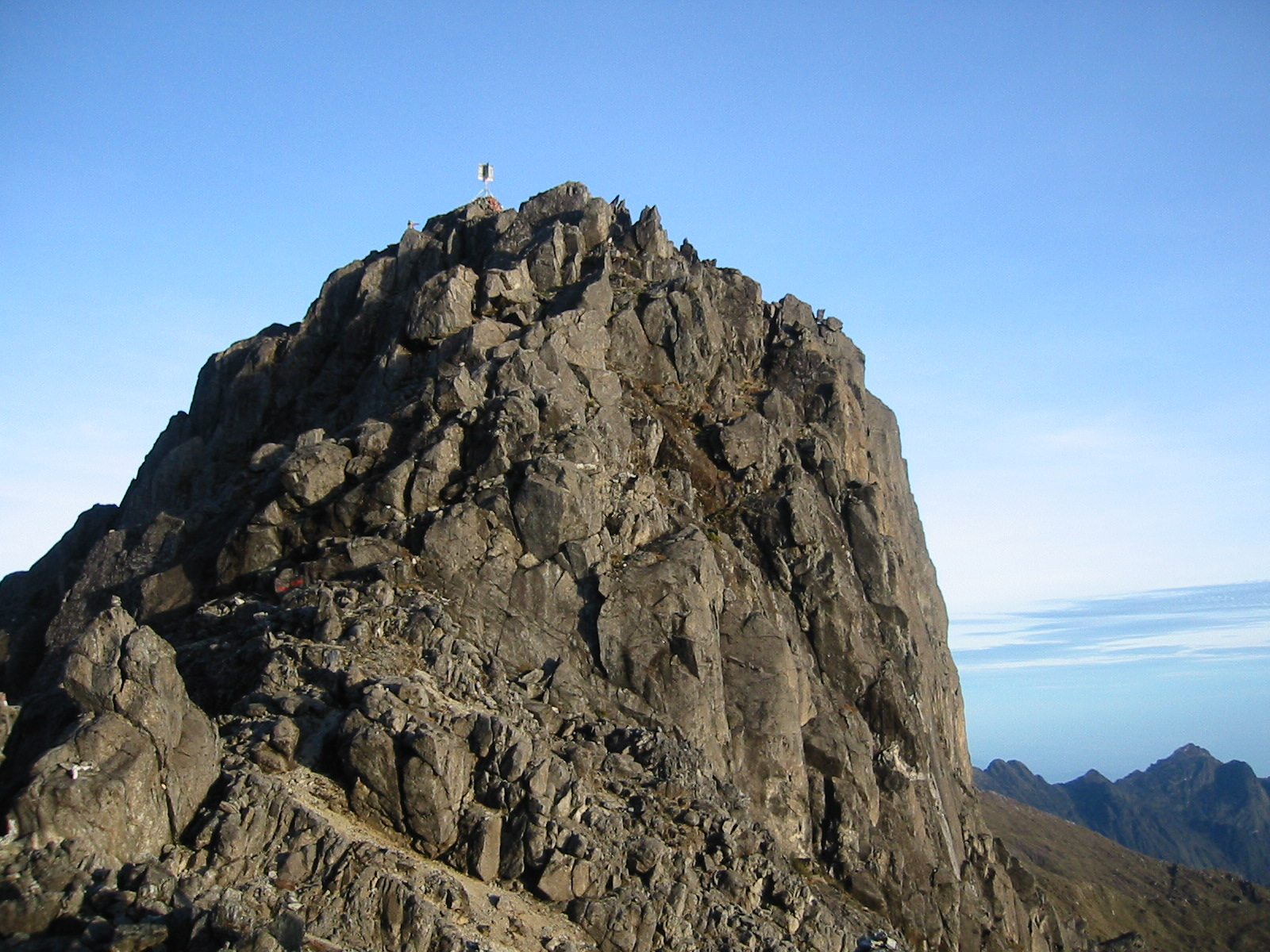
- The granite peak of Mount Wilhelm

Highest point
- Elevation: 4,509 m (14,793 ft)
- Prominence: 2,969 m (9,741 ft); Ranked 97th
- Listing: Country high point Ultra, Ribu; Seven Summits
- Coordinates: 05°48′S 145°02′E

Geography
- Location within Papua New Guinea
- Location: Intersection of Chimbu, Jiwaka and Madang provinces in Papua New Guinea
- Parent range: Bismarck Range

Climbing
- First ascent: 15 August 1938 by Leigh Vial
- Easiest route: Rock scramble

Mount Wilhelm (German: Wilhelmsberg) is the highest mountain in Papua New Guinea at 4,509 metres (14,793 ft). It is part of the Bismarck Range and the peak is the point where three provinces, Chimbu, Jiwaka and Madang, meet. In the local Kuman language, the peak is also known as Enduwa Kombuglu or Kombugl'o Dimbin.

The mountain is on the island of New Guinea, which incorporates Papua New Guinea and the Indonesian provinces of Papua. It is surpassed by Puncak Jaya, 4,884 m (16,024 ft), and several other peaks in Indonesian Papua.

Mount Wilhelm may be considered the highest mountain in Oceania (including Australia and New Zealand) according to present political boundaries of nation states, while Puncak Jaya contends for the same title based on physical geography. A Seven Summits list thus sometimes includes Mount Wilhelm.

== History ==
=== Discovery ===
Mount Wilhelm received its name in 1888 when a German newspaper correspondent, Hugo Zöller, climbed the Finisterre Range, south-east of Madang, and named the Bismarck Range after the German Chancellor, Otto von Bismarck, and the four highest peaks of the range after him and his children: Ottoberg, Herbertberg, Marienberg and Wilhelmberg. Ottoberg seemed to Zöller to be the highest of the range, but it was later discovered to be only 3,540 metres (11,600 ft) and the distant Wilhelmberg was much taller.

It was not until August 1938 when Leigh Vial, a government patrol officer, made the first recorded ascent, with two Niu Ginians, his "Mangi mastas", "Namba Wan Bare Kuakawa" (Kugl'kane) and "Gend" ("Mondia Nigle"). It was noted by Vial that even though the mountain was close to the equator, snow existed on top of the mountain during his ascent.

=== Second World War bomber crash ===
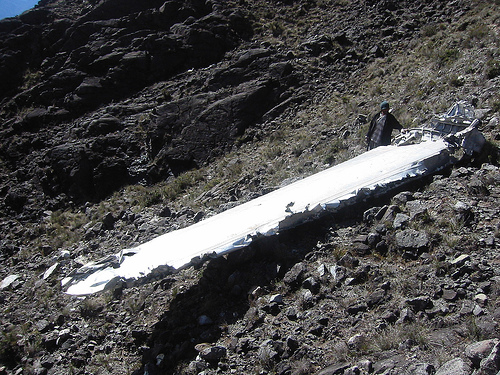
A wing from the wreckage of a US Air Force plane that crashed into Mount Wilhelm

On 22 May 1944 during World War II, an American F-7A (a converted B-24 Liberator) named "Under Exposed" crashed into the mountain while it was flying too low. The aircraft left from Nadzab airbase, close to Lae, and had been assigned for a reconnaissance mission to photograph Padaidori Island in Dutch New Guinea. Around 0400 the plane crashed into Wilhelm at about 4,000 metres (13,000 ft) above the twin lakes. All of the crew were killed, and most of the wreckage landed in the highest lake although some can still be seen. The only remains at the site are from the plane, as all of the bodies have been recovered.

=== Climbing deaths ===
A number of people have died trying to climb the mountain. An Australian Army Sergeant, Christopher Donnan, died in December 1971 when he fell down a steep slope. There is a plaque at the point where he was last seen. In August 1995 an Israeli backpacker died after he sprained his ankle and stayed behind while his group continued. He subsequently wandered off the track and fell into a ravine in the pre-dawn darkness. His body was found about a week later. On July 30, 2005, 58-year-old Bob Martin, a marketing manager at Air Niugini, suffered a heart attack and died near the summit. In 2001, a student from Muaina High School died at Piunde-foot of Mount Wilhelm. He was later found to have suffered from asthma. A local Papua New Guinean from Tari died in 2007 a few meters south of the Christopher Donnan plaque. Local sources revealed that the deceased was unaware of the warning and was wearing only his sporting suit, T-shirt and Dunlop shoes. He was covered by debris and fallen rock fragments, forming a talus at the base of the southern tip of the Christopher Donnan section.

== Ascending ==
Dawn breaking on top of Mount Wilhelm

NASA Landsat image of Mount Wilhelm

Mount Wilhelm is the most accessible mountain to climb in Papua New Guinea. Climbers have a choice of two different routes to the top. The most common route starts from the village of Keglsugl at the end of the road from Kundiawa in Simbu province. A harder hike and climb starts from the village of Ambullua in Western Highlands province.

The Keglsugl route involves climbing up and through a mountain rain forest and then along an alpine grassland glacial valley to the twin lakes of Piunde and Aunde. At Piunde there are two huts, one being an old Australian National University monitoring station and the other an 'A-Frame' hut. Though not a technical climb, various sections can be treacherous in wet weather. The climb is usually started during the night; the ascent and subsequent descent can take anywhere from nine to 24 hours. Reaching the peak at dawn allows a better chance of clear weather.

The other route from Ambullua is a much more challenging four-day hike.

== See also ==
- Seven Summits
- List of highest mountains of New Guinea
- Mount Leonard Murray
- Puncak Jaya
