= Dindaw Razi =

Mountain in Myanmar

Coordinates: 28°25′N 97°45′E

- ဒင်းဒေါရာဇီ

Highest point
- Elevation: 5,466 m (17,933 ft)
- Prominence: 450 m (1,480 ft)

Geography
- Location: Kachin State, Burma

Dindaw Razi (Burmese: ဒင်းဒေါရာဇီ) is one of Burma's highest mountains, and with its height of 5,466 m (17,927 ft) and one of the highest mountains in South East Asia. It is located in the northern Myanmar state of Kachin in an outlying subrange of the Greater Himalayan mountain system on the border with China.
