= Mount Sarawaget =

Mountain in Papua New Guinea

- Location within Papua New Guinea

Highest point
- Elevation: 4,121 m (13,520 ft)
- Prominence: 1,701 m (5,581 ft)
- Listing: Ultra, Ribu
- Coordinates: 6°18′39″S 147°05′24″E

Geography
- Location: Morobe Province, Papua New Guinea
- Parent range: Saruwaged Range

Mount Sarawaget is the highest mountain in Morobe Province, Papua New Guinea. It lies in the Saruwaged Range and at 4,121 m (13,520 ft) it is one of the highest mountains in the country. The name "Mount Bangeta" is sometimes used synonymously, but in other sources it is a distinct summit.

== See also ==
- List of highest mountains of New Guinea
- List of Ultras of Oceania
