= Sheankala Razi =

Mountain in Myanmar

Coordinates: 28°22′N 97°54′E

Sheankala Razi (Burmese: ရွီးကုလား ရာဇီ, Chinese: 布宗拉, romanized as Buzongla) is one of Myanmar's highest mountains, and with its height of 16,404 ft (5,000 m) and one of the highest mountains in South East Asia. It is part of the Hengduan Mountains and is located on the border between the northern Burmese state of Kachin with Tibet.
