= Phonyin Razi =

Mountain in Myanmar

Coordinates: 27°39′22.9″N 96°57′50.1″E

- ဖုန်ရင် ရာဇီ

Highest point
- Elevation: 4,282 m (14,049 ft)

Geography
- Location: Putao Kachin State, Burma

Phonyin Razi (Burmese: ဖုန်ရင် ရာဇီ) is one of Burma's highest mountains, and with its height of 4,282 m (14,050 ft) and one of the highest mountains in South East Asia. It is located in the northern Myanmar state of Kachin in an outlying subrange of the Greater Himalayan mountain system near the border with India.
