= Perkison =

Mountain in Aceh Province, Indonesia

Mount Perkison
- Pungongesong
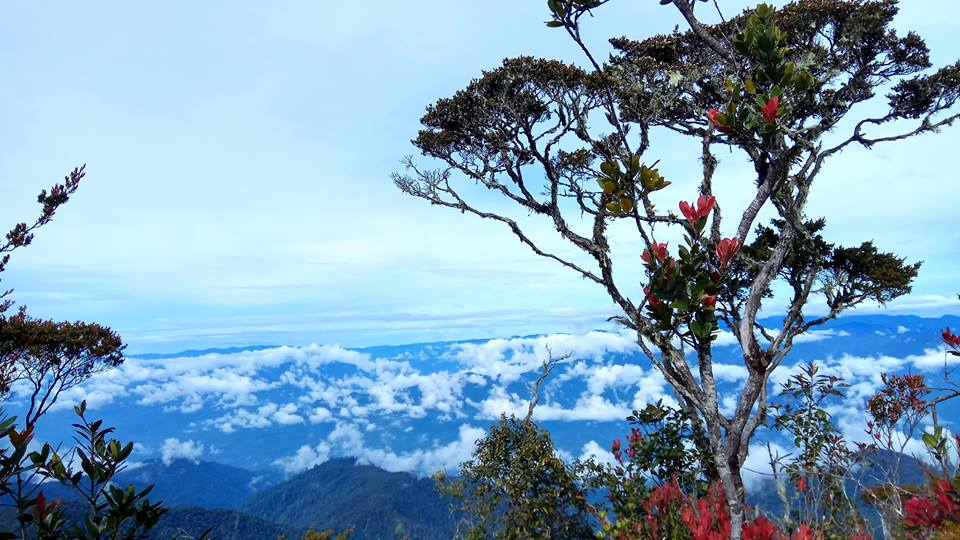
- Mount Perkison Peak (2019)

Highest point
- Coordinates: 3°37′20″N 97°51′26″E

Geography
- Location within Sumatra
- Location: Southeast Aceh Regency, Aceh Indonesia
- Parent range: Bukit Barisan

Geology
- Mountain type: Non-volcanic

Perkison, also known as Mount Phokisen or Pungongesong, is a mountain located in Southeast Aceh Regency, Aceh Province, Indonesia. It has an altitude of 2,828 metres (9,278 ft) above sea level and is part of the Barisan Mountains. It is located about 30 km (19 mi) from Kutacane, the capital of Southeast Aceh, and part of its area is included in the Gunung Leuser National Park.

== Geography ==
Mount Perkison is located in a mountainous area bordering North Sumatra Province. Its remote location makes this mountain have limited access. This mountain is dominated by tropical mountain forests and moss forests, which are typical at high elevations. The Alas River flows around this area, contributing significantly to the ecosystem in the area.

== Ecology ==
Mount Perkison has a rich diversity of flora, including several species typical of Sumatra's tropical forests. One is the Rafflesia flower, one of the largest flowers in the world that grows on the path to the mountain area. Other dominant vegetation includes lush moss forests at certain altitudes, creating a unique habitat for endemic plant species. The Mount Perkison area is home to various fauna, including the Magpie Robin, which is often seen in the moss forest.

== Conservation ==
Mount Perkison plays an important role in the local ecosystem, not only as part of nature conservation, but also as a water source for the surrounding community. Its geographical and ecological environment has been used to show the importance of protecting this area from the threat of deforestation and human exploitation.
