= Mount Suckling =

Mountain in Papua New Guinea

- Goropi
- Location within Papua New Guinea

Highest point
- Elevation: 3,676 m (12,060 ft)
- Prominence: 2,925 m (9,596 ft); Ranked 106th
- Listing: Ultra, Ribu
- Coordinates: 9°40′09″S 149°00′39″E

Geography
- Location: Papua New Guinea
- Parent range: Goropu Mountains

Mount Suckling or Goropi, is the highest peak of the Goropu Mountains, part of the Owen Stanley Range in south-eastern Papua New Guinea. It lies about 250 kilometres (160 mi) east of Port Moresby. Situated on a relatively narrow peninsula, it lies only about 60 km (40 mi) from the sea to both the north-east (in the direction of Collingwood Bay) and the south. While not the highest peak in the Owen Stanley Range (Mount Victoria is the highest), it is the most topographically prominent peak in the range, and it is in fact the third most prominent peak on the island of New Guinea. The peak rises above the timberline, while its lower slopes are well-forested.

The Maisin people inhabit the area around Mount Suckling. As of 1972, Mount Suckling had been "very inadequately explored" by Westerners. Norman Cruttwell initiated an expedition to the peak, which eventually reached the summit after several unsuccessful attempts. They found the peak "so inaccessible that [they] had to be dropped by helicopter into a gorge at 1500m and find [their] way to the top." They climbed via the south spur of the mountain, named "Goe Dendeniwa"; the second word means "red" and refers to the uniformly red color of the rocks and vegetation on the spur.
