= Sudirman Range =

Mountain range on New Guinea

Barisan Sudirman
- Dugunduguoo
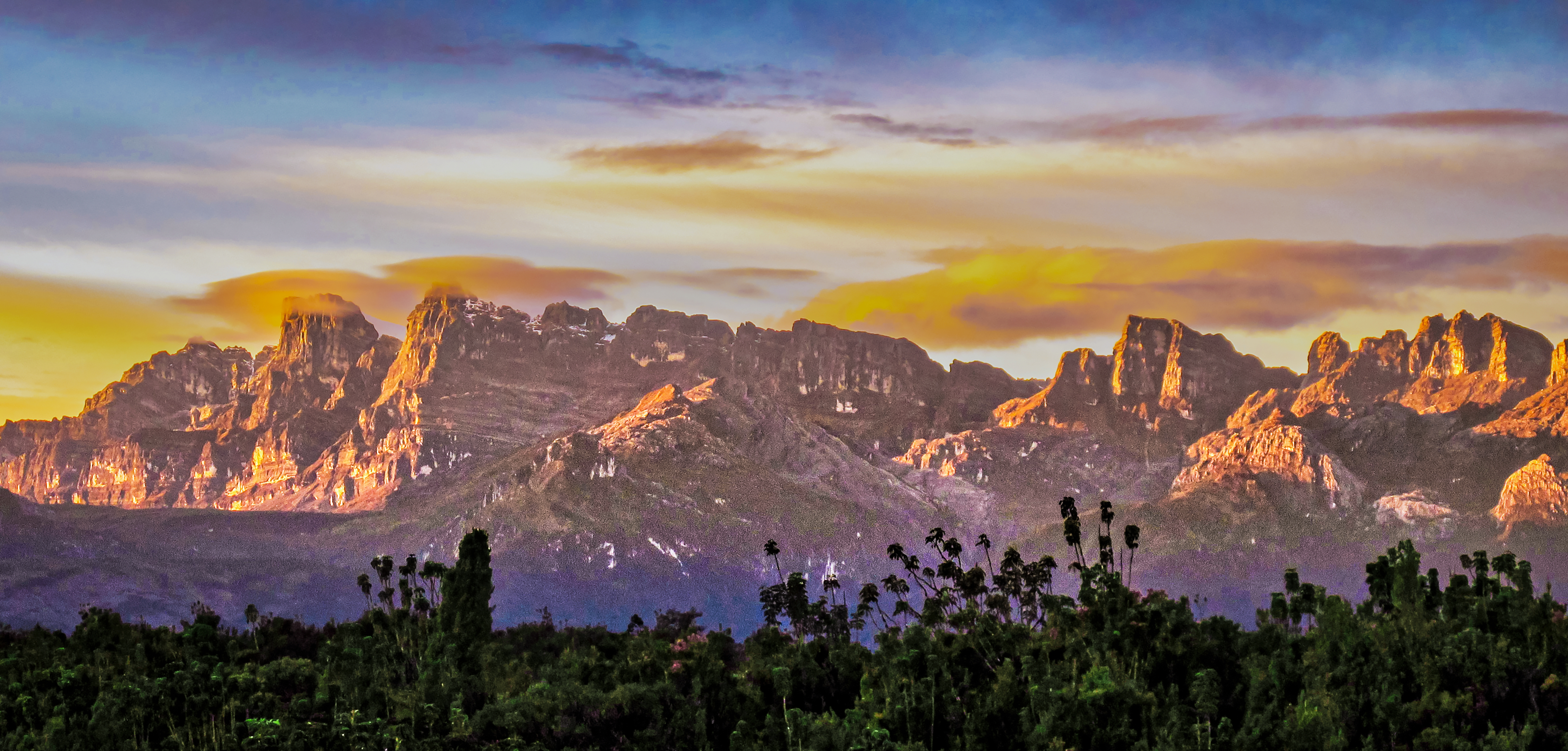
- Sudirman range located at the western part of the Maoke Mountains

Highest point
- Peak: Puncak Jaya, Indonesia
- Elevation: 4,884 m (16,024 ft)
- Coordinates: 4°4′44″S 137°9′30″E

Dimensions
- Length: 320 km (200 mi)

Geography
- Puncak Jaya and its surroundings
- Country: Indonesia

The Sudirman Range, also known as the Snow Mountains, Dugunduguoo, or Nassau Range is a mountain range in Central Papua province, Indonesia. It is named after the first armed forces commander-in-chief and Indonesian national hero Sudirman. It is a western sub-range of the Maoke Mountains. The highest peak in Oceania and Australasia, Puncak Jaya (4,884 m), is located here, as are other significant peaks such as Sumantri (4,870 m), Ngga Pulu (4,863 m), and Carstensz East (4,820 m or 4,808 m).

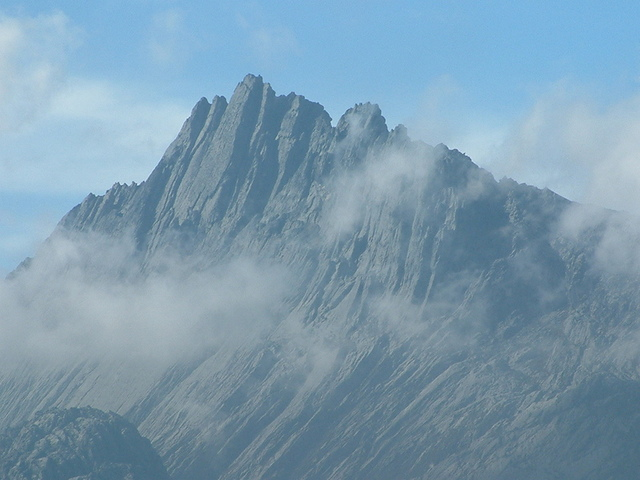
Puncak Jaya in the center of the Sudirman Range

== Geography ==
The Sudirman Range is located in the western part of Papua's Central Cordillera, separated from the mountains to the east by the Baliem Valley. Its mountains are of marine sediment origin and are the tallest peaks in the tropical Pacific.

The Sudirman Range is home to bird species such as Snow Mountain quail (Anurophasis monorthonyx), Snow Mountains robin (Petroica archboldi), orange-cheeked honeyeater (lichenostomus chrysogenys), and black-breasted mannikin (Lonchura teerinki). Mammal species endemic to the range include the white-toothed brush mouse (Coccymys albidens), mountain water rat (Baiyankamys habbema), dingiso (Dendrolagus mbaiso), alpine woolly rat (Mallomys gunung), and Arianus's rat (Rattus omichlodes).

The land of the Sudirman Range (particularly the space between Ilaga, Central Papua and Puncak Jaya) is sparsely populated, although the Dani people travel to the high mountains hunting birds and echidnas.

== Challenges ==
The nearby Lorentz National Park is threatened by pollution from mining activity at the Grasberg copper and gold mine, operated by the Freeport company based out of the United States. Mining activity also presents an obstacle to those involved in mountaineering.

== See also ==
- Lorentz National Park
