= Carstensz East =

Mountain in Indonesia

- East Carstensz Top
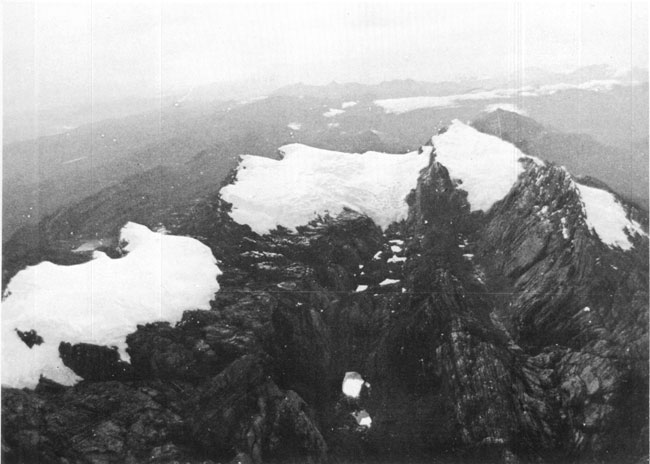

Highest point
- Elevation: 15,814 ft (4,820 m)
- Prominence: 280 m (920 ft)
- Coordinates: 4°05′00″S 137°17′22″E

Geography
- Location within Western New Guinea
- Location: Central Papua, Indonesia
- Parent range: Sudirman Range

Climbing
- First ascent: 5 December 1936
- Easiest route: rock/snow climb

Carstensz East (or East Carstensz Top, Carstensz Oriental, Carstensz Timor) is a 4,820 metre (15,814 feet) tall sub-peak of Puncak Jaya (or Carstensz Pyramid). It contains the Carstensz glacier on its eastern slope but it is retreating rapidly.

It used to be considered the second highest peak in Oceania, but has now been surpassed by Sumantri.
