= Mount Albert Edward (Papua New Guinea) =

Mountain in Papua New Guinea

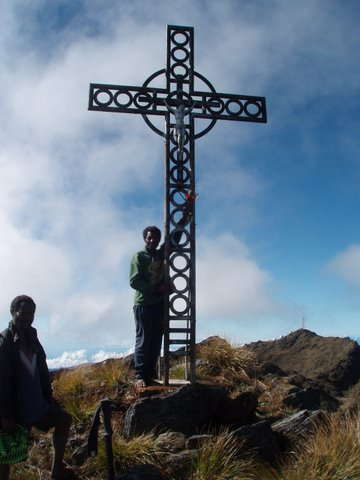
- The cross on top of Mount Albert Edward

Highest point
- Elevation: 3,990 m (13,090 ft)
- Prominence: 1,017 m (3,337 ft)
- Listing: Ribu
- Coordinates: 8°24′40″S 147°24′14″E

Geography
- Location within Papua New Guinea
- Location: Central Province in Papua New Guinea
- Parent range: Wharton Range

Climbing
- First ascent: 1906 by C A W Monckton

Mount Albert Edward is a 3,990-metre-high (13,091 ft) mountain in the Wharton Range in Central Province, Papua New Guinea. The mountain consists of two peaks about 400 metres apart, a cross marks the top of the slightly higher western peak and a trig station marks the eastern peak. The mountain lies approximately 120 km north of Port Moresby.

The first recorded ascent was in 1906 by C A W Monckton. There were further ascents in the early 20th century, but the first detailed account was made in 1935 following an ascent by Richard Archbold and Austin L. Rand in 1933.
