= Bismarck Range =

Mountain range in Western Highlands Province, Papua New Guinea

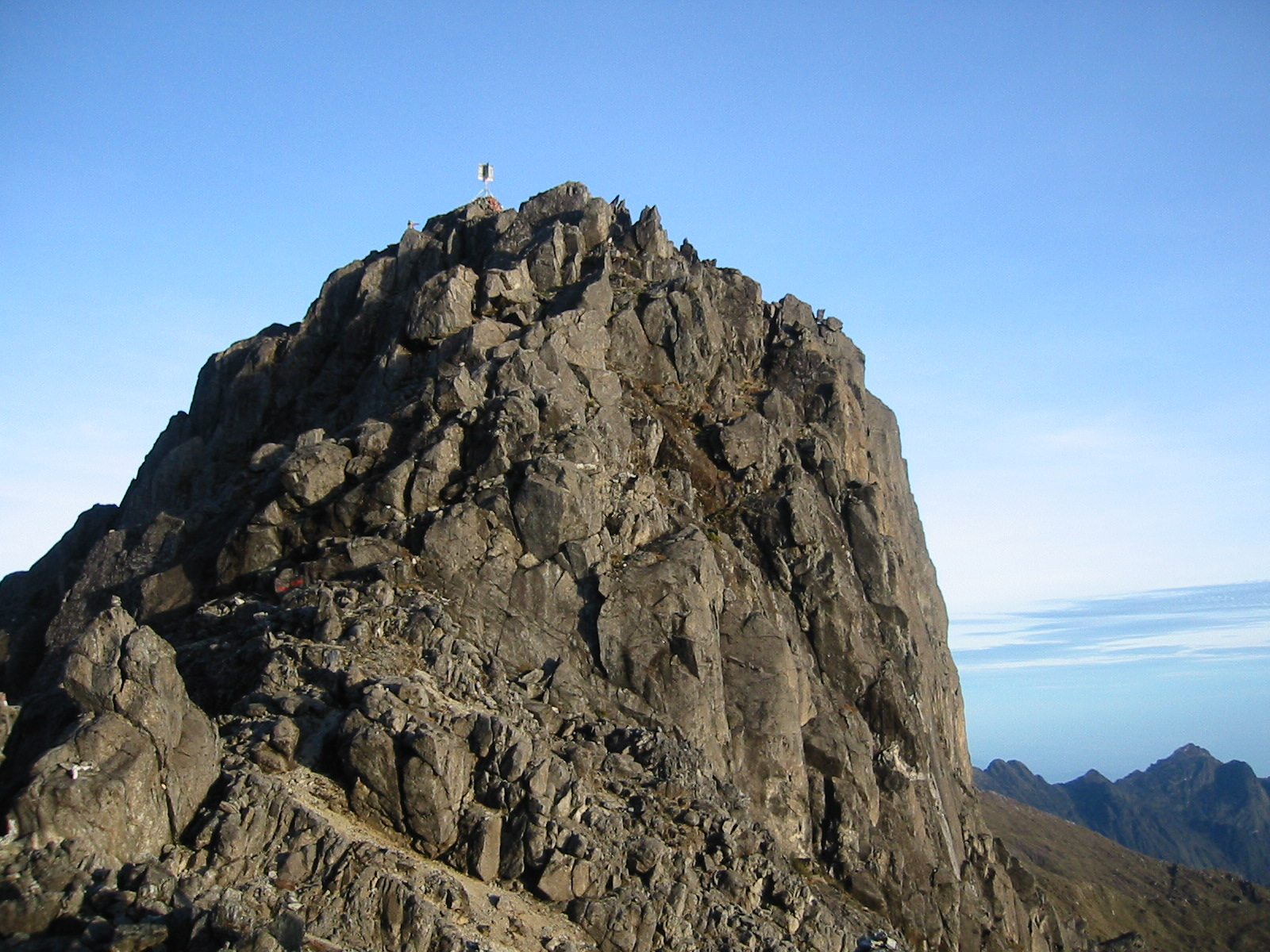
- Mount Wilhelm in the Bismarck Range

Highest point
- Peak: Mount Wilhelm
- Elevation: 4,509 m (14,793 ft)
- Coordinates: 5°48′S 145°02′E

Geography
- Location within Papua New Guinea
- Country: Papua New Guinea
- Provinces: Simbu; Madang; Western Highlands
- Range coordinates: 5°30′S 144°45′E

The Bismarck Range is a mountain range in the Western Highlands Province of Papua New Guinea. The range is named after the German Chancellor Otto von Bismarck.

The highest point of the range and the country is Mount Wilhelm at 4,509 metres (14,793 ft). At over 3,400 metres (11,155 ft), the landscape is alpine with tundra, in spite of the tropical climate. The Ramu River has its source in the range.

The Bismarck Forest Corridor, which bridges the provinces of Chimbu, Eastern Highlands, Jiwaka, and Madang, is located on the Bismarck Range. This corridor is an intact montane forest composed of Papua New Guinea oak and beech forest. The forest is a critical habitat for endangered species such as the Goodfellow's tree-kangaroo, giant rats, and many species of birds of paradise.

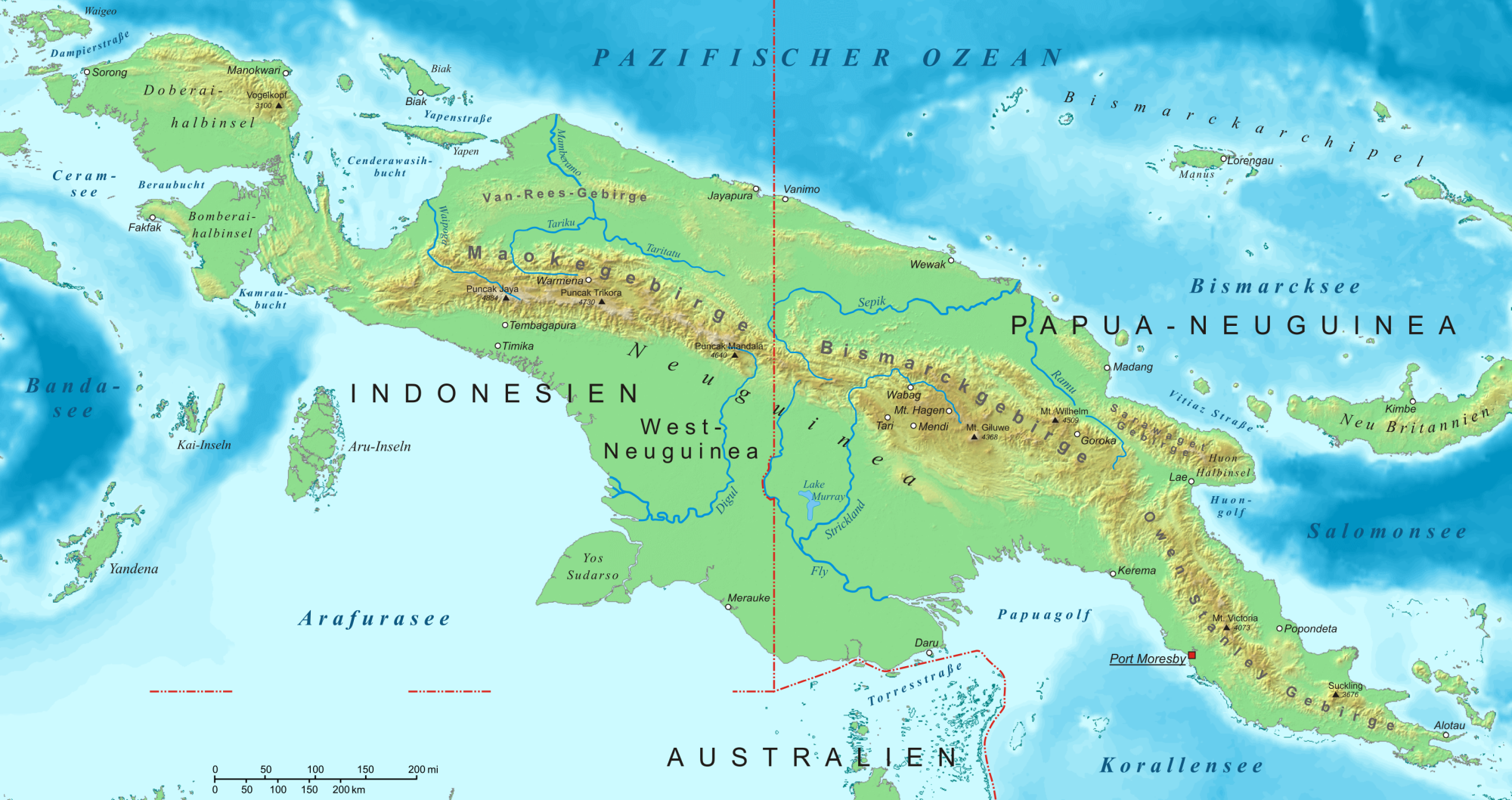
The Bismarck Range on the Papuan side (east of the border)
