= Mount Victoria (Papua New Guinea) =

Mountain in Papua New Guinea

- Location within Papua New Guinea

Highest point
- Elevation: 4,038 m (13,248 ft)
- Prominence: 2,738 m (8,983 ft)
- Listing: Ultra, Ribu
- Coordinates: 8°53′33″S 147°32′00″E

Geography
- Location: Central Province in Papua New Guinea
- Parent range: Owen Stanley Range

Climbing
- First ascent: 1889 by Sir William MacGregor

Mount Victoria is the highest point in the Owen Stanley Ranges in Central Province, Papua New Guinea at 4,038 metres (13,248 ft). It lies approximately 75 km north-north-east of Port Moresby and can be seen on a clear day from the city. The Mountain was named in honour of the British Queen Victoria by Commander Charles B Yule.

== History ==
Originally known as just the Great Mountain there had been several attempts to scale the peak by British colonialists in the 1880s. These attempts had failed after clashes with local villagers.

The first successful recorded ascent was in 1889 by the British New Guinea Administrator, Sir William MacGregor. MacGregor had been in the territory as Administrator for only six months before he was compelled to launch an expedition to climb the mountain for himself.

Starting on 17 May 1889, MacGregor approached the mountain from the west via the Vanapa River. His party included his private secretary J.B Cameron, a Samoan half-caste and thirty-eight Papuans and Polynesians. After ascending two smaller mountains, Mount Musgrave and Mount Knutsford, MacGregor eventually climbed the Great Mountain on 11 June and promptly renamed it Mount Victoria in honour of Queen Victoria. Brisbane-born Chas C. Baines in 1953 led a team of native carriers on a successful ascent. He had taken leave from his post as Port Moresby-based radio technician for Radio 9PA.

== See also ==
- List of highest mountains of New Guinea
- List of Ultras of Oceania
