= Maoke Mountains =

Mountain range in Indonesia

Coordinates: 4°00′S 138°00′E

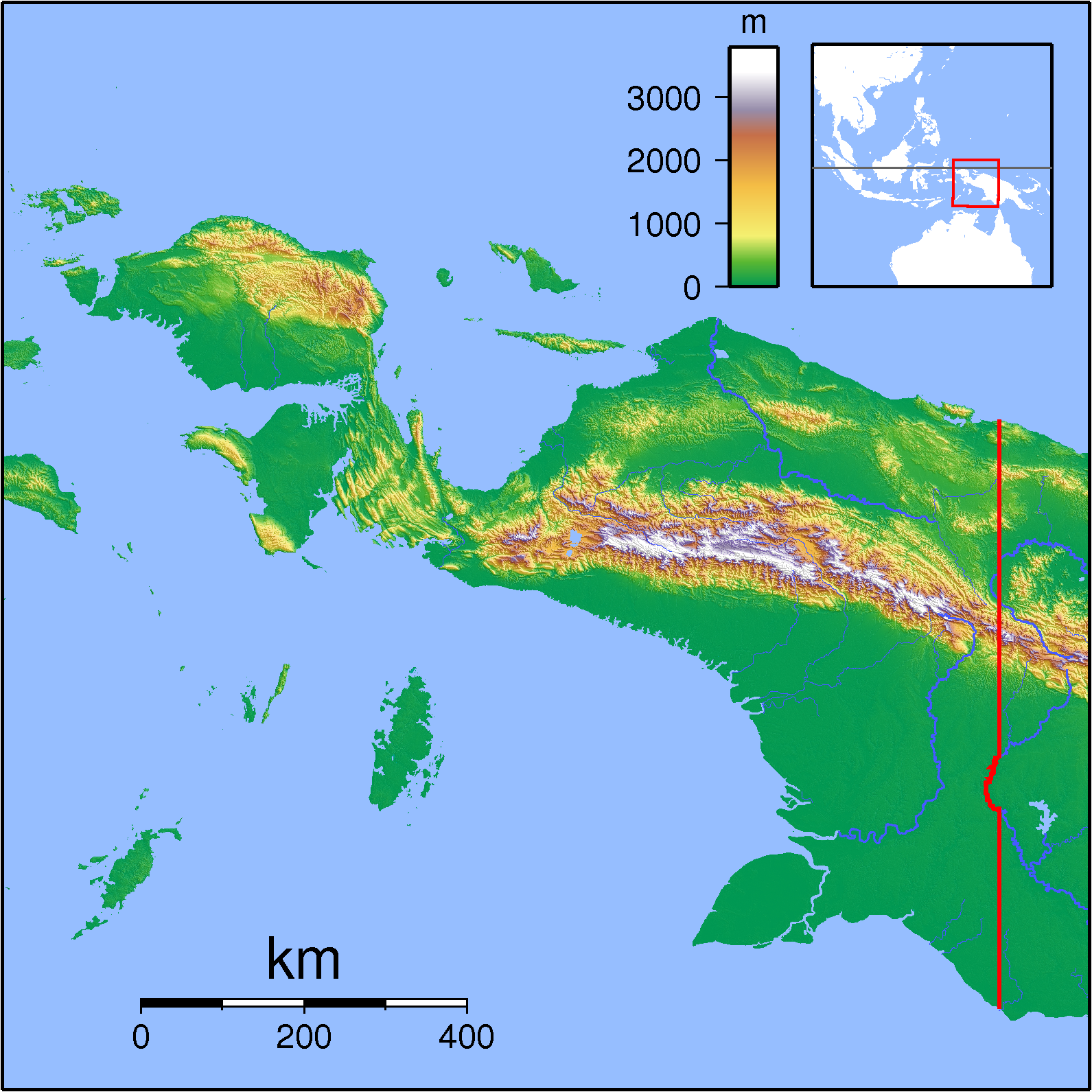
The Maoke Mountains in Western New Guinea

The Maoke Mountains is a mountain range in the province of Central Papua and Highland Papua. It extends over 692 km and is composed of the Sudirman and Jayawijaya ranges. It is part of the larger New Guinea Highlands or Central Cordillera.

Although Maoke means 'snow' in the local language, the glacier on Puncak Trikora in the Maoke Mountains disappeared completely some time between 1939 and 1962.
