= Ben Saunders (explorer) =

English polar explorer, endurance athlete, and motivational speaker

- Born: Benjamin John Saunders; 5 August 1977 (age 49); Plymouth, Devon, England
- Occupations: explorer, motivational speaker
- Known for: First return journey on Shackleton and Scott's route to the South Pole; youngest solo trek to the geographic north pole
- Website: www.bensaunders.com

Benjamin John Saunders (born 5 August 1977 in Plymouth) is an English polar explorer, endurance athlete, and motivational speaker. He led the first return journey to the South Pole on foot via Shackleton and Scott's route in 2013–14, and skied solo to the North Pole in 2004. Saunders has skied more than 3,700 miles (6,000 km) on polar expeditions since 2001. He holds the record for the longest human-powered polar journey in history (2,888 km) and for the longest solo Arctic journey by a Briton (1,032 km).

== Biography ==
The elder of two boys, Saunders grew up in Devon and Kent, was educated at the Royal Military Academy Sandhurst, and worked as an instructor at the John Ridgway School of Adventure. He is a Fellow of the Royal Geographical Society, an Ambassador for the Prince's Trust, a Patron of British Exploring, a supporter of The Duke of Edinburgh's Award and the Orchid Cancer Appeal, a past Honorary Vice-President of the Geographical Association, and an honorary member of the Cordon Rouge Club. In July 2016 Saunders was awarded an Honorary Fellowship by the University of Northampton.

Saunders has contributed to publications including Worldchanging: A User's Guide for the 21st Century and 'The Middle of Nowhere' published by Lonely Planet. He also spoke at the 2005 and 2014 main stage TED conferences.

== Expeditions ==
=== North Pole ===
Saunders first attempted to reach the North Pole in 2001 on a two-man unsupported expedition led by Pen Hadow that started from the Arctic Cape in Siberia, Russia. The pair were unsuccessful in attaining the Pole but reached a point close to 87° North, after 59 days on the Arctic Ocean.

In April 2003, Saunders completed a 240 km solo round-trip to the North Pole from the temporary Russian ice station, Barneo.

In spring 2004, he set out to make a solo and unsupported crossing of the Arctic Ocean on foot, following a planned route from the Arctic Cape to Ward Hunt Island, Canada, via the North Pole. Saunders was dropped off by a Russian Mil Mi-8 helicopter on 5 March 2004, reached the North Pole on 11 May 2004, and was picked up on the Canadian side of the Arctic Ocean by a Kenn Borek Air Twin Otter ski plane on 14 May 2004.

Saunders' claim to have reached the North Pole solo in 2004 is disputed by ExplorersWeb, a website maintained by explorers Thomas and Tina Sjögren, who consider only expeditions that begin their journey on land to be valid. His 2004 expedition started 70 km north of Siberia's Cape Arktichevsky, with his online journal reporting 50 km of open water north of the Russian coastline that prevented him starting from land. ExplorersWeb listed Saunders' 2004 journey to the North Pole as a "partial expedition" on their database of expedition records.

In 2004, Australian explorer Eric Philips argued that this categorization of expeditions may have been a factor in the death of Finnish explorer Dominick Arduin, who died at the Arctic Cape in March 2004: "I can't help but think that this tragedy permeated as a result of the pressure placed on adventurers to have their expeditions regarded as unsupported. Again, Explorers Web and others are placing undue pressure on the adventuring community by categorizing expeditions on their achievements... we should not be pressured into feeling that our efforts fall short of somebody else's parameters."

On 27 March 2008, Saunders set out from Ward Hunt Island, Canada, with the aim of setting a speed record. The current record, 36 days 22 hours, was set in 2005 by a team guided by Canadian Matty McNair using dog sleds and numerous air-drops of food. In contrast, Saunders set out solo, unsupported, and on foot; he was halted after eight days, on 4 April 2008, due to a broken ski binding.

A second speed record attempt in March 2010 was unable to start due to a three-week period of adverse weather conditions on the far north of Canada's Ellesmere Island.

=== South Pole ===
Between October 2013 and February 2014, Saunders and Tarka L'Herpiniere made the first return journey to the South Pole from Ross Island on the same route attempted by Sir Ernest Shackleton on the Nimrod Expedition, and by Robert Falcon Scott on the Terra Nova Expedition. At 1,795 miles (2,888 km) the Scott Expedition is the longest human-powered polar journey in history. Saunders and L'Herpiniere set out from Ross Island on 26 October 2013, reached the South Pole on 26 December 2013 and finished their expedition at Ross Island again on 7 February 2014. The journey was not unsupported, since some supplies had to be delivered by air on their return journey.

Robert Swan OBE and Falcon Scott (Captain Scott's grandson) were patrons of the expedition.

== Publications ==
- Saunders, Ben (1 June 2017). Shackleton. illus. Rowan Clifford. London: Ladybird Books. ISBN 978-0-7181-8727-9.

== See also ==
- Ed Stafford, British adventurer
- Bruce Parry, British adventurer
- Børge Ousland, Norwegian explorer
- Henry Cookson, British adventurer
- Ranulph Fiennes, British adventurer
