= Four Poles Challenge =

Challenge to reach the North and South Pole, Everest, and Challenger Deep

The Four Poles

The Four Poles Challenge is an adventurer's challenge to reach the North Pole, the South Pole, the summit of Mount Everest and Challenger Deep.

The first person to reach all four locations was Victor Vescovo, who reached the top of Mount Everest on May 24, 2010, skied the last degree to the geographic South Pole on January 14, 2016, skied the last degree to the geographic North Pole in April 2017 with Eric Larsen and reached Challenger Deep in 2019.

The first woman to reach all four locations was Vanessa O'Brien, who reached the top of Mount Everest on May 19, 2012, skied the last degree to the geographic South Pole on December 15, 2012, with Scott Woolums, skied the last degree to the geographic North Pole on April 16, 2013, and reached Challenger Deep in 2020.

== See also ==
- Three Poles Challenge
- Explorers Grand Slam
- Challenger Deep
- Seven Summits
- Volcanic Seven Summits
- Seven Second Summits
- Seven Third Summits
