= Tashi and Nungshi Malik =

Indian mountain climbers (born 1991)

Malik twins
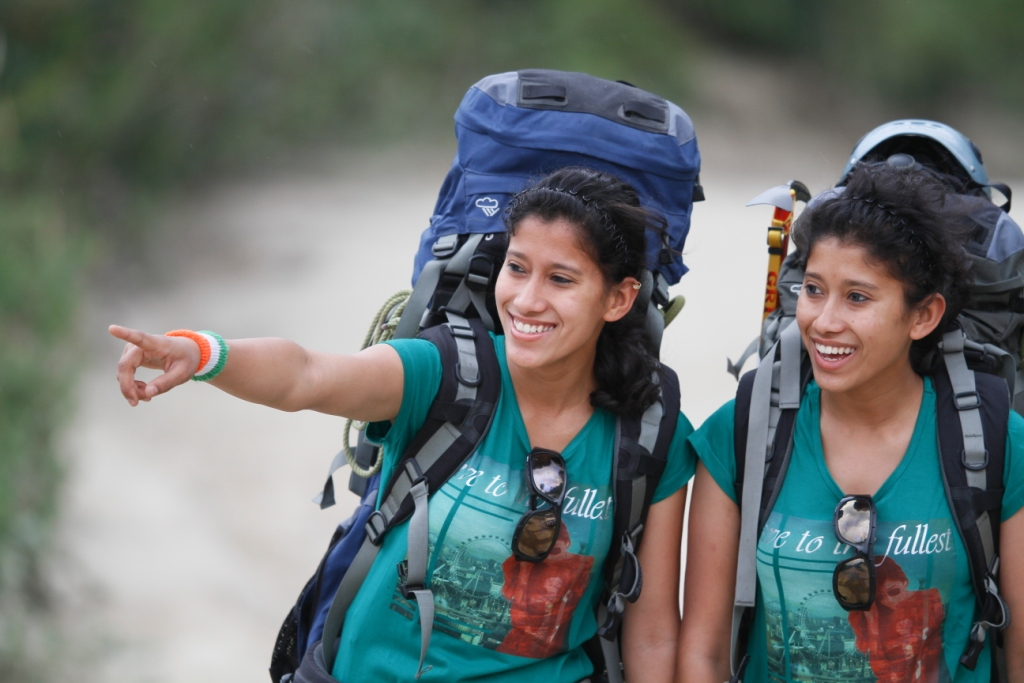
- Tashi and Nungshi Malik doing endurance trek at the foothills of Himalayas
- Born: Tashi Malik and Nungshi Malik; 21 June 1991 (age 35); Anwali village, Sonipat district , Haryana, India
- Occupation: Mountaineers/Explorers
- Known for: First female twins and siblings to climb Mount Everest, Seven Summits and completed the Explorer's Grand Slam.
- Website: twinclimbers.com

Tashi and Nungshi Malik (born 21 June 1991) are the first siblings and twins to climb the Seven Summits and reach the North and South Poles and complete the Adventurers Grand Slam and Three Poles Challenge.

== Personal life ==
The Malik twins (Tashi and Nungshi) originally hail from Haryana state, India. They were born to an Indian Army officer, Col. Virendra Singh Malik from village Anwali Sonipat district of Haryana, and his wife Anjoo Thapa. They settled in Dehradun after Col Malik's retirement from the Indian army.

The girls attended several schools in the states of Madhya Pradesh, Uttar Pradesh, Uttarakhand, Tamil Nadu, Kerala and Manipur, including Lawrence School, Lovedale, near Ootacamund. In 2013 they completed graduation in Journalism and Mass communication from Sikkim Manipal University. They have a Certificate in Peace and Conflict Resolution from School of International Training in Vermont, United States. In 2015 the twin sisters graduated in Sport and Exercise from Southern Institute of Technology, Invercargill, New Zealand.

On 13 April 2023, Nungshi Malik married Avinash Jacob Varghese in her home town Dehradun, Uttarakhand, India. Shortly after they moved to Invercargill, New Zealand where they currently reside.

== Mountaineering ==
The Malik sisters trained at the Nehru Institute of Mountaineering in 2010. On Sunday, 19 May 2013, they scaled Mount Everest, becoming the first twin sisters to do so. They were joined at the summit by Samina Baig and they placed the flags of India and Pakistan together to symbolise peace.

The twins participated in 'Climbathon 2013' where they scaled a virgin peak at 21000 ft funded by Indian Mountaineering Foundation in August 2013. They are also the first female twins to complete Seven Summits, complete the Explorers Grand Slam and the youngest people to complete the Three Pole Challenge. On 16 December 2014, after climbing Mount Vinson in Antarctica, they became world's first twins and siblings to scale the 'Seven Summits' together.

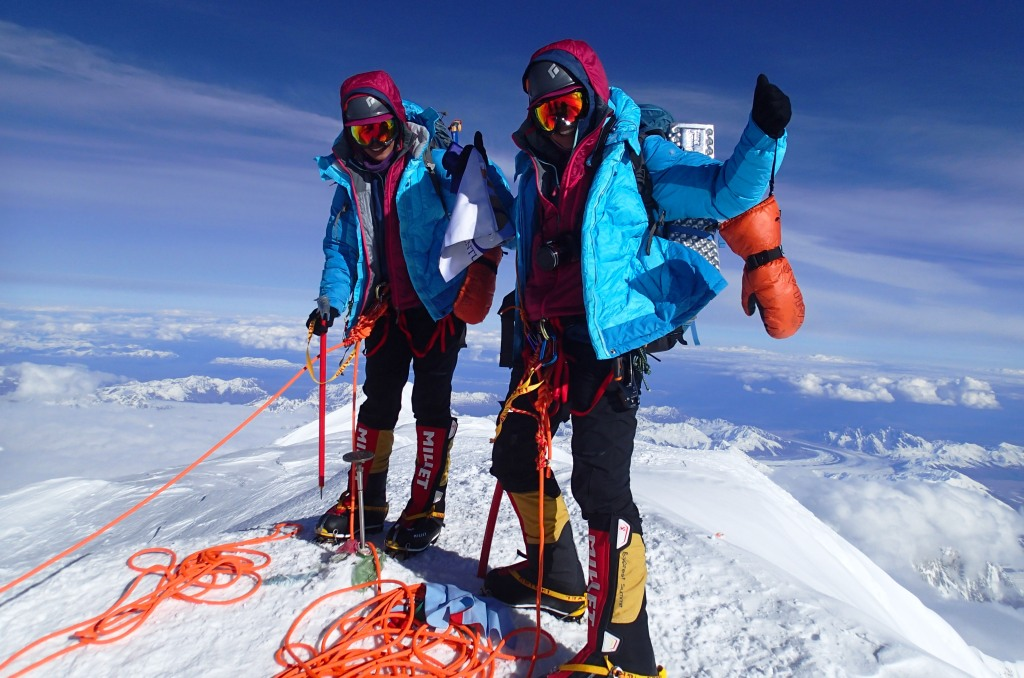
At summit of Mount McKinley, Alaska

After scaling Mount Everest on 19 May 2013 they completed the Explorers Grand Slam on 15 July 2015 in just over two years. They are the first Indian and South Asians to complete the Explorers Grand Slam. In Dec 2015, the twins scaled Aoraki (Mt Cook) New Zealand's tallest peak becoming first female twins to do so. In September 2019, Nungshi and Tashi led Indian 'Khukuri Warriors' in the World's Toughest Race: Eco-Challenge Fiji that pitched 66 teams of adventure athletes from 30 nations against forces of nature and against each other traversing 671 km of rugged Fijian landscape, ocean, rivers, lakes and jungles using dozen adventure activities. They became the first and only South Asians to participate in this global adventure race.

In 2019, the sisters were awarded the prestigious Edmund Hillary Fellowship by New Zealand Government.

== Seven Summits climbing details ==
No.	Image	peak	Elevation	Mountain Range	Continent	Date of Summit
1		Mount Everest	8,848 m (29,029 ft)	Himalaya	Asia	19 May 2013
2		Aconcagua	6,961 m (22,838 ft)	Andes	South America	29 January 2014
3		Denali	6,194 m (20,322 ft)	Alaska Range	North America	4 June 2014
4		Kilimanjaro	5,895 m (19,341 ft)	Eastern Rift mountains	Africa	15 July 2015
5		Mount Elbrus	5,642 m (18,510 ft)	Caucasus Mountains	Europe	22 August 2013
6		Mount Vinson	4,892 m (16,050 ft)	Sentinel Range	Antarctica	14 December 2014
7		Puncak Jaya	4,884 m (16,024 ft)	Sudirman Range	Australia	19 March 2014

== North pole and South pole ==
No	Image	Pole	Year
1		North Pole	21 April 2015
2		South Pole	28 December 2014

== Honours and awards ==
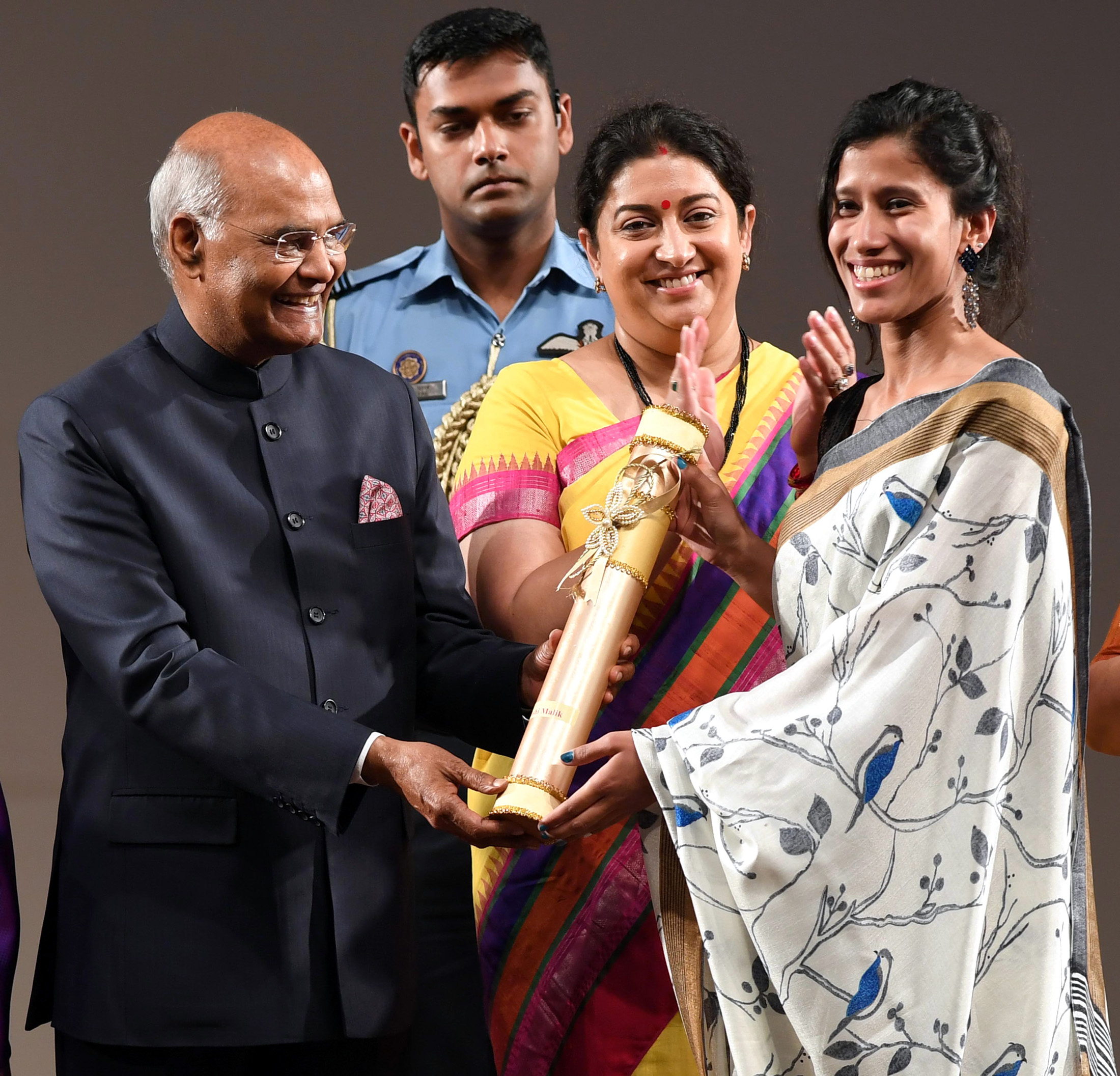
President Shri Ram Nath Kovind presenting the 2019 Nari Shakti Puruskar to Tashi Malik on 8 March 2020

- Awarded first New Zealand-India Sports Scholarship to study Graduation in Sport & Exercise at SIT, Invercargill, NZ
- Attended US Dept of State's 'Global Sports Mentoring Program' for emerging women leaders in sports in Sep-Oct 2015
- Conferred India's highest adventure honour 'Tenzing Norgay National Adventure Award' 2015 by the President of India on 29 August 2016
- In 2016 they were awarded the Leif Erikson Young Explorers Award in Iceland by president Guðni Th. Jóhannesson
- They were awarded the Nari Shakti Puraskar in 2020.

== See also ==
- Indian summiters of Mount Everest - Year wise
- List of Mount Everest summiters by number of times to the summit
- List of Mount Everest records of India
- List of Mount Everest records
- Height of Mount Everest

Awards
Preceded by Jessica Watson	Leif Erikson Young Explorer; 2016	Succeeded by Alex Bellini
