= Wang Lei =

Wang Lei is the name of:

- Wang Lei (basketball) (born 1986), Chinese professional basketball player
- Wang Lei (canoeist) (born 1981), Chinese sprint canoer
- Wang Lei (chess player) (born 1975), Chinese woman grandmaster chess player
- Wang Lei (fencer) (born 1981), world champion in fencing
- Wang Lei (figure skater) (born 1988), Chinese figure skater
- Wang Lei (footballer) (born 1995), Chinese footballer
- Wang Lei (Go player) (born 1977), professional go player
- Wang Lei (mountaineer), Chinese mountaineer
