= Masha Gordon =

British/Russian businesswoman, explorer and mountain climber

Maria Gordon
- Born: 13 February 1974 (age 52); North Ossetia
- Other names: Masha Gordon
- Occupation: Businesswoman
- Known for: World record for Explorers Grand Slam

Masha Gordon (born 13 February 1974) is a British businesswoman, explorer and mountain climber. Gordon spent 16 years working in finance and capital markets. She was managing director of Goldman Sachs and most recently led the emerging markets portfolio management team at PIMCO.

In October 2015 Gordon embarked on the Explorers Grand Slam female world record challenge. She has ascended the highest peaks on every continent and also skied the last degree to both the North and South Poles. She completed the Explorers Grand Slam challenge by reaching the summit of Mount Everest on 19 May 2016 and has set a women's speed record by reaching Denali via the Cassin ridge on 11 June 2016. By reaching two poles and the summit of Everest within just over 5 months she has also become the fastest woman to complete The Three Poles Challenge.

== Early years ==
Gordon was born and raised in the Soviet Union in North Ossetia, in a family of engineers. Her father, Vladimir Pavlenko, was an avid alpinist. Masha moved to Moscow to study journalism at the Moscow State University in August 1991.

She started her career as a reporter for The Washington Post in its Moscow bureau in 1992, and later studied in the United States; gaining a BA in Political Science from the University of Wisconsin and a Masters in Law and Diplomacy from The Fletcher School at Tufts University.

== Professional career ==
Gordon joined Goldman Sachs in 1998. She spent the next 12 years in the asset management division managing money in emerging markets equities. She gained prominence in her field and has been named a number of times a Manager of the Year in her asset class category by Morningstar and Lipper. Gordon was named Managing Director in October 2006. In 2009, Gordon moved to PIMCO to help the firm broaden its outreach beyond debt markets. She was named twice Top 40 under 40 by The Financial News.

Gordon moved to a portfolio career of non-executive board roles in 2014 and currently serves as the Chair of the Board of Constellation Oil Services, a deep water driller with operations in Brazil and India. Gordon is also on the Board of Advisors for the Fletcher School of Law and Diplomacy at Tufts University and the Council of the Girls Day School Trust.

Following Russia’s invasion of Ukraine, she stepped down as an independent non-executive director of Polyus, Evraz, MOEX, Detsky Mir, TCS and Alrosa.

== Explorers Grand Slam ==
Gordon started climbing in her mid-30s after a friend introduced her to alpinism in Chamonix, France. She spent the next seven years honing her technical skills across a variety of disciplines, including mixed climbing, ice climbing and ski mountaineering. In October 2015 Gordon embarked on an endurance challenge, the Explorers Grand Slam, and set out to beat the women's record, then held by Vanessa O'Brien. She has ascended the highest peak on each continent and also skied to both the North and South Poles. She became 46th person to complete the Explorers Grand Slam challenge when she reached the summit of Mount Everest on 19 May 2016 and has set the women's speed record by reaching the summit of Denali via the Cassin ridge on 11 June 2016

== Summits and expeditions of Explorers Grand Slam ==
- Kilimanjaro (22 October 2015)
- Elbrus (25 March 2015 and 10 March 2016)
- Aconcagua (7 February 2015 and 31 January 2016)
- Carstensz Pyramid (4 March 2016)
- Denali (11 June 2016)
- Vinson Massif (5 December 2015)
- Everest (19 May 2016)
- North Pole (19 April 2016)
- South Pole (15 December 2015)

== World records ==
- Fastest woman to complete the Explorers Grand Slam
- Fastest woman to scale the seven summits (Guinness)
- Fastest woman to complete the Three Poles Challenge

== GRIT&ROCK ==
Gordon is a founder of GRIT&ROCK, a charity which aims to help teenage girls from deprived, inner city backgrounds develop greater grit, determination and self-confidence through year-long mountaineering training programmes.
