= Khoo Swee Chiow =

Singaporean adventurer, author and speaker

- Born: November 16, 1964 (age 61); Port Dickson, Malaysia
- Occupations: Motivational speaker, author, consultant, and adventurer
- Known for: Member of the Singapore 98 Everest Expedition

Khoo Swee Chiow (Chinese: 邱瑞昭; pinyin: Qiū Ruìzhāo; Pe̍h-ōe-jī: Khu Suī-tsiau; born November 16, 1964, in Port Dickson, Malaysia) is a Singaporean adventurer, author, consultant, and motivational speaker. Khoo is the first Southeast Asian and the fourth person in the world to complete The Explorers Grand Slam, that is, the North Pole, the South Pole, and the Seven Summits.

== Expeditions ==
Khoo climbed Mount Everest in 1998 as a member of Singapore's first Mount Everest expedition. In 1999, he skied to the South Pole as the leader of Singapore first Antarctica expedition, covering a distance of 1,125 km in 57 days. In 2001, he climbed Mount Ararat in Turkey together with six other Everest summiteers from Turkey, Colombia, the United States and Mexico as part of a Peace Climb project to raise funds and promote international friendship. In that same year, he climbed Shishapangma in Tibet becoming the first South East Asian to climb an 8,000-metre peak without supplemental oxygen.

In 2002, he skied to the North Pole with Arctic guide Paul Landry and a dog named Apu, after failing the previous year due to frostbite on a finger. Khoo becomes the first Southeast Asian and the fourth person in the world to complete The Adventure Grand Slam, that is, the South Pole, the North Pole and the Seven Summits. He lost his bid to sail around the world in 2003, as his expedition was canceled due to lack of funding during the SARS outbreak and Iraq War period.

In that same year, he cycled from Singapore to Beijing in 73 days covering 8,066 km. In 2004, Khoo attempted to climb Mount Everest without oxygen but had to turn back 400 metres below the summit due to exhaustion.

On December 5, 2004, he successfully swam the Straits of Malacca from Tanjung Rupat in Indonesia to Port Dickson, in 22 hours over a distance of 40 km. He had been inspired to perform this feat at the age of six, after watching a Japanese man who was the first man to ever swim across the straits, starting his swim in front of his house. His attempt at swimming the English Channel in the summer of 2005, however, was unsuccessful due to hypothermia.

On July 31, 2012, Singapore adventurer and motivational speaker Khoo Swee Chiow, 48, has become the first Southeast Asian to reach the summit of K2 in Pakistan. The Seagate Technology K2 2012 expedition saw Mr Khoo reach the summit on the morning of July 31 after a 32-day climb in sub-zero temperatures. He was accompanied by an international team of 10 other climbers.

== World records ==
In December 2005, broke the Guinness World Record of the Longest Scuba Submergence (controlled environment). Khoo spent 220 hours underwater as opposed to the previous record of 212.5 hours. The record was subsequently broken on August 30, 2009, by Cem Karabay and now stands at 240 hours.

== Personal life ==
Khoo was born on 16 November 1964 in Port Dickson, Malaysia and became a Singaporean in 1999.

== Bibliography ==
In August 2003, Khoo published his first book called Journeys to the Ends of the Earth. His second book Singapore to Beijing on a Bike was published in June 2007.

== Everest summits ==
Mount Everest summits of Khoo Swee Chiow (Swee-Chiow Khoo)

- May 25, 1998
- May 23, 2006
- May 21, 2011

== See also ==
- List of Mount Everest summiteers by frequency
