= EverestMax =

EverestMax was the first expedition to successfully travel from the lowest point on land, the Dead Sea, to the highest point, Mount Everest, by unpowered means.

Led by Dominic Faulkner, a former UK SAS soldier, the six-person cycling team set out on 21 December 2005. Five months later, on 21 May 2006, three members of the team reached the summit of Everest.

The team cycled 5000 miles through Jordan, Syria, Turkey, Iran, Pakistan, India, Nepal and Tibet, before ascending Everest on foot from the Northern side.

The expedition consisted of five cyclists and two support staff, totaling seven members for the overland journey. Three members of the cycling team made it to the top of Everest - Pauline Sanderson, Dominic Faulkner and Jamie Rouen. Pauline Sanderson summited with her husband Phil Sanderson, becoming the first British couple to achieve this feat.

== See also ==
- Silk Road
- Tarka L'Herpiniere
- List of Mount Everest expeditions

== External sources ==
- http://www.thelongestclimb.com/
- http://www.domfaulkner.com/
