= Vanessa O'Brien =

American-British mountaineer (born 1964)

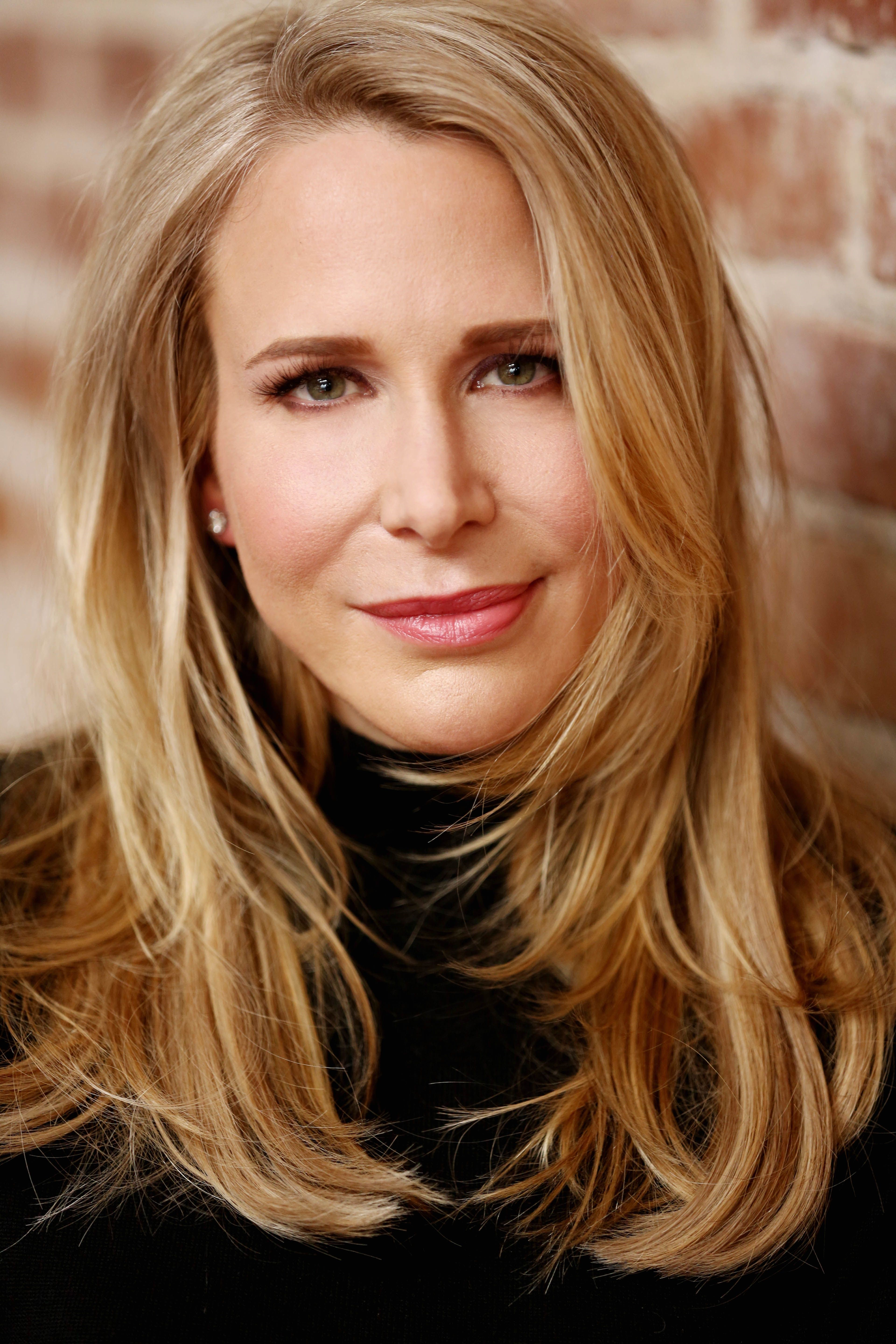
- Vanessa O'Brien in 2015
- Education: New York University Stern School of Business
- Website: www.vobonline.com
- Space career

Blue Origin Sub-orbital spaceflight Participant
- Flight time: 10 minutes, 20 seconds
- Missions: Blue Origin NS-22
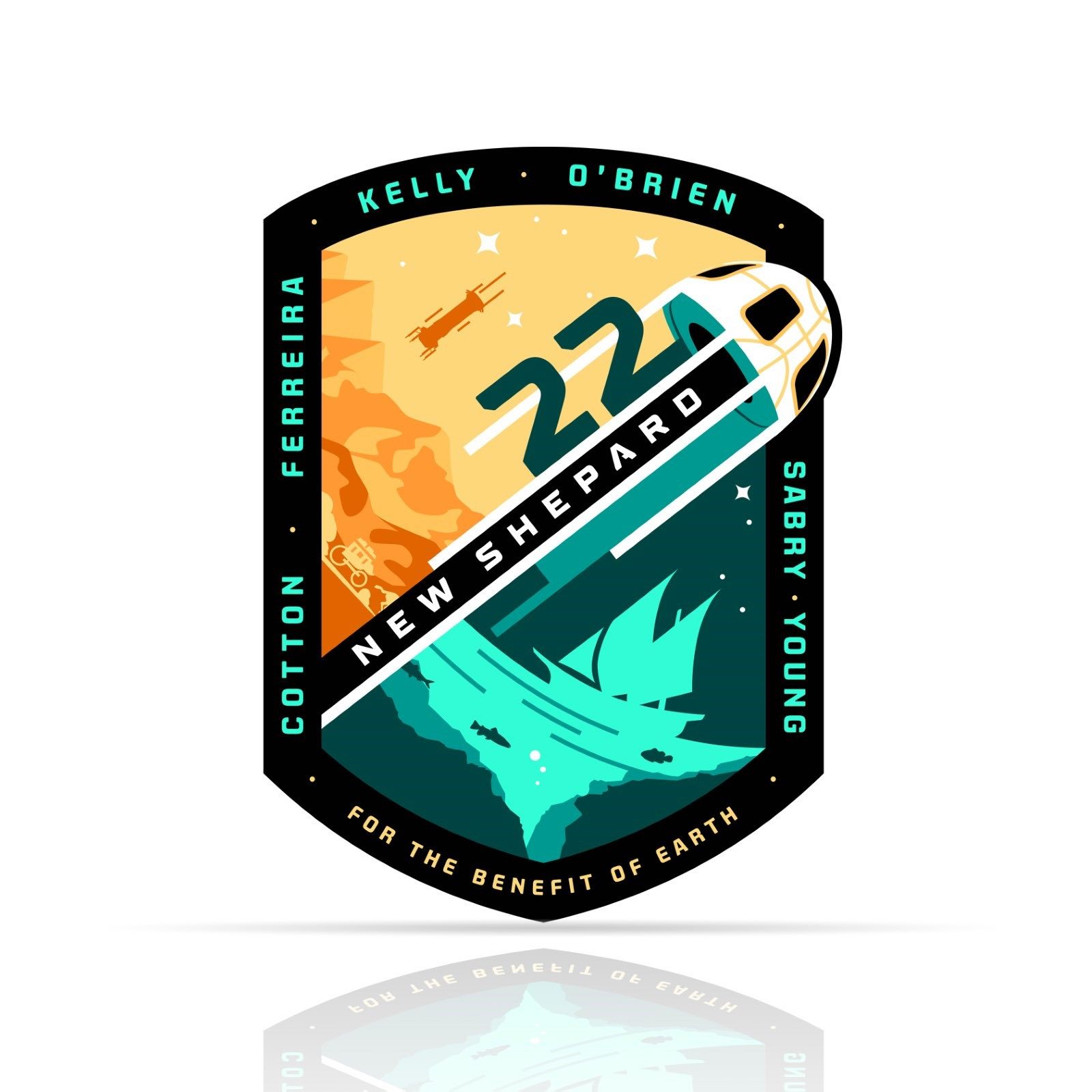
- Mission insignia

Vanessa Audi Rhys O'Brien is a British and American mountaineer, sub-orbital spaceflight participant, explorer, and former business executive. She is a Fellow of the Royal Geographical Society (RGS) and an Honorary Advisory Member of The Scientific Exploration Society (SES). Vanessa became a Dame of the Sovereign Military Hospitaller Order of St. John of Jerusalem, of Rhodes and of Malta, in 2023. O'Brien is also the author of To The Greatest Heights, a memoir detailing her mountaineering journey.

== Early life ==
O'Brien received her Bachelor of Arts in Economics and Executive MBA in Finance from New York University Stern School of Business. Vanessa O'Brien was named one of the Top 10 most famous NYU Stern MBA's in 2021. O'Brien worked as a Director of Finance and Business Development for Morgan Stanley, Barclays Bank, and the Bank of America.

== Expeditions ==
O'Brien reached the summits of a number of notable mountains, including five of the world's fourteen 8,000-meter peaks (Shishapangma, Everest, Cho Oyu, Manaslu, and K2), including summiting two eight thousanders back-to-back 8 days apart (Shishapangma and Cho Oyu). O'Brien decided to build on her passion for mountaineering and set herself the challenge of achieving the Explorers Grand Slam. The Explorers Grand Slam entails reaching the Seven Summits, the North and South Poles, as well as meeting the Three Pole Challenge.

O'Brien joined Caladan Oceanic's Ring of Fire expedition to the Pacific Ocean to survey the bottom of the Mariana Trench that constitutes Challenger Deep in partnership with NOAA, important at the time because of the travel restrictions during COVID-19. On 12 June 2020, Victor Vescovo and O'Brien descended to the "Eastern Pool" of Challenger Deep spending three hours mapping the bottom, with the dive scanning approximately one mile of desolate bottom terrain, finding that the surface is not flat, as once was thought, but sloping, and by about 18 ft (5.5 m), subject to verification.

O'Brien flew aboard Blue Origin NS-22, receiving FAA human spaceflight recognition, on 4 August 2022. For the sixth time in its 20-year history, Blue Origin successfully launched humans on a sub-orbital spaceflight on the New Shepard 22 mission. The five humans that flew with O'Brien included Coby Cotton, Mário Ferreira, Clint Kelly III, Sara Sabry, and Steve Young, flying to a height of 107 km above Mean Sea Level (351,232 ft MSL). The crew endured 3,603 km/h (2,239 mph) during ascent and flew for a total of 10 minutes and 20 seconds. This was the first spaceflight of Blue Origin involving two female crew members, and Vanessa O'Brien carried the UN Women's flag. She became the first woman to complete the Explorers' Extreme Trifecta – reaching extremes on land, sea, and air after she passed the Kármán line as part of Blue Origin NS-22 spaceflight.

After taking the American Red Cross flag to the North Pole in 2013, O'Brien completed the Boston Marathon in 2017 to help the American Red Cross raise over $512,000 for charity.

== Citizen scientist ==
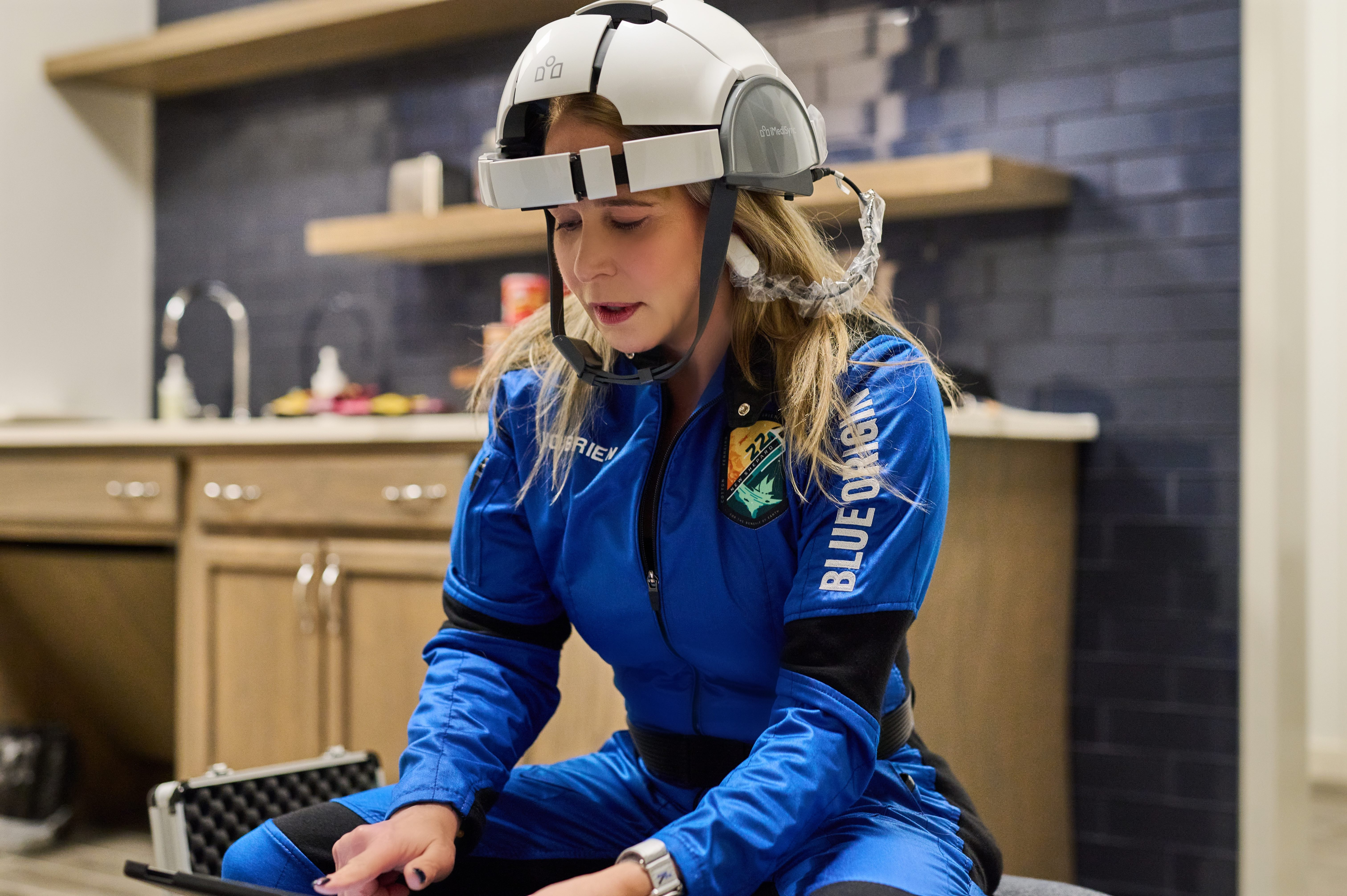
Vanessa O'Brien wears a wireless MRI device as her brain is scanned to measure the overview effect before and after the Blue Origin NS-22 mission on August 4, 2022.

O'Brien established the Citizen Science Trust to focus on research and experimental development on natural sciences after a decade collaborating with scientists. O'Brien’s scientific work began when she tested a direct correlation between acetazolamide and kidney stones at high altitude, giving herself kidney stones. She then participated in looking out for bar-headed geese on Mount Everest (how many, how high, how often), finding one at 4,370m.

O'Brien joined Tim Jarvis‘s 25zero project, where she photographed Ecuadorian glaciers in advance of COP21 and slept in altitude tents to determine whether a gas exchange would enhance performance at high altitude (it did not) before sampling glaciers for radiogenic isotopes. While climbing K2 she added 20 memorial plaques to honor those who lost lives climbing the savage mountain.

During her submersible dive, O'Brien trained on operating a robotic arm so she could pick up rocks from the ocean floor and took water samples using Niskin bottles to test for ocean acidification, which she called 'ocean osteoporosis'. O'Brien sourced expeditions for GAPS to take glacier snow samples, in an effort to measure atmospheric micro- and nano- plastics.

O'Brien partnered with iMediSync, a wireless MRI provider, and Dr. Andrew Newberg, a neuroscientist, to measure the overview effect during her suborbital spaceflight as part of the Blue Origin NS-22 mission.

== World records ==
O'Brien accumulated six Guinness World Records over nine years. Her first was for summitting the highest peak on every continent in 295 days, the fastest time by a woman. She also skied the last 60 nautical miles or 111 km to the South Pole and North Pole completing the Explorers Grand Slam in 11 months, becoming the first woman to do so in under a calendar year and the 8th woman in the world to accomplish this. In July 2017, she became the first American woman to summit K2 and the first British woman to summit K2 and return safely, successfully leading a team of 12 members to the summit and back on her third attempt. Vanessa received her second Guinness World record as the oldest female to climb the savage mountain, K2, at 52 years old.

On 12 June 2020, following the survey dive to the bottom of the Mariana Trench (Challenger Deep), O'Brien received her third Guinness World Record becoming the first woman to reach Earth's highest and lowest points. During this dive, O’Brien became the first woman to spend the longest ‘bottom time’ deeper than 10,000m for 3 hours, sustaining 8 tons of pressure, with her pilot Victor Vescovo. She received her fourth Guinness World Record as the first person to reach the Farthest (Chimborazo) and Nearest to Earth's core (Challenger Deep) and her fifth Guinness World Record as the first woman to complete the Four Poles Challenge, which includes reaching the North Pole, the South Pole, the summit of Mount Everest and Challenger Deep.

On August 4, 2022, O'Brien achieved her sixth Guinness World Record when she became the first woman to complete the Explorers' Extreme Trifecta, reaching extremes on land, sea, and air, after she passed the Kármán line on Blue Origin NS-22's sixth spaceflight. This was the first spaceflight of Blue Origin involving two female crew members, and Vanessa O'Brien carried the UN Women's flag. The next flight, NS-23, a science and payload only flight, exploded after detecting an issue in the rocket's engine nozzle. O'Brien tested a wireless MRI before and after her spaceflight to conduct a study on the overview effect.

== See also ==
- Seven Summits
- Explorers Grand Slam
- Three Poles Challenge
- Four Poles Challenge
- List of people who descended to Challenger Deep
