= Wang Jing (mountaineer) =

Mountaineer and co-founder of Toread Holdings Group Co., Ltd

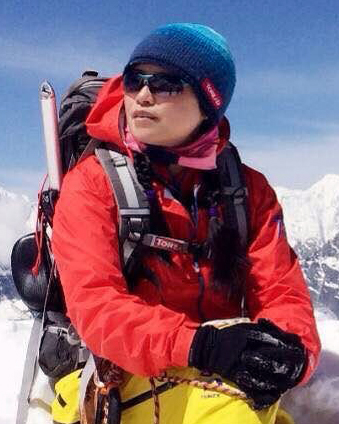
- Wang Jing in April 2014

Personal information
- Born: March 29, 1975 (age 51) Ziyang, Sichuan Province, China
- Occupations: Mountaineer, Explorer

Climbing career
- Major ascents: Fastest time for a woman to complete the Seven Summits & Fastest time for a woman to complete the Explorers Grand Slam with use of helicopter up to and over 6,000m to reach the summit of Everest.

Wang Jing (Chinese: 王静; pinyin: Wáng Jìng) is a Chinese climber, entrepreneur and member of The Explorers Club in the United States. Wang is best known for her feat in becoming the fastest woman in the world to complete the Explorers Grand Slam (Last Degree) in 143 days (4 months and 23 days) and the fastest woman to climb Seven Summits with an assist from helicopters (combined Mount Kosciuszko and Carstensz lists in 138 days, which is 4 months and 18 days). The Explorers Grand Slam involves reaching the highest peak on every continent plus at a minimum of skiing the last degree (111 km) to the North and South poles. Wang recorded this adventure in her book Silence of the Summit, which was published in English in December 2018.

== Toread ==
Wang is the chairwoman, CEO, and co-founder of Toread Holdings Group Co., Ltd. In China. The company offers outdoor products including clothing, shoes, and equipment, and went public on Shenzhen Stock Exchange in 2009. It was named Forbes Asia's 200 Best Under A Billion in 2014.

== Mountaineering ==
On January 15, 2014, Wang reached the South Pole, marking the start of her Explorers Grand Slam journey. The Seven Summits Jing climbed included Vinson Massif in Antarctica, Aconcagua of South America, Kilimanjaro of Africa, Carstensz Pyramid of Oceania, Elbrus Summit of Europe, Mount Everest of Asia, Denali of North America and Mount Kosciuszko of Australia – covering both the Messner and Bass lists of the Seven Summits.

Wang and a team of Sherpas caused controversy as the only team to reach the summit of Mount Everest after the 2014 avalanche that killed 16 Sherpas, by using a helicopter to get from Base Camp to Camp 2. Elizabeth Hawley put an asterisk next to Wang's ascent, marking it aviation-assisted. The Nepalese government provided her with a summit certificate for "her successful ascent in a time of crisis and uncertainty." As of 2016, helicopters now carry loads for Sherpa to Camp 1 as a matter of standard practice.

Wang received the title "International-Mountaineer 2014" and also "Nepal-China goodwill ambassador-2015" from the Nepalese government.

== Everest Future Foundation ==
Wang established the Everest Future Foundation to improve the standards of living of the Sherpa community, building schools, monasteries, and hospitals, and contributing to other welfare activities. One example is the Khumjung Gompa, a monastery located in the Khumjung village at the foot of the sacred peak of Khumbila at an altitude of 3,790m. This monastery is an important source of spiritual guidance to the local communities. On the 25th of April 2015 when an earthquake struck, leaving the monastery severely damaged, locals did not dare enter the monastery with the fear of sudden collapse. The Foundation donated 13,000,000 Rupees to support the reconstruction of Khumjung Gumba in 2017.

Jing has also donated to the Nepalese health and educational sectors in order to raise their standards. Along with this, she participated in activities cleaning up garbage in the Qomolungma high-altitude named "Clean The Mountain".

== Books ==
Wang has authored two books based on her mountaineering experiences, Life at Altitude and Silence of the Summit. The first book was first published in Chinese in 2013, telling Wang's story from a sportswear businessperson to a mountaineer. The second book, Silence of the Summit, was published in Chinese in 2016, focusing on her expedition in 2014. The English edition of Silence of the Summit was published in 2018.

== Expeditions ==
Fastest Seven Summits - Bass and Messner Lists 138 Days, Fastest Explorers Grand Slam – 142 Days
Date Climbed	Mountain	Height
January 15, 2014	South Pole	89 degree
January 19, 2014	Vinson Massif	16,050 ft.
January 31, 2014	Aconcagua	22,841 ft.
February 8, 2014	Kosciusko	7,310 ft.
February 15, 2014	Kilimanjaro	19,340 ft.
February 22, 2014	Carstensz Pyramid	16,023 ft.
March 14, 2014	Elbrus	18,510 ft.
April 8, 2014	North Pole	89 degree
May 23, 2014	Everest	29,035 ft.
June 6, 2014	Denali	20,320 ft.

Additional 8,000 meter Peaks
Mountain	Height
Cho Oyu	26,906 ft.
Makalu	27,825 ft.
Manaslu	26,759 ft.
Shishapangma	26,289 ft.
Everest	29,035 ft.
Lhotse	27,940 ft.
Broad Peak	26,414 ft.
