= Park Young-seok =

South Korean mountaineer (1963–2011)

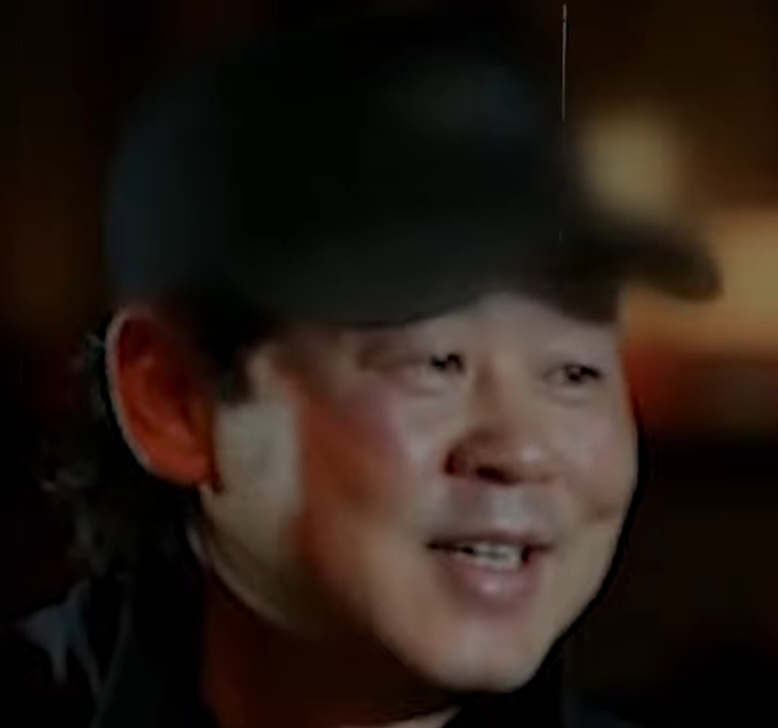
- Born: Park Young-seok; November 2, 1963; Seoul, South Korea
- Died: October 2011 (aged 47); Annapurna, Nepal
- Occupation: Mountaineer
- Known for: First person to complete the True Explorers Grand Slam

Korean name
- Hangul: 박영석
- Hanja: 朴英碩
- RR: Bak Yeongseok
- MR: Pak Yŏngsŏk

Park Young-seok (Korean: 박영석; Hanja: 朴英碩; November 2, 1963 – October 2011) was a South Korean mountaineer.

In May 2005, he became the first person in the world to complete a True Explorers Grand Slam. He climbed the world's 14 eight-thousanders, the Seven Summits, and trekked to both poles. He holds the world's fifth fastest time (behind Kristin Harila of Norway, Nirmal Purja of Nepal, Kim Chang-ho of South Korea, and Jerzy Kukuczka of Poland) for ascending the 14 eight-thousanders, he climbed six of the 8,000-meter Himalayan peaks within one year, and gained another record for reaching the South Pole on foot in 44 days, self-sufficient and without any food re-supplies.

== Achievements ==
	Name of Peak	Elevation (m)	Date of summit
1.	Everest	8,848	1993-05-16
2.	K2	8,611	2001-07-22
3.	Kangchenjunga	8,586	1999-05-12
4.	Lhotse	8,516	2001-04-29
5.	Makalu	8,463	2000-05-15
6.	Cho Oyu	8,201	1997-09-27
7.	Dhaulagiri	8,167	1997-04-27
8.	Manaslu	8,163	1998-12-06
9.	Nanga Parbat	8,125	1998-07-21
10.	Annapurna	8,091	1996-05-04
11.	Gasherbrum I	8,068	1997-07-09
12.	Broad Peak	8,047	2000-07-30
13.	Gasherbrum II	8,035	1997-07-19
14.	Shishapangma	8,027	2000-10-02
15.	Aconcagua	6,959	2002-01-11
16.	Denali	6,195	1994-06-02
17.	Kilimanjaro	5,895	1997-02-17
18.	Elbrus	5,642	2002-07-07
19.	Vinson Massif	4,897	2002-11-25
20.	Carstensz Pyramid	4,884	2002-05-11
21.	Kosciusko	2,280	2001-09-21
22.	South Pole	2,835	2004
23.	North Pole	Sea level	2005-04-30
24.	Everest; North-South Traverse	8,848	2006-05-11

== Disappearance ==
In October 2011, Park Young-seok, Shin Dong-min, and Kang Ki-seok decided to make another attempt on Annapurna's south face. Before the expedition, Park was quoted,

“I’m getting more and more likely to die. I live each day with a grateful heart, but a mountaineer who settles down is not a mountaineer… If a tiger loses its wildness, is it still a tiger? I was born with the luck of an explorer, so I think I’ll explore and climb mountains until the day I die.”

— Park Young-seok

Park and his other team members went missing after their last communications on October 18, 2011. His last words recorded on the base camp walkie talkie were "How do we get across that?"

The Korean Alpine Federation immediately launched a search and rescue operation. In the ten-day long rescue operation to find the missing climbers, no signs of Park, Shin or Kang were found. Presuming that the team had perished due to rockfall, the Federation decided to call off the operation on October 28, 2011.

The Korean Alpine Federation hosted a joint "Mountaineer's Funeral" for the climbers, and set up an incense burning altar, which was visited by over 4,000 mourners.

== Legacy ==
In 2016, construction began on the Park Young-seok Mountain Culture Center near Park's hometown of Sangam-dong, Mapo-gu, Seoul. The base camp opened in 2019. The facility comprises an urban park for indoor rock climbing, exhibition spaces and performance halls.

== See also ==
- List of 20th-century summiters of Mount Everest
- List of climbers and mountaineers
- List of Mount Everest summiters by number of times to the summit
- Mountaineering
