= Tom Sjogren =

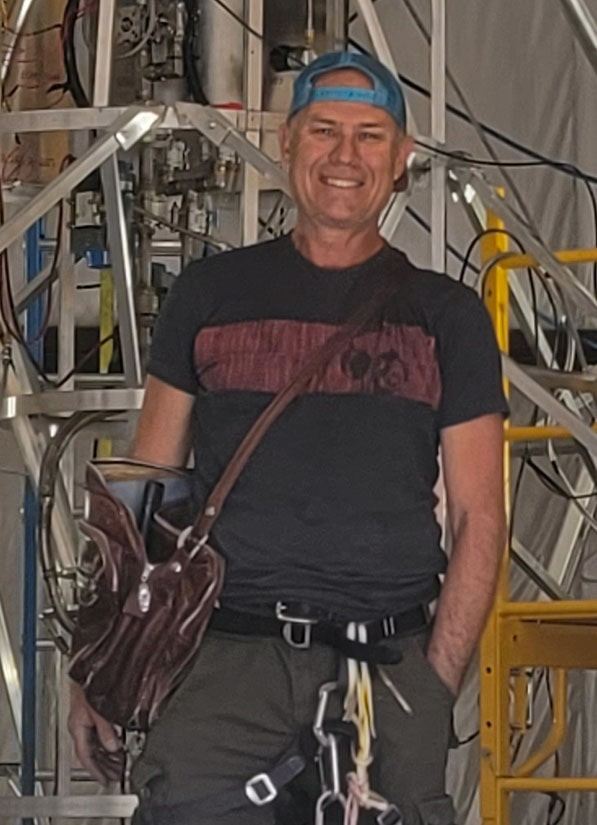
- Born: November 8, 1959 (age 66); Stockholm, Sweden
- Citizenship: United States, Sweden
- Education: Stockholm School of Economics
- Title: CTO and co-founder of Pythom
- Spouse: Tina Sjögren (married 1983-present)
- Awards: Fastest time to reach both Poles unsupported

Tom Sjogren (also spelled Thomas Sjögren) is the CTO and co-founder of Pythom, a Swedish-American aerospace company based in Bishop, California. With a background in exploration, Tom has completed the Three Poles Challenge - summited Mount Everest (1999) and skied unsupported to the South Pole (2001-2002) and North Pole (2002).

== Early life ==
Sjogren was born in Stockholm, Sweden, on November 8, 1959. In his youth, Tom competed in sailing and figure skating and attended Stockholm School of Economics. While studying, Tom met his soon to be wife Tina. They got married in 1983 and emigrated to New York City in 1996.

== Business career ==
Together with his wife Tina Sjögren, Tom was a professional explorer and completed the Three Poles Challenge. The couple did so, while also breaking the speed record of reaching both the South and North Pole unsupported, with a time of 118 days.

As part of their expeditions, the couple invented lightweight satellite communication software and hardware solutions, which later turned into a business with customers including NASA, NGOs, defense units, and extreme explorers. This business was run under their ExplorersWeb.com subsidiary, HumanEdgeTech.

In 2020, Tom and Tina founded Pythom, a California-based aerospace company which is currently in development of a complete human-rated space transportation system, including rockets, landers and spaceships for Earth, Mars, the Moon and asteroids. The space fleet is designed around successful principles from early Earth exploration: low cost, light travel, small and agile teams.

The couple has announced their aspiration of going to Mars on Pythom spacecraft within the end of this decade.

== Sources ==
- There Was A ‘Glass’ Before Google Came Along, And It Was Used In Antarctica In 2001, on Techcrunch
- Here's An Early Version Of Google Glass From 2001 Using Windows 98, on Business Insider
- Taking Technology to Extremes, on New York Times
- U.S. gains two new adventurers at naturalization ceremony in Oakland, on Mercury News
- How Humans Will Evolve on Multigenerational Space Exploration Missions, on Scientific American
- 2013 International Space Development Conference in San Diego (featured speakers)
- "Upload Every Mountain". Wired. March 21, 2006.
