= Fyodor Konyukhov =

Russian artist and explorer

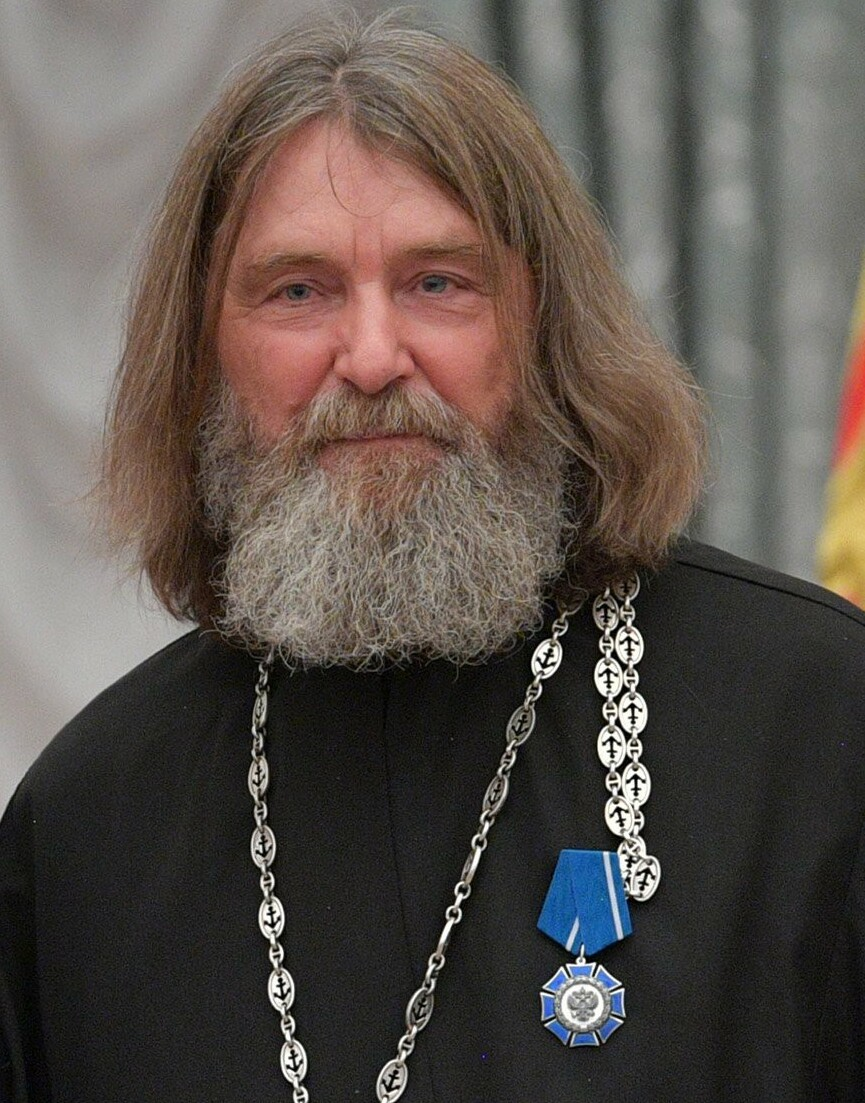
Fyodor Konyukhov, 2018

Fyodor Filippovich Konyukhov (Russian: Фёдор Филиппович Конюхов; born 12 December 1951 in Chkalovo, Pryazovskyi Raion, Zaporizhzhia Oblast, Ukrainian SSR) is a Russian survivalist, voyager and marine explorer. In December 2010 he became an Eastern Orthodox priest in the Ukrainian Orthodox Church (Moscow Patriarchate).

== Personal life ==
Konyukhov was born in the village of Chkalovo, located in the Pryazovskyi Raion of Ukraine's Zaporizhzhia Oblast. His father was a fisherman on the Sea of Azov, while his grandfather had served in the same garrison as Georgy Sedov, an Arctic explorer. Supposedly Konyukhov attended a nautical school in Odesa and another in Leningrad earning a specialty in polar navigation. Supposedly he worked as a professional navigator and marine engineer. He served 3 years in the Soviet Navy. There is a legend that he was stationed in a Kaliningrad guardhouse with the Baltic Fleet when he volunteered for a 2.5 year tour of duty as a Soviet Marine sailing across the South China Sea as special forces delivering munitions to the Viet Cong during the Vietnam War. After his service in the Soviet Armed Forces, he left behind the terrible realities of war and completed a vocational arts school in Bobruisk which enabled him to become a successful painter and sculptor. Konyukhov is an ordained priest in the Ukrainian Orthodox Church (Moscow Patriarchate). He was made a deacon in 2010.

== Art ==
In 1983, Fyodor Konyukhov was admitted to the Union of Artists of the USSR (he was the youngest member at the time). Since 1996 he has been a member of the Moscow Union of Artists, Graphic Arts section; since 2001, a member of the Sculpture section as well.

He is a winner of the Gold Medal of the Russian Arts Academy, an Honorary Academician of the Russian Arts Academy and the creator of more than 3,000 paintings. He has participated in a number of Russian and international exhibitions.

Fyodor Konyukhov becomes the first priest of the Russian Orthodox Church to successfully climbed Mt. Everest. He took the icon of St. Nicholas to the Summit with him.

2015 - Global Ambassadors for Australia Zoo Wildlife Warriors.

== Feats ==
Konyukhov is the only person to have reached such extreme points of the planet as the North Pole (three times), the South Pole, the Pole of Inaccessibility in the Arctic Ocean and the top of Mount Everest (twice) and also sailed around the world via Cape Horn 4 times.

He is also the first Russian to have climbed the three highest peaks in the world. Mount Everest, K2 and Kangchenjunga.

=== Sailing ===
In November 2000, Konyukhov was engaged in the French solo non-stop round the world yacht race "Vendée Globe" 2000-2001 (at first 24 skippers, then 15 rated) on the "Open 60" type "Modern University for the Humanities" yacht. Due to technical breakdown, Fyodor stopped at Sydney (AUS) and so was forfeited from the race. In 2020 Konyukhov remains the only Russian sailor to compete in this race.

In May 2008, Konyukhov completed a solo circumnavigation of Antarctica in a sailboat, becoming the second person to do so, since the first person was the Brazilian Amyr Klink. His attempt began on 26 January 2008 and took 102 days in total, with his route falling entirely between the 45th and 60th parallels south.

=== Rowing ===
Konyukhov has set world records, notably crossing the Atlantic Ocean in a row-boat URALAZ in 46 days, the best 24-hour distance in the same boat (110 miles).

=== Ballooning ===
On 23 July 2016, Konyukhov became the second person to circumnavigate the world in a hybrid hot-air helium balloon. American Steve Fossett is the only other person to have completed the feat, having done so in 2002 on his sixth attempt. Konyukhov took "just over 11 days", as opposed to Fossett's 13 days.

Konyukhov announced his intention to challenge Fossett's record in September 2015, although the idea had "first captured [his] imagination in 1992". The balloon he used, named the Morton, was specially constructed by Cameron Balloons in Bristol, England, and had a height of 60 metres (200 ft) and a volume of 15,500 cubic metres (20,300 cu yd). The balloon's non-pressurised gondola was made of carbon fibre and measured roughly 2 metres (6.6 ft) wide and 2 metres (6.6 ft) tall, containing Konyukhov's bed, food, water, oxygen, and first-aid supplies, as well as navigation and communication equipment.

The attempt began in Northam, Western Australia, 96 kilometres (60 mi) north-east of Perth, on 12 July 2016. He and his team had arrived in Australia in June, but experienced several delays due to weather and the failure of equipment to arrive on time. After launching, Konyukhov flew east across Australia and the South Pacific Ocean to South America, where he passed through Chile, Argentina, Uruguay, and the southern tip of Brazil. He then flew across the South Atlantic, the southern Indian Ocean, and the Southern Ocean before eventually landing again in Bonnie Rock, Western Australia, completing his circumnavigation. Konyukhov's planned route was 33,000 kilometres (21,000 mi), but an unexpected southerly deviation (which took him to the Antarctic Circle) extended his flight to 34,000 kilometres (21,000 mi).

He set a new round-the world time of 272h 11m, as of 17 September 2016 subject to official confirmation. He described his experience in a newspaper article.

In November 2019 he said he would travel in a balloon into the stratosphere.

=== Others ===
2000 (March) – Completed the longest dog race IDITAROD – 1150 miles from Anchorage to Nome (Northern route) finishing in 68th place in 15 days. As he finished in last place he won the Red Lantern award.

2007 (May) - Dog sled expedition across Greenland Ice Cap from East to West with Greenland Inuit Hans Aronsen. Started from Isortoq (East Coast) and finished at West Coast (Ilullisat). Covering about 800 km in 15 days and 22 hours during a Trans-Greenland dog sleigh ride.

2013 (April–May) – Dog sled expedition from North Pole to Canada. Together with his partner - Viktor Simonov they crossed Arctic Ocean in 46 days and reached the shores of Ward Hunt Island (Canada).

In 2011 Konyukhov fulfilled an expedition cross Ethiopia, covering more than 1000 km of route.

== Explorers Grand Slam ==
Fyodor is the first Russian mountaineer to complete the Seven Summits challenge for which a person must climb the highest mountains of each of the seven continents, also he is the first Russian traveller and third person in the world, who completed The Explorers Grand Slam: he also visited both the North Pole and the South Pole.

- 1992 (26 February) — Mount Elbrus (Europe/Russia)
- 1992 (14 May) — Mount Everest (Asia) — (in the AvtoVAZ team)
- 1995 (26 July) — Mont Blanc (Europe)
- 1996 (19 January) — Vinson Massif (Antarctica)
- 1996 (9 March) — Aconcagua (South America)
- 1997 (18 February) — Mount Kilimanjaro (Africa)
- 1997 (17 April) — Mount Kosciuszko (Australia)
- 1997 (26 May) — Denali (North America) — (in the team)
- 1999 (18 September) — Puncak Jaya (Oceania)

On 19 May 2012 - Fyodor Konyukhov together with the Russian team "7 Summits" reached the top of Mount Everest. His climbing route was via the Northern Ridge (Tibet). This expedition was devoted to the 20th anniversary of the first Russian ascent of Mount Everest (via the Southern Col) – May 1992.

== Awards ==
- Order of Friendship of Peoples.
