= Jin Feibao =

Chinese mountain climber

Jin Feibao 金飞豹
- Born: 23 November 1963 (age 62); Kunming, China
- Occupations: Climber, Adventurer, and Business Consultant
- Known for: Completing the Explorers Grand Slam in only 18 months and 24 days

Jin Feibao (Chinese: 金飞豹; pinyin: Jīn Feībào, born 23 November 1963) is a Chinese mountaineer. He has been described as "arguably modern China's greatest adventurer". A native from Kunming, Feibao has completed the Explorers Grand Slam, summiting the highest mountain in every continent and reaching both the North and South Poles in a record 18 months and 24 days. He has also trekked across the Sahara Desert and took part in the first Chinese expedition to cross Greenland from West to East. On top of his many explorations, he is also a celebrated stamp collector, having collected the Guinness Book of World Records largest Olympic stamp collection, and the largest collection of stamps featuring birds. His recent achievement is the Fairyland 100 Marathon, he successfully finished a big challenge - to run 100 marathons in 100 consecutive days in 100 beautiful countryside places in Yunnan, Southeast China.

== Explorers Grand Slam ==
On 14 May 2006, Jin Feibao, along with his brother Jin Feibiao (Chinese: 金飞彪; pinyin: Jīn Feībiāo), became the first brothers to summit Mount Everest together. At the summit they flew the Chinese flag along with the Olympic flag to show their support of the upcoming 2008 Beijing Olympics. After summiting Everest, Feibao continued to climb the highest mountain in each of the seven continents as well as trek to the North and South Poles, raising the Olympic flag at each site. On 8 December 2007, summited Mount Aconcagua in South America becoming the fastest person to complete the Explorers Grand Slam in just under 19 months.

Feibao's Completion of the 7+2 Explorers Grand Slam
	Date	Place	Elevation	Description
1.	2006 May 14	Mount Everest	8848 m	Highest Mountain in Asia and the World
2.	2006 October 20	Mount Kilimanjaro	5895 m	Highest Mountain in Africa
3.	2006 December 23	Mount Vinson Massif	4897 m	Highest Mountain in Antarctica
4.	2007 January 19	Geographic South Pole	2835 m	Trekked to 90°S Latitude
5.	2007 April 28	Geographic North Pole		Trekked to 90°N Latitude
6.	2007 May 26	Mount Kosciuszko	2228 m	Highest Mountain in Australia
7.	2007 June 30	Mount McKinley	6194 m	Highest Mountain in North America
8.	2007 28 August 2007	Mount Elbrus	5642 m	Highest Mountain in Europe
9.	2007 September 9	Carstensz Pyramid	4884 m	Highest Mountain in Oceania
10.	2007 December 8	Mount Aconcagua	6962 m	Highest Mountain in South America

== Exhibitions ==
In 2004, in collaboration with American Gregg Millett, Feibao hosted the exhibition "1944: Colorful Kunming" which featured the oldest known color photographs ever taken in China, some 200 color slides taken by a US Army Lieutenant in World War II. The exhibition was an immediate hit. It was free to the public and over 300,000 people attended in the two weeks that it was on display. The exhibition put Feibao in the city spotlight, and he used the popularity of the exhibition to jump start his adventures and fulfill his passions.

25 April 2008: Organize "A hundred years of Olympic Games" – 2008 Kunming "Olympic Spirit" World collected Olympic stamps exhibition.

20 July 2008: Organize "A hundred years of Yunnan Baiyao Co., Polar expedition"—2008 "The first Chinese trekking through Greenland Icecap in North Pole" photo exhibition.

== Other activities ==
From 30 January to 5 February 2018: took part in 2018 World Marathon Challenge, run seven marathons of seven continents all over the world.

From 29 May to 26 August 2018: successfully finished the challenge "Fairyland 100 Marathon" - run 100 marathons in 100 consecutive days in 100 beautiful countryside places in Yunnan, Southeast China.

== Marathon and cross-country races ==
- 31 October 2010: Athens Classic Marathon
- 26 February 2012: Tokyo Marathon
- June 2012: Lanzhou Marathon
- 24 November 2012: Beijing Marathon
- 2 December 2012: Shanghai Marathon
- 5 January 2013: Xiamen Marathon
- 15 April 2013: Boston Marathon
- 1 June – 8 June 2013: 4 Deserts Gobi March
- 29 September 2013: BMW Berlin Marathon 2013
- 9 October to December, 2013: New York Marathon, Chicago Marathon, Columbia Marathon, Atlantic Marathon
- 1 December 2013: Standard Chartered Singapore Marathon 2013
- 10 to 24 February 2014: 4 Deserts Saraha Race
- 21 March 2014: Seoul International Marathon
- 21 April 2014: Took part in and successfully finished 2014 Boston Marathon.
- 15 May – 2 June 2014: Took part in and successfully finished Tenzing Hillary Everest Marathon in Nepal.
- 8 June 2014: Took part in and successfully finished Laguna Phuket international Marathon in Thailand.
- 6 July 2014: finished Golden Coast Airport Marathon in Australia.
- 28 August – 7 September 2014: Took part in and successfully finished RacingThePlanet Madagascar 2014, 250 km, 7 days, self-supported endurance footrace.
- 5 October – 12 October 2014: Took part in and successfully finished Atacama Crossing 2014, 250 km, 7 days, self-supported tough footrace, one of the 4 Deserts Series of RacingThePlanet.
- 1 November – 11 November 2014: Took part in and successfully finished The Last Desert (Antarctic) 2014, 250 km, 7 days, self-supported tough footrace, one of the 4 Deserts Series of RacingThePlanet.
- 26 April 2015: Took part in and successfully finished London Marathon.
- 18 November 2015: Took part in and successfully finished Marathon International du Beaujolais in France.
- 18 December 2015: Took part in and successfully finished Chiang Mai Marathon in Thailand.
- December 2015: over two years endeavor, Jin Feibao completed the extreme marathons of seven continents, which made him the first person who completed the Explorers Grand Slam and the marathons of all continents.
- March 2016: Took part in and successfully finished Bhutan Marathon.
- 16 April 2016: Took part in and successfully finished Saipan Marathon
- 1 May 2016: Took part in and successfully finished Borneo International Marathon in Malaysia.
- 29 May 2016: Took part in and successfully finished Rio de Janeiro International Marathon in Brazil.
- 30 January 2018 to 5 February: took part in 2018 World Marathon Challenge, run seven marathons of seven continents all over the world, and finally completed the world challenge with the best result of "China’s Team of Dream"

== Awards and honors ==
- Olympic Torch bearer, 11 June 2008
- Awarded China's Golden Rhinoceros Outdoor Award, 2006, 2007
