= Pythom =

Swedish-American aerospace company

Pythom Inc.

- Company type: Privately held company
- Industry: Aerospace; Commercial spaceflight
- Founded: 2020; 5 years ago
- Founder: Tina Sjögren; Tom Sjögren
- Headquarters: Bishop, California
- Website: https://pythom.space

Pythom (doing business as Pythom Inc.) is a Swedish-American aerospace company based in Bishop, California. Pythom was founded in 2020 by software engineers and professional explorers Tina Sjögren and Tom Sjögren. The company is currently in development of a complete human-rated space transportation system, including rockets, landers and spaceships for Earth, Mars, the Moon and asteroids.

Pythom has announced public aspirations of going to Mars within the end of this decade.

== History ==
Pythom was founded in 2020 by the married couple Tina Sjögren (CEO) and Tom Sjögren (CTO). With a background in exploration, the two were awarded a combined four Guinness world records. The couple summited Mount Everest as expedition leaders in 1999, skied unsupported from the edge of Antarctica to the South Pole in 2001-2002, and from Canada to the North Pole also in 2002.

As part of their expeditions, the couple invented lightweight satellite communication software and hardware solutions, which later turned into a business with customers including NASA, NGOs, defense units, and extreme explorers.

In 2020 Pythom joined the DARPA Launch Challenge as one of 55 teams to design a rocket that could launch "anytime, from anywhere". Pythom's Eiger rocket was selected as one of ten finalists, before the competition ultimately closed with no winner.

Pythom was established later that year, in 2020, to build first the Eiger rocket and then a complete space transportation system for human exploration of the Solar System. The space fleet is designed around successful principles from early Earth exploration: low cost, light travel, small and agile teams.

Pythom received seed funding from a Swedish special investment vehicle team of investors named Space Cowboys. The group was specifically created to invest in the startup and has since doubled in size.

In March 2022, Pythom conducted a hold-down test of the first stage of the Eiger rocket. Following this test, the company received backlash from industry professionals for their lack of safety precautions. Pythom dismissed these concerns, claiming that since its start in 2020, and during two years of propulsion test activities, it has a clean personnel and environmental safety record.

Pythom's main development facilities are in Bishop, California.

== Hardware ==
=== Black Magic Propulsion System ===
Pythom rockets and space fleet are designed around storable propellants and a proprietary propulsion system that supports entire space missions, without the need to change technologies. Pythom's Black Magic cyclic pressure system has been tested to 10 MPa chamber pressure, twice the previous record in the small launch segment (<100–500 kg to LEO), and a magnitude greater than the Apollo lunar lander.

=== Asterex Engine ===
Pythom's Asterex 12 kN double-walled regeneratively cooled rocket engine is designed to operate through entire space missions. Mathematically designed and additively manufactured in Inconel.

The name "Asterex" is a false portmanteau of "astro" (star) and "rex" (king), plus a tribute to cartoon persona Asterix from the comic book series The Adventures of Asterix.

=== Eiger Rocket ===
Named after the famous mountain in Switzerland, Eiger is Pythom's first orbital launch vehicle that is currently under development. Eiger is designed to carry 150 kg to low Earth orbit, for a total cost of $1.2 million.

Selected as one of ten finalists in the DARPA launch challenge, Eiger is designed to launch anytime from anywhere with minimal infrastructure.

Eiger's first stage is equipped with a cluster of nine Asterex engines, and the second stage operates with a single Asterex vacuum engine. Both stages are powered by storable propellants that ignite naturally, nitric acid (HNO_{3}) as the oxidizer and furfuryl alcohol (C_{5}H_{6}O_{2}) as fuel. The furfuryl alcohol fuel is also carbon neutral and is regarded a green propellant.

=== Kang Rocket ===
Following Eiger completion, the larger Kang rocket, named after the world's third highest mountain Kangchenjunga, is designed to be 30 m tall, and carry 4,000 kg to low Earth orbit. Kang is also designed to be a human-rated launch vehicle.

=== Olympus Lander ===
Powered by the Black Magic propulsion system and a cluster of five Asterex engines, Olympus is designed to transport humans and cargo between a spaceship and foreign bodies such as planets, moons and asteroids. The vehicle is currently under development.

Olympus is named after the largest and highest mountain in the solar system, Olympus Mons on Mars.

=== Pythom Spaceship ===
Pythom is a conceptual design of a spaceship assembled from used upper stages of the Eiger and Kang rockets in Earth orbit. The spaceship rotates for artificial gravity, and will be able to simulate different gravitational environments based on the length and therefore the speed of its spokes.

Sharing its name with the company itself, the Pythom spaceship is named after the comet that ancient Egyptians believed to have brought life to Earth.
