= Kang Ki-seok =

South Korean mountaineer (1978–2011)

- 강기석
- Born: September 10, 1978; Andong
- Disappeared: October 18, 2011 (age 33); Annapurna
- Citizenship: Korean
- Education: Andong National University
- Occupations: Alpinist, Manager of a mountaineering gear distributor
- Years active: 2003–2011
- Known for: Mountaineering, climbing partner of Park Young-seok
- Notable work: First ascent, Korean Route on Mount Everest
- Height: 170 cm (5 ft 7 in)
- Awards: 'Alumni Who Made the Alma Mater Shine', Andong National University
- Honours: Order of Merit (3rd class)

Kang Ki-seok (Korean: 강기석; September 10, 1978 – October 18, 2011) was a South Korean mountaineer. Kang helped forge a new route on Mount Everest and was considered one of Korea's most promising mountaineers of his generation.

== Biography ==
Kang Ki-seok was the eldest of two sons and one daughter, born to a family from Andong, Korea. In 1997, Kang Ki-seok entered Andong National University. There, he joined the university Mountaineering Club and began climbing in the Himalayas in 2003. While training with the club, Kang would regularly make practice climbs on Bukhansan. In 2004, he led a student expedition to climb Denali, and then went to explore the mountain regions of western China.

In 2006, Kang Ki-seok graduated from the Department of Mechanical Engineering. That year, he made his first attempt on the south face of Lhotse, where he was hit by rockfall and injured. He climbed down to base camp, rested for two weeks and then tried another attempt at the summit. He had to descend after reaching the final camp before the summit.

Kang was known for his love of the mountains and dedication to the people he would meet on his overseas climbing expeditions. After graduation, he joined the Goldwin Korea Alpine Challenge Team, devoting the next few years to climbing expeditions to Lhotse, Gasherbrum II and Denali with the team.

=== Korean route on Everest ===
In 2008, Kang made his first attempt on Mount Everest with new climbing partner Shin Dong-min. After getting frostbite above Camp 4, Kang had to abandon his summit attempt. The next year, in May 2009, Shin Dong-min and Kang joined with Park Young-seok to make the first successful ascent of the "Korean Route" on the southwest face of Everest. When asked by a reporter what book he brought on his climb, Kang replied, Walden by Henry David Thoreau.

=== First Annapurna attempt ===
In 2010, Korean alpinist Park Young-seok organized an alpine-style attempt on an unclimbed line in Annapurna between two pillars established by previous British and Japanese expeditions. That year, Kang Ki-seok accompanied Park on an attempt at Annapurna. It was unsuccessful, and the climbers vowed to return the next year. During the climb, Kang Ki-seok was hit by a human-sized boulder, injuring his knee. After resting at basecamp for a few days, he had to be airlifted to Kathmandu, and then flown to Korea for surgery for a torn tendon. After recovery, he quickly returned to climbing.

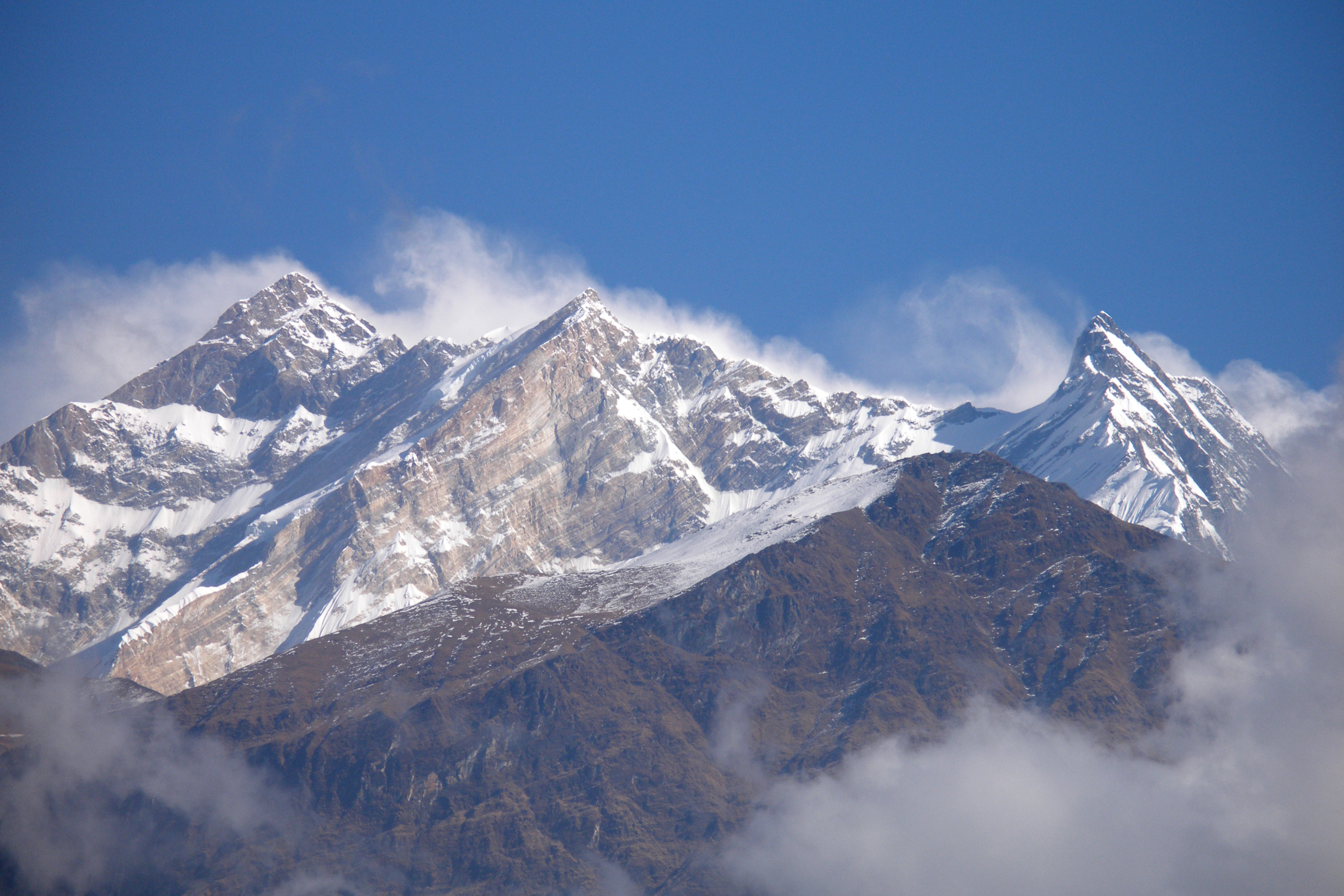
The Annapurna massif, the destination of Kang's final climb

=== Final climb ===
In 2011, Kang and expedition partners Park Young-seok and Shin Dong-min returned to Annapurna's south face in an attempt to pioneer the 'Korea New Route'. Kang travelled to Nepal without telling his parents about the expedition. The team chose to climb in October, which is considered late in the season, in an attempt to avoid avalanches and rockfalls. On October 18, the group lost contact and went missing on the mountain.

The Korean Alpine Federation dispatched a rescue team of five Koreans and fourteen Sherpas in an expansive attempt to rescue them. The rescue effort later had to be dissolved weeks later due to weather conditions on the mountain. According to reports by local Sherpas, there was evidence of an avalanche and a cut rope, suggesting either a rockfall or avalanche had trapped the climbers.

=== Aftermath ===
A commemorative Mountaineer's joint funeral was held at Seoul National University Hospital's Funeral Hall by the Korea Alpine Federation with all domestic mountaineering organizations participating and hundreds of mourners in attendance. It was the first time the organization had organized such an event. Kang was posthumously awarded the Order of Sports Merit, third class, Geojang Medal by the Ministry of Culture, Sports and Tourism.

At the time of Kang's death, he had plans to climb Makalu's west face (8,463m) and create a new route on the south face of Lhotse.

In 2012, a new expedition organized by the Korean Alpine Federation returned to search for the missing climbers. No trace of the missing climbers has been found. A subsequent expedition in 2016 was again unsuccessful.

In 2016, Kang Ki-seok was posthumously honored with the 'Alumni Who Made the Alma Mater Shine' award by the Andong National University Alumni Association. That year, a documentary was released, covering a memorial climb to Annapurna by the family members of the missing climbers.

== Expeditions ==
- 2003: West Face of Lhotse (8,516m)
- 2004: Denali · Korea Alpine Federation Youth Wilderness Exploration Team (Western China) · Baekdu-daegan Crossing (24 days)
- 2005: Joshua Tree, the three major north faces of the Alps: Eiger (3,970m), Matterhorn (4,478m), Grande Jorasses (4,205m), and Aiguille du Dru (3,754)
- 2006: South Face of Lhotse (8,516m)
- 2008: Gasherbrum II (8,035m)
- 2008: South West Face of Everest (8,848m)
- 2009: Everest (8,848m) South West Face Korean New Route
- 2010: Annapurna, abandoned at 6100m due to weather
- 2011: Annapurna

Order of Sports Merit Geosang (3rd Class) ribbon

== Awards ==
- Order of Sports Merit, Geosang Medal (Giant Elephant) 거상장
