= Tarka L'Herpiniere =

British explorer, athlete, speaker, and filmmaker

- Born: 19 September 1981; Yeovil, England, United Kingdom
- Occupations: explorer, athlete, motivational speaker, filmmaker
- Known for: Ultra Endurance World First Expeditions
- Website: primaljourney.com

Tarka Michel Bernard L'Herpiniere (born 19 September 1981) is a British explorer, ultra-endurance athlete, motivational speaker, and filmmaker who holds several endurance records.

L'Herpiniere spent his early years climbing, skiing, skydiving, paragliding and BASE jumping before turning his hand to large-scale expeditions. Initially, these were mountaineering expeditions including Mont Blanc, Aconcagua, and Cho Oyu before developing an interest in the polar regions. In 2004, after several successful small scale expeditions to the Arctic, he attempted to become the youngest person ever to reach the North and South Poles, unaided and in succession, but due to sponsorship withdrawal, the project could not be completed.

In 2006, he attempted to summit Mount Everest without oxygen. At the North Col (7,020 m) L'Herpiniere developed HACE and had to be evacuated. In 2007, he, along with his now wife, became the first person to walk the entire length of the Great Wall of China.

In 2008, L'Herpiniere cycled over 8,000 km through Africa on a 30-year-old bicycle with no brakes or gears to promote the charity Re-Cycle. In 2009, he completed the longest crossing of the Southern Patagonian Ice Cap by a British team.

In 2014, L'Herpiniere, along with Ben Saunders, replicated Captain Robert Falcon Scott's 1,795 mile trek across Antarctica from Scott's cabin on the coast, to the South Pole, and back.

== Background and history ==
L'Herpiniere was born in Yeovil, England shortly before moving to Tignes in the French Alps. He is the eldest of three siblings and returned to England to be educated at Cheltenham College after obtaining a sports scholarship. In 1996, he was awarded a scholarship to the Royal Military Academy Sandhurst before attending Brunel University and the University of Bath.

He is a fellow of the Royal Geographical Society, a mentor of the British Schools Exploring Society and has used his expeditions to support a number of charities including: Make-A-Wish Foundation, Cancer Research, Practical Action, Merlin, and Re-Cycle.

== Marriage ==
He was married to Katie-Jane (Cooper) L'Herpiniere. They became engaged during an aborted attempt to cross the Patagonian ice cap from north to south unaided in 2009. She was also his companion on his trek across the Great Wall of China. Now divorced.

== Expeditions ==
Year	Expedition
1995	His first summit of Mont Blanc (aged 13 or 14).
1997	Cycled 1000 miles from Cheltenham to Nice, France (aged 16).
1999	Ran 8 marathons in 8 consecutive days down the west coast of France carrying all his equipment.
	4-man team to summit Mont Blanc.
2001	35-day expedition to the North / East coast of Svalbard.
	Winter mountaineering expedition to the Andes.
2002	Expedition Leader of a 23-day expedition to Cornwallis Island.
2003	Solo expedition to Devon Island.
	Solo Svalbard expedition.
2004	Solo 27-day expedition to Russia.
2005	Unsuccessful Bi-Polar expedition.
	Unsupported crossing of the Alps from France to Switzerland.
	Climbing expedition up Mont Blanc in training for Mount Everest.
2006	Climbing member of EverestMax; The longest climb on earth. From the shores of the Dead Sea in Jordan (−400m) to the summit of Mount Everest (8848m).
2007	4500 km trek through the Taklimakan Desert and over the Qiling Mountain range to walk the entire length of the Great Wall of China.
2008	2-man expedition off the North / East coast of Spitsbergen.
	8000 km cycle expedition from Djibouti to South Africa.
2009	Polar research and support station as part of the Catlin Arctic Survey.
	Completed longest British crossing of the Southern Patagonian Ice cap during the Rivers of Ice Expedition.
2014	Completed 1,800 mile trek from the Antarctic coast to the South Pole and back, with Ben Saunders

== Expedition filmmaker ==
Year	Film	Release	Ref
2008	The Great Walk of China	February 2009 release	
2009	The African Way	February 2010 release	
2010	Rivers of Ice	November 2010 release	

== See also ==
- List of Antarctic expeditions
