= Ryan Waters =

American mountaineer

Ryan Waters is an American mountaineer, mountaineering guide, and polar skiing guide.

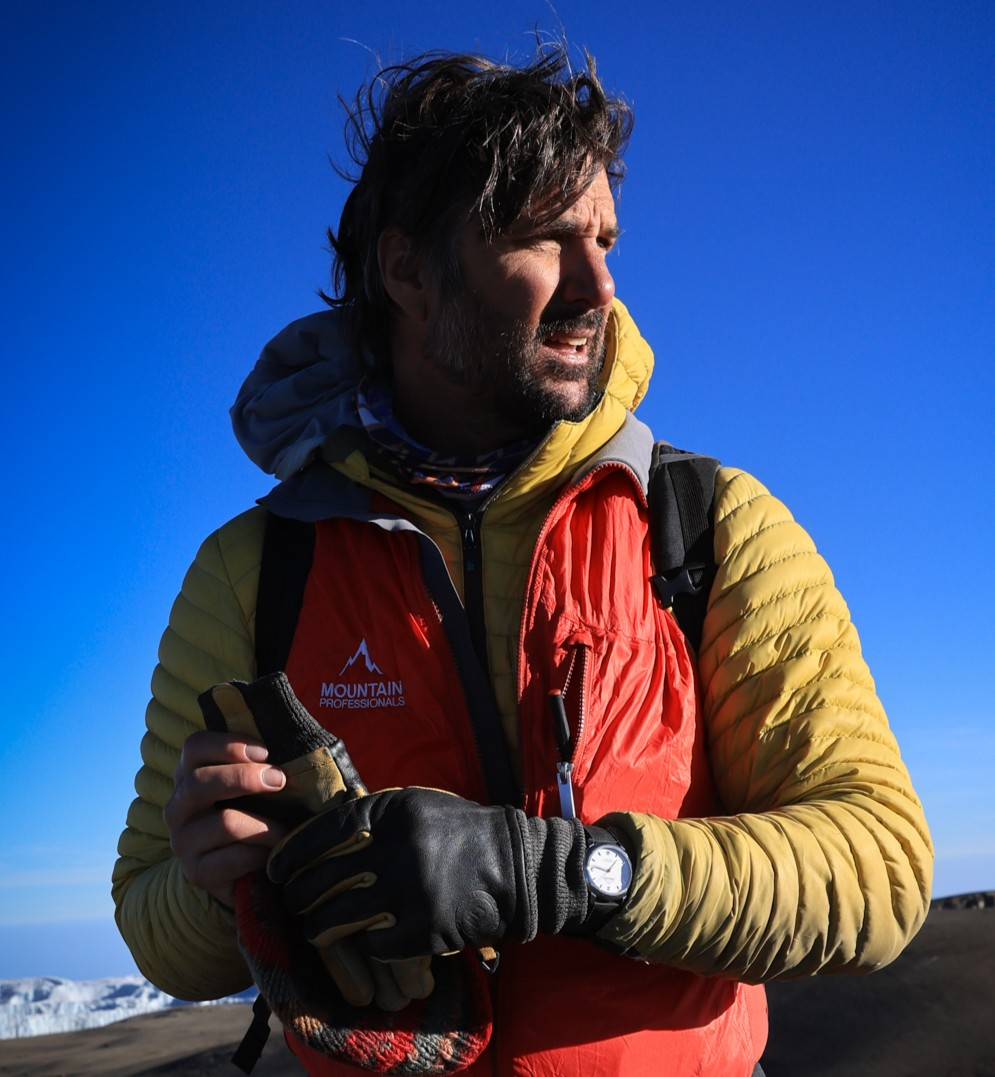
Ryan Waters on Kilimanjaro 2023

He owns and operates Mountain Professionals, a guiding company based in Colorado, United States.

In 2014, he became the second American to complete the Adventurers' Grand Slam, by climbing the Seven Summits and skiing coast to pole, unsupported / unassisted trips to the North and South Poles.. He has also summited Mount Everest nine times.

In January 2010, Ryan and Cecilie Skog completed a ski traverse of Antarctica. The team skied 1,117 miles/1,800 kilometers over 70 days from Berkner Island in the Filchner-Ronne Ice Shelf to the South Pole, then continued to the Ross Sea, completing the first ski traverse of Antarctica to the Ross Ice Shelf without resupplies or the use of kites. Waters' Antarctic expedition was recognized by Guinness World Records for being the youngest male to complete an unsupported overland crossing of Antarctica.

He and fellow explorer Eric Larsen reached the North Pole on May 4, 2014 after skiing unsupported for 53 days from Cape Discovery, Canada. This expedition was made into a 2-hour documentary titled Melting: Last Race to the Pole, for Animal Planet television network.

In September 2015, Waters and Larsen made the first ascent of 6,166 m Jabou Ri in the Rolwaling region of Nepal.

In 2016, Ryan guided 3 clients on an unsupported full length ski trip to the South Pole via the Messner/Fuchs route over a 44-day expedition. This is thought to be only the second time that a full-length unsupported expedition has been guided taking clients to the South Pole. And again in 2019, he guided two clients on a full-length unsupported South Pole ski trip from the Hercules Inlet start on Antarctica.

Ryan is the author of the 2022 autobiographical book An American's Grand Slam: A True Adventurer's Unlikely Journey, which he wrote with coauthor Hudson Lindenberger.

== See also ==
- List of Mount Everest summiters by number of times to the summit
- Explorers Grand Slam
