= Three Poles Challenge =

Adventure challenge for North and South Pole, and Everest

The Three Poles

The Three Poles is an adventurer’s challenge to reach the North Pole, the South Pole, and the summit of Mount Everest.

The first person to reach all three locations was Edmund Hillary. Hillary summited Everest in May 1953, reached the South Pole in January 1958, and made it to the North Pole in company with Neil Armstrong in April 1985. Hillary flew to the North Pole.

The first person to complete the challenge entirely on foot was Erling Kagge. Kagge completed the Three Poles Challenge by May 1994, six months faster than the next person. On 5 August 1997, Antoine de Choudens (France, 1969–2009) became the only climber to accomplish the Three Poles Challenge on foot without using supplementary oxygen on the Everest climb. Tina Sjögren became the first woman to complete the challenge in 2002.

Colin O'Brady became the fastest person to complete the Three Poles Challenge in May 2016, setting the current record in 131 days as part of his successful attempt to break the Seven Summits and Explorers Grand Slam (Last Degree) (Note: Also known as The Adventurers Grand Slam — the Three Poles plus the Seven Summits) speed records. However, unlike Erling Kagge, Antoine de Choudens, and Tina Sjögren, Colin O’Brady only completed the Last Degree of the North Pole.

Masha Gordon became the fastest woman to complete the Three Poles Challenge in 2016, beating a record set by Wang Lei in May 2010.

== See also ==
- Eight-thousander
- Seven Summits
- Seven Second Summits
- Seven Third Summits
- Explorer's Grand Slam
- Volcanic Seven Summits
- Four Poles Challenge
- Eight Summits
