= Explorer's Grand Slam =

Adventurering goal of Earth's Poles and Seven Summits

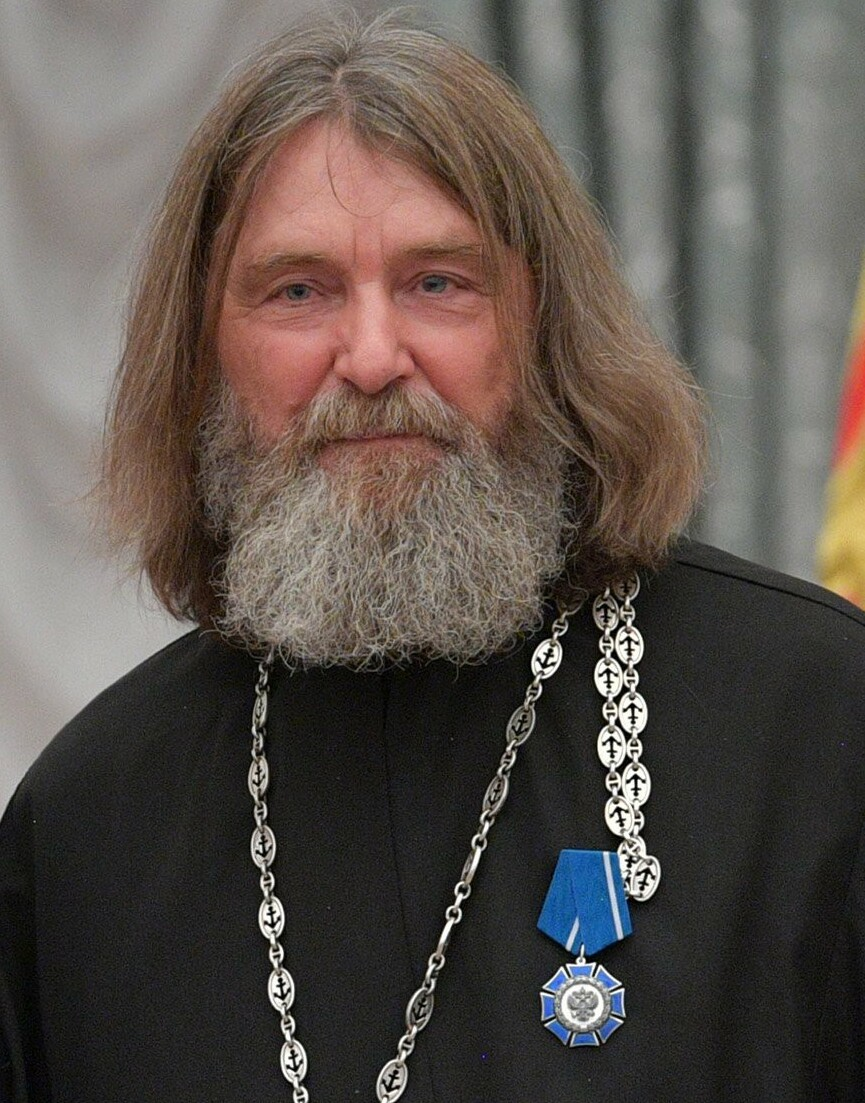
In 1997, Fyodor Konyukhov became the second person to complete the Explorer's Grand Slam, the first Russian to do so, and the first individual to complete both the Bass and Messner lists.

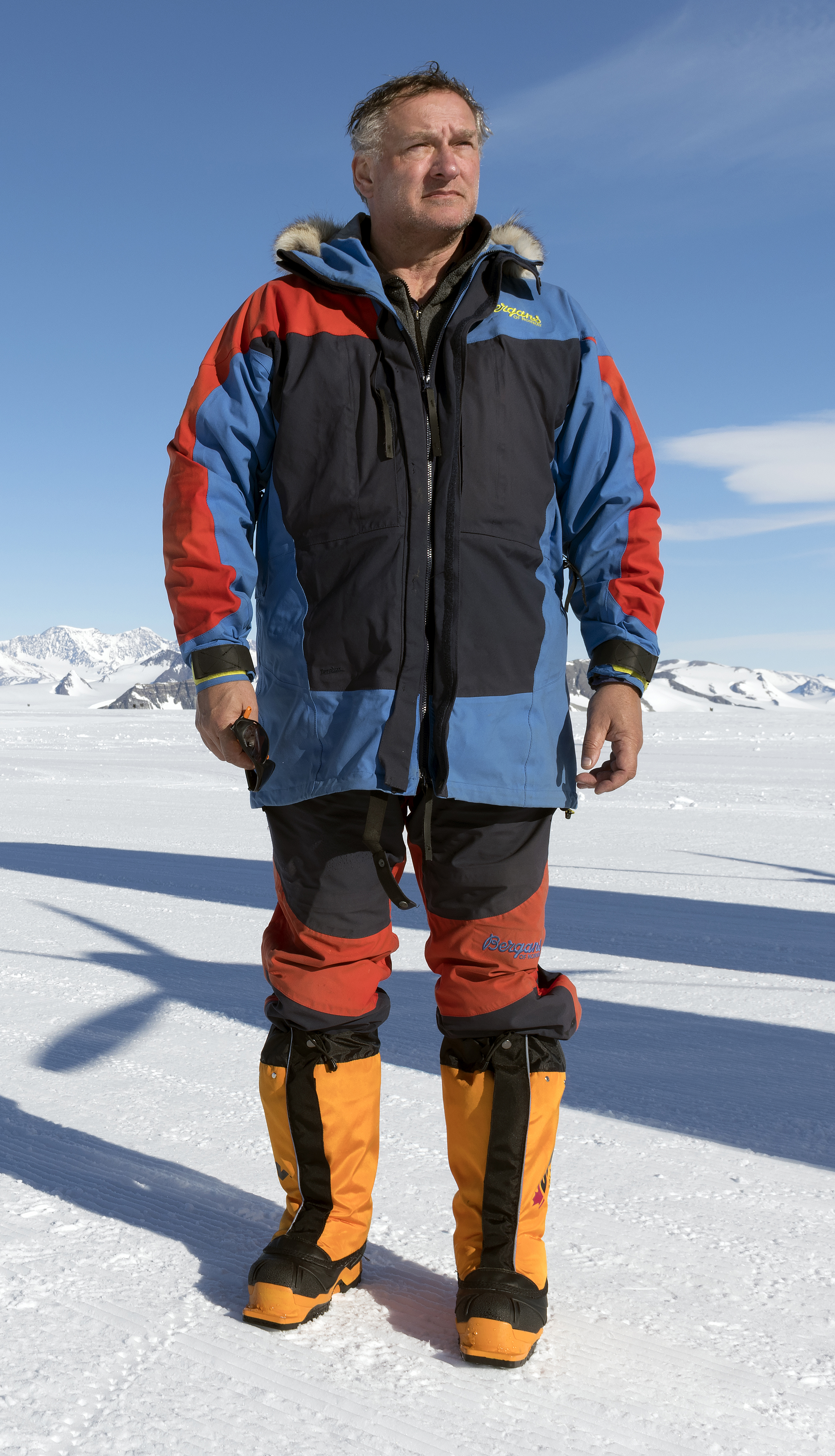
Sir David Hempleman-Adams standing in Antarctica in 2018. In 1998 he became the first British person to complete an Explorer's Grand Slam.

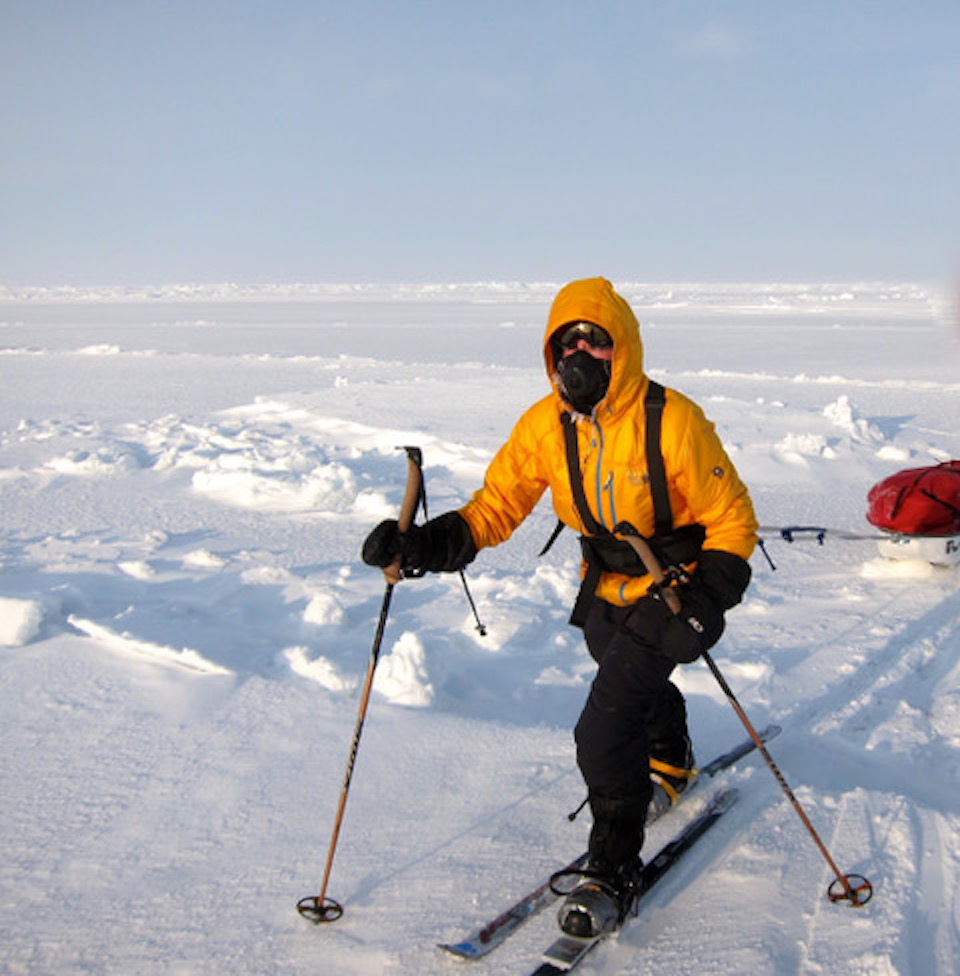
Vanessa O'Brien skiing the last degree to the North Pole as part of the Explorer's Grand Slam in 2013. She was the first woman to complete the Last Degree in under one year.

The Explorer's Grand Slam, also known as the Adventurer's Grand Slam, is an adventurer goal to reach the North Pole and South Pole, as well as climb the Seven Summits: Everest, Aconcagua, Denali, Kilimanjaro, Elbrus, Vinson, and Puncak Jaya or Kosciuszko. The reason for a choice of Puncak Jaya or Kosciuszko was to give Explorer's Grand Slam participants a choice in following the Bass List (Kosciuszko) or the Messner List (Puncak Jaya) when choosing their seventh summit; for more information see paragraph entitled Controversy in Eight Summits.

Heo Young-Ho (1954-2025), a South Korean alpinist, was the first person to complete the Explorer's Grand Slam, after he reached the South Pole from Berkner Island in January 1997. British Explorer, David Hempleman-Adams, unaware of Heo Young-Ho's achievements, claimed he was the first person, but this has proven to be incorrect. The top three to complete the Explorer's Grand Slam are: first, Heo Young-Ho, South Korean Alpinist, finishing with the South Pole in January 1997, second, Russian Survivalist Fyodor Konyukhov finishing with Denali in May 1997, and third, David Hempleman-Adams finishing with the geographic North Pole in 1998.

== History ==
The original concept involved the polar trips starting from accepted coastal points, involving long sledging journeys. Over time the significantly shorter, easier, and less serious "Last Degree" polar trips – from 89 degrees to the pole (at 90 degrees) – have been claimed as the Explorer's Grand Slam (Last Degree). The climbing community, the American Alpine Club, The Explorers Club, climbing companies such as International Mountain Guides, define the Explorer's Grand Slam as having accomplished the Seven Summits plus (at a minimum – the last degree of) the North and South Poles. There is some consensus that a True Explorer's Grand Slam means one will also have summited all 14 peaks above 8,000 metres (26,247 ft) (14 + 7 + 2). Likewise, there is some consensus that a True Adventurer's Grand Slam is achieved by also visiting the magnetic north and south poles.

As of 2022, all terminology and guidelines regarding polar data records are being conducted under the Polar Expeditions Classification Scheme (PECS).

In April 2005, Park Young-seok became the first person to complete a True Explorer's Grand Slam (South Korea).

In December, 2005, Stuart Smith of Waco, Texas, became the first American to complete an Explorer's Grand Slam.

In 2011, former Wales rugby union international Richard Parks became the first person to complete the (Last Degree) Grand Slam within a single calendar year, doing so within seven months.

On April 16, 2013, Vanessa O'Brien became the first woman to complete the (Last Degree) Grand Slam under a single calendar year, doing so in eleven months.

On April 22, 2013, Cheryl Bart became the first Australian woman and the 31st person worldwide to complete the Explorer's Grand Slam.

In 2014, Jing Wang became the fastest woman to complete the (Last Degree) Grand Slam in 142 days.

In 2014, Ryan Waters became the second American to complete the True Adventurer's Grand Slam by skiing full-length, unsupported and unassisted North and South Pole expeditions and climbing the seven summits.

On May 27, 2016, Colin O'Brady became the fastest person to complete the Explorer's Grand Slam (Last Degree), doing so in 139 days.

On April 12, 2017, Marin Minamiya became the youngest person to complete the Explorers' Grand Slam (Last Degree) at 20 years old.

== People who completed the quest ==
=== Full Grand Slam (both poles from an outer coastline/shore) ===
In chronological order:

1. Heo Young-ho (South Korea)
2. Fyodor Konyukhov (Russia)
3. David Hempleman-Adams (United Kingdom)
4. Park Young-seok (South Korea)
5. Bernard Voyer (Canada)
6. Cecilie Skog (Norway)
7. Maxime Chaya (Lebanon)
8. Stuart Smith (United States)
9. Ryan Waters (United States)
10. Johan Ernst Nilson (Sweden)
11. Wilco van Rooijen (Netherlands)
12. François Bernard (France)

=== Grand Slam (one pole from an inner coastline/shore and one pole from an outer coastline/shore or last degree) ===
In chronological order:

1. Haraldur Örn Ólafsson (SP non-Coastal) (Iceland)
2. Khoo Swee Chiow (SP non-Coastal) (Singapore)
3. Arnold Witzig (Switzerland) (Canada)
4. Alison Levine (mountain climber) (NP non-Coastal) (United States)
5. Mostafa Salameh (NP non-Coastal) (Jordan)
6. Newall Hunter (NP non-Coastal) (United Kingdom)
7. Zhang Liang (SP non-Coastal) (China)
8. Grazyna Machnik (NP non-Coastal) (United Kingdom, Poland)
9. Jaco Ottink (NP non-Coastal) (Netherlands)
10. Jérôme Brisebourg (NP non-Coastal) (France)
11. Mark Shuttleworth (NP non-Coastal) (United Kingdom)
12. Inge Meløy (NP non-Coastal) (Norway)

=== Last Degree Grand Slam (both poles from 89 degrees) ===
In chronological order:

1. Sean Disney (South Africa)
2. Vaughan de la Harpe (South Africa)
3. Sibusiso Vilane (South Africa)
4. Arthur Marsden (South Africa)
5. Andrew Van Der Velde (South Africa)
6. Vernon Tejas (United States)
7. Will Cross (United States)
8. Lei Wang (United States, China)
9. Neil Laughton (United Kingdom)
10. Jo Gambi (United Kingdom)
11. Rob Gambi (Australia)
12. Randall Peeters (United States)
13. Wang Yongfeng (China)
14. Ci Luo (China)
15. Liu Jian (China)
16. Wang Shi (China)
17. Zhong Jianmin (China)
18. Jin Feibao (China)
19. Wang Qiuyang (China)
20. Suzanne K Nance (United States)
21. Richard Parks (United Kingdom)
22. Andrea Cardona (Guatemala)
23. John Dahlem (United States)
24. Matthew Holt (United Kingdom)
25. Len Stanmore (Canada)
26. Cheryl Bart (Australia)
27. Vanessa O'Brien (United States, United Kingdom)
28. Sebastian Merriman (United Kingdom)
29. Jing Wang (China)
30. Tashi Malik (India)
31. Nungshi Malik (India)
32. Omar Samra (Egypt)
33. Maria (Masha) Gordon (United Kingdom, Russia)
34. Colin O'Brady (United States)
35. John Moorhouse (United Kingdom)
36. Victor Vescovo (United States)
37. Sean Swarner (United States)
38. Marin Minamiya (Japan)
39. Michael W. Grigsby (United States)
40. Julia Elinor Schultz (Germany)
41. Muhamad Muqharabbin Mokhtarrudin (Malaysia)
42. Mike Gibbons (United States)
43. Nikolaos Mangitsis (Greece)
44. Josu Feijoo (Spain)
45. James Holliday (United States)
46. Joel Schauer (United States)
47. Alexander Pancoe (United States)
48. Leifur Örn Svavarsson (Iceland)
49. Khai Nguyen (Canada) (United States)
50. Taylor Sweitzer (United States)
51. Frank Fumich (United States)

== See also ==
- Grand Slam (golf)
- Grand Slam (tennis)
- Ocean Explorers Grand Slam
