= Tina Sjögren =

American explorer

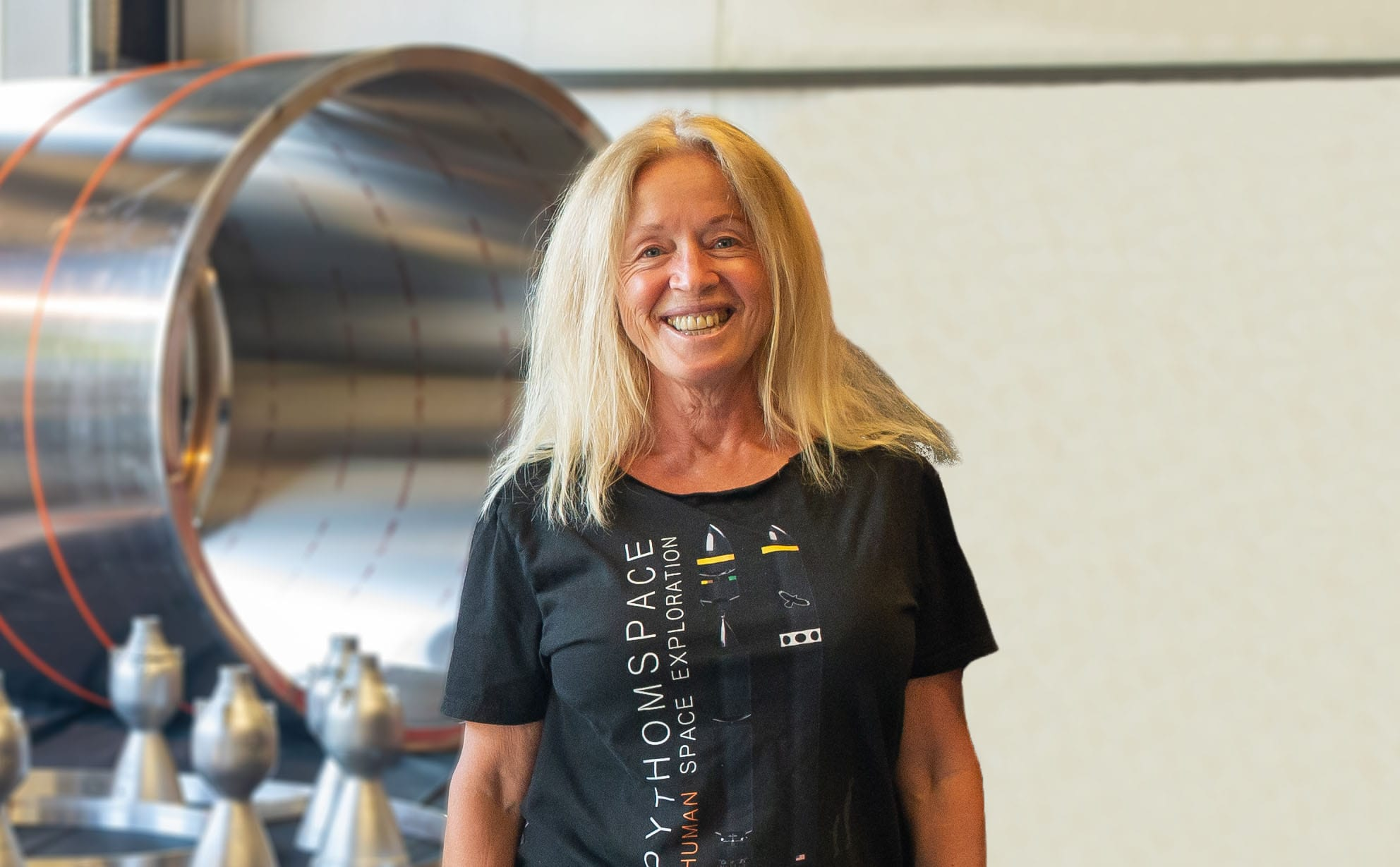
- Born: May 26, 1959 (age 67); Prague, Czechoslovakia
- Citizenship: United States, Sweden
- Title: CEO and co-founder of Pythom
- Spouse: Tom Sjogren (married 1983-present)
- Awards: First unsupported journey to the South Pole (female), First unsupported journey to the North Pole (female), First female to complete the Three Poles Challenge, Fastest time to reach both Poles unsupported

Tina Sjögren is the CEO and co-founder of Pythom, a Swedish-American aerospace company based in Bishop, California. She is the first woman to complete the Three Poles Challenge - summiting Mount Everest (1999) and skiing unsupported to the South Pole (2001-2002) and North Pole (2002).

== Early life ==
Tina Sjögren was born in Prague, Czechoslovakia, on 26 May 1959. At age 9, she left the country with her mother and brother as political refugees. She ended up in Sweden, where she met the Swedish competitive sailor and figure skater Tom Sjögren, at the Stockholm School of Economics. The couple married in 1983 and emigrated to New York City in 1996.

== Business career ==
Together with her husband Tom Sjögren, Tina was a professional explorer and became the first woman to complete the Three Poles Challenge. The couple was awarded a combined four Guinness world records for their expeditions.

As part of their expeditions, the couple invented lightweight satellite communication software and hardware solutions, which later turned into a business with customers including NASA, NGOs, defense units, and extreme explorers. This business was run under their ExplorersWeb.com subsidiary, HumanEdgeTech.

In 2020, Tina and Tom founded Pythom, a California-based aerospace company which is currently in development of a complete human-rated space transportation system, including rockets, landers and spaceships for Earth, Mars, the Moon and asteroids. The space fleet is designed around successful principles from early Earth exploration: low cost, light travel, small and agile teams.

The couple has announced public aspirations of going to Mars on Pythom spacecraft within the end of this decade.

== Sources ==
- "Here's An Early Version Of Google Glass From 2001 Using Windows 98". Business Insider.
- "Taking Technology to Extremes". The New York Times. Image.
- Smith, Cameron M. (January 2013). "How Humans Will Evolve on Multigenerational Space Exploration Missions". Scientific American.
- "2013 International Space Development Conference in San Diego (featured speakers)". NSS.org.
- "Sjogren Tom & Tina". ExploraPoles.
