= Dominick Arduin =

French explorer (1961–2004)

- Born: 1961; Paris, France
- Disappeared: Siberia
- Status: Missing for 22 years, 7 months and 15 days
- Known for: Unsolved disappearance

Dominick Arduin (1961–2004) was a French woman who disappeared in her attempt to ski to the North Pole.

== Background ==
In 1988 Arduin moved to Finland. For 15 years she worked as a guide in Finnish Lapland and received dual citizenship. She said that she had grown up in the Alps, that she had been orphaned at an early age, had recovered from cancer and had been the only child aside from a dead sister. This backstory of hers was discovered to be fabricated after her disappearance.

Arduin reached the Magnetic North Pole in the spring 2001. She was rescued after the first failed attempt to reach the geographic North Pole in 2003. Most of her toes had to be amputated due to frostbite.

== Disappearance ==
On 5 March 2004 Arduin began her second attempt to become the first woman to ski alone to the North Pole. She set out from Cape Arctichesky in Siberia. She lost contact after one day of travel. A helicopter search failed to find any trace of her though they recovered another traveler, Frédéric Chamard-Boudet. who had disappeared March 5, 2004. The search ended on 21 March.

After Arduin's disappearance, the Finnish author Sven Pahajoki decided to write a book about her life and, while researching her background, realized Arduin had been lying all along about her life and accomplishments. Her sister and uncle were located and it was discovered that she had previously disappeared and they did not believe she had died, but disappeared on purpose for financial reasons and to escape her lies. She was born and grew up in Paris, she never had cancer and her sister had not died. Her father died when she was 19, her mother a few years later.

== See also ==
- List of people who disappeared mysteriously (2000–present)
