= Mostafa Salameh =

Jordanian-Palestinian mountaineer

Mostafa Salameh مصطفى سلامة
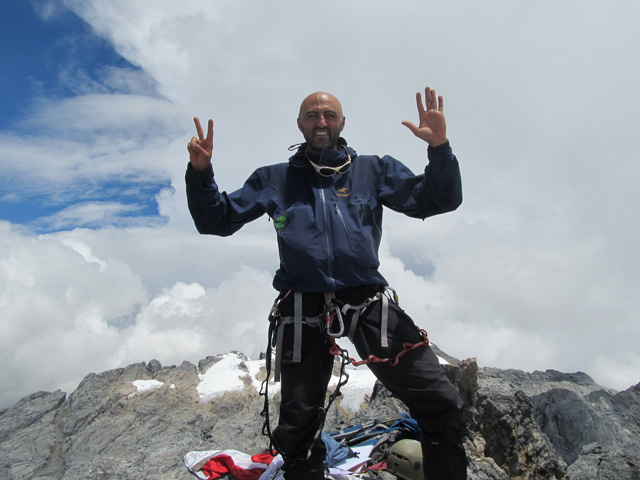
- Mostafa Salameh completing the Seven Summits

Personal information
- Nationality: Jordanian / Palestinian - British
- Spouse: Ruba Abughaida (Children: Amar Salameh)
- Children: Zaidan Salameh (Seb), Ayman Salameh, Yacob Salameh, Sami Salameh, Amar Abughaida-Salameh
- Parents: Mahmoud Salameh, Feryal Salem

Climbing career
- Major ascents: Seven Summits and Two Poles

Mostafa Salameh, OSJ (born June 25, 1970) is a Jordanian - Palestinian mountaineer who has completed the Seven Summits, including Mount Everest in 2008.

== Biography ==
Mostafa Salameh is one of only 20 people to ever climb the Seven Summits and conquer the South Pole and the North Pole - known as the ‘Explorers Grand Slam.’ Born in Kuwait to Palestinian refugee parents, it was never Mostafa's intention to become a climber. His mountaineering journey began in 2004 following a vivid dream with spiritual intervention. After dreaming that he was reciting the call to prayer from the world's highest peak, a persistent Mostafa followed his calling and became the first Palestinian-Jordanian to climb Mount Everest in 2008. That was also the year King Abdullah II of Jordan Knighted Mostafa.

Today, he is an Explorer, Inspirational Speaker, Fundraiser and Author. In March 2016, Mostafa published his first book titled ‘Dreams of a Refugee’ with Bloomsbury Publishing. In 2018, it was translated into Arabic. In 2019, Mostafa published “Everest” in Arabic and English, the first of a series of seven children's books about his adventures. In 2021, Mostafa published “Journey of Ascension and Rising" a book in Arabic about the spiritual journey of the mountain. Today Mostafa combines his sporting career with speaking roles. A large part of his time is passionately invested in inspiring and motivating children, youths and adults into realizing their own dreams.

== Speaking Roles ==
Mostafa acts as a motivational speaker and adventure consultant, addressing youths, corporate management and employees. He focuses on themes such as team building, leadership, motivation and facing personal fears. He names as his role models the philosopher Al Razi, the explorer Ibn Battuta, the philosopher, mathematician, physician and musician Al Kindi and the poet, jurist and theologian Rumi.

== Climbs for Cause ==
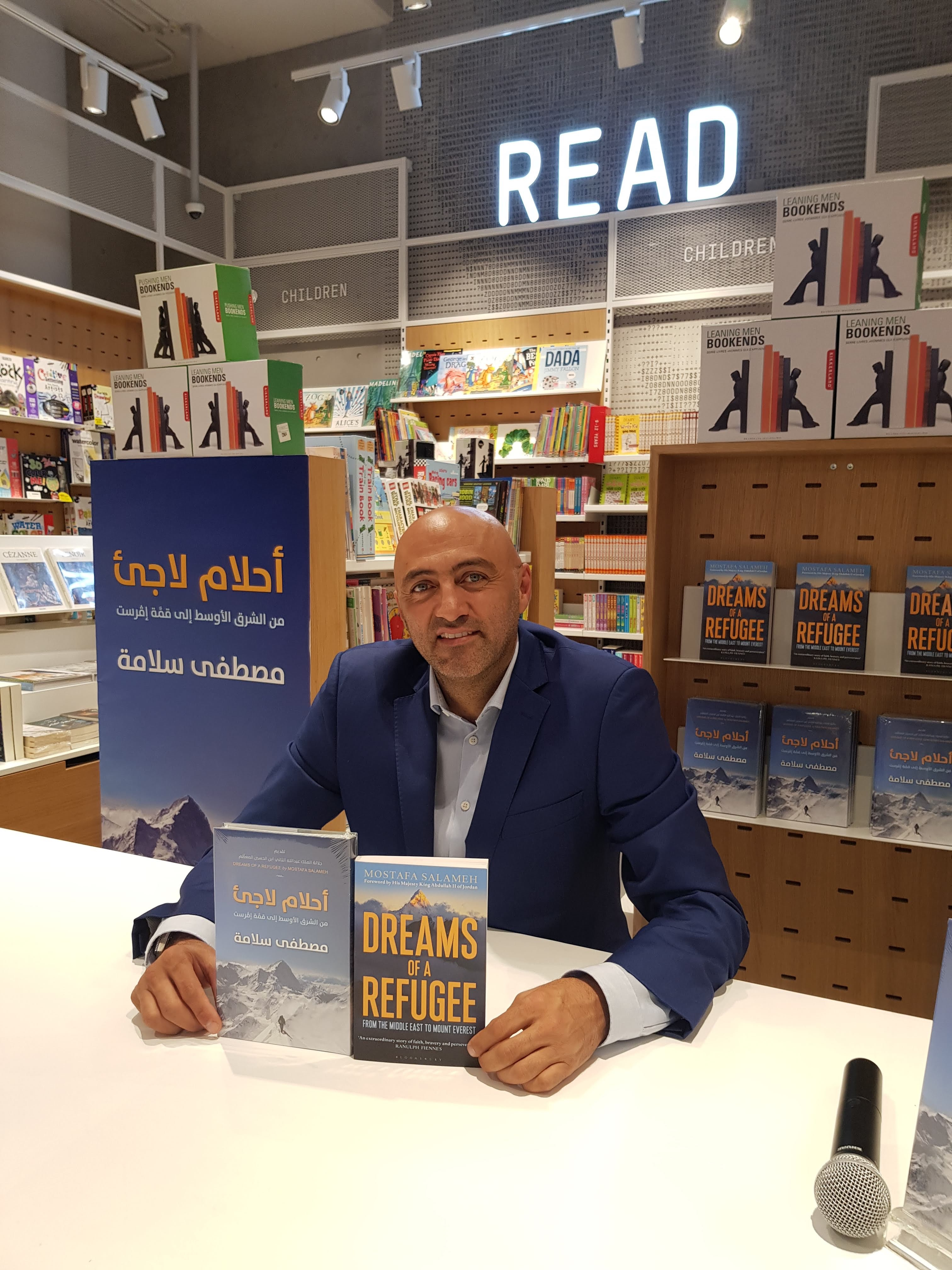
Book Signing

In 2012, Mostafa launched the "From the Lowest Point to the Highest Point for Cancer" initiative, where he led a group of 20 individuals to Everest Base Camp in Nepal in April 2013, raising $620,000 for the King Hussein Cancer Center (KHCC), and again in February 2014, when he led another group of Jordanians to the summit of Mount Kilimanjaro in Tanzania raising $1,400,000.00 for the benefit of the KHCC. As of 2022, Mostafa has raised US$5.8 million for charitable causes.

== Education ==
- Honorary Doctorate - Queen Margaret University in Edinburgh (2022)
- B.A. International Hospitality & Tourism Management – Queen Margaret University in Edinburgh (2001)
- B.A. Hotel Management – Hotel Management College Amman (1992)

== Climbs ==
- June 2004 – Highest point in North America, Mount McKinley (20,320 ft (6,190 m)eter
- January 2005 – Highest point in Antarctica Vinson Massif (16,050 ft) 5140 Meter
- March 2005 – First attempt at Mount Everest (reached 23,000 ft); uncompleted due to stomach ulcer
- September 2005 – Highest point in Europe Mount Elbrus(18,510 ft) 5642 Meter
- July 2006 – Climbed the highest point in Western Europe Mont Blanc
- March 2007 – 2nd attempt at Mount Everest ... uncompleted due to chest infection
- July 2007 – Climbed the highest point in Africa Mount Kilimanjaro 19,331 feet, 5895 Meters
- February 2008 – Climbed the highest point in South America Aconcagua 22,841 feet, 6960 Meter
- May 25, 2008 @ 6:50 am- Climbed the highest point in the world, Mount Everest 29,500) – Jordan Independence day
- November 16, 2012 – Climbed the highest point in the Australia/Oceana continent, Carstensz Pyramid, (4,884 meters / 16,024 feet)
- April 2013 – Everest Base Camp: Climbed to the Base Camp of Everest with a group of Jordanians for the support of the King Hussein Cancer Center (From the Lowest to the Highest for Cancer)
- February 2014 – Kilimanjaro Summit: Climbed the highest point in Africa (Kilimanjaro) with a team of 26 Jordanians for the support of the King Hussein Cancer Center (From the Lowest to the Highest for Cancer)
- April 19, 2014 – Reached the North Pole on a skiing trip
- January 15, 2016 - Reached the South Pole
- May 12, 2018 - Crossed Greenland from North to South
- 2019-2022 - Climbs for cause and mountaineering expeditions

== Recognition ==
- Knighted by King Abdullah of Jordan (October 6, 2008)

== Bibliography ==
He has authored the book, Dreams of a Refugee: From the Middle East to Mount Everest.

- Salameh, Mostafa (2016), Dreams of a Refugee: From the Middle East to Mount Everest, Bloomsbury Continuum, ISBN 978-1472927514

== Books ==
In March 2016, Mostafa published his first book, Dreams of a Refugee, with Bloomsbury Publishing. It was translated into Arabic in 2018. In 2019, Mostafa published Everest’s book “Dare to Dream” in Arabic and English, and in 2022 Kilimanjaro “Stronger Together” Books for Children, a series of 7 story books about his adventures, all published by Jabal Amman Publishing. In 2021, Mostafa published the book “The Journey of Ascension” in Arabic about the spiritual journey of the mountain.
