= Wang Lei (mountaineer) =

Chinese mountaineer

Wang Lei (Chinese: 王雷; pinyin: Wáng Léi) is the first Chinese woman and the first Asian American to have climbed the Seven Summits and skied to both the North Pole and South Pole, the so-called Explorers Grand Slam.

== Biography ==
Lei was born in Nantong of Jiangsu province and grew up in Beijing. Both her parents are engineers. She holds a B.S. degree in Computer Science from Tsinghua University in Beijing, an M.S. degree in Computer Science from the University of North Carolina at Chapel Hill, and an MBA degree in Finance and Marketing from the Wharton School.

On May 24, 2010, Lei summited Mount Everest and became the first Chinese woman and the first Asian American who successfully climbed the highest peak on each of the seven continents and skied to both the North Pole and the South Pole.

== Ascents ==
Time table of Lei's climbs:

- 2003 Kilimanjaro
- 2005 Elbrus
- 2007 Mount McKinley (Denali)
- 2007 Carstensz Pyramid (Puncak Jaya)
- 2007 Vinson Massif
- 2008 South Pole
- 2008 Aconcagua
- 2008 North Pole
- 2010 Mount Everest
