= Christian Stangl =

Austrian mountaineer and mountain guide

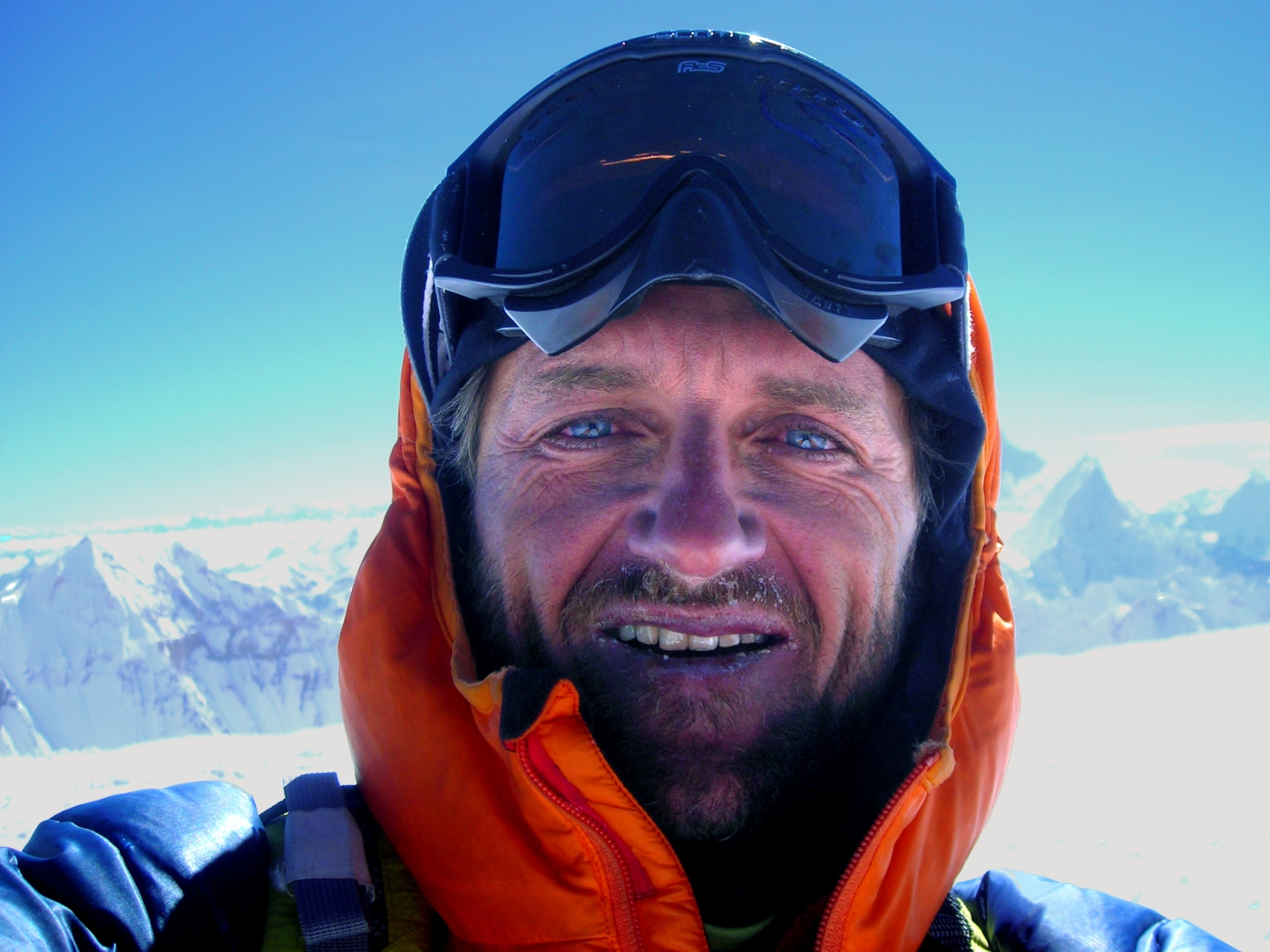
- Stangl on the summit of Cho Oyu (8,201 m) in 2007
- Born: July 10, 1966 (age 60); Landl, Austria
- Other name: Skyrunner
- Education: Electrical engineering in a higher technical institute
- Occupations: Alpine style mountaineer; mountain guide
- Known for: first person to ascend the three highest mountains on all seven continents (Triple Seven Summits) in 2013

Christian Stangl (Austrian German: [ˈkrɪsti̯a(ː)n ˈʃtaŋl̩]; born July 10, 1966) is an Austrian alpine style mountaineer and mountain guide. He has become known as Skyrunner by numerous exceptionally fast ascents of high mountains. His major success was in 2013, when he became the first person to ascend the three highest mountains on all seven continents, the so-called "Triple Seven Summits".

On January 15, 2013, he was the first person to ascent the Seven Second Summits, the second highest peaks of all seven continents. On August 23, 2013, after climbing Shkhara (5193m), he became the first person to have reached the third highest peaks on all seven continents, the Seven Third Summits. Because of measurement and definition issues Stangl climbed 30 peaks instead of only 21 to avoid any inaccuracy and misconception. On September 17, 2013, his achievement was certified by Guinness World Records in London.

== Early career ==
Christian Stangl was born in 1966 in Landl (Styria), in the east of the Gesäuse National Park. After finishing school, he completed his education as an electrical engineer in a Higher Technical Institute. When he was 16, he began climbing and ventured into solo climbing, speed climbing, enchainment and winter climbing in the Alps.

In 1990, he began high-altitude mountaineering in the Andes and the Himalaya. In 1991, during an attempt to climb a new route in the south wall of the 7285m high Baintha Brakk, he was seriously injured in an avalanche. In 1998, Stangl reached the Shishapangma, his first 8000er via the southwest face, the so-called "British Route".

In 1995, Stangl started speed climbing ("skyrunning") the high Andes peaks. In the following years he succeeded in his first series of skyruns, reaching nine 6000ers within 18 days. Over the next few years, he successfully completed several other challenges in the Andes: Ten 6000ers within 7 days (2005), three 6000ers within one day (2006), and four 6000ers within one day (2008).

== Seven summits speed climbing ==
In 2001, he succeeded in a solo climb of Cho Oyu. At 7000m his new route meets the 1954 Tichy-Route.

In 2006, he did ABC (Tibet) to the summit of Mount Everest in 16 hours and 42 minutes without the use of bottled oxygen, in league with the fastest times for this type of route.

In 2008, Stangl became famous after completing his speed climbing series of the Seven Summits. For reaching all seven summits it took him 58 hours and 45 minutes.

Specific times for single ascents:

- Mount Everest: 16:42
- Aconcagua: 4:25
- Denali: 16:45
- Elbrus: 5:18
- Kilimanjaro: 5:36
- Mount Vinson: 9:10
- Carstensz Pyramid: 0:49

At the same time, he set new records for climbing Aconcagua, Elbrus, Mount Vinson and Carstensz Pyramid. The film The Skyrunner (2007) deals with Stangl's 49-minute record ascent of the Carstensz Pyramid.

== Second Seven Summits ==
As a continuation of the Seven Summits speed-project Stangl pursued the goal of skyrunning up the second highest peaks of each continent, the so-called Seven Second Summits, with the vision of being the first person to complete the Seven Summits as well as the Seven Second Summits. In 2008, Stangl undertook his first expedition to K2, the second highest mountain of Asia (8611m). After the death of 11 mountaineers in an ice avalanche at the Bottleneck (approx. 8200m), Stangl, as well as most of the other mountaineers, aborted the expedition (see 2008 K2 disaster). In the same year, Stangl took part in an extensive Antarctica expedition and went up Mount Vinson, Mount Shinn and Mount Gardner again, and attempted to climb the north face of Mount Tyree.

In January 2013, Stangl finally succeeded in climbing all Second Seven Summits.

== Triple Seven Summits ==
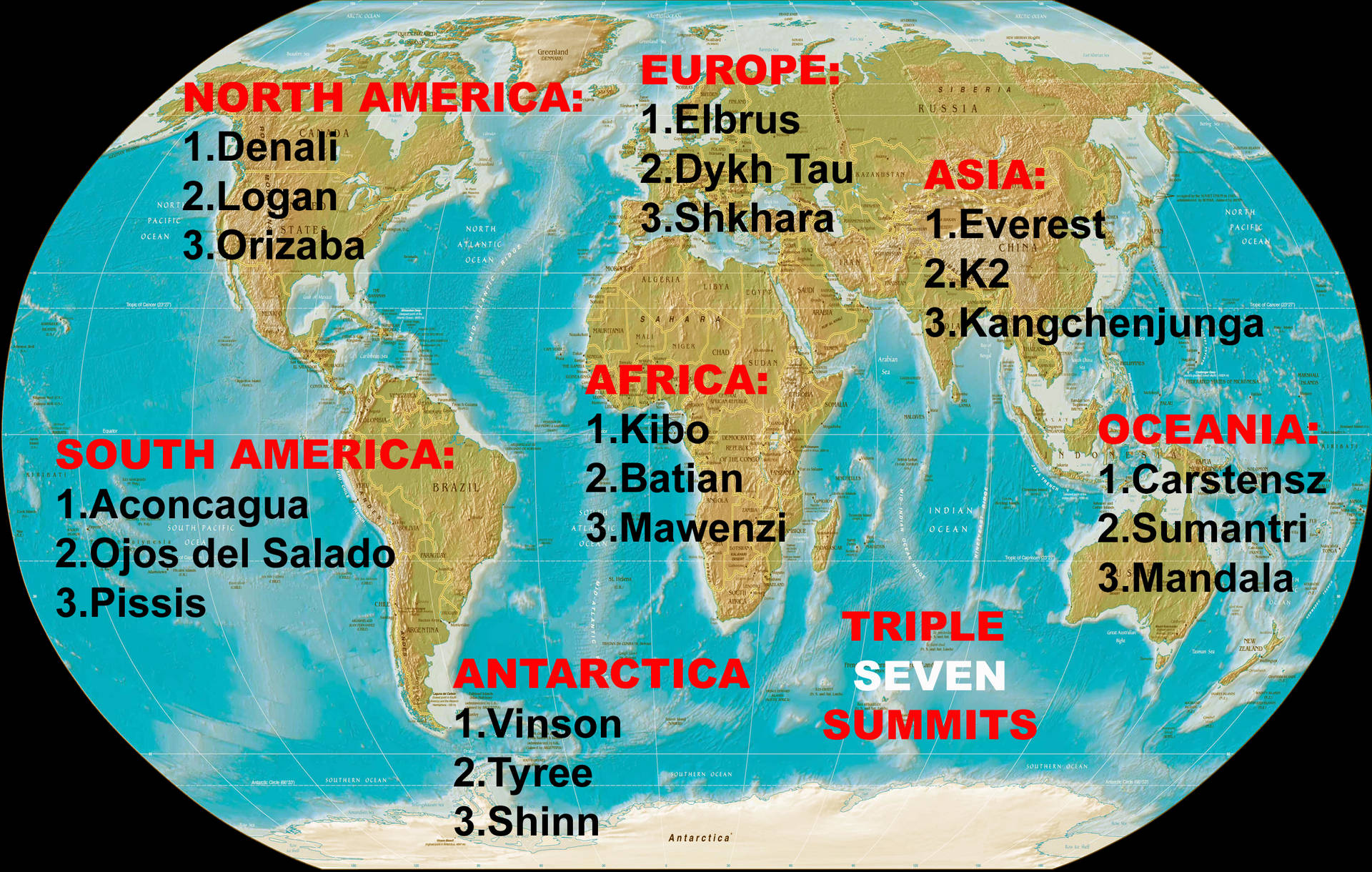
World map showing the three highest mountains of all seven continents, the Triple Seven Summits.

In the aftermath of K2-scandal, Stangl underwent a fundamental change of mindset and stayed out of the limelight. Nevertheless, after an interruption of his mountaineering activities, he continued to climb the peaks of the seven continents. He expanded his plan of climbing the Seven Second Summits and planned to become the first person to ever climb the three highest mountains of each continent, the so-called Triple Seven Summits. This made him turn away from speed climbing. Now, to be more effective, he put emphasis on precise documentation of his activities, using photos, videos, and GPS tracking. In Spring 2011, Stangl cycled from the Indian ocean to the Himalayas on a simple military bicycle, then walked for 11 days to the base camp of Kangchenjunga (8586m) and then, after a total of 76 days, reached the summit of the third highest mountain of Asia. In summer 2011, he went to K2 again, but as in the years before, since 2008, also in this season, not a single climber could reach the summit on the Pakistani side of the mountain.

For the end of 2011, Stangl planned an expedition to Mount Tyree (4852m) to climb the second highest mountain of Antarctica. As for Stangl, climbing the Seven Second Summits became a milestone along the way climbing the world's 21 highest mountains. He invited his competitor from South Tyrol, Hans Kammerlander to climb Mount Tyree with him. On January 3, 2012, all three expedition members, Stangl, Kammerlander and the Austrian Robert Miller reached the peak of Mount Tyree via the east wall and the northeast ridge.

In the summer of 2012, Stangl started a new expedition to K2 at which the conditions were considerably better than in the years before. Late in the evening of July 12, Stangl and his fellow polish climber Adam Bielecki, started their crucial ascent from base camp III (7400m) and reached the peak of the second highest mountain in the world at around 16:00. The climbers completed the climb successfully without any bottled oxygen and returned to base camp III 23 hours later. After the success of ascending K2, Stangl was now able to concentrate on the outstanding mountains of his Triple Seven Summits project. In January 2013, Stangl climbed Sumantri (4870m) in Oceania, as well as the three highest mountains of mainland Australia, Mount Kosciuszko (2228m), Mount Townsend (2209m), and Mount Twynam (2195m) in the Snowy Mountains and in New South Wales, in order to ascend the highest peaks according to the Bass list. For the completion of the project, Stangl travelled to the Kaukasus region to climb the 5193m high Shkara via the south face on August 23, 2013, together with the Georgian Archil Badriashvili and the Austrian Michael Haidn. The third highest mountain in Europe was the last of the Triple Seven Summits.

Subsequently, Stangl's success was approved by the chronicler Eberhard Jurgalski, the expert commission of the Guinness World Records and numerous other alpine journalists.

The Guinness World Records awarded Stangl three Alpine records:

- The first person to successfully climb the "Triple Seven Summits" (within seven years – Mount Everest 2006 – Shkhara 2013)
- The first person to successfully climb the "Seven Second Summits" (within six years – Ojos del Salado 2007 – Sumantri 2013)
- The first person to successfully climb the "Seven Third Summits" (within five years – Mount Shinn 2008 – Shkhara 2013)

=== Table of the Triple Seven Summits ===
The table shows the key data of the ascents of the Triple Seven Summits project. It is mainly based upon a list of Eberhard Jurgalski, created 2013. The numbering shows more than the actual 21 mountains, acknowledging two different lists of alpinistic tradition, the Bass version (B), and more challenging Messner version (M).

Nr.	Mountain	Date	Altitude	Continent	Ascent series	M	B	Comments
1	Mount Everest	May 25, 2006	8,848 m	Asia	Seven Summits	✔	✔	North route, Skyrun in 16:42h, without additional oxygen
2	Aconcagua	November 13, 2007	6,962 m	South America	Seven Summits	✔	✔	1990, 2002, 2007. Skyrun 4:25h (Record in 2002)
3	Denali	Mai 26, 2007	6,194 m	North America	Seven Summits	✔	✔	West Buttress route, Skyrun 16:45h
4	Kibo	February 13, 2009	5,895 m	Africa	Seven Summits	✔	✔	Rongai route, Skyrun 5:36h (2004)
5	Elbrus	June 3, 2012	5,642 m	Europe	Seven Summits	✔	✔	2004, 2006, 2012. Skyrun 5:18h (Record in 2006)
6	Mount Vinson	December 7, 2007	4,892 m	Antarctica	Seven Summits	✔	✔	2007, 2009. Skyrun 9:10h (Record in 2007)
7a	Carstensz Pyramid	April 8, 2007	4,884 m	Oceania / Australia	Seven Summits	✔		North face, Harrer route, Skyrun 0:49h (Record)
7b	Mount Kosciuszko	January 27, 2013	2,228 m	Oceania / Australia	Seven Summits		✔	
8	K2	July 31, 2012	8,611 m	Asia	Seven Second Summits	✔	✔	South east ridge (Abruzzi), without additional oxygen
9	Ojos del Salado	February 24, 2007	6,893 m	South America	Seven Second Summits	✔	✔	Summits: 1996, 2007. Skyrun 3:44h (2007)
10	Mount Logan	May 22, 2010	5,959 m	North America	Seven Second Summits	✔	✔	King Trench route
11	Dychtau	September 6, 2009	5,205 m	Europe	Seven Second Summits	✔	✔	North west ridge
12	Mount Kenya (Batian)	February 6, 2009	5,199 m	Africa	Seven Second Summits	✔	✔	Nelion east face, ridge passage to Batian
13	Mount Tyree	January 3, 2012	4,852 m	Antarctica	Seven Second Summits	✔	✔	Route via north east ridge and east face
14a	Sumantri	January 15, 2013	4,870 m	Oceania / Australia	Seven Second Summits	✔		South face, traverse from Ngga Pulu and Sumantri
14b	Mount Townsend	January 28, 2013	2,209 m	Oceania / Australia	Seven Second Summits		✔	
15	Kangchenjunga	May 20, 2011	8,586 m	Asia	Seven Third Summits	✔	✔	South west face, without additional oxygen
16	Monte Pissis	December 21, 2008	6,795 m	South America	Seven Third Summits	✔	✔	Route via north face
17	Pico de Orizaba	December 16, 2010	5,636 m	North America	Seven Third Summits	✔	✔	Route via Refugio Piedra Grande
18	Shkhara	August 23, 2013	5,193 m	Europe	Seven Third Summits	✔	✔	South east face
19	Mawenzi	February 12, 2009	5,148 m	Africa	Seven Third Summits	✔	✔	Öhler route variation
20	Mount Shinn	November 25, 2008	4,660 m	Antarctica	Seven Third Summits	✔	✔	First ascent, South face direct, solo
21a	Puncak Mandala	February 28, 2012	4,758 m	Oceania / Australia	Seven Third Summits	✔		New route via north west face
21b	Mount Twynam	January 28, 2013	2,195 m	Oceania / Australia	Seven Third Summits		✔	

In addition to the 21 mountains of the Messner version, Stangl ascended further nine summits on three continents to also meet the requirements of the Bass version. This includes ascending the three highest peaks of Australian mainland Mount Kosciuszko, Mount Townsend and Mount Twynam. In course of the project, he anew climbed the three highest peaks of the Alps, Mont Blanc (4,810 m), Dufourspitze (4,634 m), and Dom (4,545 m), in 2013. According to one of multiple acknowledged scholarly opinions, the border between Europe and Asia is to be located north of Caucasus, alongside the Kuma–Manych Depression. Considering that, the Alps would be the highest mountain range of Europe, making Mont Blanc, Dufourspitze and Dom the highest summits of the continent. Due to potential uncertainties regarding the measurement accuracy of altitudes, Stangl also climbed three additional mountains, Ngga Pulu (2007) und Puncak Trikora (2010) in Oceania, and Rwenzori (Margherita Peak) in Africa (2012).

== Further ventures / personal life ==
Since younger days, Christian Stangl undertakes extended bicycle treks. In 1985, he cycled across the Alps in 28 days, climbing Matterhorn, Mont Blanc, Eiger, Piz Palü, Cevedale, Königsspitze, and Ortler, on the way. In 2005, he traversed Atacama desert solo, north to south, covering a distance of 900 kilometers. For training matters, Stangl goes for long bicycle treks, for instance cycling from Admont to Gibraltar within 21 days, in 2001. In course of the Triple Seven Summits project, he rode from Austria to Caucasus and back, carrying the entire expedition luggage.

In 2019, Christian Stangl made the solo first ascent of the south-southeast Ridge of Cerro Ramada (6,384m) .

In 2022, Christian Stangl was able to reach Alma Negra (6,110 m) in Argentina on a new route from the South in a solo ascent.

Christian Stangl now lives in Admont, and works as state-approved mountain guide and project manager. He gives speeches and does presentations about his mountaineering ventures, and holds special workshops for executives.

== Books ==
- Stangl, Christian; Kren, Ernst (2009). Skyrunner. Unglaubliche Aufstiege eines alpinen Protagonisten (in German). Leykam. ISBN 3-70-117642-6.
- Stangl, Christian (2015). GIB NIEMALS AUF! Vom K2-Skandal zum Erfolg auf den Triple Seven Summits (in German). Schall-Verlag. ISBN 3-90-053380-6.
