= List of mountain lists =

Perhaps the first of what would become many notable mountain lists around the world was Sir Hugh Munro’s catalogue of the Munros, the peaks above 3,000’ elevation in Scotland. Once defined the list became a popular target for what became known as peak bagging, where the adventurous attempted to summit all of the peaks on the list.

Over time the peaks on such lists grew more challenging, with perhaps the eight-thousanders as the most notable (the mentioned list being first fully completed by Reinhold Messner in 1986). Other extreme examples are the Seven Summits, defined as the highest peaks on each of the seven continents.

An ever-growing collection of peak lists is maintained and published on mountaineering-related websites.

== Worldwide ==
- The Eight-thousanders are the fourteen mountains over 8,000 metres (26,247 ft) in height, all in the Himalaya and Karakoram ranges in Asia.
- The Seven Summits are the highest peaks on each continent, from the Vinson Massif in Antarctica to Everest in Asia.
- The Seven Second Summits are the second-highest peaks on each continent.
- The Seven Third Summits are the third highest peaks on each continent.
- The Volcanic Seven Summits are the highest volcanoes on each of the continents.
- The Ultras are mountains worldwide that have a topographic prominence of at least 1,500 metres (4,921 ft), regardless of location, absolute height, or other merit.
- The Snow Leopards are the five peaks of the former Soviet Union over 7,000 metres (22,966 ft) in height.

== Europe ==
- The Alpine four-thousanders are the 128 summits (82 'official summits' and 46 'lesser summits') of 4,000 metres (13,123 ft) or more in the Alps in France, Italy and Switzerland as defined by the UIAA.
- The Six mountains of the Alps with the most difficult north faces.
- The Pyrenean three-thousanders are the 129 summits of 3,000 metres (9,843 ft) or more in the Pyrenees in France and Spain as defined by a UIAA-sponsored joint Franco-Spanish team.

=== British Isles ===
The hills of Britain and Ireland are classified into various lists for 'peak-bagging' purposes. Among the better-known lists are the following:

- The Munros: important mountains in Scotland over 3,000 feet (914.4 m); there are 282 Munros and 226 Munro Tops.
- The Furths: mountains in the British Isles, but not in Scotland, which would otherwise qualify as Munros; there are 34 Furths in the British Isles.
- The P600 (the "Majors"): mountains in the British Isles with a prominence above 600 metres (1,969 ft); there are 120 P600s.
- The Corbetts: mountains in Scotland between 2,500 feet (762 m) and 3,000 feet (914 m), with a prominence above 500 feet (152.4 m); there are 222 Corbetts.
- The Marilyns: hills and mountains in the British Isles with a prominence above 150 metres (492 ft), regardless of height or other merit; there are 2,011 Marilyns
- The Simms: mountains in the British Isles above 600 metres (1,968.5 ft), with a prominence above 30 metres (98.4 ft); there are 2,754 Simms.
- The Wainwrights: the 214 fells in the English Lake District that have a chapter in one of Alfred Wainwright's Pictorial Guides to the Lakeland Fells.
- The Vandeleur-Lynams: those mountains in Ireland over 600 metres (1,969 ft) in height, with a prominence over 15 metres (49 ft). There are 273 Vandeleur-Lynams in Ireland.
- The Nuttalls in England and Wales: A list of all mountains in over 2,000 ft (609.6m) with more than a 49.2 ft (15m) prominence.

== North America ==
- The 126 major 4000-meter summits of North America.

=== Canada ===
- The 19 major 4000-metre summits of Canada (including six shared with The United States.)

=== Guatemala ===
- The two major 4000 meter summits of Guatemala (including one shared with Mexico.)

=== Mexico ===
- The ten major 4000-meter summits of Mexico (including one shared with Guatemala.)

=== United States ===
- The 104 major 4000-meter summits of the United States (including two on the Pacific Island of Hawaiʻi and six shared with Canada.)
- The 67 fourteeners of the contiguous United States (peaks with at least 14,000 feet (4,267.2 m) of elevation and 300 feet (91.44 m) of topographic prominence), including:
  - the 53 Colorado fourteeners,
  - the 12 California fourteeners, and
  - Mount Rainier and Liberty Cap in the State of Washington.
- The highest point in each of the 50 US states (ranging from 105.2 meters (345 ft) to 6,193.5 meters (20,320 ft) in elevation).
- Several peakbagging sections of the Sierra Club's Angeles Chapter maintain lists of notable peaks, and organize outings to climb them.
  - The Sierra Peaks Section keeps a list of peaks in the Sierra Nevada, and a series of emblems (levels) for climbing many them.
  - The Desert Peaks Section climbs peaks in deserts of the Southwestern U.S. and Baja Mexico.
  - The Hundred Peaks Section bags all the 277 peaks in Southern California over 5,000 feet (1,524.0 m).
  - The Lower Peaks Committee keeps a list of peaks in Southern California shorter than 5,000 feet (1,524.0 m).
  - The Great Basin Peaks List maintained by Toiyabe Chapter of the Sierra Club
- The 46 highest peaks in New York's Adirondack Mountains (or rather, the list of 46 peaks once thought to be the highest. Successful completers are eligible for membership in the Adirondack Forty-Sixers)
- The 48 peaks over 4,000 feet (1,219 m) in the White Mountains of New Hampshire.
- The highest 100 peaks in New Hampshire
- The highest 100 peaks in New England.
- The "Fifty Finest" peaks in New England (those with the most topographic prominence)
- All peaks in the Catskill Mountains over 3,500 feet (1,066.8 m).Those who climb these, plus four of them a second time in winter, are eligible for membership in the Catskill Mountain 3500 Club.
- The Northeast 111: The White Mountain 48, the Adirondack 46 and 14 Maine peaks, five in Vermont and two Catskill summits over 4,000 feet (1,219.2 m).
- The Southern Sixers, or South Beyond 6000: all 40 peaks above 6,000 feet (1,828.8 m). in the southern Appalachians, which are in either North Carolina or Tennessee. Technically, there are more than forty 6,000 feet (1,828.8 m) mountains in the Southern Appalachians, but the list does not include mountains with peaks that have restricted access.
- The East Beyond 6000 are similar to the Southern Sixers: all 41 peaks above 6,000 feet (1,828.8 m) east of the Mississippi. These include the 40 Southern Sixers, plus Mount Washington (New Hampshire).
- The Saranac Lake 6er, 6 peaks in the Adirondacks of New York State that surround the town of Saranac Lake. Ultra club membership is awarded to those who can complete all 6 mountains in a 24-hour period. There is also a winter 6er.
- Adirondack Mountain Club Fire Tower Challenge. Started by the Glens Falls-Saratoga Chapter of the Adirondack Mountain Club, hikers visit 18 of 23 fire tower summits inside New York State's Adirondack Park and all five in the Catskills.

=== Greenland ===
- List of mountain peaks of Greenland

== South America ==
The standard list for the major peaks of the Andes is the list of 6000 m peaks as first compiled by John Biggar in 1996 and listed in his Andes guidebook. This list currently stands at 102 peaks, with no known completers.

== Asia ==
=== China ===
- Sacred Mountains of China, including
  - The Five Great Mountains of Ancient China
  - The Four Sacred Mountains of Buddhism

=== Japan ===
- 100 Famous Japanese Mountains – The major summits in Japan selected by Kyūya Fukada
- Three-thousanders (in Japan) – The 21 major 3000 meter summits in Japan

=== Indonesia ===
- List of ribus, peaks Indonesia with at least 1,000 metres (3,281 ft) of topographic prominence, known as the Ribus.

=== Taiwan ===
- The 100 Peaks of Taiwan

== Australia ==
Popular peak-bagging challenges in Australia include the State 8: the highest peak in each of the six states and two territories (excluding Australia's external territories).

The Abels are a group of peaks in Tasmania over 1100 metres above sea level and separated from other mountains by a drop of at least 150 metres on all sides. Named after Abel Tasman, the first European to sight Tasmania.

== See also ==
- Lists of mountains
- List of highest mountains
- Lists of highest points
- Lists of mountains by region
