= Puncak Mandala =

Mountain in Papua, Indonesia

- Julianatop, Aplim Apom
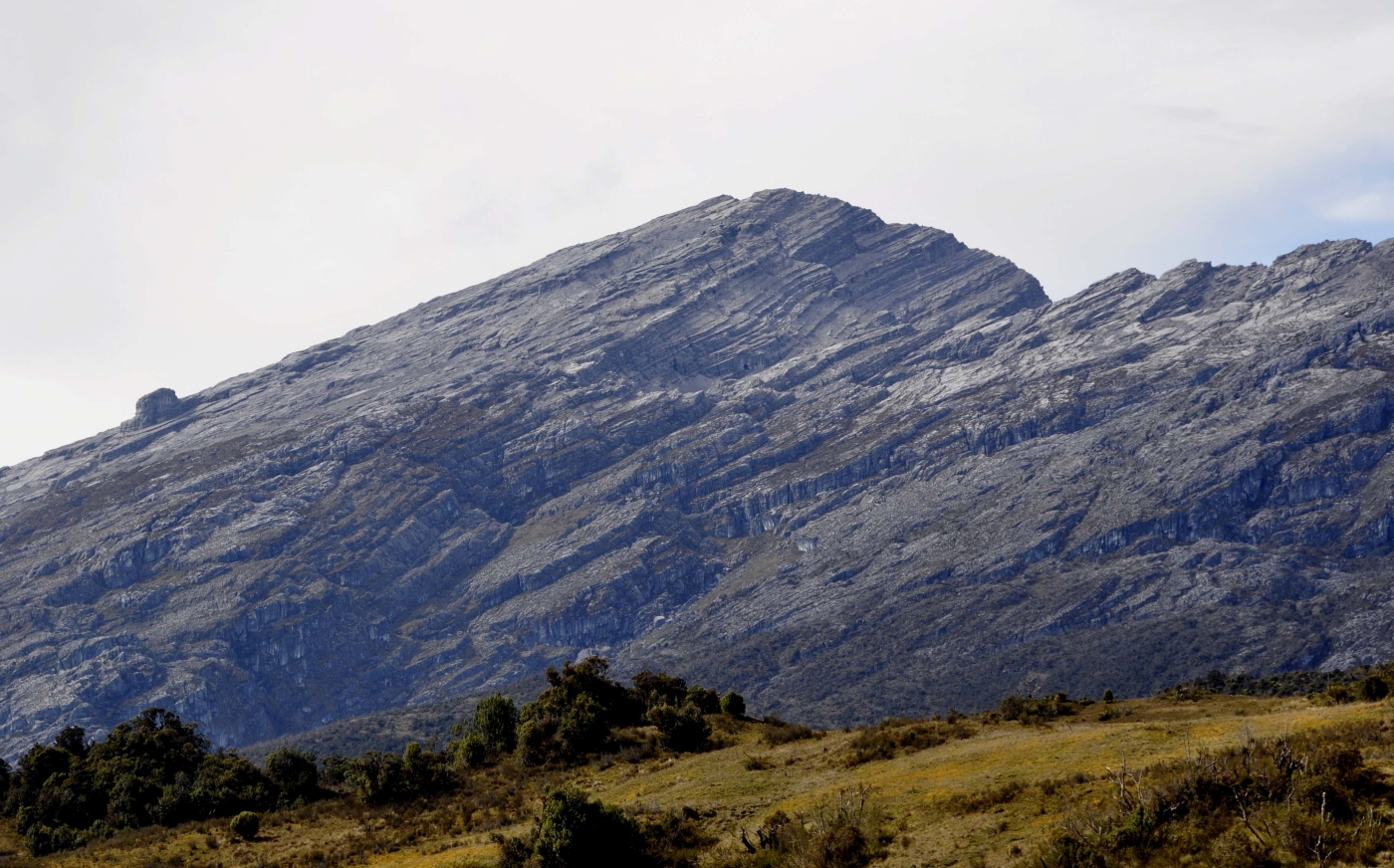
- Puncak Mandala from northwest

Highest point
- Elevation: 4,760 m (15,620 ft)
- Prominence: 2,760 m (9,060 ft)
- Listing: Seven Second Summits; Ultra
- Coordinates: 4°42′31″S 140°17′21″E

Geography
- Location within Western New Guinea Location within Highland Papua
- Location: Highland Papua Province, Indonesia
- Parent range: Jayawijaya (Orange) Range

Climbing
- First ascent: 9 September 1959 by Herman Verstappen, Arthur Escher, Max Tissing, Jan de Wijn & Piet ter Laag

Puncak Mandala or Mandala Peak (until 1963 Julianatop or Juliana Peak) is a mountain located in Highland Papua, Indonesia. At 4,760 metres (15,617 ft), it is the highest point of the Jayawijaya (Orange) Range and is included in Seven Second Summits. Following Puncak Jaya/Mount Carstensz (4884 m) 350 km to the west, Mandala is the second-highest freestanding mountain on New Guinea, and Indonesia.

== Etymology ==
Locally, the mountain peak is called Aplim Apom, a holy place where the creator Atangki created humans, Aplim Apom Sibilki (children of Aplim Apom). Under Indonesian administration, the mountain is called Mandala Peak. While the reasoning was not recorded at the time, the name Mandala corresponds with the Aplim Apom creation myth. The mountain is believed to be the center of the universe and the mythical place where Atangki resides.

== Geology and glaciers ==
Mandala is one of the three high massifs of Western New Guinea, together with the Carstensz and Trikora complexes. This peak used to have an ice cap, estimated to be roughly 100 metres or 300 feet deep in 1959. It was last seen in 1989, at a size of 15,000 square metres (160,000 ft^{2}), its disappearance being confirmed in 2003. However, the ice cap is estimated to have disappeared several years before this, given the small size of the glacier in 1989. Based on the Shuttle Radar Topography Mission data, this peak is likely higher than Puncak Trikora, which lost its icecap in about 1960.

== Ascents ==
Due to its remoteness and the difficulty of the approach route, Mandala (like many of the New Guinea peaks) has very rarely been climbed. Climbers from the Dutch 1959 expedition to the Star Mountains successfully climbed the peak on 9 September.

Austrian mountaineer Christian Stangl climbed Mandala on February 28, 2012, during his bid to be the first person to ascend the Seven Second and Seven Third Summits.

== See also ==
- List of Southeast Asian mountains
- List of ultras of the Malay Archipelago
- List of highest mountains of New Guinea
