= Hans Kammerlander =

Italian mountaineer

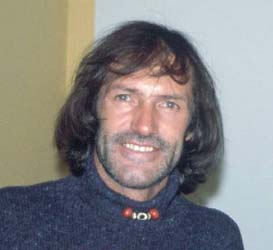
- Hans Kammerlander in 2001
- Born: 6 December 1956 (age 69); Sand in Taufers, South Tyrol, Italy
- Occupation: Mountaineer
- Website: www.kammerlander.com (in German)

Hans Kammerlander (born 6 December 1956, Sand in Taufers, South Tyrol, Italy) is an Italian mountaineer, living in Ahornach, a hamlet nearby Sand in Taufers. He has climbed 11 of the 14 8000m peaks. In 1984, together with Reinhold Messner he was the first climber to traverse two 8000 m peaks before descending to base camp. On January 6, 2012, he falsely announced that he was the first person on the Second Seven Summits. No less than three of his "second" seven summits achievements turned out to be false, because he either picked the wrong mountain (e.g. Puncak Trikora instead of Sumantri), the wrong peak (e.g. on Mount Logan) or he turned around shortly before the summit (as on Dykh-Tau). The false summit claims were revealed on Mount Logan, further on Mount Puncak Trikora, and on Mount Dyck Tau.

== Biography ==
He teamed with Messner, the first man to climb all fourteen 8000m peaks, on successful climbs of Cho Oyu, Gasherbrum I and II, Dhaulagiri, Makalu, and Lhotse, and is a UIAGM mountain guide (English, International Federation of Mountain Guide Associations). Chris Bonington described Messner's relationship with Kammerlander as the most "amicable" of Messner's climbing partnerships.

From 1996 to 2006, he held the Guinness World Record for the fastest ascent without supplemental oxygen of Mount Everest (16 hours and 45 minutes) and fastest ascent from Everest North Base Camp.

In 1990 he made the first ski descent of Nanga Parbat. In 1996 he failed in an attempt to be the first to ski down Mount Everest, after removing his skis and climbing down from 300 metres below the summit, skiing down from 7700m, although he set a then speed record during that attempt of 17 hours to climb from base camp to the summit of Everest via the North Col. Kammerlander abandoned an attempt to be the first to ski from the summit of K2 when he saw a Korean climber fall to his death.

In 2001 Kammerlander announced that he would not attempt to climb Manaslu, necessary to complete all 8000m peaks, due to losing several close friends on an attempt on the mountain.

In 2012 Kammerlander claimed to be the first person to complete the Seven Second Summits, but doubts were raised about his ascent of Mount Logan. A further fraudulent summit claim on Mount Puncak Trikora confirms that Italian Hans Kammerlander never completed the Second Seven Summits series.

Further, due the lack of any summit proof and the contradictory statement of his climbing partner on Mt. Dyck Tau, once again some serious doubts of Kammerlander´s summit success on this “Second Seven Summit” were raised soon.

Finally, modern drone video footage, published by a local Russian mountain guide, provided full proof that Hans Kammerlander did not reach the summit of Mt. Dyck Tau.

== Works ==
- Abstieg zum Erfolg (2000) Piper Verlag GmbH, ISBN 978-3-492-23052-0.
- Fou d'altitude (2001) Guerin, ISBN 978-2-911755-50-7.
- Sopra e sotto. Storie di montagna (with Ingrid Beikircher, V. Montagna) (2004) Piper Verlag GmbH, ISBN 978-88-7972-588-0.
- Unten und oben: Berggeschichten (with Raimund Prinoth) (2005) Piper Verlag GmbH, ISBN 978-3-492-24408-4.
- Am seidenen Faden: K2 und andere Grenzerfahrungen (2005) Piper Verlag GmbH, ISBN 978-3-492-23052-0.
- Appeso a un filo di seta. Il K2 e altre esperienze estreme (with V. Montagna) (2006) Corbaccio, ISBN 978-88-7972-689-4.
- Windgeflüster: Hans Kammerlander 50 (with Sigi Pircher) (2006) Athesia Gmbh Verlagsansta, ISBN 978-88-8266-417-6.
- Direttissima zum Erfolg: Was (Automobil-)Manager vom Höhenbergsteigen lernen können (2008) Piper Verlag GmbH, ISBN 978-3-89981-158-2.
- Bergsüchtig: Klettern und Abfahren in der Todeszone (2009) Piper Verlag GmbH, ISBN 978-3-492-40354-2.
- Malato di montagna (with A. Di Bello) (2009) Corbaccio, ISBN 978-88-7972-389-3.

== See also ==
- List of 20th-century summiters of Mount Everest
