= Thomas Scott Townsend =

Australian surveyor (1812–1869)

- Born: 27 April 1812; Medmenham, Buckinghamshire, England
- Died: 26 August 1869 (aged 57); Strand, London, England
- Occupation: Surveyor
- Known for: Extensive land surveying in early colonial New South Wales, Australia
- Notable work: Survey designs of many NSW towns, including Albury, Cooma, Wagga Wagga, and Yass; also, the first detailed survey of the Australian Alps

Thomas Scott Townsend (27 April 1812 – 26 August 1869) was one of the most eminent land surveyors of Australia's early colonial period. Focused on the south-eastern region of the continent, Townsend was responsible for producing surveys of many areas, including the original set-out details for many towns in New South Wales, including Albury and Wagga Wagga.

He also produced the first detailed survey of the Australian Alps, and was the first European colonist to actually stand atop Mount Kosciuszko, Australia's highest mountain. Australia's second highest mountain, Mount Townsend, was named after him.

== Early life and education ==
Thomas Scott Townsend was born on 27 April 1812 in the English county of Buckinghamshire on April 27, 1812 as the youngest of 11 children to Ann and William Townsend. They lived in this pastoral district to the north-west of London where William was a small landholder. After leaving schooling around the age of 15, Townsend is believed to have worked for his elder brother Joseph's surveying business and acquired there his foundational surveying skills.

It is likely that he left England for the Australian colony of New South Wales in March 1829 when 16 years old, sailing as a seaman's apprentice on the convict transport ship Waterloo.

== Surveying in Australia ==
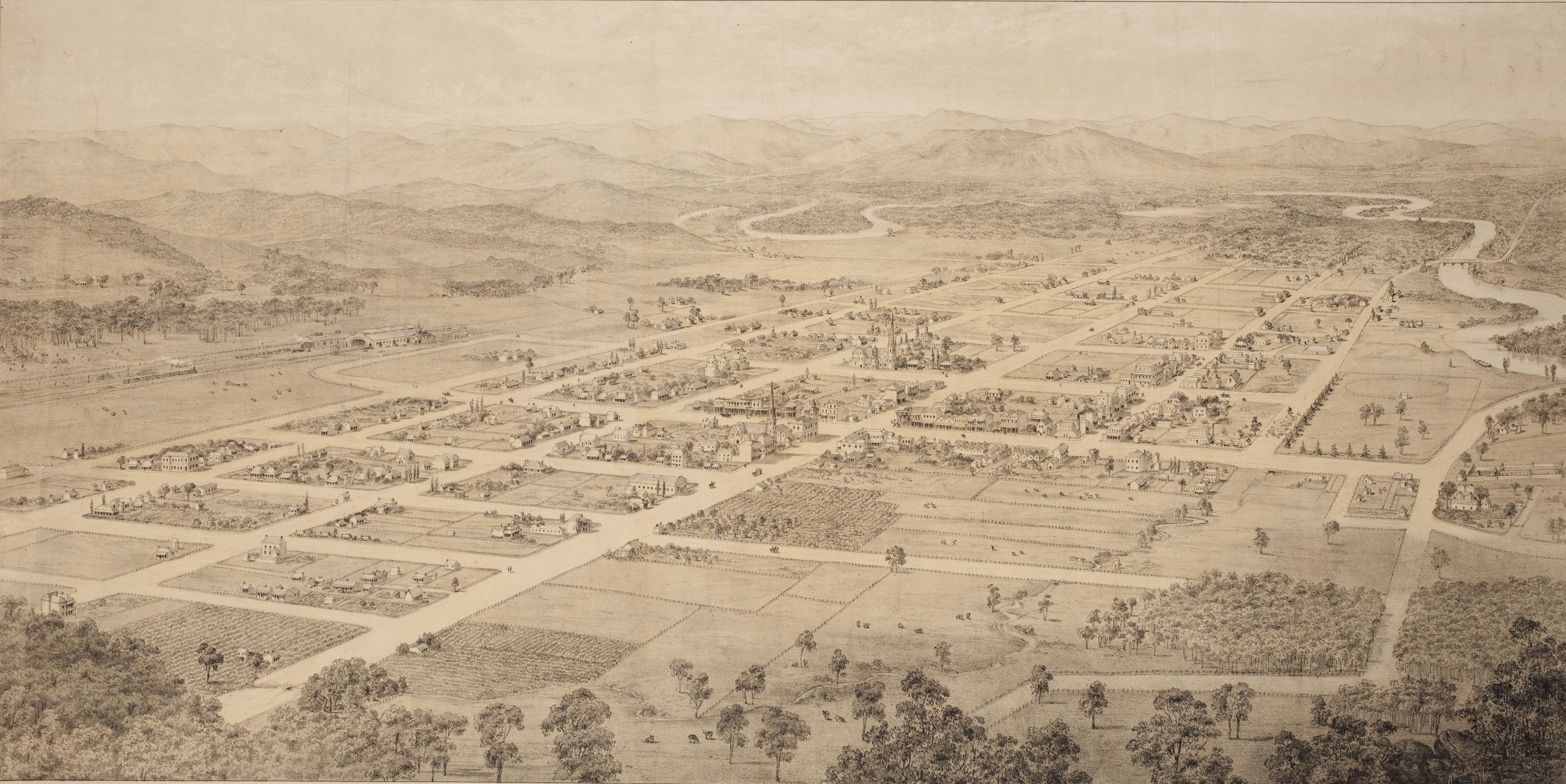
Albury township on the Murray River in 1881 (drawing), some 40 years after being positioned and set out by Townsend

Townsend obtained his initial surveying employment in the colony of New South Wales in April 1831 in the role of draftsman for the Surveyor General's Department. In 1836 he was promoted to the position of Assistant Surveyor, and in September 1839 was made Acting Surveyor-in-Charge of the Port Phillip District (later to become the Colony of Victoria).

Townsend produced prodigious survey data for the early Victorian and New South Wales colonial administrations, including the original set-out details for the nascent towns of Albury, Cooma, Eden, Wagga and Yass, among others.

He was responsible for producing the first detailed survey of the Australian Alps (Snowy Mountains), and was the first European colonist to actually stand atop Mount Kosciuszko, Australia's highest mountain.

In August 1845 Townsend relocated from Port Phillip to Sydney, where he was promoted to the senior position of Surveyor. His final position within the Colonial Administration was Acting Deputy Surveyor General, which he was appointed to in December 1853.

== Notable surveying achievements ==
Thomas Townsend established the location of, and/or performed the set-out for, the future Australian towns of:

(In Victoria)

- Alberton, Geelong (part), Portland, Port Albert and Port Fairy

(In New South Wales)

- Albury, Bombala, Cooma, Eden (Twofold Bay), Gunning, Pambula, Tumut, Wagga Wagga and Yass

Townsend surveyed, and produced detailed maps of, the route of the Murray River:

- From Limestone Creek east, including locating the Murray's easternmost source at Indi Springs (1846)
- From Albury west to Swan Hill (1848)
- From Albury east to Murray Gates / Youngal Range (1850)

Townsend performed long-distance overland "natural feature" surveys, and produced detailed maps of:

- South-western Victoria from Melbourne to Portland Bay (1839-1840)
- South-eastern Victorian coast from Wilsons Promontory to Port Albert (1841)
- The first route through Victorian Gippsland, from Port Albert to Cooma, New South Wales (1842)
- South-eastern New South Wales coast from Moruya to Cape Howe (1843)
- The Australian Snowy Mountains (Great Dividing Range) from Dead Horse Gap south to the Cobberas (1846), and north to Mount Jagungal (1847)
- The Monaro District (1843)
- The Riverina District (1847)

== Return to England and death ==
Beginning in early 1854, Townsend showed signs of a developing mental illness which was to lead to him requesting extended leave from his surveying duties. He officially retired his Government position in early 1857 due to ill health, and soon after returned to England. There he lived in seclusion for a number of years, greatly afflicted by paranoia, before dying by suicide in London on 26 August 1869.

== Naming of Mount Townsend ==
Australia's second highest mountain, summit elevation 2,209 metres (7,247 ft), was given the name "Mount Townsend" in 1885 by the Austrian alpinist Robert von Lendenfeld. While it is not believed to have been climbed by Townsend, Mount Townsend is located in a short side spur just 2 kilometres (1.2 mi) west of the Main Range section of the Great Dividing Range that was surveyed by Townsend in 1847.

== See also ==
- History of Australia
- Surveying in Australia
