= Mount Twynam =

Mountain in New South Wales, Australia

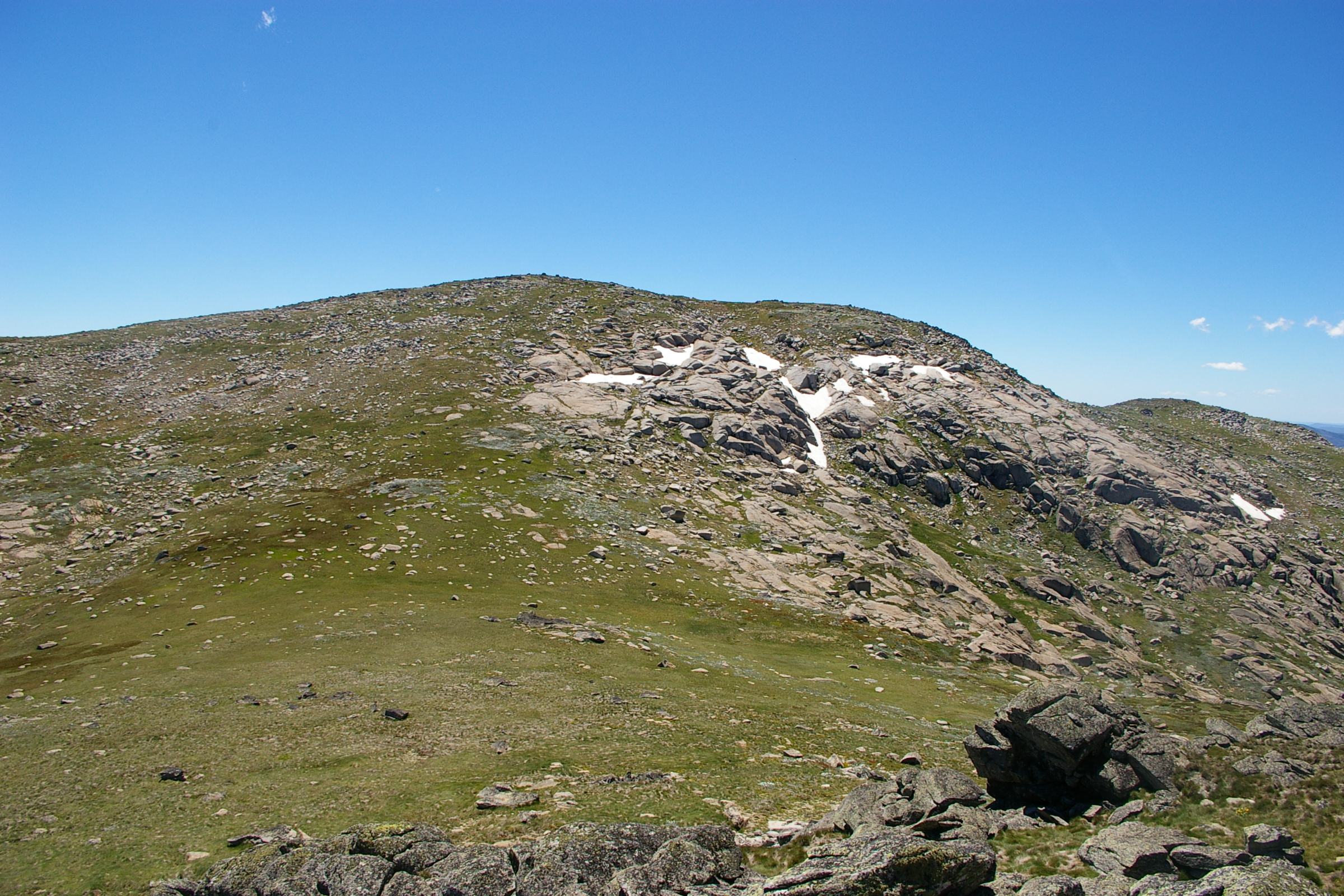
- Mount Twynam as seen from the top of Little Twynam.

Highest point
- Elevation: 2,195 m (7,201 ft)
- Prominence: 155 m (509 ft)
- Isolation: 6.03 km (3.75 mi)
- Listing: Seven Third Summits (Note: If only Australia is included (Bass list))
- Coordinates: 36°23′36″S 148°18′53″E

Geography
- Location within New South Wales
- Location: Snowy Mountains, New South Wales, Australia
- Parent range: Main Range, Great Dividing Range

Climbing
- Easiest route: Walk (track)

Mount Twynam is a mountain located on the Main Range, part of the Great Dividing Range, in the Snowy Mountains in New South Wales, Australia. The mountain is located close the border between New South Wales and Victoria.

With an elevation of 2,195 metres (7,201 ft) above sea level, Mount Twynam is the 3rd-highest mountain on mainland Australia. It is located 8 kilometres (5.0 mi) north-east of Mount Kosciuszko.

The mountain is large but unimposing, and has good and far-reaching views over Blue Lake Cirque and the Western Falls. Despite being relatively accessible by track, it is rarely visited. The mountain forms a watershed for the Snowy River to the southeast and the Geehi River to the northwest.

== Gallery ==
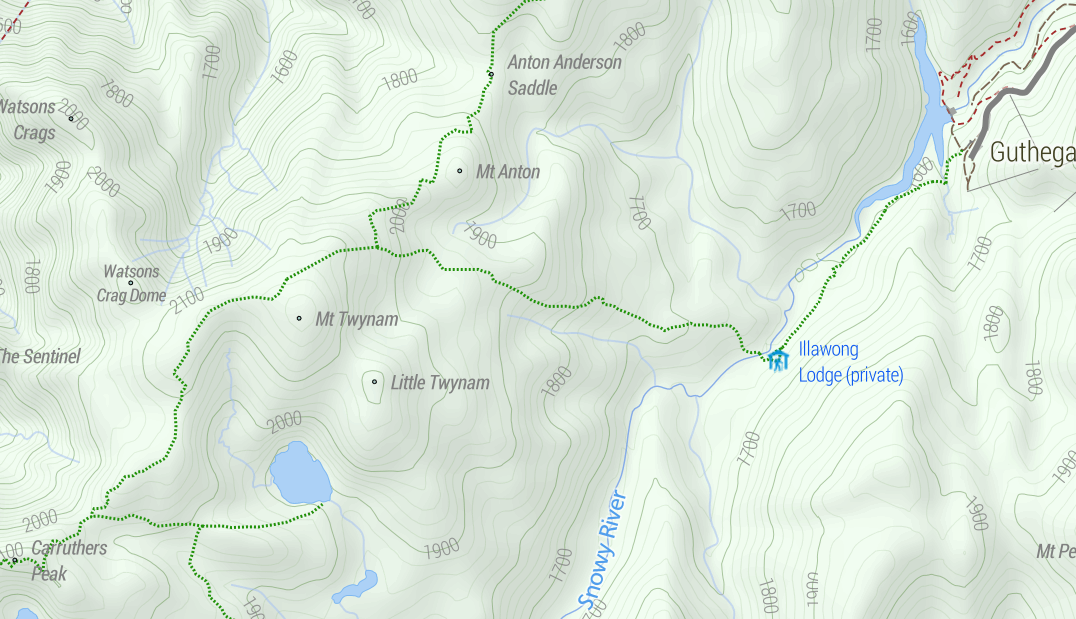
Topographic map of Mount Twynam.

== See also ==
- Australian Alps
- List of mountains of Australia § New South Wales
