= Mawenzi =

Volcanic core in Tanzania

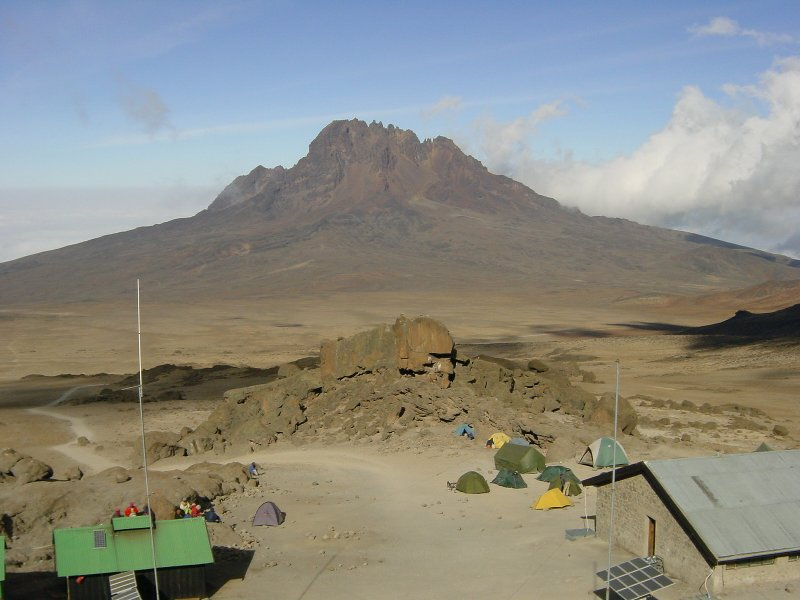

Highest point
- Elevation: 5,149 m (16,893 ft)
- Prominence: 849 m (2,785 ft)
- Listing: Seven Third Summits
- Coordinates: 3°5′33″S 37°27′21″E

Geography

Climbing
- First ascent: 29 July 1912 by Eduard Hans Oehler and Fritz Klute

Mawenzi is the second-tallest volcanic cone of the Kilimanjaro massif in Tanzania, located east of Kilimanjaro's main summit. It rises to an elevation of 5,149 metres (16,893 ft) and has a prominence of 849 metres (2,785 ft), making it the third-highest peak in Africa after Kilimanjaro's main summit and Mount Kenya. As such, it is counted as one of the Seven Third Summits, the third-highest peaks on each continent. Mawenzi is an extinct volcanic cone, unlike Kilimanjaro's main cone (Kibo), which is currently dormant but may become active again.

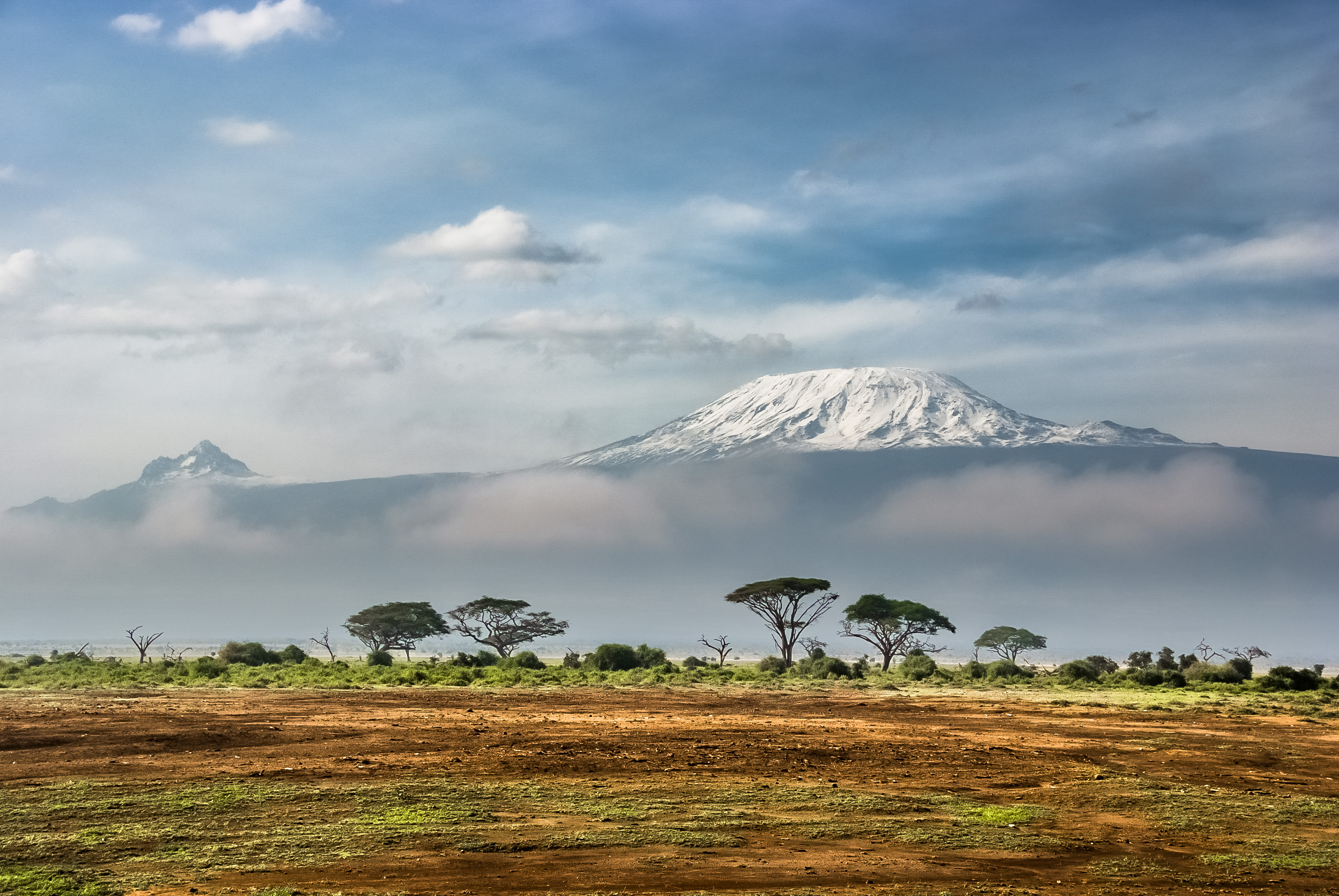
Kilimanjaro as seen from Amboseli National Park. Mawenzi is the smaller peak visible to the left of Kibo, the main peak.

== Climbing ==
Mawenzi was first climbed on 29 July 1912 by Germans Eduard Hans Oehler and Fritz Klute.

Unlike the traditional routes to Uhuru Peak on Kibo, which are open to the general public, climbing Mawenzi requires a special permit from the Tanzania National Parks Authority. These permits are issued exclusively to experienced climbers with appropriate equipment. Climbing on Mawenzi is limited to a maximum of two climbers at a time and is restricted to daytime hours.
