= Seven Third Summits =

Third highest mountains of each continent

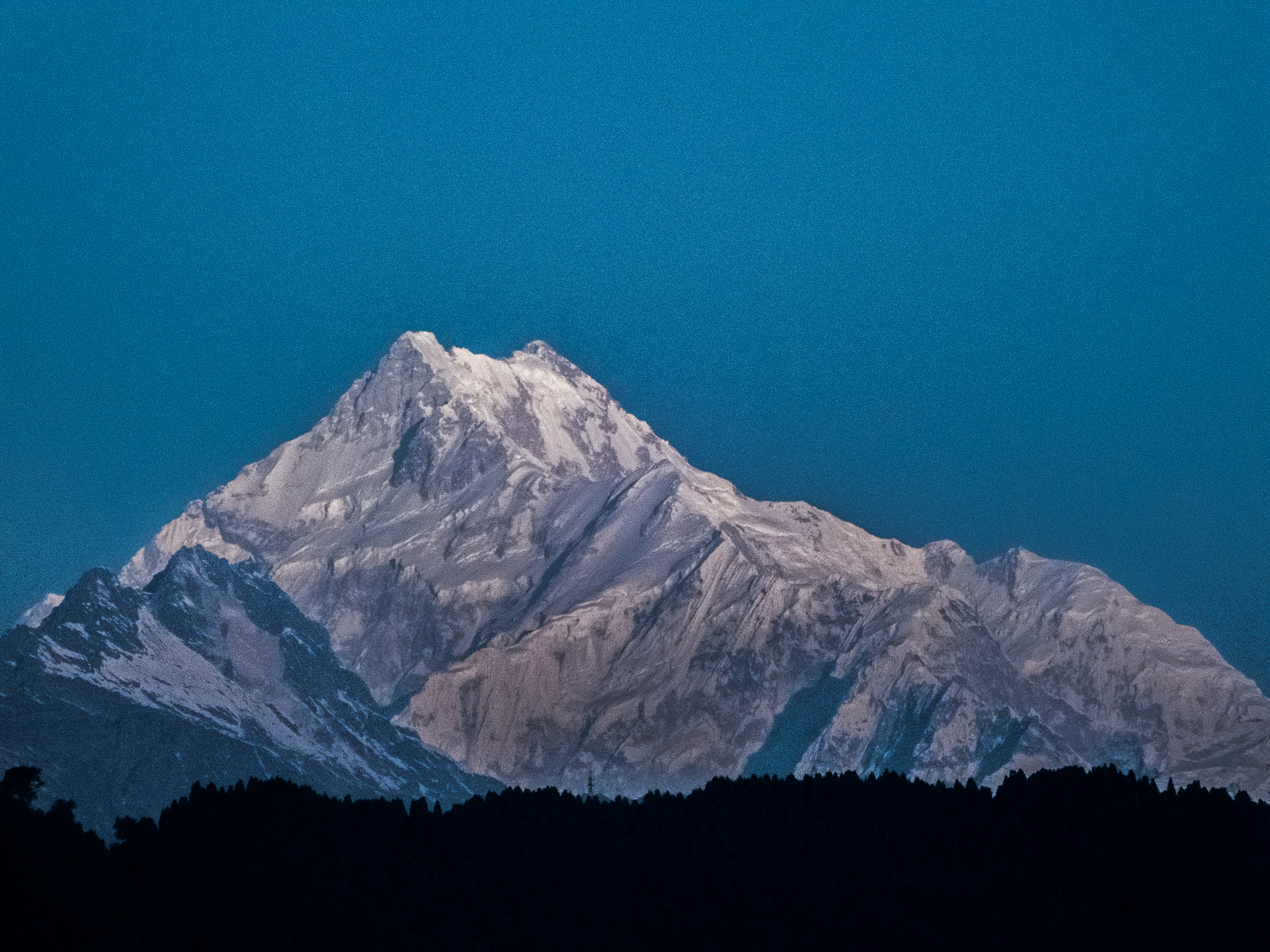
Kanchenjunga is the world's third highest mountain

The Seven Third Summits are the third-highest mountains of each of the seven continents. All of these mountain peaks are separate peaks rather than a sub-peak of the continents' high point. Christian Stangl from Austria became the first person to reach the summit of all seven third summit mountains after climbing Puncak Mandala and Puncak Trikora. He did this as a part of his "Triple Seven Summits" project, the three highest peaks of every continent. Because of glacial melting and the disagreement over exactly which three peaks are the tallest in the Australian continent, Stangl also climbed several additional candidate peaks including Sumantri (4,870 m (15,978 ft)), Ngga Pulu (4,862 m (15,951 ft)), and Mount Twynam (2,195 m (7,201 ft)).

== Definitions ==
The definition of continent is a matter of some dispute among mountaineers seeking to complete this challenge.

The main ridge of the Greater Caucasus range is generally considered to form the boundary between Asia and Europe. In that case, Mount Elbrus (5,642 m (18,510 ft)) and Dykh-Tau (5,205 m (17,077 ft)), are the two highest mountains in Europe. Excluding the Caucasus Mountains, Mont Blanc (4,808 m (15,774 ft)) and Monte Rosa (4,634 m (15,203 ft)) would be Europe's two highest mountains.

The Australian continent is defined as comprising the mainland of Australia and proximate islands on the same continental shelf, including Tasmania and New Guinea. In the convention of the seven continents, one of the continents is the region of Australasia, which includes for example the mountainous islands of New Zealand. For both the geological and conventional continent, New Guinea's Puncak Jaya / Carstensz Pyramid (4,884 m (16,024 ft)) and Puncak Mandala (4,760 m (15,617 ft)) are the two highest summits. When considering a continent as a continuous landmass surrounded by oceans, mainland Australia would be its own continent, with Mount Kosciuszko (2,228 m (7,310 ft)) and Mount Townsend (2,209 m (7,247 ft)) as its two highest summits.

=== Bass and Messner list ===
The Third Seven Summits list follows the Seven Summits list created by Richard Bass, who chose the highest mountain of mainland Australia, Mount Kosciuszko (2,228 m (7,310 ft)), to represent the Australian continent's highest summit. Reinhold Messner proposed another list (the Messner or Carstensz list) replacing Mount Kosciuszko with Western New Guinea's Puncak Jaya (4,884 m (16,024 ft)), which is part of Indonesia.

Following the Bass list, Mount Twynam is the third-highest summit (2,196 m (7,205 ft)) in Australia. According to the Messner list, Puncak Mandala (4,760 m) on New Guinea is the third-highest of the Australian continent. SRTM data do support Puncak Mandala being taller than Puncak Trikora. Heights of mountain peaks in West Papua are poorly established.

Both lists consider the Caucasus Mountains as European. This makes Shkhara (5,193 m (17,037 ft)), located on the border between Georgia and Russia, the third-highest summit in Europe. Those who exclude the Caucasus Mountains from Europe, regard the Dom (4,545 m (14,911 ft)), located in Switzerland, as Europe's third-highest summit.

Seven Third Summits (sorted by elevation)
Peak	Bass list	Messner list	Elevation	Prominence	Isolation	Continent	Range	Country
Kangchenjunga	✔	✔	8,586 m (28,169 ft)	3,922 m (12,867 ft)	124.32 km (77.25 mi)	Asia	Himalayas	India / Nepal
Monte Pissis	✔	✔	6,793 m (22,287 ft)	2,143 m (7,031 ft)	75.9 km (47.2 mi)	South America	Andes	Argentina
Pico de Orizaba	✔	✔	5,636 m (18,491 ft)	4,922 m (16,148 ft)	2,690.14 km (1,671.58 mi)	North America	Cordillera Neovolcanica	Mexico
Shkhara	✔	✔	5,193 m (17,037 ft)	1,357 m (4,452 ft)	6.02 km (3.74 mi)	Europe	Caucasus	Georgia / Russia
Mawenzi	✔	✔	5,149 m (16,893 ft)	849 m (2,785 ft)	11.07 km (6.88 mi)	Africa	-	Tanzania
Mount Shinn	✔	✔	4,661 m (15,292 ft)	961 m (3,153 ft)	6.55 km (4.07 mi)	Antarctica	Sentinel	-
Puncak Mandala		✔	4,760 m (15,617 ft)	1,268 m (4,160 ft)	167.29 km (103.95 mi)	Australia (continent)	Maoke	Indonesia
Mount Twynam	✔		2,195 m (7,201 ft)	155 m (509 ft)	6.03 km (3.75 mi)	Australia	Snowies	Australia

== See also ==
- Seven Summits
- Seven Second Summits
- Volcanic Seven Summits
- Three Poles Challenge
- Explorers Grand Slam, also known as The Adventurers Grand Slam
- Eight-thousander
