= Mount Townsend (Snowy Mountains) =

Mountain in New South Wales, Australia

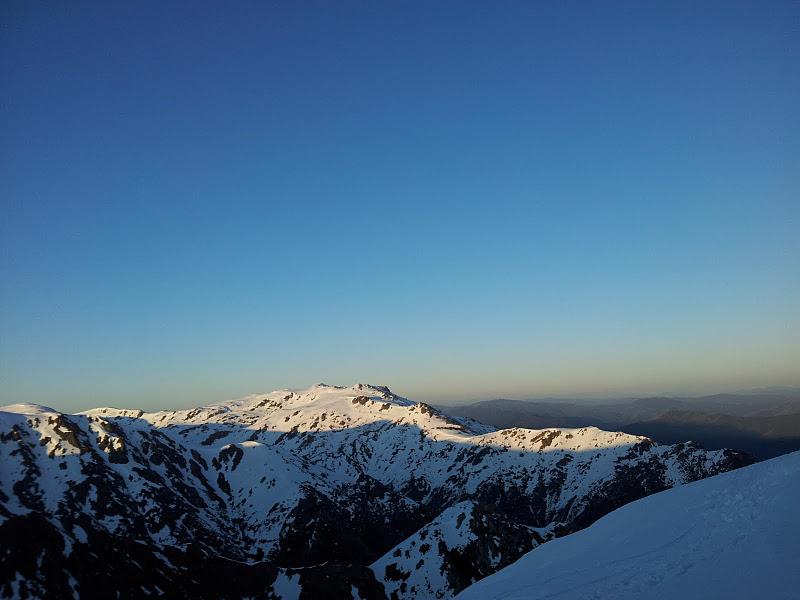
- Dawn on Mount Townsend, viewed from Watsons Crags, October 2011.

Highest point
- Elevation: 2,209 m (7,247 ft)
- Prominence: 189 m (620 ft)
- Isolation: 3.71 km (2.31 mi)
- Listing: Seven Second Summits
- Coordinates: 36°25′21″S 148°15′32″E

Naming
- Etymology: Thomas Scott Townsend

Geography
- Location within New South Wales
- Location: Snowy Mountains, New South Wales, Australia
- Parent range: Main Range, Great Dividing Range
- Topo map: Youngal

Climbing
- Easiest route: Hike or ski

Mount Townsend is a mountain in the Main Range of the Great Dividing Range, located in the Snowy Mountains region of New South Wales, Australia.

== History ==
Mount Townsend was named after the eminent surveyor Thomas Scott Townsend, so named in 1885 by Austrian alpinist Robert von Lendenfeld.

There was some confusion on the historical identification of the summits named as Mount Kosciuszko and Mount Townsend for some time, which was clarified in 1940 by B. T. Dowd, a cartographer and historian of the NSW Lands Department. His study reaffirmed that the mountain named by Strzelecki as Mount Kosciuszko was indeed, as the NSW maps had always shown, Australia's highest summit. When James Macarthur's field book of the historical journey was published in 1941 by C. Daley it further confirmed Dowd's clarification. This means that "Targangil", mentioned in Spencer's 1885 letter to The Sydney Morning Herald, was the Aboriginal Australian name of Mount Townsend, not of Mount Kosciuszko.

== Geography ==
With an elevation of 2,209 metres (7,247 ft) above sea level, Mount Townsend is the second-highest peak of mainland Australia. Located in Kosciuszko National Park, the mountain is 3.68 kilometres (2.29 mi) north of Australia's highest mainland peak, Mount Kosciuszko,, with an elevation only 19 m (62 ft) lower. (Note: Mount Townsend has a prominence of only 189 m (620 ft), which is relatively low compared to other mountains worldwide. By stricter prominence cut-off points, the most common of which being the 300 m (980 ft) prominence rule, Townsend would not be classified as its own mountain, and instead a subsidiary peak. Due to Australia's much flatter topography than all other continents, a prominence cut-off point of 300m is almost never used, cartographers opting instead for less strict definitions, such as 50 m (160 ft) or 100 m (330 ft) when classifying peaks. If using the 300m rule, this makes Mount Bogong in Victoria the second highest mountain.)

== See also ==
- Australian Alps
- List of mountains of Australia
- Second Seven Summits
