= Puncak Trikora =

Mountain in Indonesia on New Guinea

- Wilhelminatop / Ettiakup
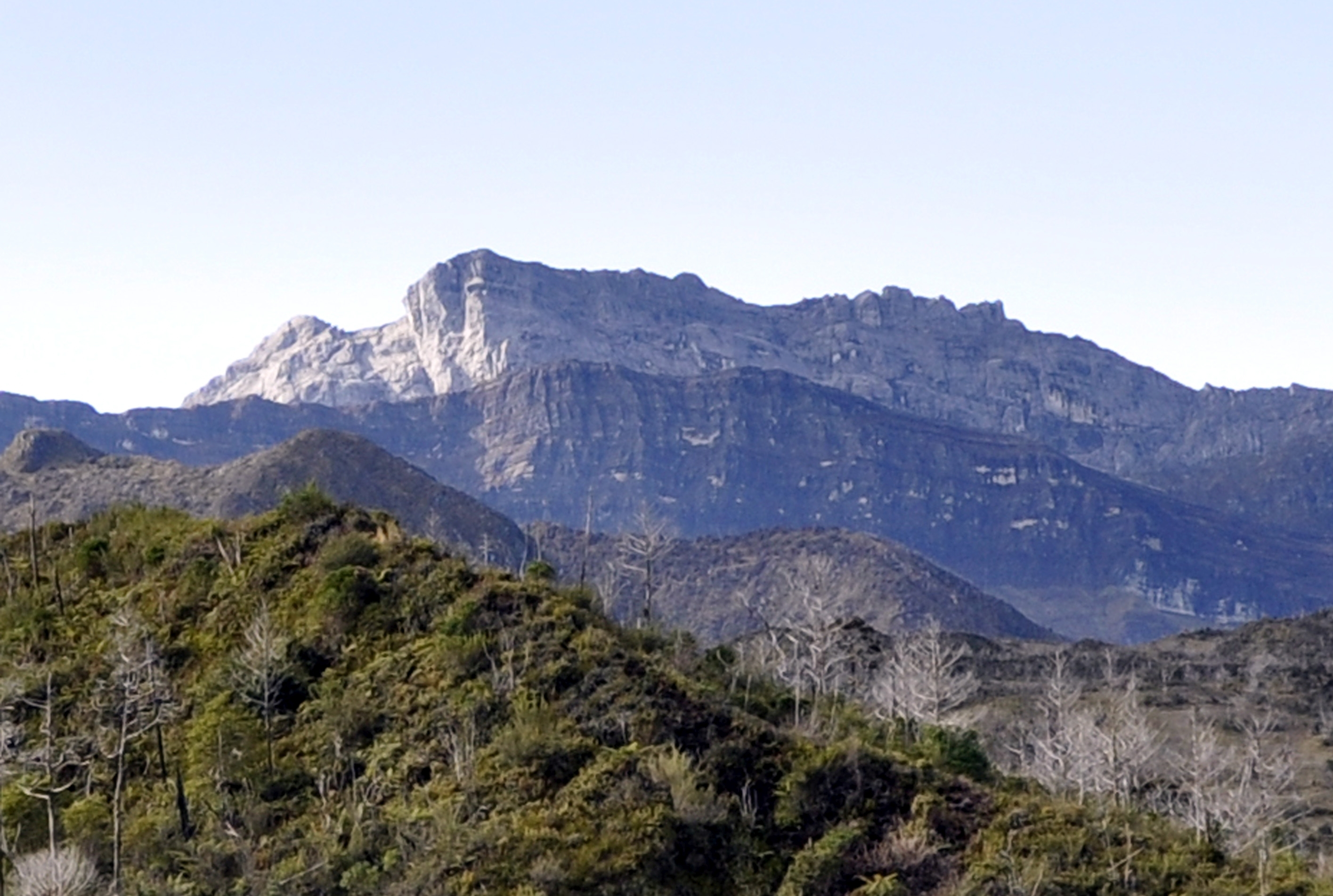
- Puncak Trikora from north. Main summit (center left) and west ridge (right)

Highest point
- Elevation: 4,750 m (15,580 ft)
- Prominence: 1,268 m (4,160 ft)
- Listing: Seven Third Summits (Note: If the Indonesian portion of New Guinea is included in Oceania (Messner list))
- Coordinates: 4°15′44″S 138°40′54″E

Geography
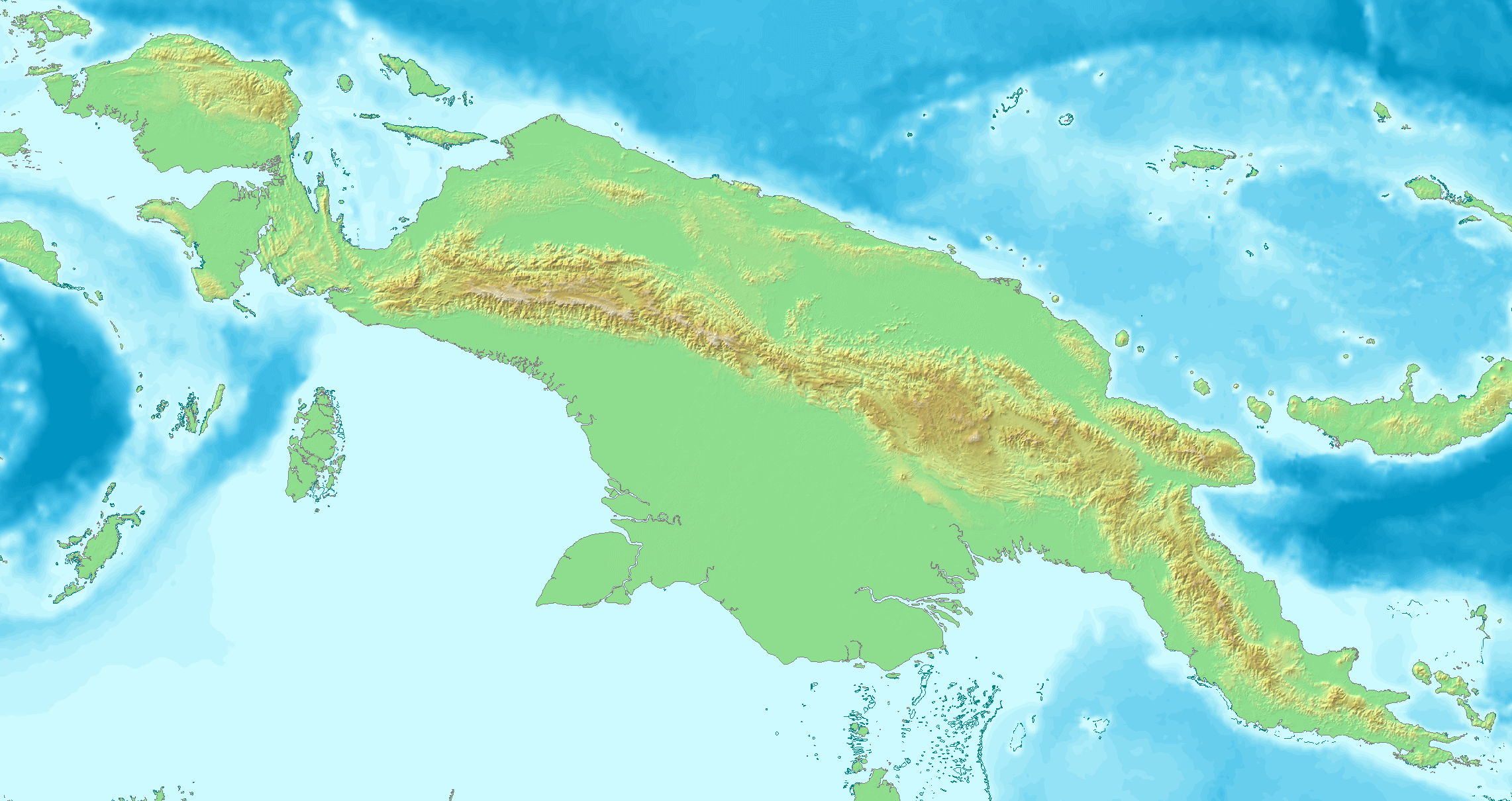
- Location within Western New Guinea Location within Indonesia Location within New Guinea
- Location: Highland Papua, Indonesia
- Parent range: Maoke Mountains

Climbing
- First ascent: 21 February 1913 by Alphons Franssen Herderschee, Paul Hubrecht and Gerard Versteeg

Puncak Trikora (Indonesian: [ˈpuntʃak triˈkɔra]; literally "People's Triple Command Peak") is a 4,730-metre (15,518 ft) or 4,750-metre-high (15,584 ft) mountain in the Highland Papua province of Indonesia on New Guinea. It lies in the eastern part of the Sudirman (Nassau) Range of the Maoke Mountains.

Behind Puncak Jaya (Carstensz Pyramid) at 4,884 m (16,024 ft), it is either the second or third highest mountain on the island of New Guinea and the Australasian continent. As such it appears on some Seven Second Summits lists, although SRTM-data support that Puncak Mandala (Juliana Peak) in the Jayawijaya (Orange) Range is higher at 4,760 m (15,617 ft). (Note: See for example the lists at peaklist, peakbagger.com, and gunungbagging.com) (Note: Several other summits of Mount Carstensz besides Carstensz Pyramid, like Ngga Pulu (4,862 m) and Carstensz East (4,820 or 4,840 m) are higher than both Mandala and Trikora, but because of their low prominence (200-300 m) and isolation (2.2-2.6 km) these are usually not regarded as separate mountains.)

== Name ==
The Dani living near lake Habbema call the mountain Ettiakup. Around 1905 the mountain was named Wilhelminatop, or "Wilhelmina Peak," after the Dutch Queen Wilhelmina. When Indonesia obtained control of West New Guinea in 1963 it changed the name of the mountain to Puncak Trikora, after the Trikora (Tri Komando Rakyat, "People’s Triple Command") speech by Sukarno given in December 1961 at a mass meeting in Yogyakarta. The three commands were: to defeat the formation of an independent state of West Papua, raise the Indonesian flag in that country, and be ready for mobilization at any time.

== Glaciation ==
At the beginning of the 20th century all the highest mountains in New Guinea, including Puncak Jaya (Carstensz Pyramid), Puncak Mandala (Juliana Peak), Ngga Pilimsit (Idenburg), and Puncak Trikora (Wilhelmina Peak), were covered by glaciers. The first expeditions to the Maoke Mountains documented a strong recent retreat of all glaciers in the area. The ice cap of Puncak Trikora melted between 1936 and 1962. In 1909 the ice cap still reached as low as 4,400 m (14,436 ft).

== Geology ==
Puncak Trikora is a high point on the central range (Sudirman (Nassau) Range), which was created in the late Miocene Melanesian orogeny, caused by an oblique collision between the Australian and Pacific plates and is made of middle Miocene limestones.

== History ==
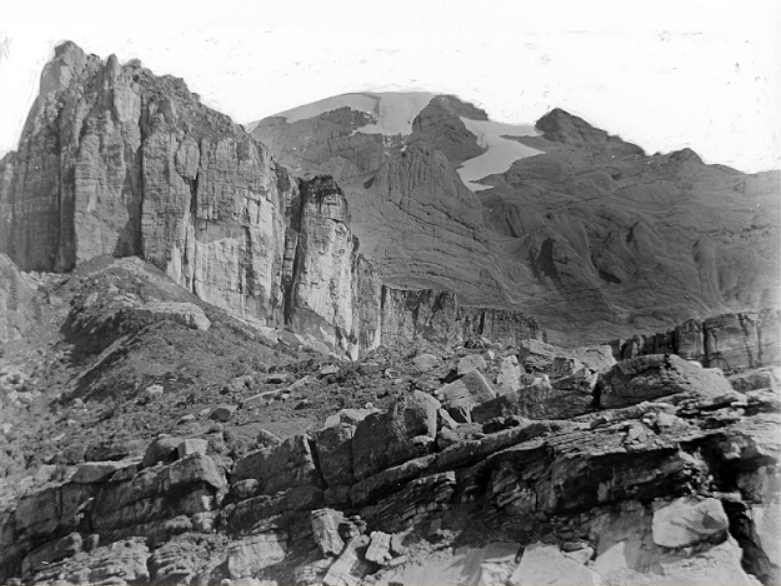
Wilhelminatop (Wilhelmina Peak), 1913 from south by P. F. Hubrecht

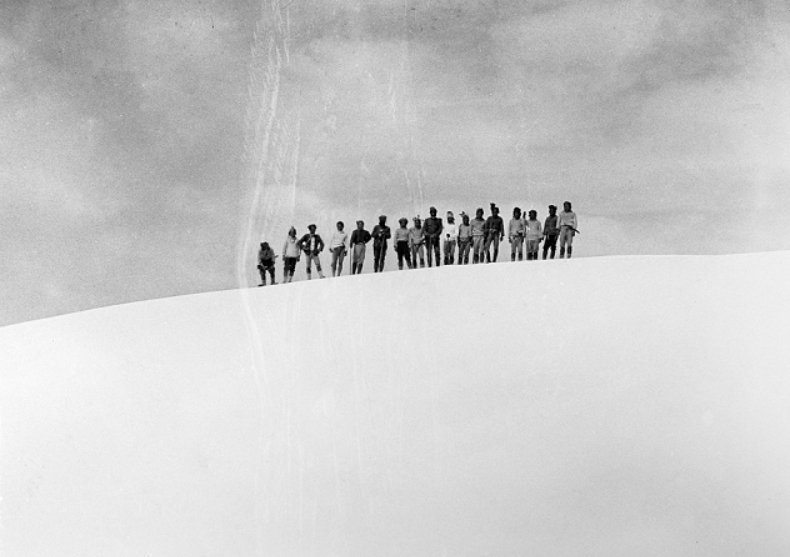
On the summit of Wilhelminatop, first ascent 21 February 1913. By Alphons Franssen Herderschee

The navigable Noord River made the mountain more accessible than the other snow-covered peaks of Dutch New Guinea and the Dutch organized a series of scientific expeditions in the early 20th century to reach the equatorial eternal snow and climb the mountain. The leader of the first two expeditions was the diplomat and amateur biologist H.A. Lorentz. Each expedition was accompanied by soldiers, porters, and Dayaks, who were employed for their expertise with boat journeys.

In July 1907, the first expedition established Camp Alkmaar near where the Noord River, since 1910 known as the Lorentz River, became unnavigable (4°40′S 138°42′E), but was unsuccessful in penetrating the highest mountain range. The Second South New Guinea Expedition also used Camp Alkmaar, from where it left on October 9, 1909. A group of nine, including Lorentz and Jan Willem van Nouhuys, were the first to reach the eternal snow of New Guinea at a height of 4,460 m (14,633 ft) on November 8, 1909. From the ridge, they observed a large lake to the north, which Lorentz named Lake Habbema (4°08′S 138°40′E), after a member of the expedition. No attempt was made to reach the Wilhelmina summit. The return trip was severe; with the loss of four expedition members, the explorers finally returned to Camp Alkmaar in mid-December.

The summit was first reached in 1913 during the Third South New Guinea Expedition, which lasted from September 1912 to April 1913 and followed the same route. It was led by Alphons Franssen Herderschee, an officer of the Royal Netherlands East Indies Army, and it aimed to research the soils, flora, and fauna of the region that lay above 2,300 metres. Other expedition members were the zoologist Gerard Martinus Versteeg, the botanist August Adriaan Pulle, the geologist Paul François Hubrecht, and J.B. Sitanala, an Indonesian GP. Herderschee also took over the role of ethnographer. Including soldiers, porters, and Dayaks, the baggage train had 241 members. They were divided up into several groups to carry out the different tasks in a time-effective way. Herderschee, Hubrecht, and Versteeg formed the summit team, which reached the Wilhelminatop on 21 February 1913.

The 1920-1922 Central New Guinea Expedition had as its goal to reach the mountain from the north coast over a route partially explored in a 1914 military expedition. On February 7, 1920, the first exploration, under the leadership of A.J.A. van Overeem started at the mouth of the Mamberamo and followed the Idenburg River. In October, they had climbed across the Doorman Mtns and reached the upper Swart Valley (now Toli Valley). Here they made first contact with the Lani people (a.k.a. the Western Dani people), an agricultural people with whom they stayed for six weeks. Running out of time and food provisions, this expedition returned without climbing Wilhelmina.

A follow-up expedition starting in June 1921 and led by J.H.G. Kremer, who was a surveyor the previous year, retraced the route, and via the upper Baliem Valley and Lake Habbema reached the summit on 4 December 1921. Among the ascendants was Paul Hubrecht, who had been on the top in 1913 and noticed that the ice cap had retreated considerably since 8 years before.

== See also ==
- List of highest mountains of New Guinea
- List of Southeast Asian mountains
- Puncak Jaya
- Puncak Mandala
