= State 8 =

Highest 8 Australian mountain peaks

The State 8 is a peakbagging list of the highest peaks in each of Australia's states:

- Mount Kosciuszko (Kunama Namadgi) in New South Wales (2,228 metres or 7,310 feet)
- Mount Bogong (Warkwoolowler) in Victoria (1,986 metres or 6,516 feet)
- Bimberi Peak in the Australian Capital Territory (1,911 metres or 6,270 feet)
- Mount Ossa in Tasmania (1,617 metres or 5,305 feet)
- Mount Bartle Frere (Choorechillum) in Queensland (1,611 metres or 5,285 feet)
- Mount Zeil (Urlatherrke) in the Northern Territory (1,531 metres or 5,023 feet)
- Mount Meharry (Wirlbiwirlbi) in Western Australia (1,249 metres or 4,098 feet)
- Ngarutjaranya (Mount Woodroffe) in South Australia (1,435 metres or 4,708 feet)

As of October 2024, it is confirmed Ngarutjaranya cannot be climbed anymore as no more permits to climb it are issued by the APY lands (Aṉangu Pitjantjatjara Yankunytjatjara).
