= Dykh-Tau =

Mountain in Kabardino-Balkaria, Russia

Gora Dykh-Tau
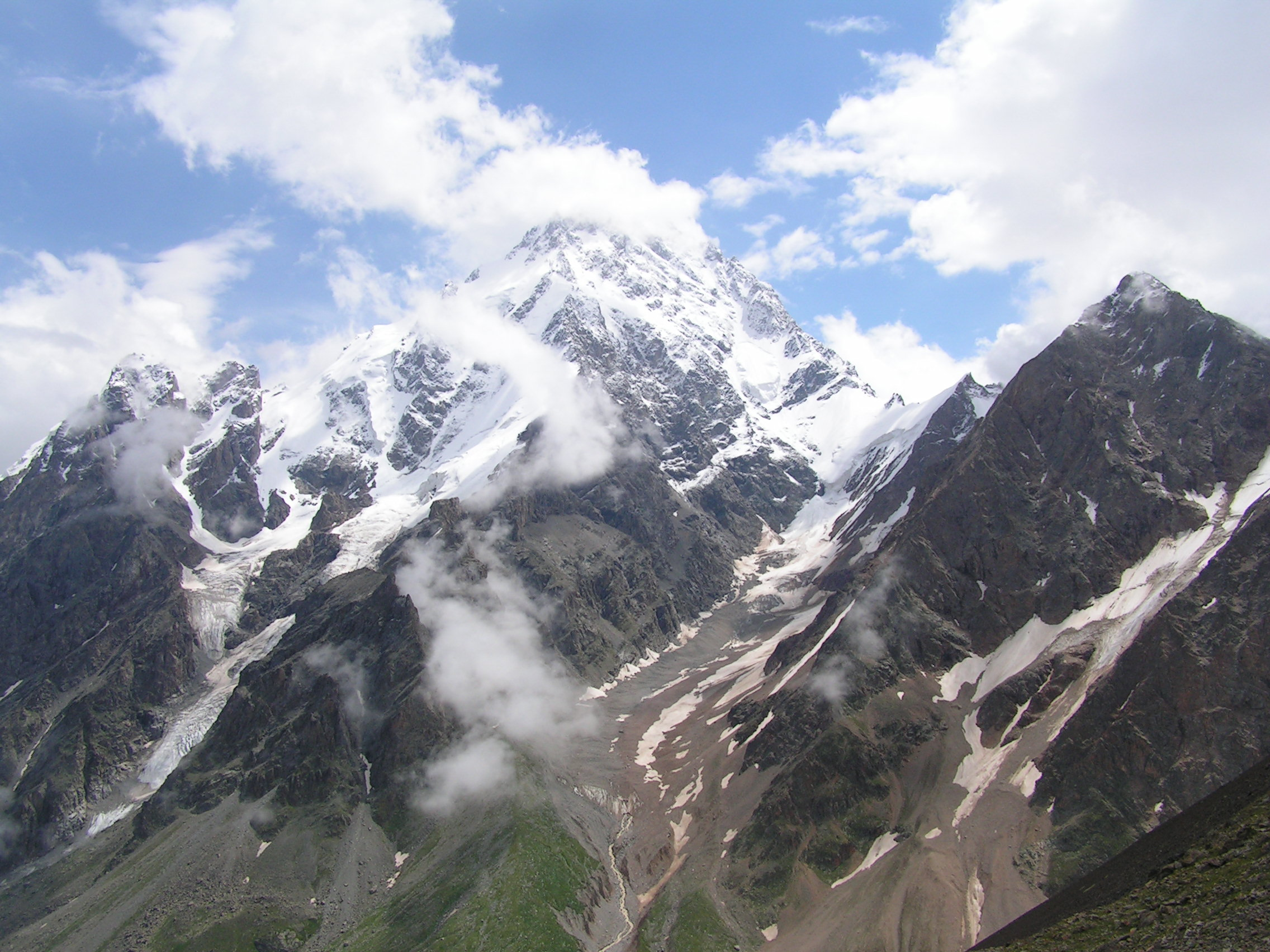

Highest point
- Elevation: 5,205 m (17,077 ft)
- Prominence: 2,002 m (6,568 ft)
- Listing: Seven Second Summits; Ultra
- Coordinates: 43°3′N 43°8′E

Geography
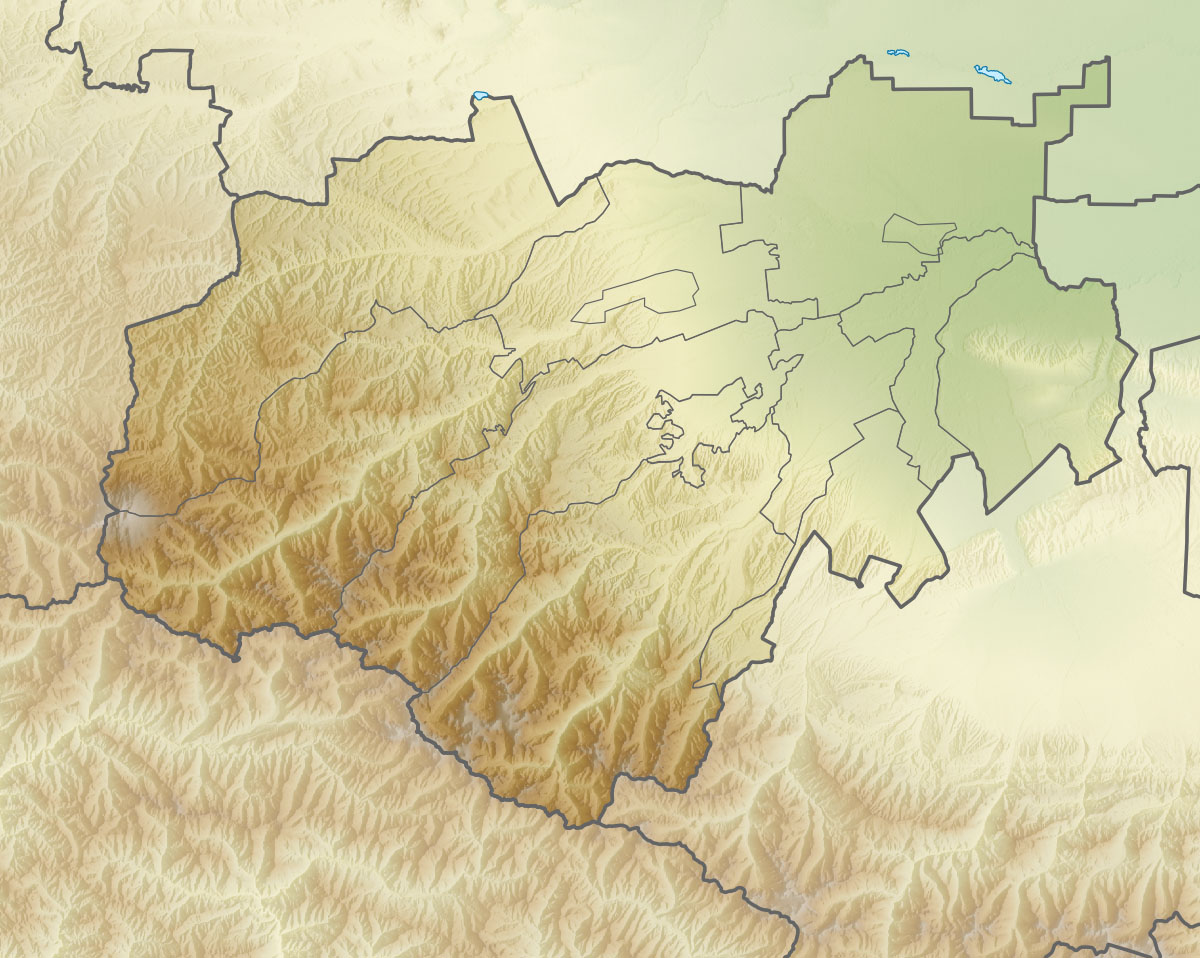
- Location within Caucasus Mountains Location within Kabardino-Balkaria
- Location: Kabardino-Balkaria, Russia
- Country: Russia
- Parent range: Lateral Range; Caucasus Mountains
- Topo map(s): Map and Guide to the Caucasus: Bezingi, Bashil, Adaikhokh

Dykh-Tau or Dykhtau (Russian: Дыхтау; Karachay-Balkar: Дых тау, romanized: Dıx taw, derived from Turkic "dik dagh" which means 'Jagged Mount'), is the second-highest mountain in Russia and Europe with an elevation of 5,205 m (17,077 ft) above sea level. It is located in Kabardino-Balkaria, Russia; its peak standing about 5 km (3 mi) north of the border with Georgia.

== Access ==
Dykh-Tau is best accessed from the north (Russia). Bezingi village may be reached from Nalchik in Kabardino-Balkaria with infrequent public transport, here a 4WD vehicle must be hired. Thus Bezingi Alpine Camp is reached at 2,180 meters (7,150 ft). From here it takes a further 2 days to reach the base of the climb.

== Climbing routes ==
This is one of the Caucasian Peaks, facing the Bezingi Wall across the Bezingi Glacier. The first ascent in 1888 by Albert Mummery and Heinrich Zurfluh of Meiringen was a major achievement at the time. Their route up the SW Ridge is no longer used as the normal route which is now the North Ridge graded 4B (Russian Grading). They were two weeks ahead of another successful summit team led by Henry William Holder.

Starting from Misses Kosh the ridge is accessed by crossing the West Ridge of Misses-Tau then continuing to the Russian Bivouac located by a hanging glacier descending from the North Ridge of Dykhtau, 4 hours from Misses-Kosh. Once a notch between Misses-Tau and Dykhtau is gained, the North Ridge is followed to the summit. Allow 2 and a half days from the Russian Bivouac, there are several good bivouac sites on the North Ridge (Details and map).

== Mapping ==
Various Soviet military maps annotated in the Cyrillic script can found on the internet; two of the maps cover the Dykhtau area.

== See also ==
- List of ultras of West Asia
