= Seven Second Summits =

Second-highest mountains on each continent

Location of some of the Seven Second Summits. In this map, Puncak Trikora is indicated, though Puncak Mandala is widely recognised as the taller summit.

The Seven Second Summits are the second-highest mountains of each of the seven continents. All of these mountains are separate peaks rather than a sub-peak of the continents' high point. The Seven Second Summits are considered a harder challenge than the traditional Seven Summits.

== Definitions ==
Comparison the Seven Second Summits with the Seven Summits and Eight-thousanders.

What constitutes a continent is a matter of some dispute among mountaineers seeking to complete this challenge. The main ridge of the Greater Caucasus range is generally considered to form the boundary between Europe and Asia. In that case, Mount Elbrus, (5,642 m (18,510 ft)) situated some 10 km north of the continental divide, is the highest mountain in Europe. Excluding the Caucasus Mountains, Mont Blanc (4,808 m (15,774 ft)) would be Europe's highest mountain.

The Australian continent is defined as comprising the mainland of Australia and proximate islands on the same continental shelf, including Tasmania and New Guinea. In the convention of the seven continents, one of the continents is the region of Australasia, which includes, for example, the mountainous islands of New Zealand.

For both the geological and conventional continent, New Guinea's Carstensz Pyramid (4,884 m (16,024 ft)) is the highest summit. When considering a continent as a continuous landmass surrounded by oceans, mainland Australia would be its own continent, with Mount Kosciuszko (2,228 m (7,310 ft)) as its highest summit.

=== Bass and Messner lists ===
The Seven Second Summits list follows the Seven Summits list from Richard Bass, which uses Mount Kosciuszko (2,228 m) to represent the Australian continent's highest summit. Reinhold Messner proposed another list (the Messner or Carstensz list), replacing Mount Kosciuszko with Western New Guinea's Carstensz Pyramid, which is part of Indonesia (4,884 m). Following the Bass list, Mount Townsend is the second-highest summit (2,209 m) in Australia. According to the Messner list, Puncak Mandala (4,760 m) on New Guinea is the second highest of the Australian continent. Heights of mountain peaks in West Papua are poorly established, and Puncak Trikora has been listed as the second-highest summit on the island, but SRTM data do support a higher elevation for Mandala.

Both lists count Mount Elbrus as the highest peak in Europe. This makes Dykh-Tau (5,205 m), located in Russia, the second-highest summit in Europe. Those who consider Mont Blanc to be the highest mountain in Europe would consider Monte Rosa (4,634 m), located between Switzerland and Italy, to be the second-highest summit.

Seven Second Summits (sorted by elevation)
Peak	Bass list	Messner list	Elevation	Prominence	Continent	Range	Country	Coordinates
K2	✔	✔	8,611 m (28,251 ft)	4,017 m (13,179 ft)	Asia	Karakoram	Pakistan / China	35.8811°N 76.5133°E
Ojos del Salado	✔	✔	6,893 m (22,615 ft)	3,688 m (12,100 ft)	South America	Andes	Argentina / Chile	27.1097°S 68.5414°W
Mount Logan	✔	✔	5,959 m (19,551 ft)	5,250 m (17,224 ft)	North America	Saint Elias	Canada	60.5672°N 140.4028°W
Dykh-Tau	✔	✔	5,205 m (17,077 ft)	2,002 m (6,568 ft)	Europe	Caucasus	Russia	43.0525°N 43.1317°E
Mount Kenya	✔	✔	5,199 m (17,057 ft)	3,825 m (12,549 ft)	Africa	–	Kenya	0.1°S 37.2°E
Mount Tyree	✔	✔	4,852 m (15,919 ft)	1,152 m (3,780 ft)	Antarctica	Sentinel	–	78.4117°S 85.8619°W
Sumantri		✔	4,870 m (15,978 ft)	2,760 m (9,055 ft)	Australia (continent)	Jayawijaya	Indonesia	4.7086°S 140.2892°E
Mount Townsend	✔		2,209 m (7,247 ft)	189 m (620 ft)	Australia	Snowies	Australia	36.42°S 148.27°E

== Climbing history ==
Austrian mountaineer Christian Stangl became the first person to successfully climb the Seven Second Summits. Stangl climbed all possible candidates for the Seven Second Summits quest (K2, Mount Logan, Ojos del Salado, Batian, Mount Tyree, Dych Tau, Dufourspitze, Sumantri, Ngga Pulu, Puncak Trikora, Puncak Mandala and Mount Townsend) to exclude any errors and to satisfy all geographers. He finished the quest on 15 January 2013 and was certified by Guinness World Records on 17 September 2013. Later, he also completed the Challenge for the Seven Third Summits.

In 2019, Takayasu Semba from Japan became the second person to complete the Seven Second Summits.

In 2024, Jenn Drummond became the first woman to complete the Seven Second Summits with her ascent of Sumantri on October 9, 2024. In total, she summited nine peaks (Ojos del Salado, Batian, Dych Tau, Mount Tyree, K2, Mount Townsend, Mount Logan, Monte Rosa, and Sumantri) to successfully complete the challenge. She is the first American woman and only the second woman overall to climb Mount Tyree and the third American woman to summit K2.

In 2012 the Italian mountaineer Hans Kammerlander claimed to be the first person to complete the Seven Second Summits, but doubts were raised about his ascent of Mount Logan. A second fraudulent summit claim on Mount Puncak Trikora confirms that Italian Hans Kammerlander never completed the Second Seven Summits series. Further, a third fraudulent summit claim of Hans Kammerlander was uncovered 2024 by a russian drone video.The video footage shows in detail where Kammerlander and his partner Flory Kern filmed their fake "summit" video. Far below the true summit of Dykhtau.

== Comparison with Seven Summits ==
The presentation of the Second Seven Summits concept and its relative difficulty was first published in January 1997 by Rock and Ice Magazine (#77) in the article The Second Seven Summits written by mountaineer and writer David D. Keaton. Later that year, the author Jon Krakauer in his book Into Thin Air echoed those sentiments by writing that it would be a bigger challenge to climb the second-highest peak of each continent instead of the highest. In the climbing community, mountaineers such as Rob Hall had previously discussed the idea.

In Asia, K2 (8,611 m (28,251 ft)) demands greater technical climbing skills than Everest (8,848 m (29,029 ft)), while altitude-related factors such as the thinness of the atmosphere, high winds, and low temperatures remain much the same.

In Africa, the summit of Mount Kenya (5,199 m (17,057 ft)) is a rock climb, while Mount Kilimanjaro (5,895 m (19,341 ft)) can be ascended without any technical difficulty.

In North America, some sources consider Mount Logan a more difficult climb than Denali, although the climbing and outdoor recreation website Summitpost considers Logan no more difficult than Denali because it is neither technical nor steep. Climber Mark Horrell, in a 2012 post on his blog, considered Mount Logan to be no more difficult technically than Denali, but much more difficult to approach. Denali's base camp, at 2,200 m (7,200 ft) elevation, is regularly served by air, while climbers without the means to charter a plane must tow their supplies by sledge for over 100 km (62 mi) to reach Mount Logan.

In South America, Ojos del Salado (6,893 m (22,615 ft)) involves a short scramble to its parent peak and more known as the second largest peak in the world, Aconcagua (6,967 m (22,858 ft)). Horrell acknowledged that Ojos del Salado was more technically difficult, but considered Aconcagua a greater challenge because of physical demands. Aconcagua's base camp, at 4,500 m (14,800 ft), is accessible by mule, but from that point on, climbers must carry all of their supplies to as many as three higher camps before the final ascent. By contrast, Ojos del Salado is accessible by four-wheel-drive vehicles up to 5,200 m (17,100 ft); from that point on, climbers carry supplies to a mountain hut at 5,800 m (19,000 ft) before making their final push to the summit.

In Europe, Dykh-Tau is a considerably harder climb than Mount Elbrus. According to Horrell, the main route on Elbrus is "long and physically tiring, but it’s not technically difficult," while Dykh-Tau's "easiest is graded at Russian alpine 4B, which involves steep rock sections and 55 degree snow and ice slopes."

In Australasia, the continent's Second Summit on the Bass list, Mount Townsend, is more challenging than Mount Kosciuszko, but still just a walk-up. The normal route on the highest peak of the Messner list, Puncak Jaya, is technically difficult (UIAA grade V+). Of the various candidates for the second summit; Puncak Mandala is extremely challenging with respect to the approach route, which is arguably the more significant problem in climbing the New Guinea peaks. There have been perhaps only two successful approaches (and climbs) reported.

In Antarctica, Mount Vinson presents little difficulty beyond normal challenges of Antarctica (the guiding company Adventure Peaks rates the ascent at PD/AD on the Alpine scale), but Mount Tyree requires technical climbing, and it has been climbed by a total of nineteen people since its discovery.

== See also ==
- Seven Summits
- Seven Third Summits
- Volcanic Seven Summits
- Three Poles Challenge
- Explorers Grand Slam, also known as The Adventurers Grand Slam
- Eight-thousander
