= Lists of mountains =

Mountains are listed according to various criteria:

- List of mountains by elevation
  - List of highest mountains greater than 7,200 metres (23,622 ft) above sea level
  - List of past presumed highest mountains
  - List of highest unclimbed peaks
  - List of volcanoes by elevation
- Topographic prominence
  - List of mountain peaks by prominence
  - Ultra-prominent peak
- Summits farthest from the Earth's center
- Lists of highest points restricted to a specific geographic area
  - List of countries by highest point
  - List of islands by highest point
- Lists of mountains by region sorted by country or province
  - Seven Summits, the highest peak on each continent
  - Seven Second Summits, the second-highest peak on each continent
  - Seven Third Summits, the third-highest peak on each continent
- List of tallest mountains in the Solar System
  - List of mountains on Mars by height
- List of mountain types sorted by geological origin
- List of mountain ranges organized into mountain ranges

== See also ==
- List of mountain lists, including lists for peakbaggers
