= Sumantri =

Mountain in the western Sudirman Range (New Guinea)

Sumantri Peak
- Puncak Sumantri
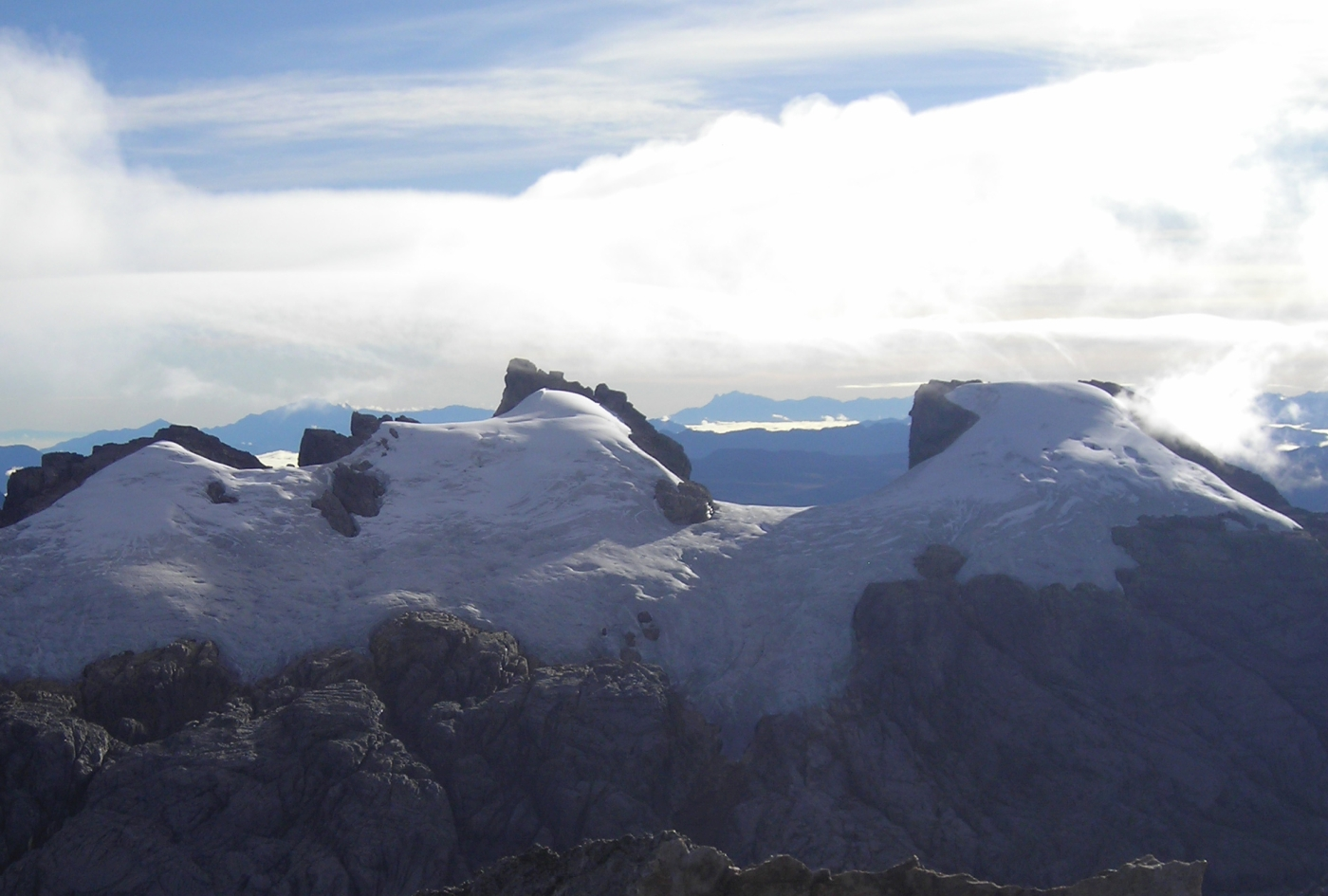
- The Northwall Firn glacier with Sumantri (sharp peak, center) and Ngga Pulu (flat peak, right).

Highest point
- Elevation: 4,870 m (15,980 ft)
- Prominence: 350 m (1,150 ft)
- Coordinates: 4°03′43″S 137°11′06″E

Geography
- Location within Central Papua Location within Western New Guinea Location within Indonesia
- Location: Central Papua, Indonesia
- Region: Western New Guinea
- Parent range: Sudirman Range

Climbing
- First ascent: February 1962
- Easiest route: rock/snow/ice climb

Sumantri Peak (also spelled Soemantri or Soemantri Brodjonegoro) is a sharp mountain in the western Sudirman Range (Central Papua). It rises 4,870 metres (15,978 ft).

The peak is approximately 2 km northeast of Carstensz Pyramid (4,884 m), the highest mountain of Oceania. The north side of Sumantri is dominated by tremendous cliffs, part of the Noordwand (Northwall) of the Carstensz Massif, that wrap around to the eastern and western sides of the mountain. Remnants of the once mighty Northwall Firn (now separated into eastern and western parts) cling tenuously to the southern aspects of the peak. It is unlikely that this ice will last for more than the next 15 years.

== Name ==
Before 1973 the summit was known as the NW summit of Ngga Pulu. The 1936 Carstensz Expedition called it the "Second Peak of the North Wall". Heinrich Harrer labeled it Ngapalu on his map drawn in 1962, while calling the SE peak of Ngga Pulu "Sunday Peak". Describing his ascent of both peaks in 1972, Dick Isherwood followed this nomenclature, using Ngga Poloe for what is now Sumantri and Sunday Peak for what is now known as Ngga Pulu.

The Indonesian government renamed the NW summit after professor Sumantri Brodjonegoro, Minister of Energy and Mineral Resources of the Republic of Indonesia, after he had died in office in 1973 at the age of 47.

== Climbing history ==
The neighboring and, at the time, higher SE summit of Ngga Pulu was first climbed by a Dutch expedition in 1936 (Anton Colijn, Jean Jacques Dozy and Frits Wissel). The NW summit was first climbed in February 1962 by Heinrich Harrer, Philip Temple, Russel Kippax and Bert Huizenga after their first ascent of Carstensz Pyramid.

The 600 m high north cliff was first climbed by Reinhold Messner in a solo effort on 27 September 1971, after he had second-ascended the Carstensz Pyramid with his client Sergio Bigarella earlier in the week. A year later Leo Murray, Jack Baines, and Dick Isherwood climbed both peaks of Ngga Pulu and found the peg that Meisner had left behind on top of the North Face of what they called Ngga Poloe (now Sumantri).

== Geology and glaciers ==
The mountains of Central Papua are being formed as the Australian and Pacific Plates collide, resulting in both subduction and uplifting. The rocks at the surface for the peaks in this range are made of limestone. As a result, even though the summit block of the peak looks extremely daunting, it is a fairly easy scramble.

Due to the melting of the Northwall Firn from the SE peak of Ngga Pulu, this summit is now the highest point of the north ridge of Mount Carstensz. Furthermore, due to the complete vanishing of the Meren Glacier, its topographic prominence has increased from what would have been ~200 m to ~350 m. Sumantri could be considered the second highest independent mountain of Oceania, and it features on some Seven Second Summits lists.
