= Firn =

Partially compacted névé

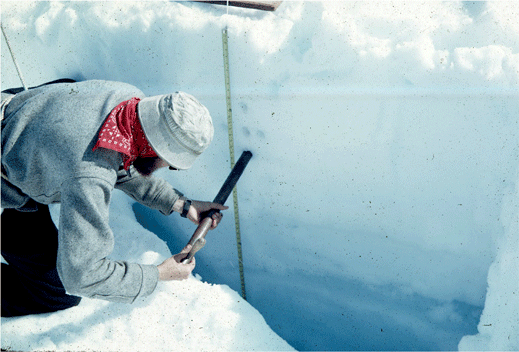
Sampling the surface of a glacier. There is increasingly dense firn between surface snow and blue glacier ice.

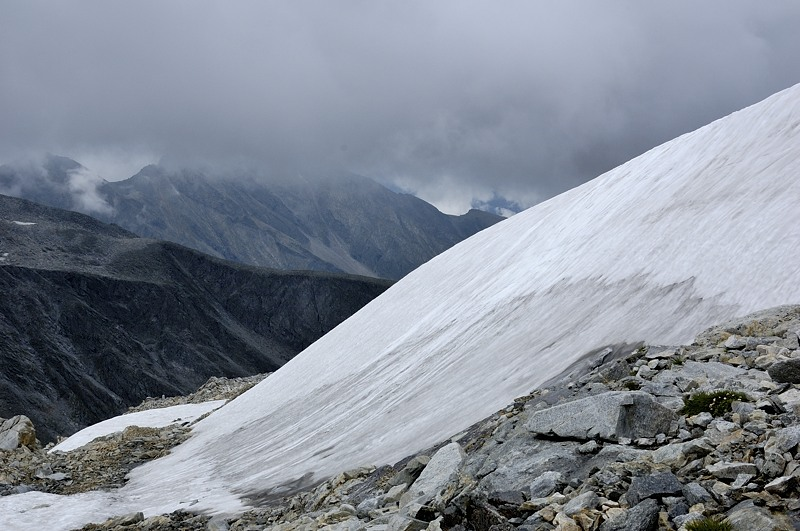
Firn field on the top of Säuleck, Hohe Tauern, in the Central Alps

Firn (/ˈfɪərn/; from Swiss German firn "last year's", cognate with before) is partially compacted névé, a type of snow that has been left over from past seasons and has been recrystallized into a substance denser than névé. It is ice that is at an intermediate stage between snow and glacial ice. Firn has the appearance of wet sugar, but has a hardness that makes it extremely resistant to shovelling. Its density generally ranges from 0.35 g/cm^{3} to 0.9 g/cm^{3}, and it can often be found underneath the snow that accumulates at the head of a glacier.

Snowflakes are compressed under the weight of the overlying snowpack. Individual crystals near the melting point are semiliquid and slick, allowing them to glide along other crystal planes and fill in the spaces between them, increasing the ice's density. Where the crystals touch, they bond together, squeezing the air between them to the surface or into bubbles.

In the summer months, the crystal metamorphosis can occur more rapidly because of water percolation between the crystals. By summer's end, the result is firn.

The minimum altitude that firn accumulates on a glacier is called the firn limit, firn line or snowline.

== List of firns ==
- Antarctic Firn
- Daniel Bruun Firn
- Dreyer Firn
- East Northwall Firn
- Rink Firn
- Sven Hedin Firn
- West Northwall Firn

== Other uses ==
In colloquial and technical language, "firn" is used to describe certain forms of old snow, including:

- old snowfields, known as Firnfelder (lit. 'firn fields'), even if the snow is not yet one year old
- the more recent snow layers of a temperate, or "firned", glacier
- used in skiing, the uppermost, soft layer of snow that is frozen overnight and, as a result of spring sunshine and high air temperatures, melts and reforms on an area of old snow or harsch (lit. 'harsh', referring to the snow's rough texture)

As in the last context, a ski slope that experiences melting and refreezing into harsch is said to "firn up". In Switzerland, these slopes are called Sulz, but in Germany, Sulz more often refers to a depth at which skiing downhill is no longer enjoyable.

== Sources ==
- "Firn". Encyclopædia Britannica.
- "Fundamentals of Physical Geography". physicalgeography.net.
- Machguth, Horst; MacFerrin, Mike; van As, Dirk; Box, Jason E.; Charalampidis, Charalampos; Colgan, William; Fausto, Robert S.; Meijer, Harro A. J.; Mosley-Thompson, Ellen; van de Wal, Roderik S. W. (April 2016). "Greenland meltwater storage in firn limited by near-surface ice formation" (PDF). Nature Climate Change. 6 (4): 390–393. Bibcode:2016NatCC...6..390M. doi:10.1038/nclimate2899. hdl:1874/335472. S2CID 33914856.
- "USGS Glossary of Selected Glacier and Related Terminology". ulcan.wr.usgs.gov. Archived from the original on 2014-02-03.
