= Indonesia Women Seven Summits Expedition =

The Indonesia Women Seven Summits Expedition was a team of Indonesian women with a stated objective to scale all Seven Summits (the "Messner version") within two years, starting on August 17, 2014 (Indonesian Independence Day). The team's mission was to promote sexual equality, following the eponymic Indonesia Seven Summits Expedition, which would not admit female mountaineers. On May 17, 2018, the two most senior female members scaled Mount Everest, the final summit of the expedition.

== Mission ==
At the time of the formation of the Indonesia Women Seven Summits Expedition, only 33 of 348 mountaineers who had completed the Seven Summits mountaineering challenge were women, among which none were Indonesian. The mission of the expedition was to express to the world that Indonesian women are no less capable than their male counterparts.

== 2014-2016 women team member expedition ==
All the members of the women team were students of Parahyangan Catholic University:

- Fransiska Dimitri Inkiriwang (completed all summits)
- Mathilda Dwi Lestari (completed all summits)
- Dian Indah Carolina (up to Aconcagua)
- Zulfika Sari DW (completed Carstensz Pyramid)

== Order of Summits ==
The team's plan was to scale the mountains in the order of:

- Carstensz Pyramid, Indonesia, Oceania
- Elbrus, Russia, Europe
- Kilimanjaro, Tanzania, Africa
- Aconcagua, Argentina, South America
- Vinson Massif, Antarctica
- Denali, Alaska, North America
- Mount Everest, Nepal, Asia

== Carstensz Pyramid ==
Also known as Puncak Jaya, the Carstensz Pyramid is located in the team's home base country of Indonesia, and several Indonesian climbers had scaled it previously. With eight other climbers, the team successfully reached the Carstensz Pyramid (4,884 meters above sea level) on August 17, 2014. There, the team notably replaced and fixed the climbing rope on the mountain.

== Elbrus ==
The team scaled Mount Elbrus on May 15, 2015.

== Kilimanjaro ==
Five days after scaling Mount Elbrus, on May 20, 2015, the team began to climb Mount Kilimanjaro via the Machame Gate. Four days later, on May 24, 2015, the team reached the summit of Mount Kilimanjaro.

== Aconcagua ==
The team scaled Mount Aconcagua on January 31, 2016.

== Vinson Massif ==
The team scaled the Vinson Massif on January 4, 2017.

== Denali ==
The team reached the summit of Denali on July 1, 2017 (local time, AKTZ), after 13 days of climbing. Members Fransiska and Mathilda were the 34th and 35th women to have scaled Denali, respectively.

== Everest ==
The two most senior members of the Indonesia Women Seven Summits Expedition reached an altitude of 7,020 meters on Mount Everest on May 1, 2018. However, they subsequently had to descend to the Advanced Base Camp (ABC) at 6,400 meters to maximize the acclimation process. After several days, on May 17, 2018, the pair departed from Camp 3, (8,271 meters above mean sea level), and reached the summit on the same day. At 05:50 am (local time, GMT+8) that day, a year and 11 months after the stated deadline, an Indonesian flag was planted atop Mount Everest.

== Notes ==
- Fransiska Dimitri Inkiriwang and Mathilda Dwi Lestari are, respectively, the first and second (by a matter of seconds) Southeast Asian women to scale the Seven Summits.
- Achieved in 3 years and 11 months, the team missed their goal of 2 years, to beat the Indonesia Seven Summits Expedition male team.
