= Indonesia Seven Summits Expedition =

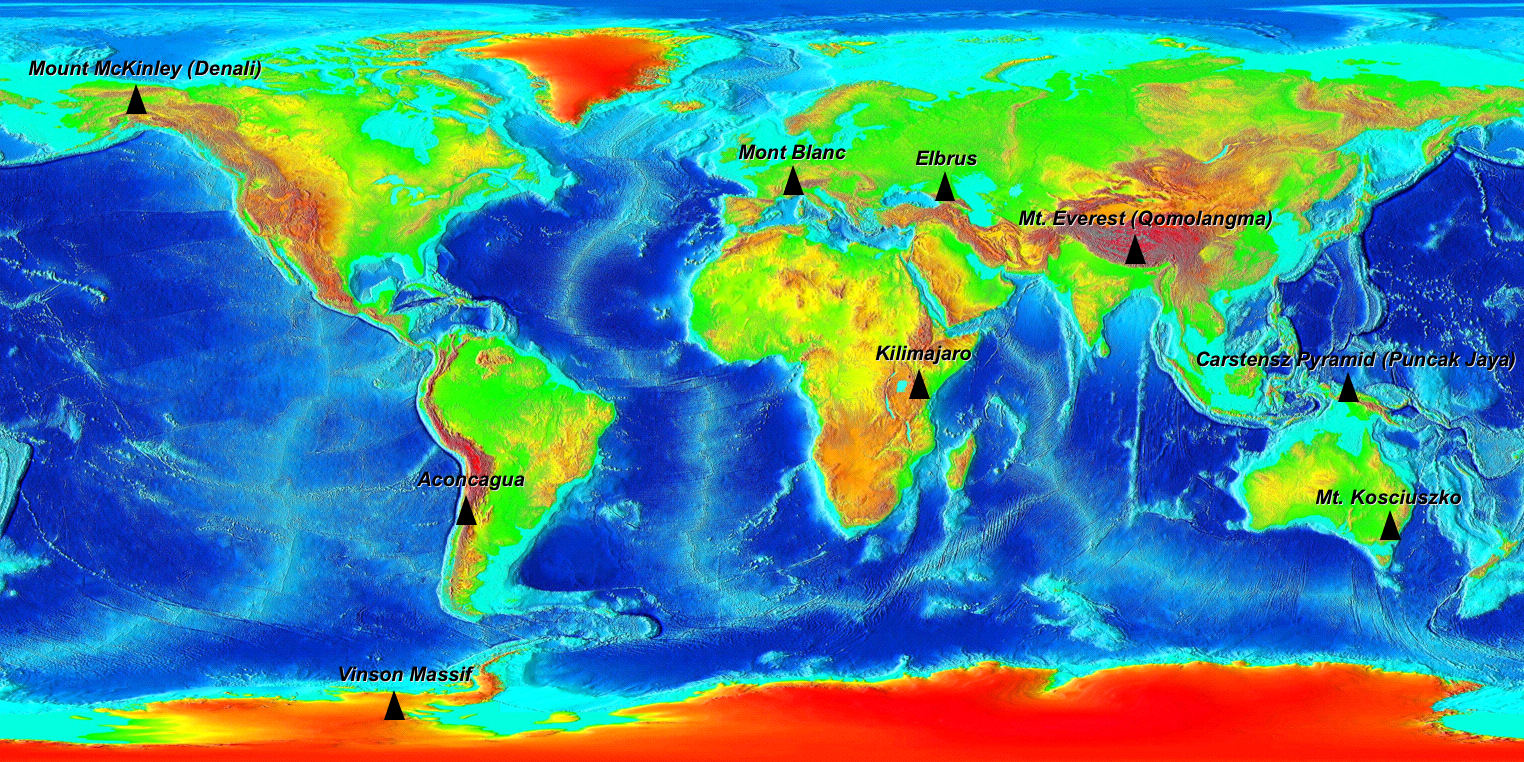
Map of the Seven Summits

The Indonesian Seven Summits Expedition Mahitala Unpar (ISSEMU) was a team of four mountaineers from Indonesia that successfully climbed the Seven Summits (the Messner version) between 2009 and 2011. The last peak of their expedition was Denali in Alaska, which they reached on July 7, 2011. This marked the first time a team from Indonesia had completed the challenge.

The following year, another Indonesian team attempted to complete it; several members of that team finally succeeded in May 2013. As of 2020, ten Indonesian individuals have completed the challenge, after two women scaled Mount Everest in 2018.

== Past attempts ==
In March 1992, an Indonesian expedition attempted to climb the Seven Summits. The expedition was led by Mapala UI, but failed after two team members, Norman Edwin and Didiek Samsu Wahyu Triachdi, died. In 1993, Tantyo Bangun and Rinto Mulyono attempted but did not complete the challenge after failing to ascend the Vinson Massif.

== Team members (2009–2011) ==
The core team consisted of Sofyan Arief Fesa, Broery Andrew Sihombing, Xaverius Frans, and Janatan Ginting.

== The Seven Summits ==
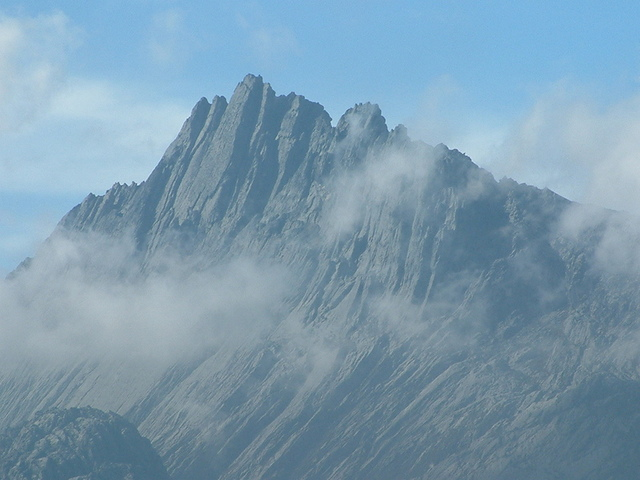
Puncak Jaya or the Carstensz Pyramid

In the expedition's home country of Indonesia, the core team successfully reached the summit of the Carstensz Pyramid (4,884 m above sea level) on February 26, 2009. They summited Mount Kilimanjaro, Tanzania, Africa (5,895 m) via Machame on August 10, 2010, and two weeks later reached the peak of Mount Elbrus, Russia, Europe (5,642 m), climbing the northwest route without a guide. Although the south side of the mountain is occupied by a ski resort, the north side has no facilities at all and the climbers faced a difficult ice climb.

The core team summited the Vinson Massif, Antarctica (4,892 m) on December 13, 2010, becoming the first Indonesians to ever reach the peak. Health issues affecting two of the team members meant that Aconcagua, Argentina, South America (6,961 m) was climbed in two different expeditions. The first group succeeded in reaching the peak on January 9, 2011, the rest of the team following three weeks later. At 5:22 local time on May 20, 2011, Broery Andrew Sihombing was the first of the team to summit Mount Everest, Nepal, Asia (8,848 m), followed shortly by the others, marking the completion of the sixth summit.

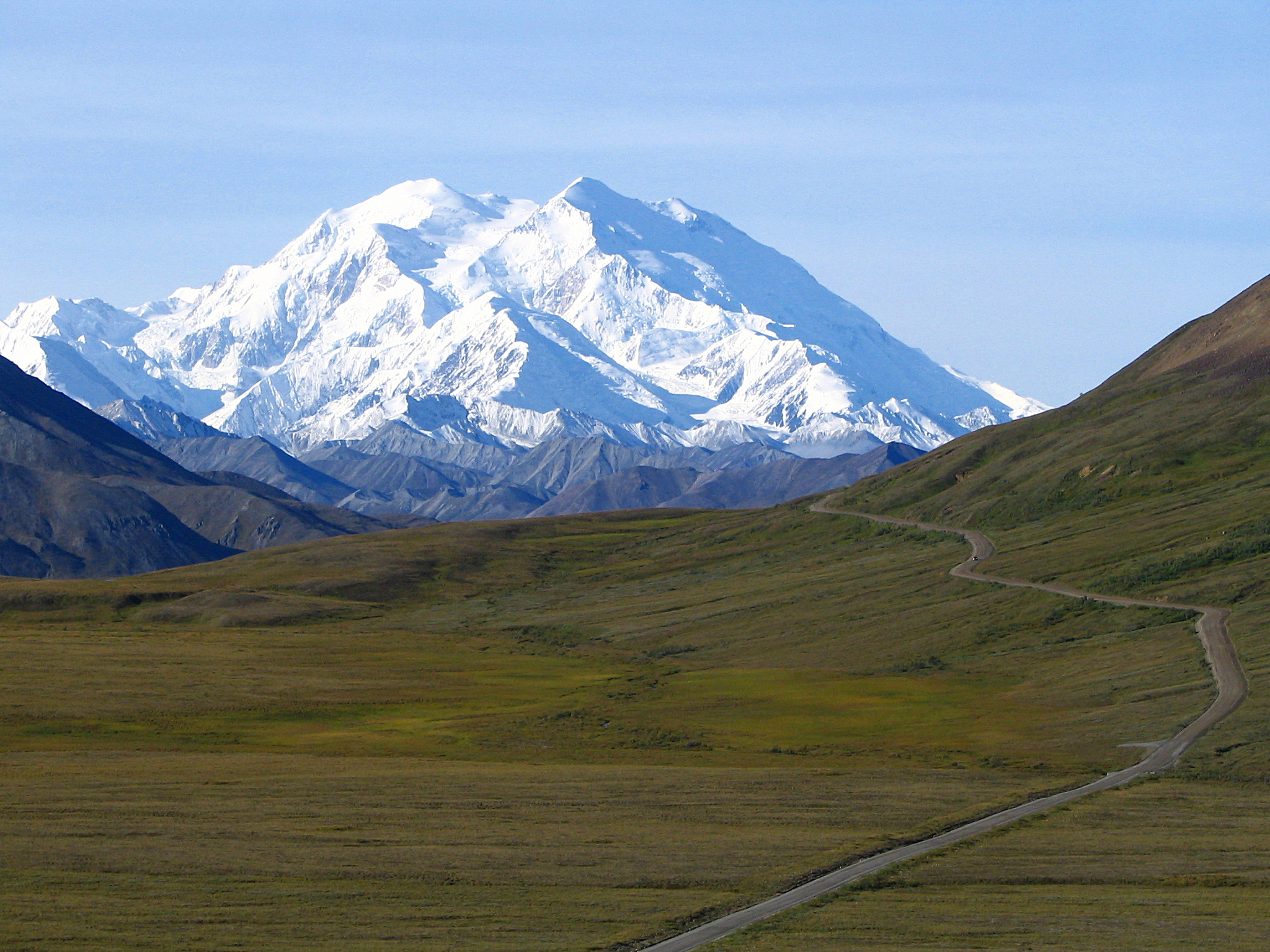
Denali

Considered an extremely difficult climb due to the severe weather and steep vertical climbs, Denali, Alaska, North America (6,190 m) was the final peak of the expedition. Three years prior, Denali had claimed the life of an Indonesian Scout Team member. On July 7, 2011, at 19:35 local time the team successfully reached the peak of Denali, marking the completion of all Seven Summits by the team. The ISSEMU team were the first Indonesians to complete the challenge. They joined the 275 people who had climbed all Seven Summits, making Indonesia the 53rd country to have citizens successfully summit all seven peaks.

== Records ==
- The first university students to successfully climb all seven mountains on the first attempt.
- The youngest southeast Asians to climb the Seven Summits, aged between 22 and 28 years with an average age of 24 years.
- The first Indonesian mountaineers to complete the Seven Summits challenge.

== Second team ==
A second Indonesian team consisted of five male climbers and one female climber. The expedition costs of an estimated Rp.10 billion ($1.2 million) were partially covered by the team's sponsors, including the Ministry of Youth Affairs and Sports and the Indonesian ANTARA news agency.

After successfully ascending the Cartensz Pyramid (on April 22, 2010, coinciding with Earth Day), Mount Kilimanjaro, Mount Elbrus, and Aconcagua, only four of the male climbers successfully summited Denali on May 15, 2011: Iwan Irawan, Martin Rimbawan, Fadjri al Lufhfi, and Nurhuda. Next on the agenda were the Vinson Massif and Mount Everest, with plans to conclude the expedition in May 2012. On December 23, 2011 the team travelled from Jakarta to Punta Arenas, Chile and from there to the Vinson Massif base camp. Two weeks later, the team successfully reached the summit. Later in 2012, Rimbawan had a medical problem and was replaced by Ardhesir Yafftebbi.

In early April 2012, the team started climbing Mount Everest in two groups, with the first group ascending from the south (Nepal) and the second from the north (Tibet). The team taking the north route (Irawan and Nurhuda) reached the top of Mount Everest on May 19, 2012. The team starting from the south ended the expedition without reaching the summit of Mount Everest after Yafftebbi got laryngitis and al Lufhfi could not continue in winds of 50 meters/second (180 kilometers/hour). After a year long rest, al Lufhti and Rimbawan successfully reached the summit of Mount Everest on May 23, 2013.

== See also ==
- Indonesia Women Seven Summits Expedition
