= Carstensz Glacier =

Glacier in Indonesia

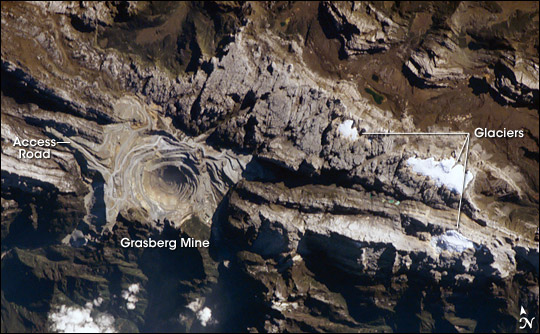
- The Carstensz Glacier is at lower right in this 2005 image. The circular depression to the left is the Grasberg mine, the world's largest gold mine.

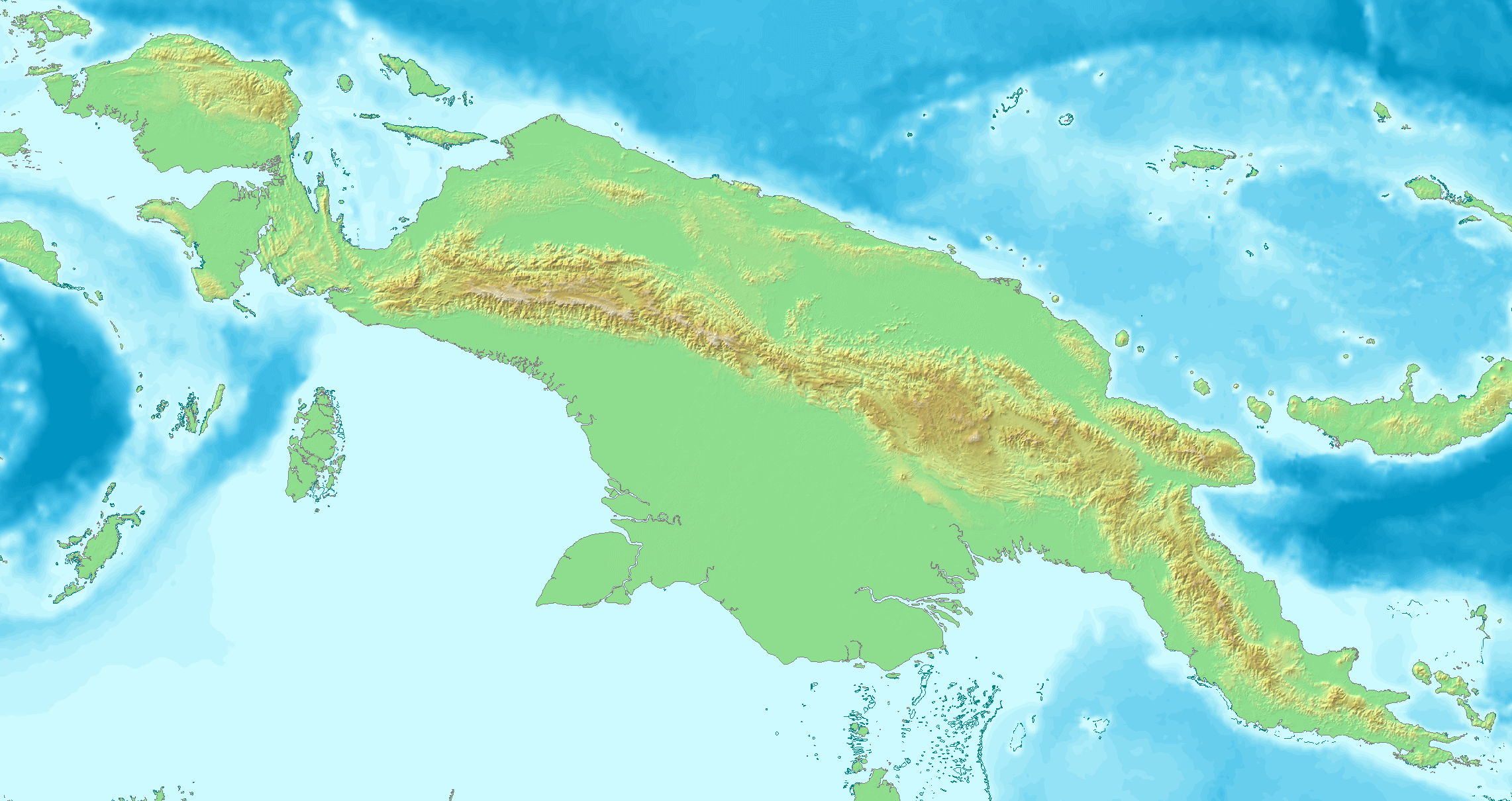
- Location within New Guinea Location within Indonesia
- Type: Mountain glacier
- Location: Puncak Jaya, Sudirman Range, Central Papua, Indonesia
- Coordinates: 04°04′59.32″S 137°10′44.77″E
- Area: 0.04 km^{2} (0.015 sq mi) in November 2025
- Length: 440 m (1,440 ft)
- Terminus: Rockfall
- Status: Retreating

The Carstensz Glacier is found near the a sub-peak of Puncak Jaya (sometimes called Mount Carstensz or the Carstensz Pyramid), Carstensz East. Puncak Jaya is a mountain in the Sudirman Range of the island of New Guinea, territorially the eastern highlands of Central Papua, Indonesia. The glacier is situated at an elevation of approximately 4,660 metres (15,290 ft) and is 1.5 kilometres (0.93 mi) east of the summit tower of Puncak Jaya. In 2002 the Carstensz Glacier was 1.4 kilometres (0.87 mi) in length and .60 kilometres (0.37 mi) wide. In November 2025 it was only 440 metres (1,440 ft) length and 100 metres (330 ft) wide.

Date	Area	Length
November 2023	0.05 square kilometres (0.019 sq mi)	470 metres (1,540 ft)
November 2025	0.04 square kilometres (0.015 sq mi)	440 metres (1,440 ft)

source : Satellite observations on Copernicus Browser

The glacier is named after the 17th century Dutch explorer Jan Carstenszoon, commonly known as Jan Carstensz.

== Background ==
Research presented in 2004 of IKONOS satellite imagery of the New Guinean glaciers indicated that in the two years from 2000 to 2002, the Carstensz Glacier had lost a further 6.8% of its surface area. An expedition to the remaining glaciers on Puncak Jaya in 2010 discovered that the ice on the glaciers there is about 32 metres (105 ft) thick and thinning at a rate of 7 metres (23 ft) annually. At that rate, the remaining glaciers in the immediate region near Puncak Jaya were expected to last only to the year 2015. A 2019 study predicted their disappearance within a decade. Estimates from 2024 predict the glacier will have disappeared by 2030.

The remaining remnant glaciers on Punkak Jaya were once part of an icecap that developed approximately 5,000 years ago. At least one previous icecap also existed in the region between 15,000 and 7,000 years ago, when it also apparently melted away and disappeared.

== Gallery ==
Animated map of the extent of the glaciers of the Carstens Range from 1850 to 2003

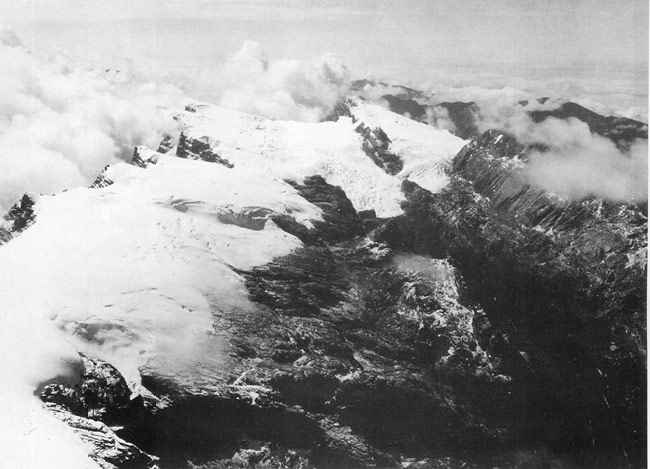
Puncak Jaya region icecap in 1936.

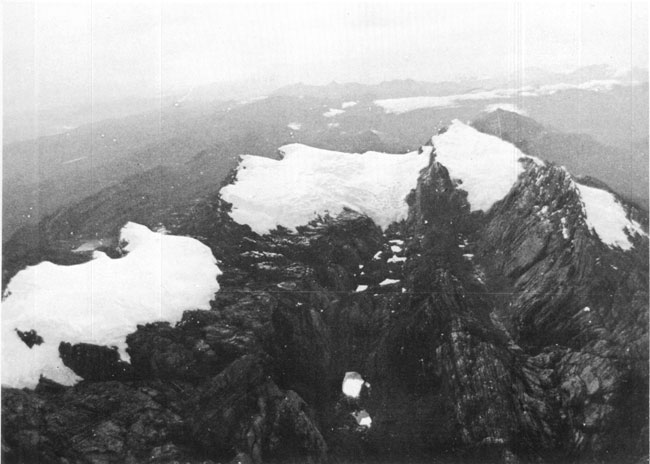
Puncak Jaya glaciers in 1972. Left to right: West Northwall Firn, East Northwall Firn, Meren Glacier (now disappeared), and Carstensz Glacier. See also animation.

== See also ==
- Retreat of glaciers since 1850
- List of glaciers
