= Puncak Jaya =

Highest mountain in Indonesia and Oceania

- Carstensz Pyramid / Nemangkawi Ninggok
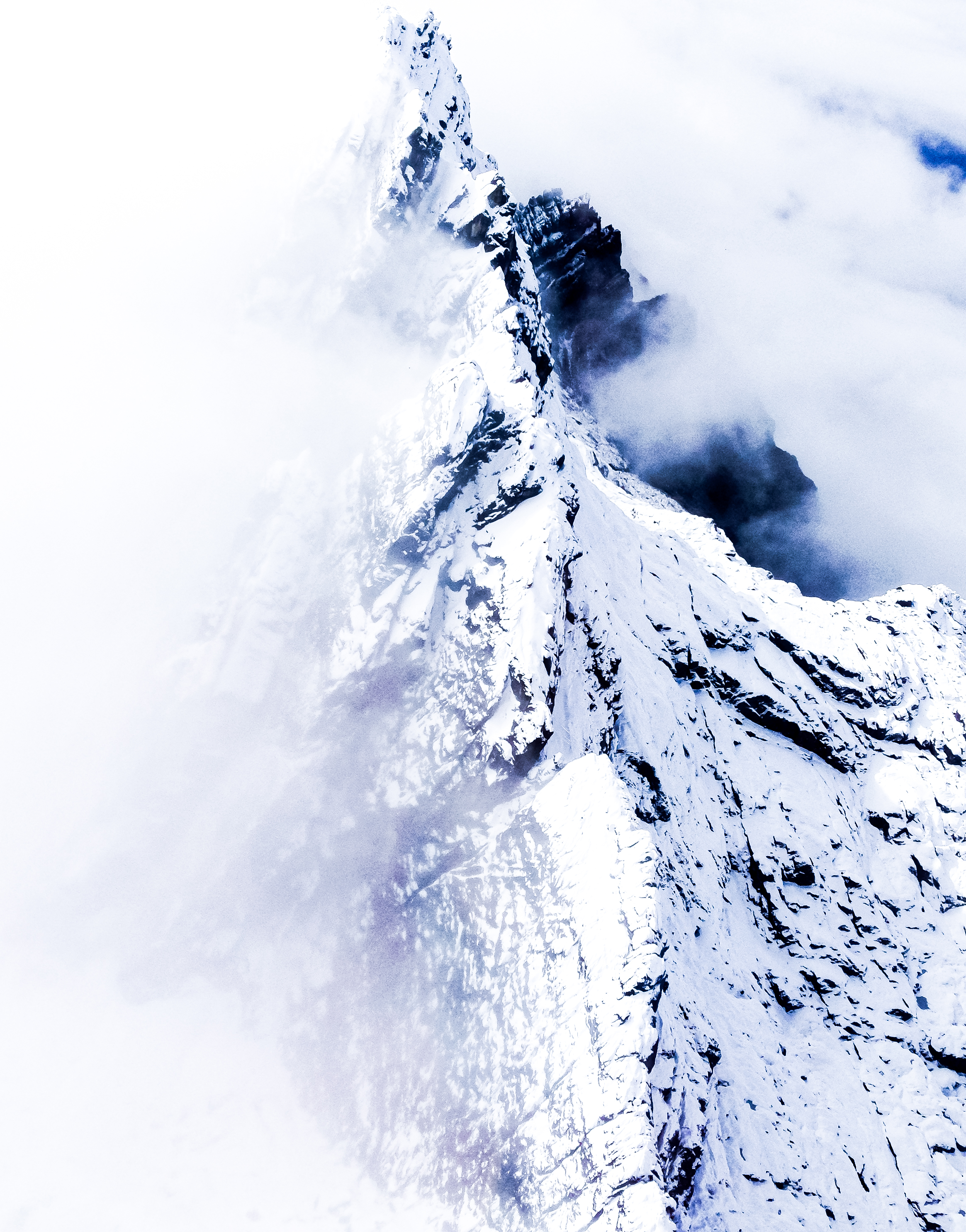
- Summit of Puncak Jaya seen from a Helicopter (c. 2020)

Highest point
- Elevation: 4,884 m (16,024 ft)
- Prominence: 4,884 m (16,024 ft); Ranked 9th
- Listing: Seven Summits; Eight Summits; Country highpoint Island high point Ultra; World's most isolated peaks 5th
- Coordinates: 04°04′44″S 137°9′30″E

Geography
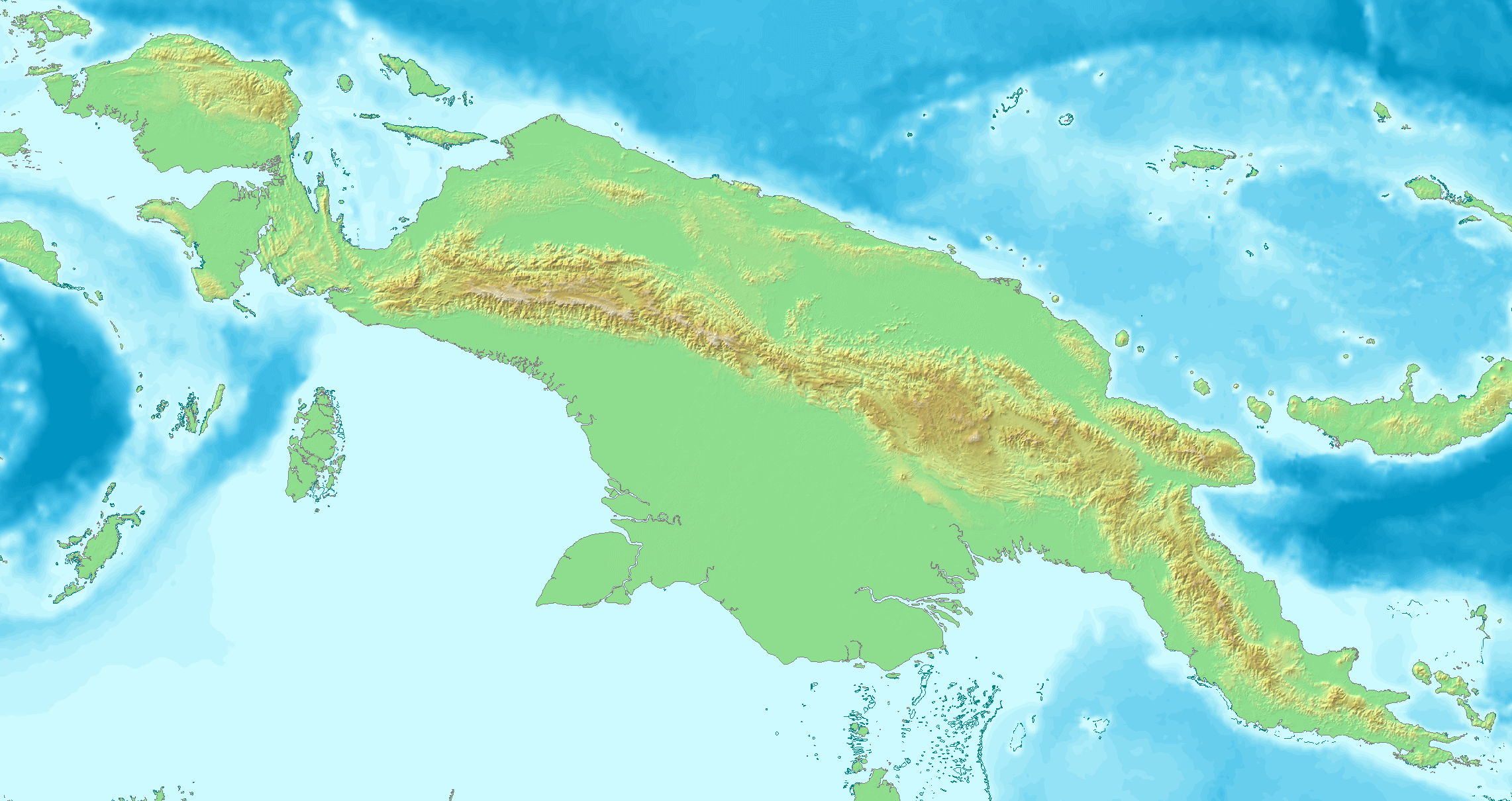
- Location within Central Papua Location within Western New Guinea Location within New Guinea Location within Indonesia
- Location: Central Papua, Indonesia
- Parent range: Sudirman Range

Climbing
- First ascent: 1936 by Colijn, Dozy, and Wissels; 1962 by Harrer, Temple, Kippax, and Huizenga
- Easiest route: rock/snow/ice climb

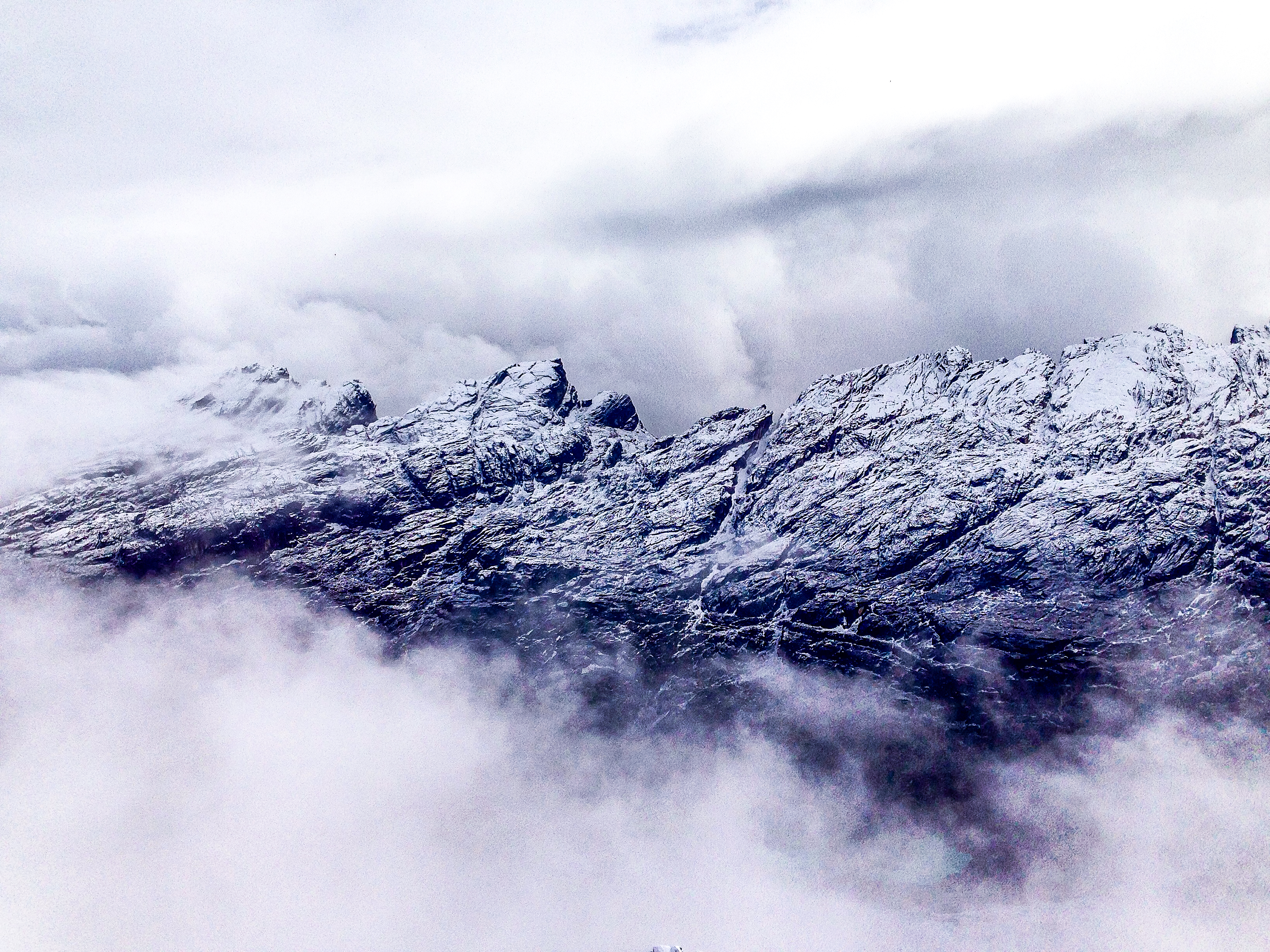
Puncak Jaya region icecap, Papua

Puncak Jaya (Indonesian: [ˈpuntʃak ˈdʒaja]; literally 'Victorious Peak', Damal: Nemangkawi Ninggok) or Carstensz Pyramid (/ˈkɑːrstəns/, Indonesian: Piramida Carstensz, Dutch: Carstenszpiramide) on the island of New Guinea, with an elevation of 4,884 m (16,024 ft), is the highest mountain peak of an island on Earth, and the highest peak in Indonesia and within Oceania. The mountain is located in the Sudirman Range of the highlands of Mimika Regency, Central Papua, Indonesia. Puncak Jaya is ranked 5th in the world by topographic isolation.

When regarding New Guinea as part of the Australian continent in a biogeographical sense, Puncak Jaya can be considered the highest peak in all of Oceania, with its elevation exceeding those of the highest peaks in the nearby nations of Papua New Guinea (Mount Wilhelm), New Zealand (Aoraki / Mount Cook) and Australia (Mount Kosciuszko). Puncak Jaya is therefore often listed as one of the Seven Summits. However, since Puncak Jaya is in Western New Guinea, an area administered by Indonesia and therefore geopolitically part of Southeast Asia, the peak can also be considered the 8th highest mountain in this region, after Hkakabo Razi and six others in Kachin State, Myanmar.

The massive, open cut Grasberg gold and copper mine, the world's second-largest gold mine, is four kilometres (2.5 mi) west of Puncak Jaya.

Other summits are East Carstensz Peak (4,808 m [15,774 ft]), Sumantri (4,870 m [15,980 ft]) and Ngga Pulu (4,863 m [15,955 ft]). Other names include Nemangkawi in the Amungkal language, Carstensz Toppen and Gunung Soekarno. It is also the highest point between the Himalayas and the Andes.

== Etymology ==
The name of the mountain in the indigenous Amungme peoples' language is Nemangkawi Ninggok meaning Peak of the White Arrow. The name Puncak Jaya is Indonesian for 'Glorious Peak'. It is also known as the Carstensz Pyramid, Mount Jayawijaya, or Mount Carstensz.

== History ==
The highlands surrounding the peak were inhabited before European contact, and the peak is known as Nemangkawi in Amungkal.

=== Dutch discovery ===
Puncak Jaya was named "Carstensz Pyramid" after Dutch explorer Jan Carstenszoon, who was the first European to sight the glaciers on the peak of the mountain on a rare clear day in 1623. The sighting went unverified for over two centuries, and Carstensz was ridiculed in Europe when he said he had seen snow near the equator. It appeared on maps of the time as Sneebergh.

The snowfield of Puncak Trikora, 170 km (106 mi) east of here, was reached as early as 1909 by a Dutch explorer, Hendrik Albert Lorentz, with six of his Dayak Kenyah porters recruited from the Apo Kayan in Borneo. The predecessor of the Lorentz National Park, which encompasses the Carstensz Range, was established in 1919 following the report of this expedition.

Animated map of the extent of the glaciers of the Carstensz Range from 1850 to 2003.

== Geology ==
Puncak Jaya is the highest point on the Central Range, which was created in the late Miocene Melanesian orogeny, that was caused by an oblique collision between the Australian and Pacific plates, and is made of middle Miocene limestones.

=== Glaciers ===
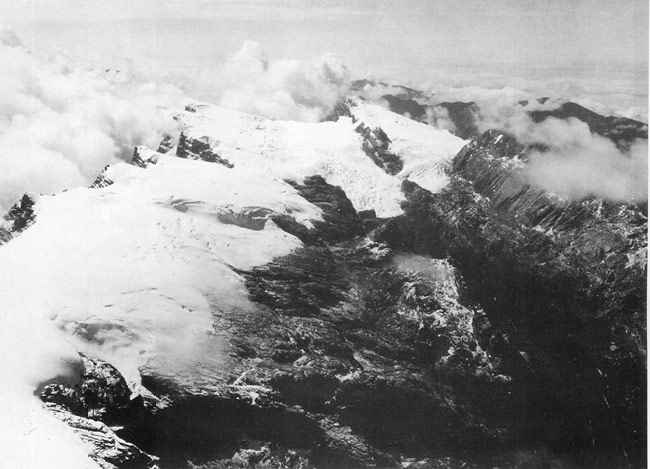
Puncak Jaya icecap 1936

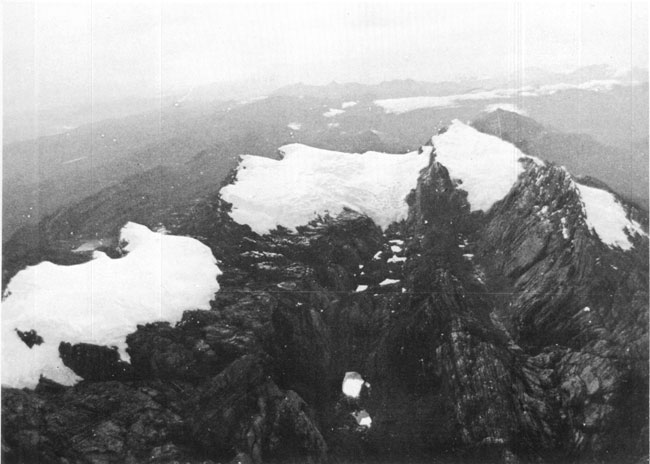
Puncak Jaya icecap 1972

While Puncak Jaya's peak is free of ice, there are several glaciers on its slopes, including the Carstensz Glacier, West Northwall Firn, East Northwall Firn and the recently vanished Meren Glacier in the Meren Valley (meren is Dutch for "lakes"). Being equatorial, there is little variation in the mean temperature during the year (around 0.5 °C [32.9 °F]) and the glaciers fluctuate on a seasonal basis only slightly. However, analysis of the extent of these rare equatorial glaciers from historical records show significant retreat since the 1850s, around the time of the Little Ice Age Maximum which primarily affected the Northern Hemisphere, indicating a regional warming to around 0.6 °C (33.1 °F) over more than a century between 1850 and 1972.

The glacier on Puncak Trikora in the Maoke Mountains disappeared completely some time between 1939 and 1962. Since the 1970s, evidence from satellite imagery indicates the Puncak Jaya glaciers have been retreating rapidly. The Meren Glacier melted away sometime between 1994 and 2000.

An expedition led by paleoclimatologist Lonnie Thompson in 2010 found that the glaciers are disappearing at a rate of seven metres (23 ft) thickness per year and in 2018 they were predicted to vanish in the 2020s. Further investigations revealed a continuous decline in glacier area, leaving a total glaciated area of 0.165 ± 0.008 km² in 2024. This indicates a loss of total glacier surface area of ~99% since ~1850. The glaciers are expected to disappear by the beginning of the 2030s.

== Climate ==
The peak has an ice cap climate (Köppen: EF, Trewartha: Fioo).

Climate data for Mount Puncak Jaya (4884 m)
Month	Jan	Feb	Mar	Apr	May	Jun	Jul	Aug	Sep	Oct	Nov	Dec	Year
Mean daily maximum °C (°F)	−0.1 (31.8)	0.0 (32.0)	0.1 (32.2)	0.1 (32.2)	0.3 (32.5)	−0.2 (31.6)	−0.3 (31.5)	−0.5 (31.1)	−0.4 (31.3)	−0.3 (31.5)	0.0 (32.0)	0.1 (32.2)	−0.1 (31.8)
Mean daily minimum °C (°F)	−0.5 (31.1)	−0.5 (31.1)	−0.5 (31.1)	−0.4 (31.3)	−0.4 (31.3)	−0.6 (30.9)	−0.8 (30.6)	−1.1 (30.0)	−1.0 (30.2)	−0.8 (30.6)	−0.5 (31.1)	−0.4 (31.3)	−0.6 (30.9)

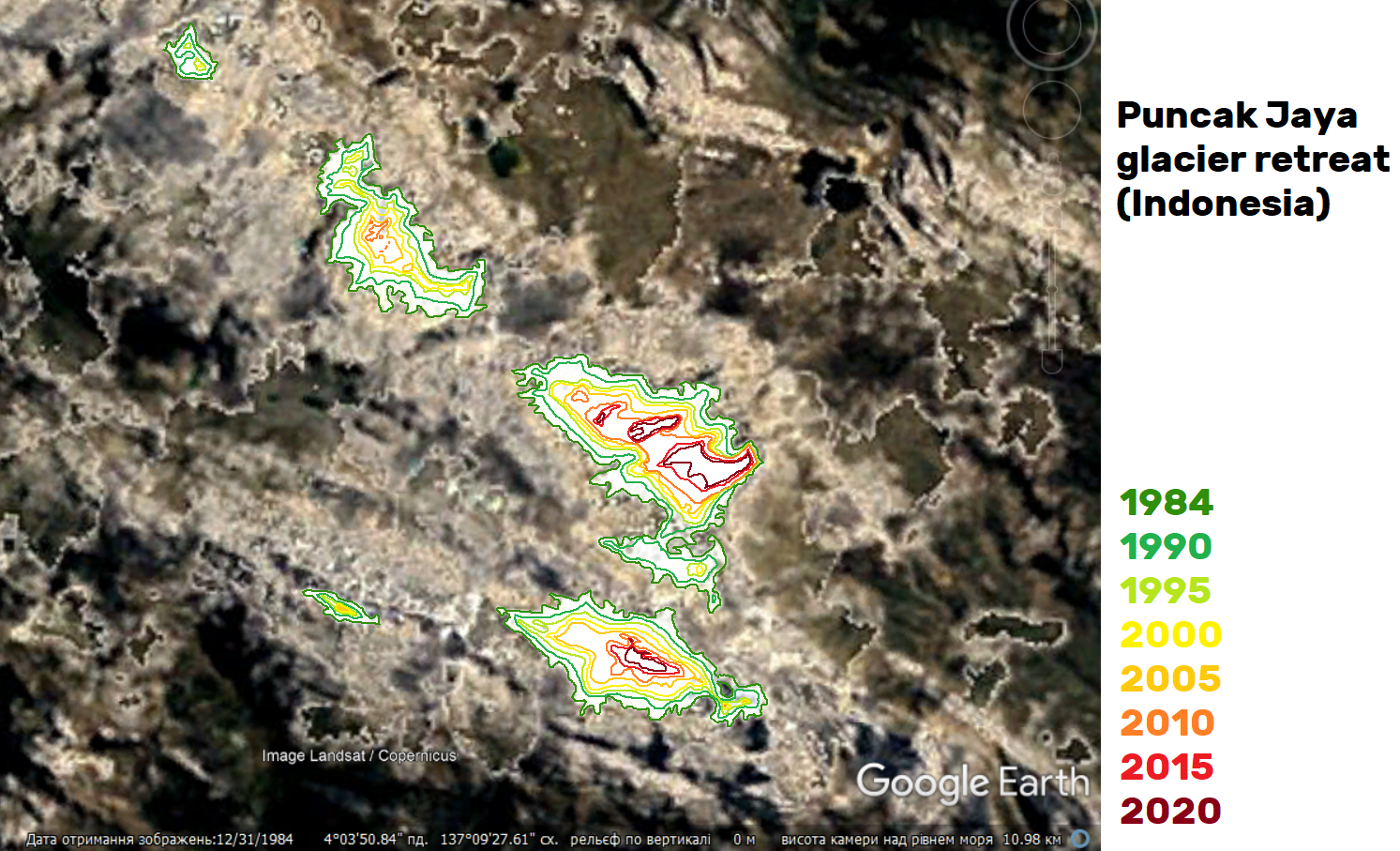
Disappearance of glaciers from Puncak Jaya, 1984–2020

== Climbing ==
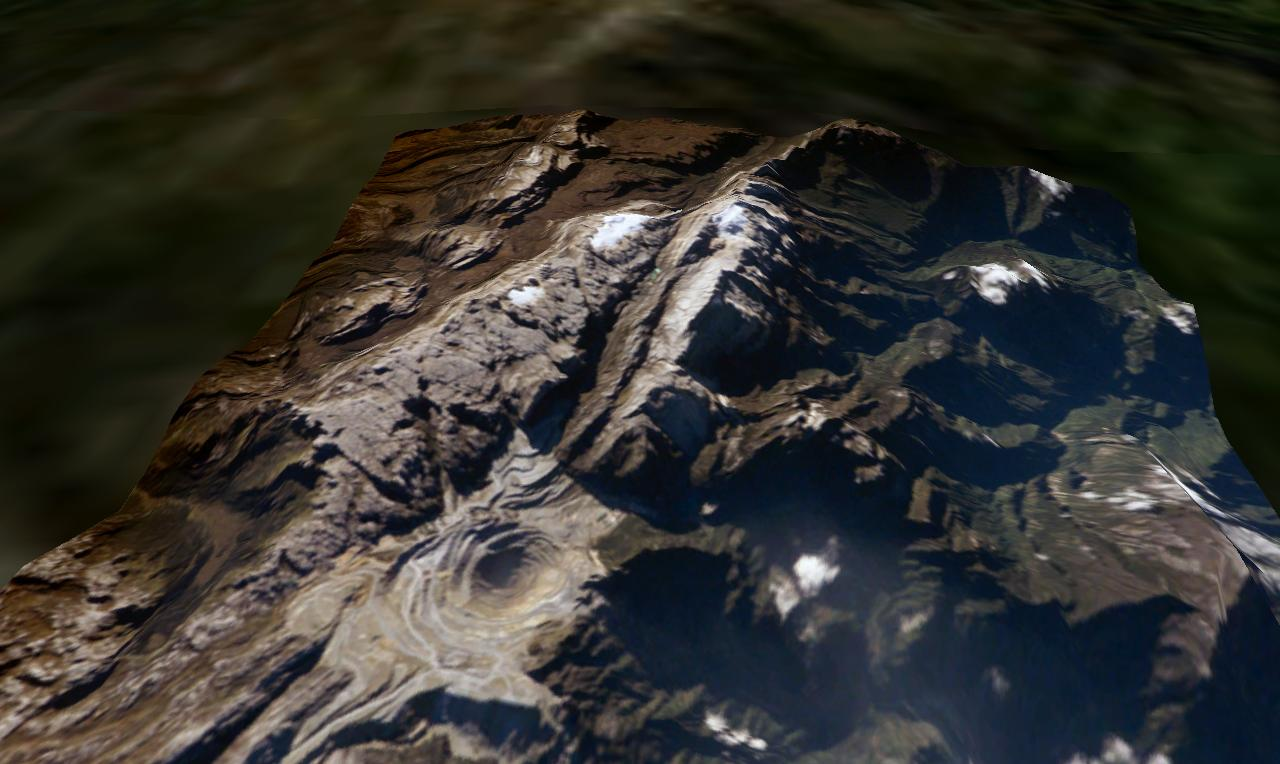
The highland area in 2005, with the Grasberg copper mine pit in the foreground. Its summit is at the far end of the central rib.

Puncak Jaya is one of the more demanding climbs in one version of the Seven Summits, despite having the lowest elevation. It is held to have the highest technical rating, though not the greatest physical demands of that list's ascents.

The standard route to climb the peak from its base camp is up the north face and along the summit ridge, which is all hard rock surface. Despite the large mine, the area is highly inaccessible to hikers and the general public. The standard route to access base camp as of 2013 is to fly into the nearest major town with an airport, Timika, and then take a small aircraft over the mountain range and onto an unimproved runway at one of the local villages far down from the peak. It is then typically a five-day hike via the Jungle route to the base camp through very dense rainforest and with regular rainfall, making the approach probably the "most miserable" of the Seven Summits. Rain during most days of the hike inbound and out are not uncommon. Unlike the other Seven Summits, if one sustains an injury on the inbound hike, there is little or no ability to get rescued via helicopter. Anyone injured must evacuate by foot over very difficult and slippery terrain.

The descent from the peak's base camp can take three to four days. Anecdotally, it appears most injuries occur during the descent due to a combination of exhaustion and difficulty controlling hiking speed on the wet and slippery terrain.

An additional complication is relatively common work strikes by the climbing porters that accompany most expeditions, occasionally halting their work to demand (and usually receive) higher pay before agreeing to continue. The one-day summit bid is technically challenging for those with little rock climbing experience, and it can be quite cold with temperatures at or below freezing near the summit. Patches of snow sometimes appear on the route up or on the ropes of the Tyrolean traverse just below the summit.

=== Climbing history ===
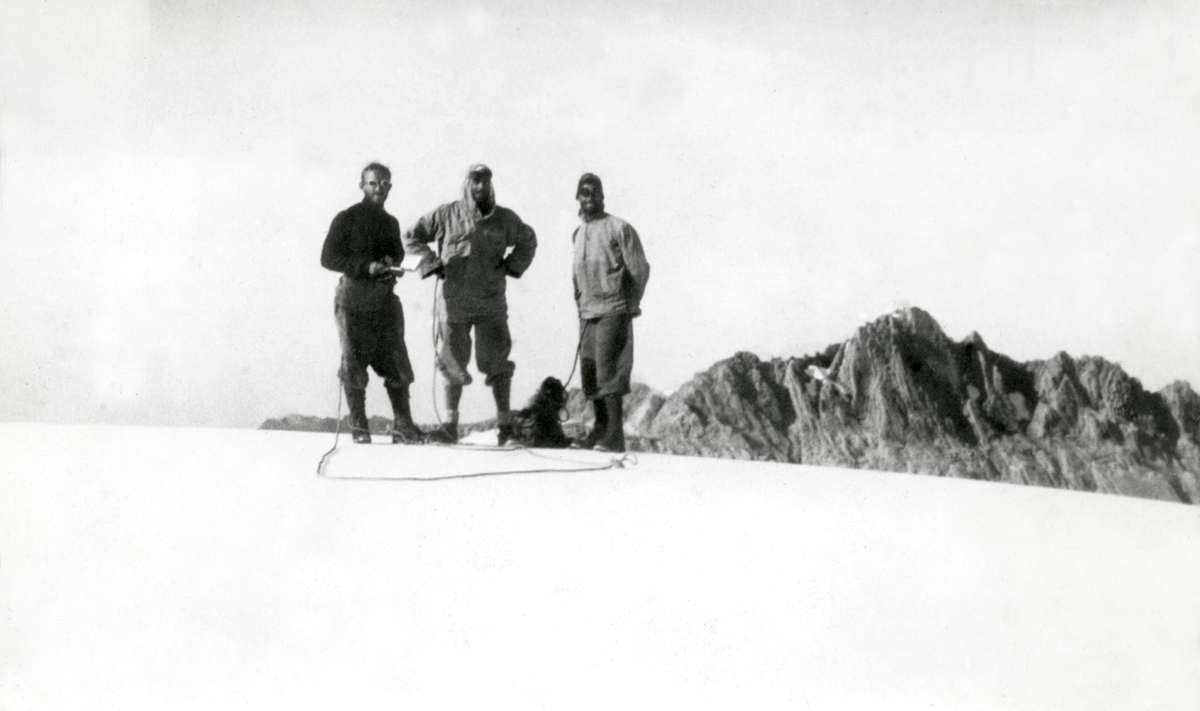
Left to right: Anton Colijn, Frits Wissel and Jean Jacques Dozy during the Carstensz expedition in 1936.

In 1936, the Dutch Carstensz expedition, unable to establish definitively which of the three summits was the highest, attempted to climb each. Anton Colijn, Jean Jacques Dozy, and Frits Wissel reached both the glacier-covered East Carstensz and Ngga Pulu summits on December 5, but, due to bad weather, failed in their attempts to climb the bare Carstensz Pyramid. Because of extensive snow melt, Ngga Pulu has become a 4,862 m (15,951 ft) subsidiary peak, but it has been estimated that in 1936 (when glaciers still covered 13 km^{2} (5.0 sq mi) of the mountain; see map) Ngga Pulu was indeed the highest summit, reaching over 4,900 m (16,100 ft).

The now-highest Carstensz Pyramid summit was not climbed until 1962, by an expedition led by the Austrian mountaineer Heinrich Harrer, New Zealand mountaineer Philip Temple, Australian rock climber Russell Kippax, and Dutch patrol officer Albertus (Bert) Huizenga. Temple had previously led an expedition into the area and pioneered the access route to the mountains.

When Indonesia took control of the province in 1963, the peak was renamed Poentja' Soekarno (Simplified Indonesian: Puncak Sukarno) or Sukarno Peak, after the then-President of Indonesia Sukarno; later this was changed to Puncak Jaya due to the subsequent de-Sukarnoization. Puncak means peak or mountain and Jaya means 'victory', 'victorious', or 'glorious'. The name Carstensz Pyramid is still used among mountaineers.

=== Access ===
Access to the peak requires a government permit. The mountain was closed to tourists and climbers between 1995 and 2005. As of 2006, access is possible through various adventure tourism agencies. Despite being among the lowest of the Seven Summits, Puncak Jaya is considered to be a technically difficult climb, requiring extensive planning, acclimatisation, mountaineering skills, and support services, due to its remoteness and sheer limestone faces. Located in an isolated area of central Papua, there are no nearby facilities, and climbers have the option to take a helicopter to the base camp and reach the summit within three to four days, or spend an additional four to five days to trek to base camp from the nearest town, Sugapa.

=== Incidents ===
In 2016, Erik Airlangga died of hypothermia while attempting the peak after getting caught in extreme weather.

In 2017, Ahmad Hadi died of hypoxemia while climbing the peak.

In the 2024 climbing season, two climbers died while attempting the summit. The first died of a suspected heart attack on 29 September. The second climber, Chinese mountaineer Dong Fei died of a fall while on the descent.

In 2025, Lilie Wijayati Poegiono and Elsa Laksono died of hypothermia while descending the summit after being trapped in extreme weather.

== See also ==
- Eight Summits
- List of elevation extremes by country
- List of highest mountains of New Guinea
- List of Southeast Asian mountains
- List of ultras of the Malay Archipelago
- Seven Summits
