= Ngga Pulu =

Summit on Mount Carstensz, Indonesia

- The North Wall Firn glacier with Ngga Pulu (flat peak, right) and Sumantri (sharp peak, center).

Highest point
- Elevation: 4,862 m (15,951 ft)
- Prominence: 100 m (330 ft)
- Coordinates: 4°3′59″S 137°11′16″E

Geography
- Location within Central Papua Location within Indonesia
- Location: Central Papua, Indonesia
- Parent range: Sudirman Range

Climbing
- First ascent: 5 December 1936 by Anton Colijn, Jean Jacques Dozy and Frits Wissel
- Easiest route: rock/snow/ice climb

Ngga Pulu is summit on the north rim of Mount Carstensz in the western part of the island of New Guinea rising 4,862 metres (15,951 ft). Trigonometric measurements showed that Ngga Pulu was (and had been for many centuries before) the highest mountain of New Guinea and also the highest summit of the Australia-New Guinea continent. The elevation of Ngga Pulu in 1936 was about 4,907 m (16,099 ft), and it was the highest and most prominent peak between the Himalaya and the Andes. However, due to glacial melting, Ngga Pulu lost a high margin of elevation in the 20th century, being surpassed by Puncak Jaya. It is surrounded by one of Indonesia's only three glaciers, including the one on Puncak Trikora.

== Name ==
Ngga Pulu is the only summit of Mount Carstensz with a regular indigenous name. Sumantri and the current summit used to be called the NW and SE peaks of Ngga Pulu. Heinrich Harrer labeled the NW peak Ngapalu on his map drawn in 1962, while calling the SE Peak (the current Ngga Pulu) Sunday Peak. When Indonesia took control of Western New Guinea in 1963, the peaks were known as Puntjak Soekarno and Puncak Jaya until the Carstensz Pyramid was established as the highest summit. Sometime after 1973 the NW summit was renamed to Sumantri, in honor of the recently deceased Minister of Energy and Mineral Resources.

== Climbing history ==
Anton Colijn, Jean Jacques Dozy and Frits Wissel reached the summit on 5 December 1936 during the Carstensz Expedition over the Northwall Firn. Subsequent ascendants were Heinrich Harrer and company in 1962 and a Japanese-Indonesian expedition in 1964.. Dick Isherwood first ascended the 600 m (2,000 ft) high north face in a solo effort in September 1972.

== Loss of elevation and ice ==
The 1936 Carstensz Expedition measured a height of 5,030 m (16,500 ft) for this summit. An Australian topographic survey in 1973 established that the 1936 barometric estimates were all between 117 and 125 m (384 and 410 ft) too high, suggesting a true height of 4,907 ± 10 m (16,099 ± 33 ft) for Ngga Pulu in 1936. All prominence key cols in the inner Carstensz area were entirely ice-covered, so the Carstensz Pyramid at the time was a just a sub-peak of Ngga Pulu, with around 200 m (660 ft) of prominence. The Australian scientific expeditions of 1971–73 measured Ngga Pulu at 4,862 m (15,951 ft), and the ice melting in the key col resulted in a prominence of around 300 m (980 ft). By the year 2000, all New Guinea glaciers outside the Carstensz area had disappeared. Inside the Carstensz area, a former sub-peak, the now rocky summit of Sumantri, is now some meters higher than the still ice-covered Ngga Pulu. Thus, now Ngga Pulu has less than 100 m (330 ft) of prominence as a sub-peak of the 4,870-metre (15,980 ft) Sumantri, which itself has a prominence around 350 m (1,150 ft). The glacial melting has produced significant elevation changes for prominence key cols in the inner Carstensz area and it is also probable that other former big ice-capped peaks in New Guinea lost various meters in elevation such as Puncak Mandala, East Carstensz Top and Ngga Pilimsit. Scientists are monitoring the glacial retreat and estimate that by about 2020–2030, all New Guinea glaciers may disappear.

== See also ==
- List of highest mountains of New Guinea
- Ngga Pulu in Google Maps

== Sources ==
- "Ngga Pulu, Indonesia" on Peakbagger
