= List of largest gold mines by production =

This is a list of the largest gold mines by 2022 annual production, measured in troy ounces.

Number	Name of mine	Production (ounces)	Production (kg)	Location	Citations
1	Olimpiada mine	1,998,000	62,144.79	Russia	
2	Grasberg mine	1,798,000	55,924.09	Indonesia	
3	Muruntau mine	1,700,000	52,875.95	Uzbekistan	
4	Carlin Trend	1,571,000	48,863.60	United States	
5	Boddington mine	813,000	25,287.15	Australia	
6	Kibali Gold Mine	749,000	23,296.52	DR Congo	
7	Detour Lake Mine	732,570	22,785.49	Canada	
8	Cortez Gold Mine	731,700	22,758.43	United States	
9	Pueblo Viejo mine	713,300	22,186.13	Dominican Republic	
10	Lihir mine	701,800	21,828.44	Papua New Guinea	

== See also ==
- List of largest mining companies by revenue
- List of largest manufacturing companies by revenue
- List of largest aluminum producers by output
- List of deepest mines
