= Snow field =

Permanent accumulation of snow and ice, usually in mountains or glaciers

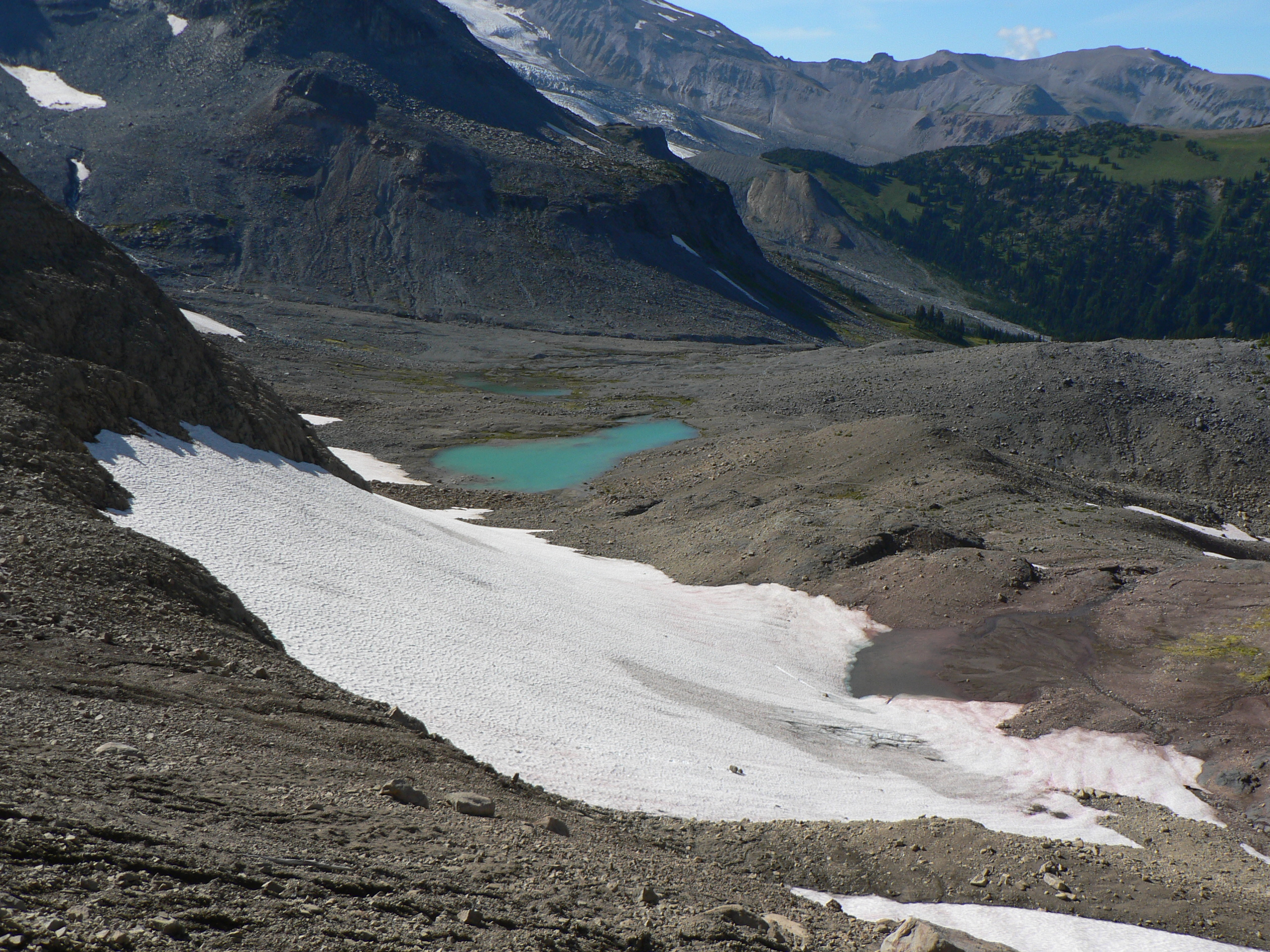
Meltwater from snowfields fill tarns on Mount Rainier.

A snow field or snowfield is an accumulation of snow and ice, typically found above the snow line, normally in mountainous and glacial terrain. It consists of old snow and névé. Snow lasting longer than a year becomes denser and is then designated as firn.

Glaciers originate in snow fields. The lower end of a glacier is usually free from snow and névé in summer. In the upper end and above the upper boundary of a glacier, the snow field is an ice field covered with snow which transforms into firn. The glacier upper boundary, where it emerges from under a snow field, is ill-defined because of gradual transition.
