= Carstensz expedition =

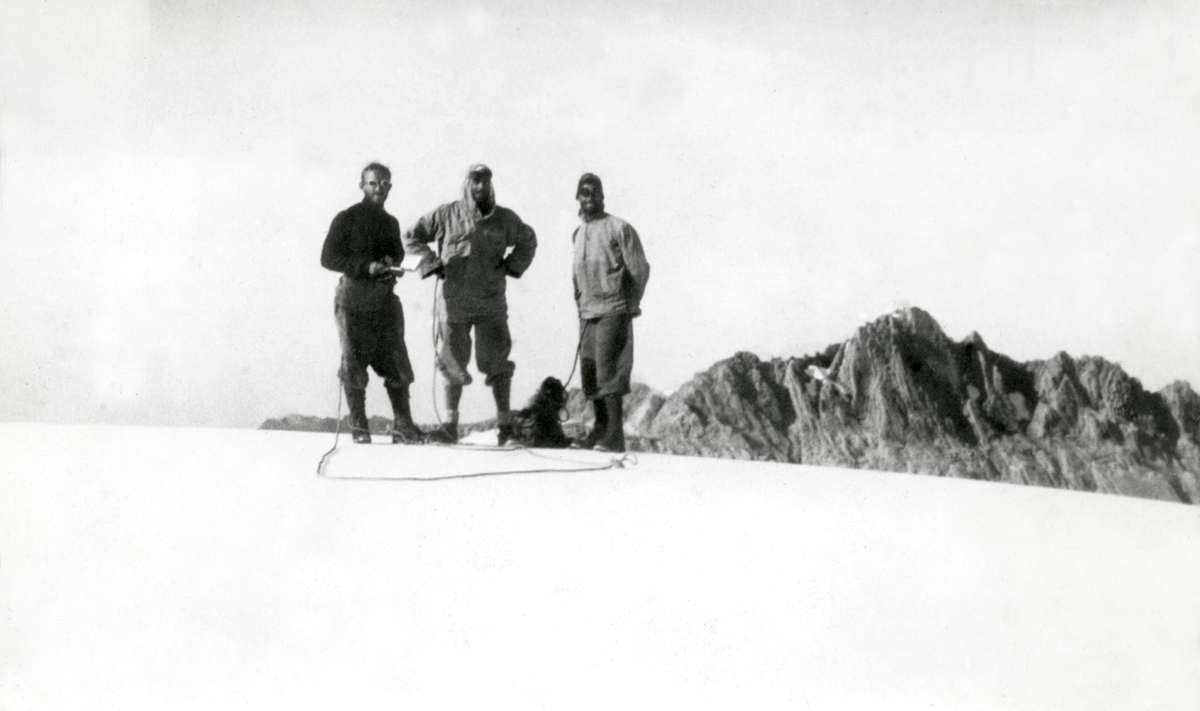
Anton Colijn, Frits Wissel and Jean Jacques Dozy during the Carstensz expedition

The Carstensz expedition was made in 1936 by Anton Colijn, Jean Jacques Dozy and Frits Wissel. They left on 29 October 1936 from Aika, a town on the southern coast of Dutch New Guinea and returned on 24 December. The aim of the expedition was reached by climbing the highest peak of the Carstenzgebergte, which at the time was the snow-covered peak of Ngga Pulu (then about 4,900 m). Since 1936, massive snow melt has caused the nearby rocky spires of Carstensz Pyramid (now Puncak Jaya) (4,884 m), which the expedition was unable to climb, to become the highest summit.

Dozy was the geologist of the expedition, and he discovered an "ore mountain", which proved the world's largest gold deposit. Because of the inhospitable area it took years before mining of the gold was started.
