= West Northwall Firn =

Glacier in Indonesia

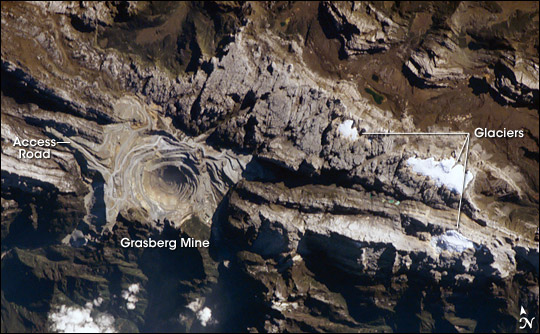
- The West Northwall Firn is the small patch of ice at right center in this 2005 image. The circular depression to the left is the Grasberg mine, the world's largest gold mine

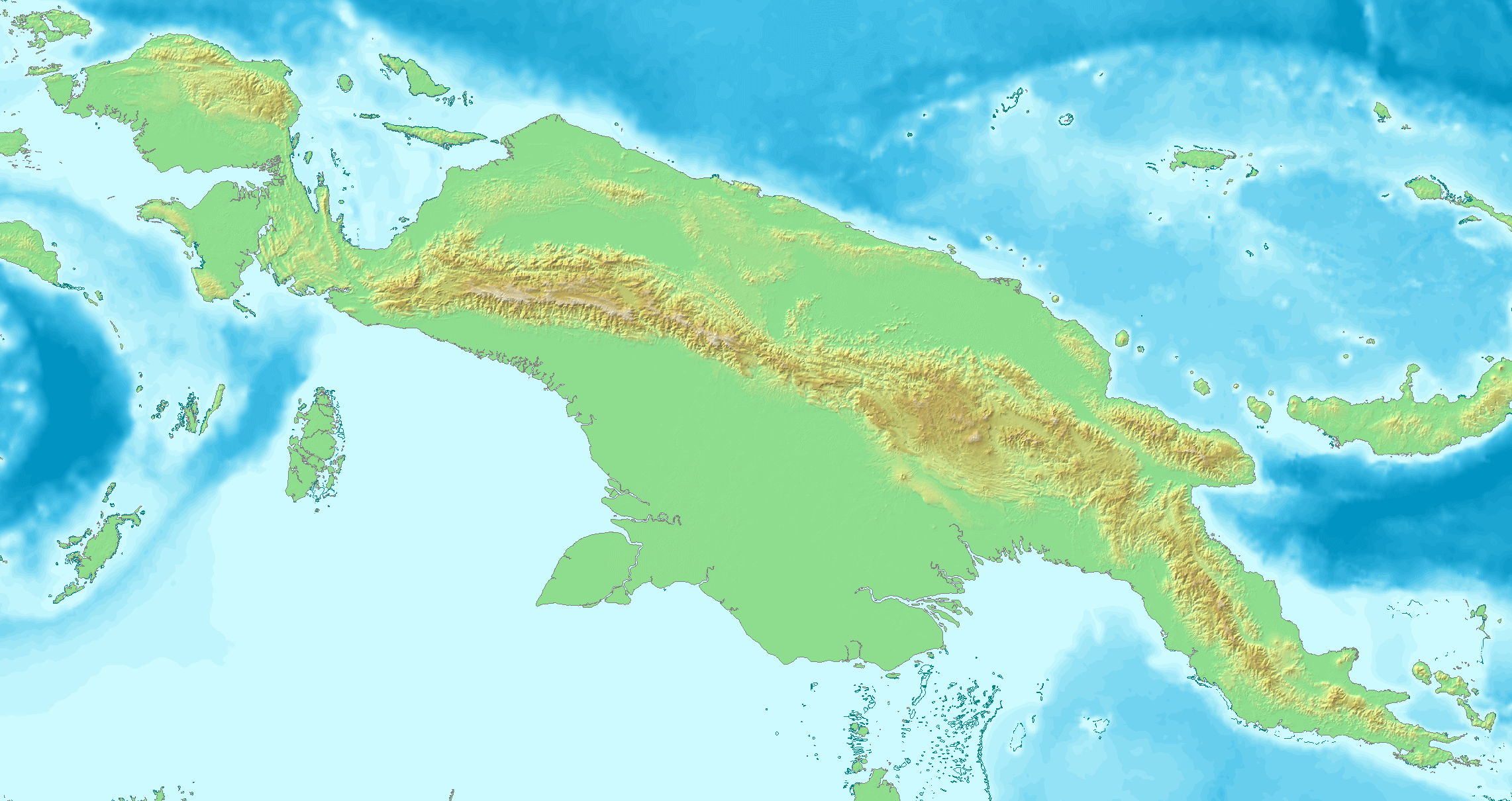
- Location within New Guinea Location within Indonesia
- Interactive map of West Northwall Firn
- Type: Mountain glacier
- Location: Puncak Jaya, Sudirman Range, Central Papua province, Indonesia
- Coordinates: 04°03′3.69″S 137°09′33.93″E
- Area: 0.28 km^{2} (0.11 sq mi) (2002)
- Terminus: Rockfall
- Status: Vanished in or before 2017

The West Northwall Firn was a glacial body on Mount Carstensz in the Sudirman Range on the island of New Guinea in Central Papua province, Indonesia. The glacier was situated at an elevation of approximately 4,600 metres (15,100 ft) to 4,750 metres (15,580 ft), centered a little over 3 kilometres (1.9 mi) northwest of Ngga Pulu and 5 kilometres (3.1 mi) of Puncak Jaya (Carstensz Pyramid), the highest peak of Oceania.

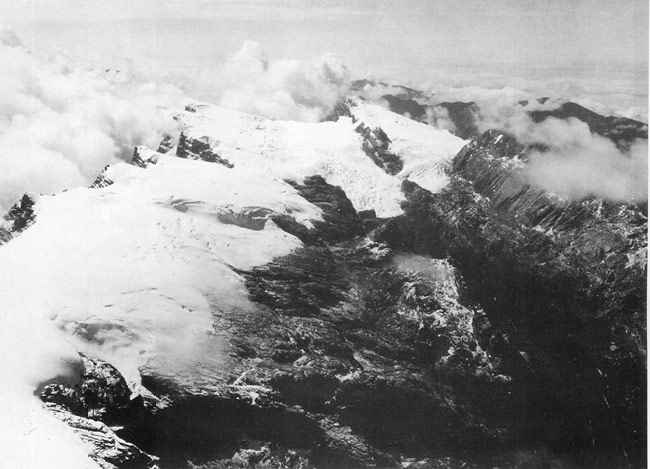
Puncak Jaya region icecap in 1936.

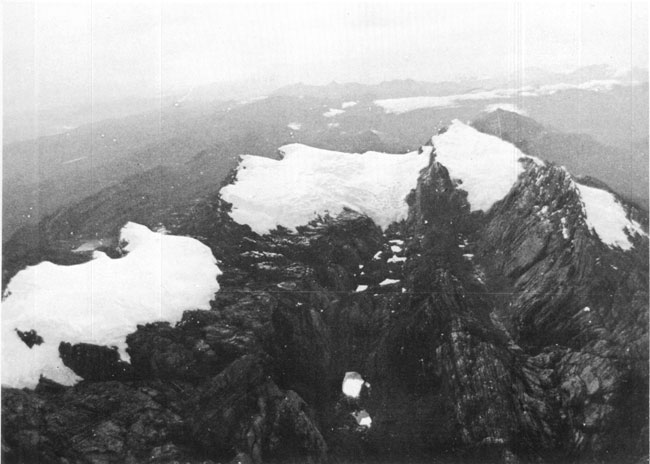
Puncak Jaya glaciers in 1972. Left to right: West Northwall Firn, East Northwall Firn, Meren Glacier, and Carstensz Glacier. The Meren Glacier disappeared before the West Northwall Firn did. See also animation.

Sometime between 1936 and 1962, a single Northwall Firn split into several separate glaciers, the largest being the West Northwall Firn and the East Northwall Firn. Research presented in 2004 of IKONOS satellite imagery of the New Guinean glaciers indicated that in the two years from 2000 to 2002, the West Northwall Firn had lost a further 19.4% of its surface area. The glacial ice on Puncak Jaya was found to be about 32 meters (105 feet) thick and thinning at a rate of 7 meters (23 feet) per year during an expedition there in 2010. At that rate, the remaining glaciers in the immediate region near Puncak Jaya were expected to last only to the year 2015. Indeed, in or before 2017, the West Northwall Firn had completely disappeared.

The West Northwall Firn was a remnant glacier of an icecap that in 1850 measured about 20 km^{2} (7.7 sq mi) and had developed approximately 5,000 years ago. At least one previous icecap also existed in the region between 15,000 and 7,000 years ago, when it also apparently melted away and disappeared.

== See also ==
- Retreat of glaciers since 1850
- List of glaciers
