= Jean Jacques Dozy =

Dutch geologist (1908–2004)

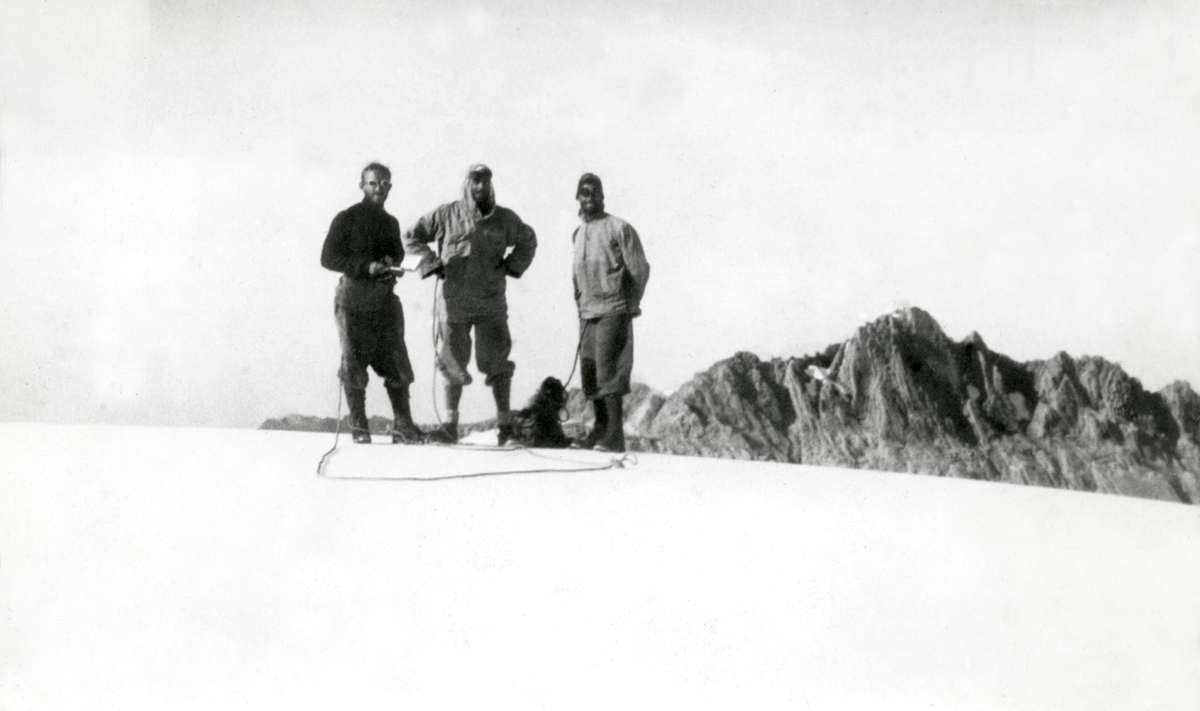
Anton Colijn, Frits Wissel and Jean Jacques Dozy during the Carstensz expedition (1936)

Jean Jacques Dozy (18 June 1908, in Rotterdam – 1 November 2004, in The Hague) was a Dutch geologist.

In 1936, he participated in the Dutch Carstensz Expedition in Dutch New Guinea to explore and climb Mount Carstensz, the highest mountain of the island of New Guinea. Besides succeeding in climbing the highest point at the time with Anton Colijn and Frits Wissel, Dozy discovered the presence of abundant copper ore in a mountain he called Ertsberg (English, "Ore mountain"). Years later this gave rise to the Grasberg copper mine. In 1939, he published an article about his find, but it was neglected due to World War II. Twenty years later, the article led to rediscovery of the Ertsberg and the development of the Ertsberg-Grasberg mine complex.
