= Lihir mine =

Gold mine in New Ireland, Papua New Guinea

- Interactive map of Lihir mine
- Location: New Ireland Province, Papua New Guinea; 3°07′55″S 152°38′29″E
- Products: Gold

The Lihir mine is one of the largest gold mines in Papua New Guinea and in the world. The mine is located in the north-east of the country in New Ireland Province. The mine has estimated reserves of 45 million oz of gold.
