= Anton Colijn =

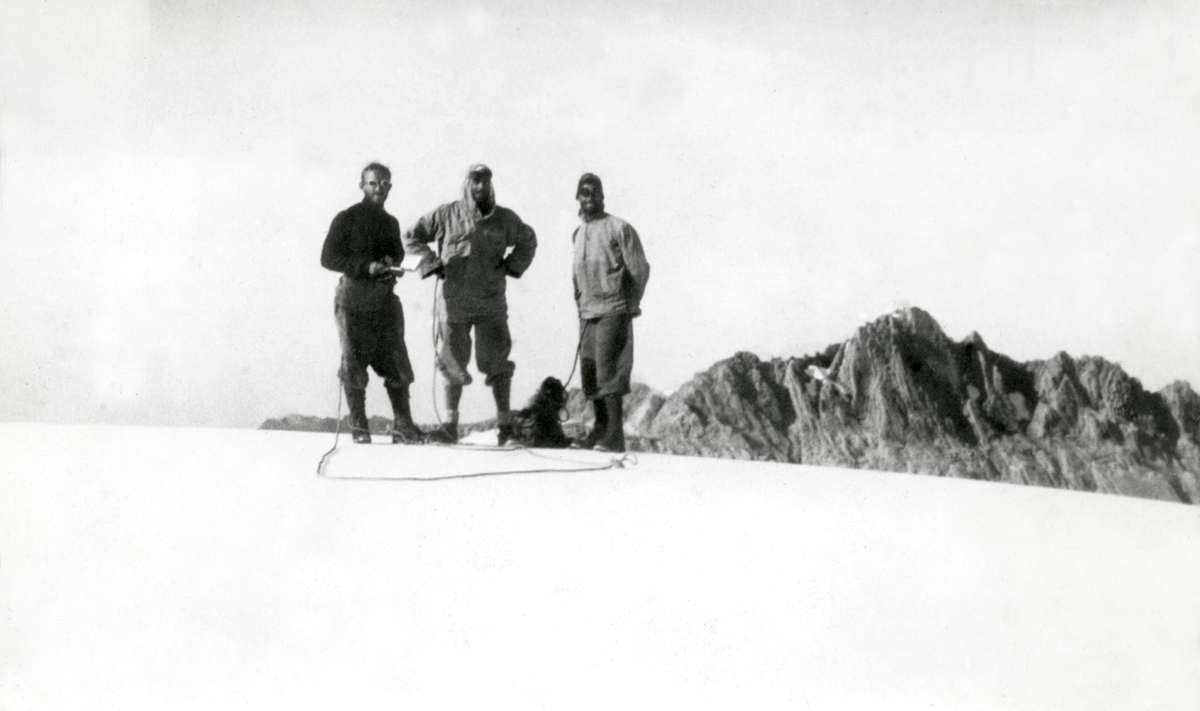
Anton Colijn, Frits Wissel and Jean Jacques Dozy during the Carstensz expedition (1936)

Antonie Hendrikus Colijn (13 April 1894 in Ambarawa – 11 March 1945 in Muntok) was a Dutch amateur mountaineer who in 1936 led the Carstensz Expedition, being the first to climb the Carstenszgebergte in New Guinea.

Colijn was the eldest son (of three) of the Hendrikus Colijn, Prime Minister of the Netherlands from 1925 to 1926 and 1933–1939.

After studying at the Free University Amsterdam and gaining his doctorate at the Delft Technical University in 1919, Colijn joined the Royal Dutch Petroleum Company and worked for them in Curaçao, in the United States, Romania and, in the 1930s, in the Dutch East Indies (now Indonesia).

He was stationed at Tarakan, an island east of Borneo when the Japanese invaded the Dutch East Indies. He assisted the destruction of oil installations before they were captured, and he was subsequently sent, under Japanese supervision, to Balikpapan, to deliver an ultimatum to the military commander there to surrender the local oil installations, intact. He was sent to Java, from where he tried to flee to Ceylon, but his ship was bombed by the Japanese. He reached the coast of Sumatra, was captured and interned at Palembang. On 11 March 1945 he died from exhaustion and illness in an internment camp at Bangka Island.

Colijn was posthumously awarded the Bronze Lion.

His wife and daughters were also interned but they survived the war. Helen Colijn, a daughter of Anton Colijn, wrote The Power of Song, a book about survival in a women's camp, upon which the film Paradise Road (1997) is based.

== Bibliography ==
- Naar de eeuwige sneeuw van tropisch Nederland: de bestijging van het Carstenszgebergte in Nederlandsch Nieuw Guinee. Amsterdam: Scheltens & Giltay, 1937 (5e druk: 1949).
- "De Nederlandsche expeditie naar de Cartensztoppen", in: De Berggids, 1937, nr.3.

== Literature ==
- Ballard, Chris, Steven Vink and Anton Ploeg, Race to the Snow; Photography and the Exploration of Dutch New Guinea, 1907-1936. Amsterdam: KIT Publishers, 2001
