= East Northwall Firn =

Glacier in Indonesia

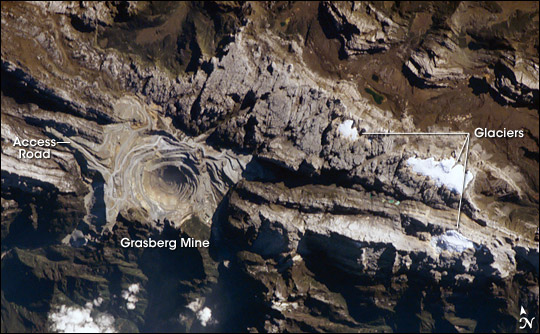
- The East Northwall Firn is below the word "glaciers" in this 2005 image. The circular depression to the left is the Grasberg mine, the world's largest gold mine.

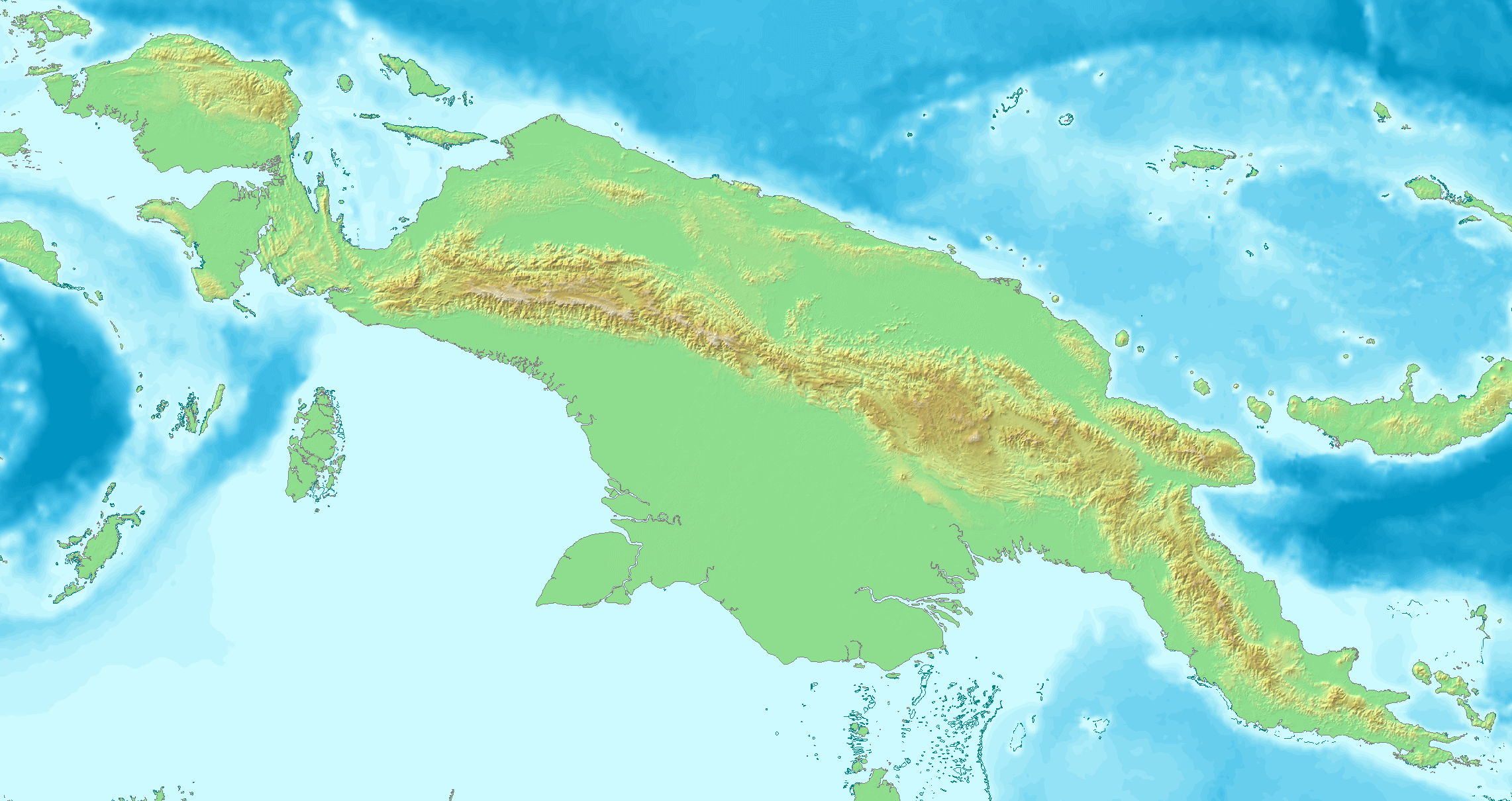
- Location within New Guinea Location within Indonesia
- Interactive map of East Northwall Firn
- Type: Mountain glacier
- Location: Puncak Jaya, Sudirman Range, Central Papua province, Indonesia
- Coordinates: 04°03′54.82″S 137°10′49.87″E
- Area: 0.09 km^{2} (0.035 sq mi) in November 2025
- Length: 360 m (1,180 ft) for the central patch
- Terminus: Rockfall
- Status: Retreating

The East Northwall Firn was a glacier on Mount Carstensz in the Sudirman Range on the island of New Guinea in Central Papua province, Indonesia. Situated at an elevation of approximately 4,750 metres (15,580 ft) 2.5 kilometres (1.6 mi) NNW of Puncak Jaya, the highest summit in Oceania. It broke up in three patches in or before 2017.

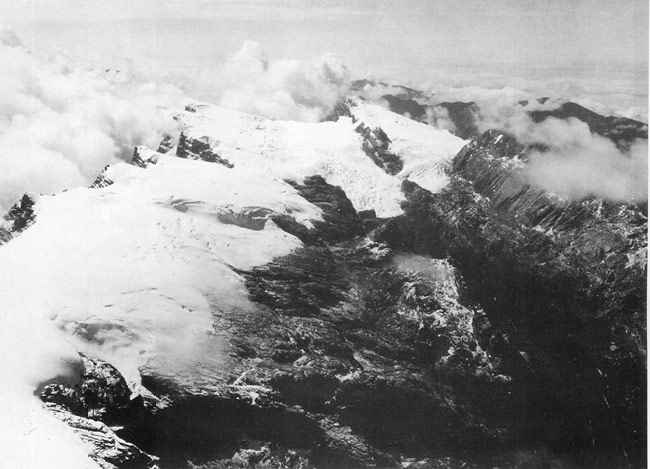
Puncak Jaya region icecap in 1936.

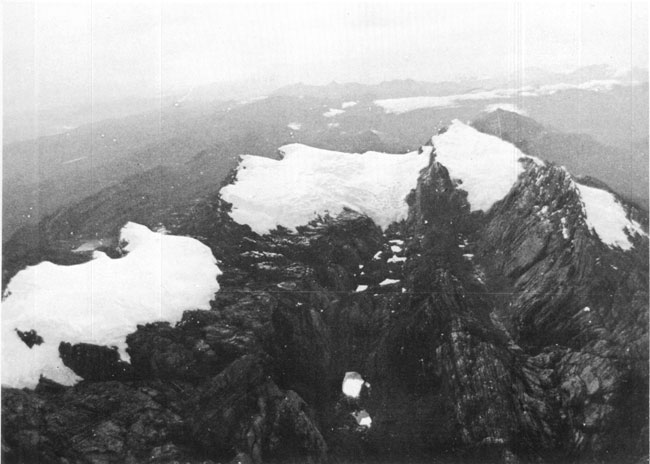
Puncak Jaya glaciers in 1972. Left to right: West Northwall Firn, East Northwall Firn, Meren Glacier, and Carstensz Glacier. The first and third have now disappeared. See also animation.

Sometime between 1936 and 1962, a single Northwall Firn split into several separate glaciers, the largest being the East Northwall Firn and the West Northwall Firn. Research presented in 2004 of IKONOS satellite imagery of the New Guinean glaciers indicated that in the two years from 2000 to 2002, the East Northwall Firn had lost a further 4.5% of its surface area. An expedition to the remaining glaciers on Puncak Jaya in 2010 discovered that the ice on the glaciers there is about 32 metres (105 ft) thick and thinning at a rate of 7 metres (23 ft) annually. At that rate, the remaining glaciers in the immediate region near Puncak Jaya were expected to last only to the year 2015. Indeed, in or before 2017, the West Northwall Firn had completely disappeared and the eastern Firn had broken up in three small patches.

The East Northwall Firn glaciers are remnants of an icecap that in 1850 measured about 20 km^{2} (7.7 sq mi) and had developed approximately 5,000 years ago. At least one previous icecap also existed in the region between 15,000 and 7,000 years ago.

Characteristics of the glacier's three patches
Patch	Area	Length
West	0.02 km^{2} (0.0077 sq mi)	210 m (690 ft)
Central	0.05 km^{2} (0.019 sq mi)	350 m (1,150 ft)
East	0.02 km^{2} (0.0077 sq mi)	320 m (1,050 ft)

Evolution of the Glacier
Date	Total Area	Maximum Length
November 2024	0.11 km^{2} (0.042 sq mi)	406 m (1,332 ft)
November 2025	0.09 km^{2} (0.035 sq mi)	350 m (1,150 ft)

== See also ==
- Retreat of glaciers since 1850
- List of glaciers
