= Three Peaks =

Three Peaks may refer to:

== Sports and challenges ==
- Three Peaks Challenge, a trail run or hiking challenge in the mountains of Cape Town, South Africa
- Three Peaks Bike Race, an ultra-distance bikepacking race across the Alps and the Pyrenees in Europe

=== United Kingdom ===
- National Three Peaks Challenge, a mountain endurance challenge in Great Britain
- Three Peaks Yacht Race, a sailing and running race in the United Kingdom
- Yorkshire Three Peaks, the mountains of Whernside, Ingleborough, and Pen-y-ghent, visited on the Three Peaks Walk
  - Three Peaks Race, a fell race over those three peaks
  - Three Peaks Cyclo-Cross, an annual cyclo-cross event

=== Australia ===
- Australian Three Peaks Race, a sailing and running event in Tasmania
- SCODY 3 Peaks Challenge, a one-day road cycling event in northeast Victoria

== Other ==
- Three Peaks (film), a 2017 film

== See also ==
- Tri Peaks (disambiguation)
- Trimountain (disambiguation)
- Trikuta, a holy mountain in India
- Tre Cime di Lavaredo, a mountain in the Auronzo Dolomites of northeastern Italy
- Five Peaks Challenge
