= Ian McKeever =

Ian McKeever may refer to:

- Ian McKeever (artist) (born 1946), British artist
- Ian McKeever (mountaineer) (1970–2013), Irish mountaineer
