= Australian Three Peaks Race =

The Australian Three Peaks Race is a short-handed offshore sailing and endurance mountain running event that was held in Tasmania, the southernmost state of Australia, over the Easter long weekend. The first race was in 1989 and the race was conducted annually until Easter 2013.

In October 2025 a bid to revive the race commenced with a call for expressions of interest. Following an enthusiastic response from potential runners, sailors, volunteers and supporters, an agreement was signed between the Australian Three Peaks Race Inc and The Royal Yacht Club of Tasmania (RYCT) to conduct the race to start at Easter 2027.

It was a non-stop event, commencing at Beauty Point just north of Launceston on the Tamar River, during which runners were transported by yacht finishing in the Tasmanian capital city some three to four days later. Teams of three sailors and two runners often comprising members of armed forces, professions, youth or other groups would compete against teams from the general sailing and running communities.

The course took teams from the northern Tasmanian port of Beauty Point to Hobart in the south. Three sailing legs and three endurance running legs took the yachts and their teams past some of Tasmania's spectacular coastal scenery including the highest sea cliffs in the Southern Hemisphere soaring some 300 metres.

- 90 nmi to Flinders Island (settlement of Lady Barron) in Bass Strait where two runners proceed to the top of Mount Strzelecki (65 km run; 756 m ascent);
- 145 nmi to Coles Bay where two runners scale Mount Freycinet (33 km run; 620 m ascent); and
- 100 nmi to Hobart on the River Derwent where two runners top Mount Wellington (33 km run; 1270 m ascent), and finishing in Hobart.

The race course was approximately:

- Sail: 335 nm;
- Run: 131 km;
- Ascent: 2646 m.

The concept of the race is similar to the British Barmouth to Fort William Three Peaks Yacht Race. The Australian race was inaugurated in 1989 after a Tasmanian team competed in the 1987 British event. The race has been an annual event for 25 years until the last race was conducted in 2013. Changes in social patterns have affected many offshore sailing races in Australia in recent years and the Three Peaks Race was no exception failing to attract a viable number of entrants. The organising committee made the painful decision to defer running the event until economic and social pressures ease to make the race again viable.

== Events by Year ==
=== H W (Bill) Tilman Trophy Winners ===
The Tilman Trophy has been a keenly contested section of the race. The trophy is named after the famed Harold William (Bill) Tilman CBE, DSO, MC, FRGS, FRIN Soldier, Mountaineer, Explorer, Sailor 1898–1977 who was the first President of the United Kingdom-based Barmouth to Fort William Three Peaks Yacht Race. The UK organising committee in 1989 kindly donated a silver tray trophy to be awarded to the first team to win the race based on a points system that favoured older teams, older yachts and all round participation.

- 2013: Whistler, David Rees
- 2012: Centre Euro Wines, David Allan
- 2011: Team Cradle Mountain Chateau, David Allan
- 2010: Team CommunityCarbon, Jeff Dusting, Rick Pacey, Graham Smith, Stuart Jacobson, Travis Tremayne
- 2009: Team Chance, Bob Grant and team
- 2008: Team Stornoway, Richard Gardner
- 2007 PRD Nationwide Tamar Valley, Greg Hall
- 2006 Alize, Phillip Amos
- 2005 Liberte, Anthony Cook
- 2004 Misty, Brian Claque
- 2003 Downing Street, Andrew Ostler
- 2002 Mobil Kingston Beach, Angus Sprott
- 2001 Camp Quality, Benny Parsons
- 2000 Camp Quality, Benny Parsons
- 1999 Underwater Video Systems, Jeff Cordell
- 1998 Brigitta Bits 4 Boats, Peter Crawford
- 1997 Tamar Marine, Rob Giblin
- 1996 Every One An Original, Angus Sprott
- 1995 MMI Insurance, John Saul
- 1994 Southern Cross Network II, Greg Prescott
- 1993 Coles Bay Business, Glenn Myler
- 1992 French Pine, Peter Crawford/Ron Brooker
- 1991 Underwater Video Systems, Kerry Boden
- 1990 Risky Business, Richard Edmunds
- 1989 Budget Rent-A-Car, Don Calvert

=== Overall Race winners ===
- 2013: Euphoria Furniture, Steve Laird
- 2012: Big Wave Rider, Bruce Arms (skipper), Jessica Watson
- 2011: Peccadillo, Charles Meredith
- 2010: Team Whistler, David Rees
- 2009: Neil Buckby Motors Subaru, Phillip Marshall
- 2008: Shearwater Pure Sprouts, Phillip Marshall
- 2007: Neil Buckby Motors, Phillip Marshall
- 2006: Marshall Engineering, Phillip Marshall
- 2005: Elite Renovations, Phillip Marshall
- 2004: Orana Respite Mersey Pharmacy, Robin Chamberlin & Terry Travers
- 2003: API Mersey Pharmacy, Robin Chamberlin & Terry Travers
- 2002: API Mersey Pharmacy, Robin Chamberlin & Terry Travers
- 2001: API Mersey Pharmacy, Robin Chamberlin & Terry Travers
- 2000: Haphazard, Nick Edmunds
- 1999: Computerland, John Saul
- 1998: Business Post Naiad, Bruce Guy
- 1997: Computerland, John Saul
- 1996: Optus World, John Saul
- 1995: Southern Cross News, Richard Edmunds
- 1994: Redbook Performance Plus Carpets, Ken Gourlay
- 1993: Windswept, Martin Pryor
- 1992: Ronstan Wild Thing, Grant Wharington
- 1991: Hazadatas, Nick Edmunds
- 1990: Ericsson, Rob Cassidy
- 1989: Inaugural winner Verbatim, Ian Johnston, Cathy Hawkins

== See also ==
- Three Peaks
