= Pat Morrow =

Pat Morrow may refer to:

- Pat Morrow (actress) (born 1944), American member of Peyton Place cast, a/k/a Patricia Morrow
- Pat Morrow (mountaineer) (born 1952), Canadian photographer and climber, a/k/a Patrick Morrow
