= Geordie Stewart =

British climber

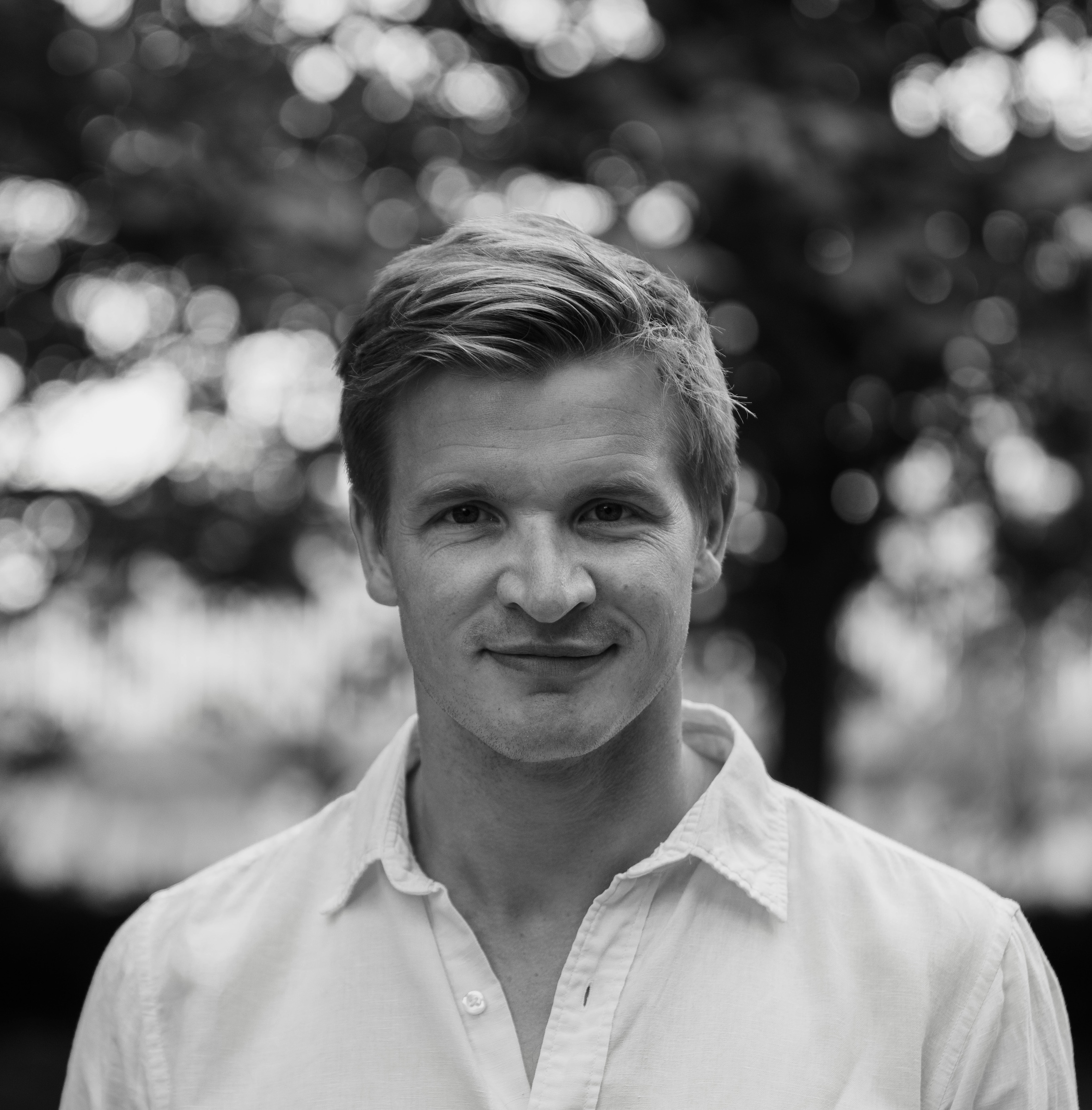

Geordie Stewart (born 1989 in London) is a British explorer, endurance athlete, and former British Army officer. In May 2011, aged 22, he became the youngest Briton to climb the Seven Summits – the highest mountain on each of the seven continents. In October 2019, he completed a 22,501-mile solo cycle around the world.

== Seven Summits ==
Aged 18 he became one of the youngest Britons ever to summit Aconcagua, the highest mountain in South America. He then attempted a solo climb of Mount Kilimanjaro in May 2008 and reached the summit on his 19th birthday. His last expedition before starting at the University of St Andrews, was to Russia, where he reached the highest point in Europe, by summiting Mount Elbrus.

In July 2009, he climbed the highest mountain in North America, Denali, before attempting Mount Everest the following year. Geordie got to within 150m of the summit before turning around.

Over Christmas 2010, he climbed Vinson Massif in Antarctica, before completing the 6th mountain in his Seven Summits attempt, Carstensz Pyramid, Indonesia in March. Geordie returned to Everest in spring 2011 and became the youngest Briton to climb the Seven Summits.

Geordie climbed in aid of Help for Heroes and the Royal National Lifeboat Institution. His first four climbs were self-funded; the remaining three were sponsored.

During the finale of his Seven Summits attempt, Geordie filmed a one-off documentary, The Ultimate Climb, for Discovery Channel, which aired in May 2012.

== Around the World Cycle ==
In August 2018, Geordie departed the UK to begin a long-distance cycle tour. He rode solo across four continents for 430 days and covered 22,500 miles. Geordie returned home to London in October 2019 having successfully completed his attempt to cycle around the world.

== Writing ==
In Search of Sisu: A Path to Contentment via the Highest Point on Every Continent, was published in July 2018. The book covers his Seven Summits journey on and off the mountains.

A Rolling Stone: Taking the Road Less Travelled, was published in October 2020. The book covers part of Geordie's cycle around the world. It was described by Sir Ranulph Fiennes as, “A captivating insight into the mind of a solo traveller."

His third book, Hurry Up and Wait: The Secret Life of a Sandhurst Cadet was published in September 2022 by Unicorn Publishing. Hurry Up and Wait provides a peek behind the curtain of the 44-week commissioning course at the Royal Military Academy Sandhurst. It was described by General Lord Richards of Herstmonceux as, “Irreverent, honest, hilarious, but serious too."
