= Susan Ershler =

American businesswoman and mountain climber

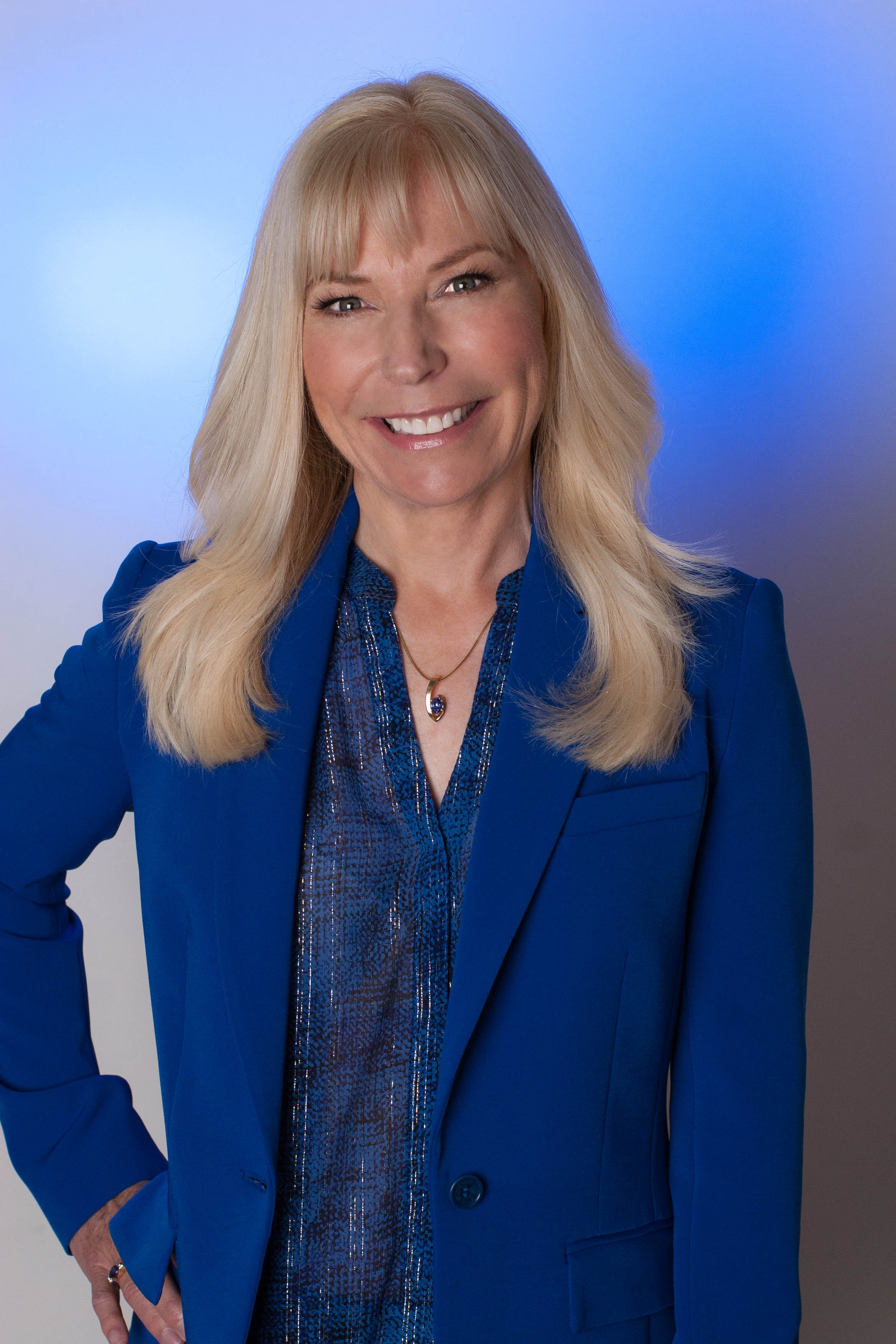
- Born: Portland, Oregon, U.S.
- Education: Washington State University
- Spouse: Phil Ershler
- Website: susanershler.com

Susan Ershler is an American mountain climber, author, and motivational speaker. On May 16, 2002, Ershler and her husband Phil (the first American to ascend the north face of Everest), reached the summit of Everest, completing the ascent of the highest mountain on each continent (the Seven Summits).

== Books ==
- Ershler, Susan; Ershler, Phil (2009). Together on Top of the World. Grand Central Publishing.
- Ershler, Susan; Waechter, John (2014). Conquering the Seven Summits of Sales. HarperCollins.
