= Tri Peaks =

Tri Peaks may refer to:

- Tri Peaks (game), a card game
- Tri Peaks (Santa Monica Mountains), mountain in the Santa Monica Mountains

== See also ==
- Three Peaks (disambiguation)
- Trimountain (disambiguation)
