= William Hackett (mountaineer) =

American mountaineer (1918–1999)

William D. Hackett (1918–1999) was an American mountaineer.

== Biography ==
Hackett grew up in Portland (Oregon) and began climbing at age 14. In the Army in World War II, he served more than three years in the 10th Mountain Division. After World War II, he remained in regular Army for 21 years.

In 1956 Hackett was the first person to reach five of the Seven Summits. He climbed Mount McKinley (1947), Aconcagua (1949), Kilimanjaro (1950), Mount Kosciuszko (1956) and Mont Blanc (1956). In that time, the Mont Blanc was considered to be the highest mountain of the European continent. Hackett made an attempt to climb Mount Vinson and obtained a permit for the Mount Everest in 1960 but due to several circumstances (frostbite, lack of funds, etc.) he never made it more than five.

Hackett was the first person to reach the summits of both Mount McKinley and Mount Logan. He was the first American to climb Aconcagua and the first American to climb Mount Kenya.

While still serving with the Army's Ground Forces, Lt. Hackett’s Mount McKinley climb in 1947 was part of Operation White Tower 1947. Operation White Tower was sponsored by RKO Radio Pictures and served two purposes: to get snow pictures while testing high altitude photography and to conduct scientific testing of cosmic ray effects in addition to performing geological surveys of the area.

In 1952, Capt. Hackett agreed to carry several nuclear plates to the Denali Pass to help Brad Washburn, who was on the 1947 Mount McKinley climb, conduct research on the effects of cosmic rays. The plates had a special coating that would record the effects as the rays hit the Earth.

After an Air Force plane crashed east of Anchorage, Alaska, on November 22, 1952, killing all 52 people aboard, Hackett was part of a recovery team that climbed to search for survivors. Because of blizzard conditions and potential for an avalanche, it was December 9 before the team located the tail section. No survivors or additional wreckage were found in the vicinity.

In 1989, Maj. William D. Hackett, U.S. Army (retired) was inducted as an honorary member of the Mazamas, a non-profit for mountaineering education.

== Notable ascents and expeditions ==
- Mount McKinley, South Summit (06.06.1947) and North Summit (06.07.1947) with Bradford Washburn
- Aconcagua, 1949 Hackett first US climber on the highest mountain of South America
- Mount McKinley, 07.10.1951 FA West Buttress route with Bradford Washburn and team
- K2, American-German Expedition 1960
- Antarctica, Canadian-American expedition to Antarctica (Mount Vinson)
