= Seven Summits =

Set of highest mountains on each of the seven continents

A map of the Seven Summits, including variants that may or may not be included depending on the definition used (see below)

The Seven Summits are the highest mountains on each of the seven traditional continents. On 30 April 1985, Richard Bass became the first climber to reach the summit of all seven.

In January 2023, Climbing said "Today, the Seven Summits are a relatively common—almost cliché—tour of each continent's highest peak", and while reaching the peak of the "Seven Summits" is no longer considered a significant achievement amongst mountaineers, it remains a popular challenge for "adventure mountaineers" using expedition climbing techniques.

== Definitions ==
The Seven Summits consist of the highest mountain peak on each of the continents. Different lists include slight variations, but generally, the same core is maintained. The seven summits depend on the definition used for a continent – in particular the location of the border of that continent. This results in two major points of variation. The first one is Mont Blanc versus Mount Elbrus for Europe, which depends on whether the crest of the Greater Caucasus Mountains is taken to define the Greater Caucasus watershed which marks the continental boundary between Asia and Europe for the region between the Black and Caspian seas; this classification would place Mount Elbrus in Europe. The second one is Puncak Jaya (also known as "Carstensz Pyramid") versus Mount Kosciuszko for the continent of Australia, which depends on whether one includes the Sahul Shelf or only mainland Australia as the continent. This also gives rise to another list called the "Eight Summits", which includes both Puncak Jaya and Mount Kosciuszko along with the six summits on the other continents.

This creates several possible versions of the seven summits:

- Everest, Aconcagua, Denali, Kilimanjaro, Vinson, Elbrus, Mount Wilhelm (Continent)
- Everest, Aconcagua, Denali, Kilimanjaro, Vinson, Elbrus, Kosciuszko (the Bass version)
- Everest, Aconcagua, Denali, Kilimanjaro, Vinson, Elbrus, Puncak Jaya (the Messner version)
- Everest, Aconcagua, Denali, Kilimanjaro, Vinson, Mont Blanc, Mount Wilhelm (the Wilhelm version)
- Everest, Aconcagua, Denali, Kilimanjaro, Vinson, Mont Blanc, Kosciuszko (the 1950s explorer Hackett version)
- Everest, Aconcagua, Denali, Kilimanjaro, Vinson, Mont Blanc, Puncak Jaya
- Everest, Aconcagua, Denali, Kilimanjaro, Vinson, Mauna Kea, Puncak Jaya / Kosciuszko (the tectonic version)

The concept Richard Bass and his climbing partner Frank Wells were pursuing was to be the first to stand atop the highest mountain on each continent. They pursued this goal as they defined it, climbing Aconcagua for South America, Denali for North America, Kilimanjaro for Africa, Elbrus for Europe, Vinson for Antarctica, Kosciuszko for Australia, and finally Everest for Asia.

=== Safety and climbing preference ===
In terms of safety and preference for climbers, the Russian invasion of Ukraine has affected Western climbers' ability to travel to Russia, making Elbrus less attractive. Similarly, Puncak Jaya on New Guinea has been closed due to security concerns and the risks posed by ongoing tribal conflicts and mining operations. These challenges have prevented climbers from accessing the area, further complicated by a security lockdown since August 2019. The situation escalated in February 2023 when Papuan rebels of Free Papua Movement took New Zealand pilot Philip Mark Mehrtens hostage, an event known as Nduga hostage crisis, signaling a new level of risk for foreigners in the highlands of Western New Guinea. The rebels' declaration of "all foreigners are now target" marked an intensification of the conflict, making travel to Western New Guinea highly advised against. Consequently, many climbers postponed their expedition to climb Carstensz Pyramid until the regional conflict subsides.

In summary, the Mount Wilhelm version of the Seven Summits currently presents the safest option for climbers, avoiding travel to Russia and Western New Guinea. Papua New Guinea remains a relatively safer option for mountaineers, and Mount Wilhelm offers an excellent high mountain expedition experience as the highest peak in Oceania.

=== Definition using tectonic plates ===
Tectonic plates (see list of tectonic plates)

Using the largest tectonic plates, Asia and Europe could be grouped as Eurasia, and the very large Pacific Plate would have Mauna Kea as its highest mountain. Puncak Jaya is actually on the Maoke Plate, while Mount Wilhelm is, depending upon evolving plate tectonic understanding, on either the Trobriand Plate, Solomon Sea Plate, or Woodlark Plate, all of whom were historically grouped with the larger Australian Plate. If not, then Mount Kosciuszko would revert to being the highest of that plate (see also list of highest points of Oceanian countries).

- African Plate – Kilimanjaro
- Antarctic Plate – Vinson
- Australian Plate – Puncak Jaya / Kosciuszko
- Eurasian Plate – Mount Everest
- North American Plate – Denali
- Pacific Plate – Mauna Kea
- South American Plate – Aconcagua

== Oceania ==
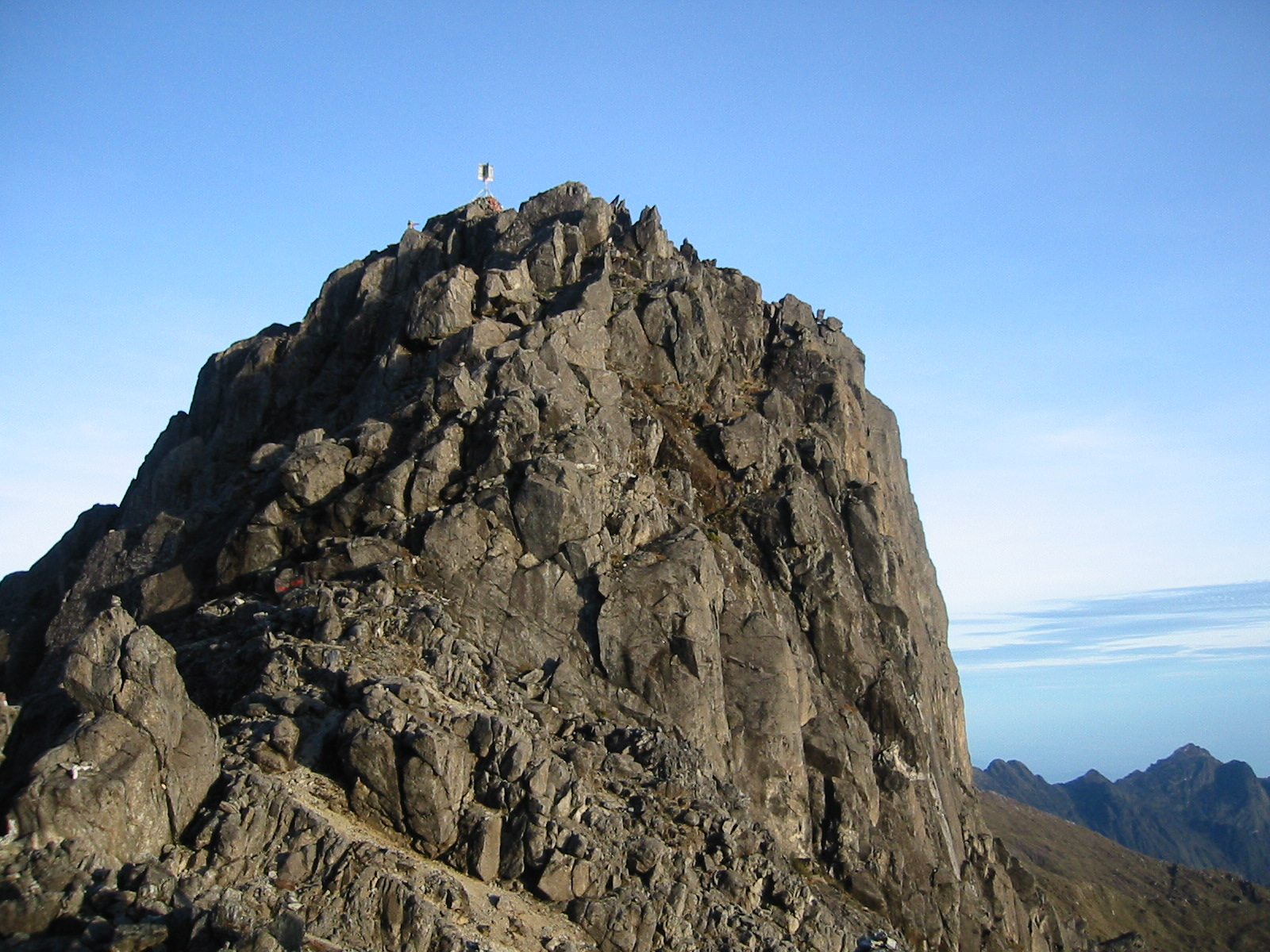
Mount Wilhelm

The highest mountain in mainland Australia is Mount Kosciuszko, 2,228 metres (7,310 ft) above sea level. However, the highest mountain on the Australian continent, which also includes New Guinea, is Puncak Jaya (Carstensz Pyramid), 4,884 m (16,024 ft) above sea level, (Note: A higher elevation of 5,030 m (16,503 ft) still appears on some maps and sites, but is accepted by neither Indonesia nor the mountaineering community, nor is it supported by modern surveys. High resolution IFSAR data supplied by Intermap shows no cell higher than 4,863 m (15,955 ft). See also Australian Universities' Expedition (section 2, page 4).) in the Indonesian province of Central Papua on the island of New Guinea, which shares the Sahul continental shelf with Australia. Mount Kosciuszko is considerably easier to climb, requiring only a four-hour, grade 3 return walk from the nearest car park, while Puncak Jaya requires a mountaineering expedition with technical climbing, an approach through dense jungle and the need to charter an aircraft.

Some sources claim Mount Wilhelm (4,509 m (14,793 ft)) in Papua New Guinea's Bismarck Range (on the island of New Guinea, like Puncak Jaya) as the highest mountain on the Australian continent, on account of Indonesia being a part of Asia (see list of Southeast Asian mountains, which includes Puncak Jaya and other mountains in Western New Guinea, Indonesia). However, such a definition is political, not geophysical, and would mean that the western part of New Guinea changed continents in 1969.

In terms of Australia as a country, Mawson Peak (2,745 m (9,006 ft)) is higher than Kosciuszko. However, it is not located in Oceania, but in the Australian external territory of Heard Island and McDonald Islands in the southern Indian Ocean. Mt McClintock (3,490 m (11,450 ft)) is located within the claimed Australian Antarctic Territory and is the highest peak within territory claimed by Australia, but it is again not in Oceania. If the island of New Guinea is excluded, then Mount Cook on the South Island of New Zealand is the highest mountain in Australasia at 3,724 m (12,218 ft).

Entities listing Mount Wilhelm as the highest point in Oceania or showing boundaries putting Puncak Jaya in Asia include the United Nations, the website 7 Continent Summits, World Atlas, the CIA World Factbook, Canada Atlas, and Papua New Guinea PNG Trekking.

== Europe ==
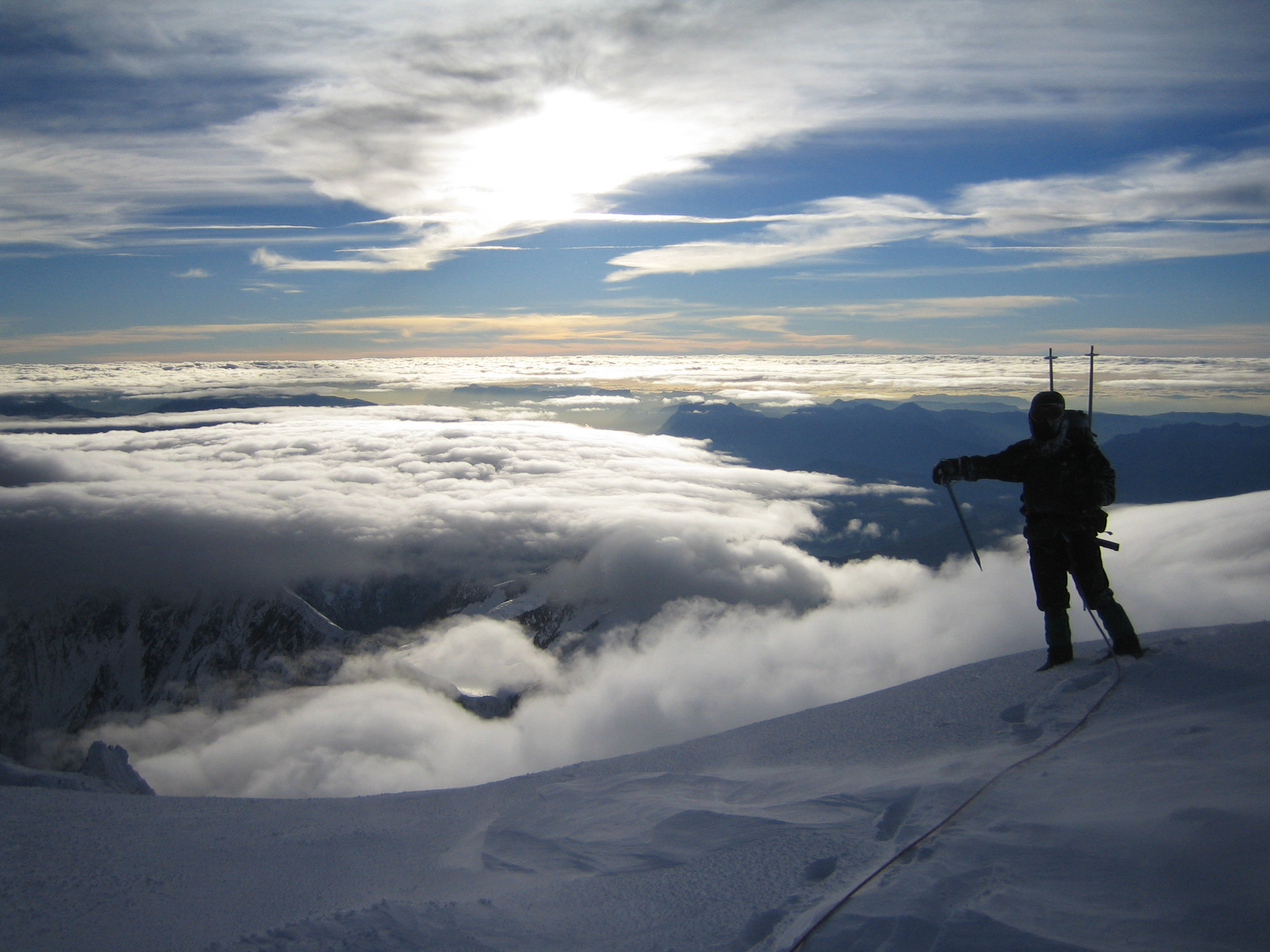
Mont Blanc summit

The generally accepted highest summit in Europe is Mount Elbrus (5,642 m or 18,510 ft) in the Caucasus, appearing on both the Bass and Messner lists. However, because the location of the boundary between Asia and Europe is not universally agreed upon, its inclusion in Europe is disputed: if the Kuma–Manych Depression is used as the geological border between Asia and Europe, the Caucasus and Elbrus lie wholly in Asia. If the Greater Caucasus watershed is used instead, Elbrus' peaks are wholly in Europe, albeit close to the border with Asia. Mont Blanc (4,810 m or 15,781 ft), lying on the border between France and Italy in the Graian Alps, is seen by some to be the highest mountain in Europe.

== North America ==
Denali (Mount McKinley) is the highest mountain peak in North America. The Caribbean Plate and the Panama Plate, both of which share geological processes with the North American continent, have their own highest mountain peaks:

- North America – Denali (6,194 m or 20,322 ft)
- Caribbean Plate – Acatenango Volcano (3,976 m or 13,045 ft)
- Panama Plate – Mount Chirripó (3,819 m or 12,530 ft)

== South America ==
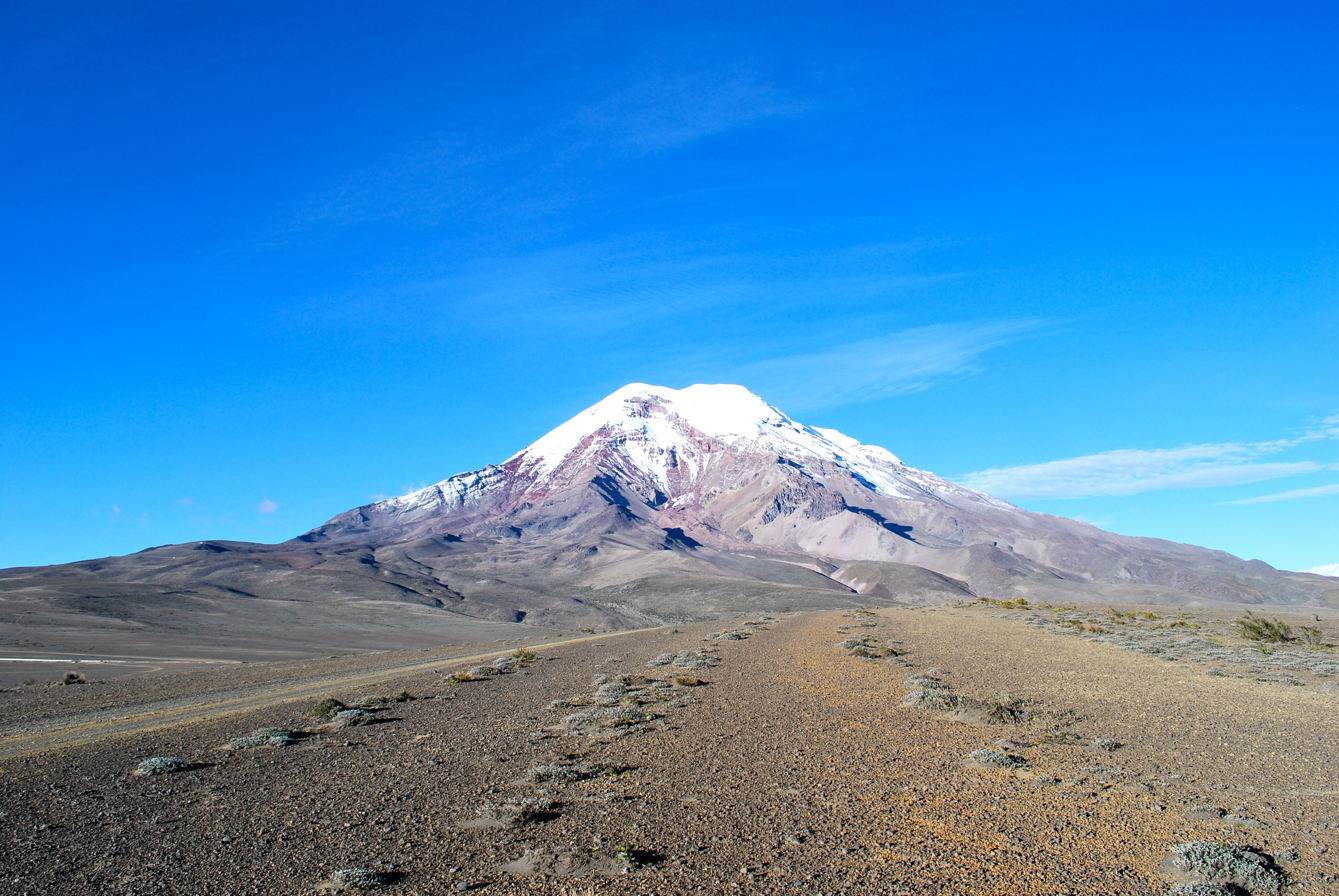
Chimborazo, the farthest peak from the center of Earth and probably the greatest of the North Andes Plate

Aconcagua is the highest mountain peak in South America. The Altiplano Plate and the North Andes Plate, both of which share geological processes with the South American continent, have their own highest mountain peaks:

- South America – Aconcagua (6,961 m or 22,838 ft)
- Altiplano Plate – presumably Nevado Sajama (6,542 m or 21,463 ft)
- North Andes Plate – Chimborazo (6,263 m or 20,548 ft)

== Bass and Messner lists ==
The first Seven Summits list as postulated by Bass (the Bass or Kosciusko list) chose the highest mountain of mainland Australia, Mount Kosciuszko (2,228 m or 7,310 ft), to represent the Australian continent's highest summit. Reinhold Messner postulated another list (the Messner or Carstensz list), replacing Mount Kosciuszko with Indonesia's Puncak Jaya, or Carstensz Pyramid (4,884 m or 16,024 ft). Neither the Bass nor the Messner list includes Mont Blanc. From a mountaineering point of view, the Messner list is the more challenging one. Climbing Carstensz Pyramid has the character of an expedition, whereas the ascent of Kosciuszko is an easy hike. Indeed, Patrick Morrow used this argument to defend his choice to adhere to the Messner list, "Being a climber first and a collector second, I felt strongly that Carstensz Pyramid, the highest mountain in Australasia ... was a true mountaineer's objective."

Seven Summits (sorted by elevation)
Photograph	Peak	Bass list	Messner list	Hackett list	Elevation	Prominence	Continent	Mountain Range	Country	First ascent	Coordinates
	Mount Everest	✔	✔	✔	8,849 m (29,032 ft)	8,849 m (29,032 ft)	Asia	Himalayas	China; Nepal	1953	27.9881°N 86.925°E
	Aconcagua	✔	✔	✔	6,961 m (22,838 ft)	6,961 m (22,838 ft)	South America	Andes	Argentina	1897	32.6531°S 70.0117°W
	Denali	✔	✔	✔	6,194 m (20,322 ft)	6,144 m (20,157 ft)	North America	Alaska Range	United States	1913	63.0692°N 151.0064°W
	Kilimanjaro	✔	✔	✔	5,895 m (19,341 ft)	5,885 m (19,308 ft)	Africa	–	Tanzania	1889	3.0667°S 37.3592°E
	Mount Elbrus	✔	✔		5,642 m (18,510 ft)	4,741 m (15,554 ft)	Europe	Caucasus Mountains	Russia	1874	43.35254°N 42.437875°E
	Mount Vinson	✔	✔	✔	4,892 m (16,050 ft)	4,892 m (16,050 ft)	Antarctica	Sentinel Range	–	1966	78.5256°S 85.6172°W
	Puncak Jaya		✔		4,884 m (16,024 ft)	4,884 m (16,024 ft)	Australia	Sudirman Range	Indonesia	1962	4.08°S 137.18°E
	Mont Blanc			✔	4,810 m (15,781 ft)	4,696 m (15,407 ft)	Europe	Alps	France; Italy	1786	45.8328°N 6.865°E
	Mount Kosciuszko	✔		✔	2,228 m (7,310 ft)	2,228 m (7,310 ft)	Australia	Great Dividing Range	Australia	1840	36.4558°S 148.2635°E

Comparison of the heights of the Seven Summits with the eight-thousanders and the Seven Second Summits

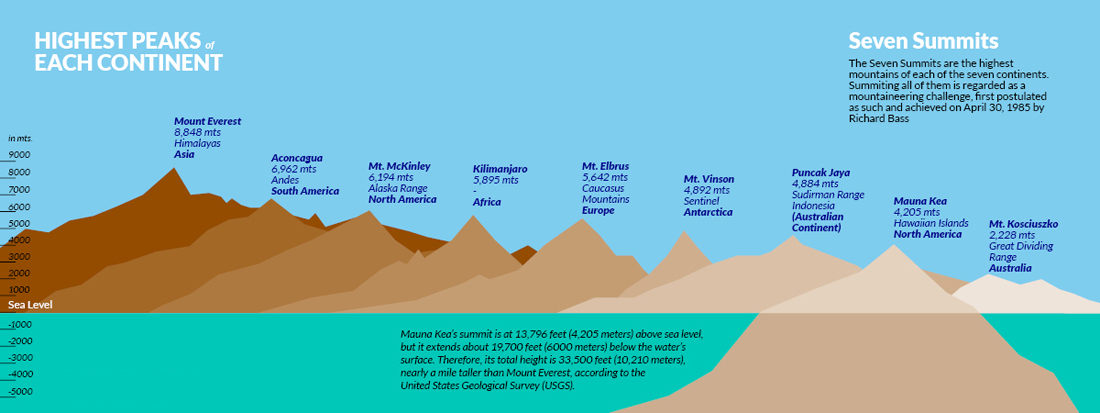
Comparison of the highest peaks of each continents

=== History ===
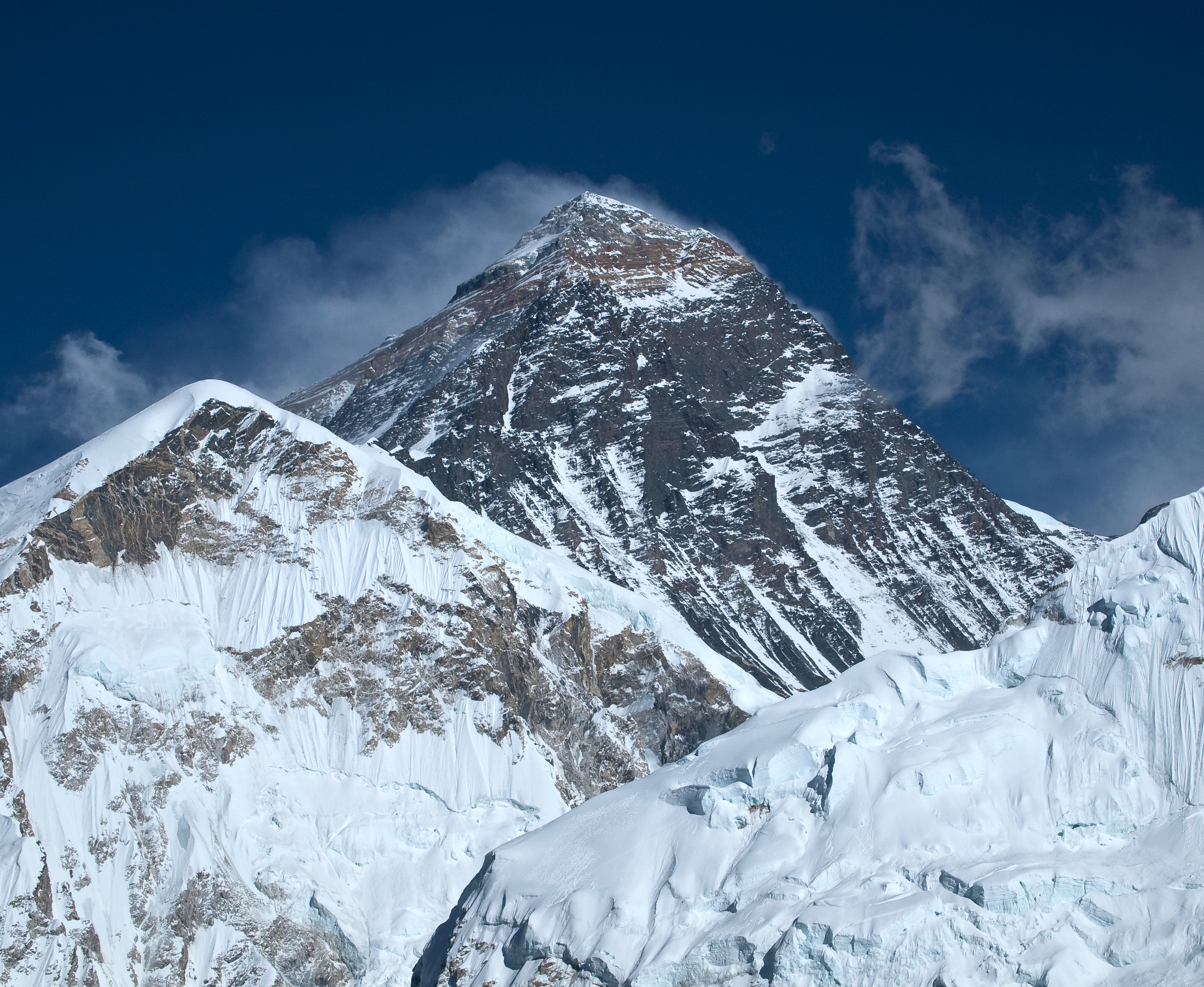
Everest

In 1956, William D. Hackett (1918–1999), an American mountaineer, reached the top of five continents. He climbed Denali (then known as Mount McKinley) (1947), Aconcagua (1949), Kilimanjaro (1950), Kosciuszko (1956) and Mont Blanc (1956). At that time, Mont Blanc was considered to be the highest mountain of the European continent. Hackett made an attempt to climb Mount Vinson and obtained a permit for Mount Everest in 1960, but due to several circumstances (frostbite, lack of funds, etc.), he never made it to more than five summits.

In 1970, the Japanese mountaineer and adventurer Naomi Uemura (1941–1984) was the first person to reach five of the Seven Summits including Mount Everest. He climbed Mont Blanc (1966), Kilimanjaro (1966), Aconcagua (1968), Mount Everest (1970 solo) and Denali (1970 solo). After the first solo trip to the North Pole (1978), he planned to go on his own to Antarctica to climb Mount Vinson. In preparation for the Antarctica expedition, he did a solo winter ascent of Denali (1984). On the descent he disappeared in a winter storm.

In 1978, the Italian mountaineer Reinhold Messner was the first person to reach six of the Seven Summits (1971 Puncak Jaya, 1974 Aconcagua, 1976 Denali (Mount McKinley), 1978 Kilimanjaro, 1978 Mount Everest). For Messner, Carstensz Pyramid (Puncak Jaya) was the highest peak in Australia (Messner list), but in 1983, he climbed Mount Kosciuszko to also satisfy the other geographic definition of Australia. In the same year, Messner climbed Mount Elbrus and declared that it was the true highest peak in Europe. This definition was quickly accepted by others in the mountaineering community. Finally in 1986, he climbed Mount Vinson. At that time, he was only the fifth person to reach the Seven Summits.

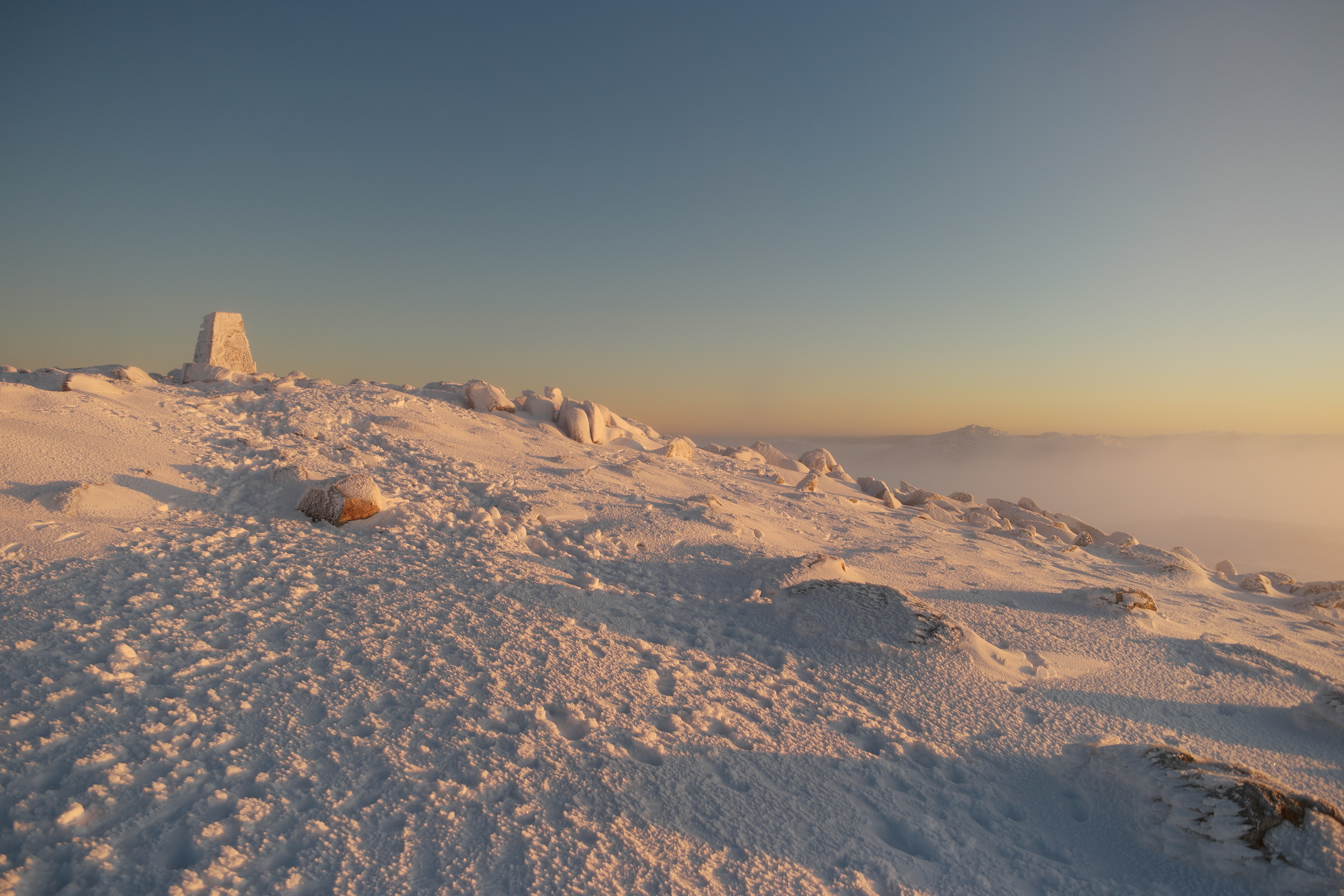
Mount Kosciuszko summit

In 1985, Richard Bass, a businessman and amateur mountaineer, was the first man to climb all Seven Summits. In only one year, 1983, he climbed six peaks: Aconcagua, Denali, Kilimanjaro, Mount Elbrus, Mount Vinson and Mount Kosciuszko. All of these climbs he did together with his companion Frank Wells and different mountain guides. Beginning in 1983, Bass and Wells made various guided attempts to climb Mount Everest, the highest and most difficult peak in the list. On 30 April 1985, Bass reached the summit of Mount Everest in a party without Wells, guided by the American professional mountaineer David Breashears. He then co-authored the book Seven Summits, which covered the undertaking. Later in 1985, American mountaineer Gerry Roach became the second person to climb the Seven Summits.

In 1986, the Canadian mountaineer Patrick Morrow became the first man to climb the Seven Summits in the Carstensz version (Messner list). He climbed Denali (1977), Aconcagua (1981), Mount Everest (1982), Kilimanjaro (1983), Mount Kosciuszko (1983), Mount Vinson (1985), Mount Elbrus (1985) and finally the Puncak Jaya (Carstensz Pyramid) on May 7, 1986. Morrow was also the first to complete both lists (Bass and Messner).

In 1990, Rob Hall and Gary Ball became the first to complete the "Seven Summits" in seven months. Using the Bass list, they started with Everest on 10 May 1990, and finished with Vinson on 12 December 1990, hours before the seven-month deadline.

In 1992, Junko Tabei became the first woman to complete the "Seven Summits". Mary "Dolly" Lefever became the first American woman to climb the "Seven Summits" on March 11, 1993, when she climbed Australia's Mount Kosciuszko. Earlier in 1993, she had become the oldest surviving woman to have reached the summit of Mount Everest; she was 47 years old. In January 1996, Chris Haver became the first American to climb and ski all seven summits. Yasuko Namba was famous in her native Japan for becoming the second Japanese woman to reach all of the Seven Summits including Everest, where she died during the storm of May 1996 during her descent.

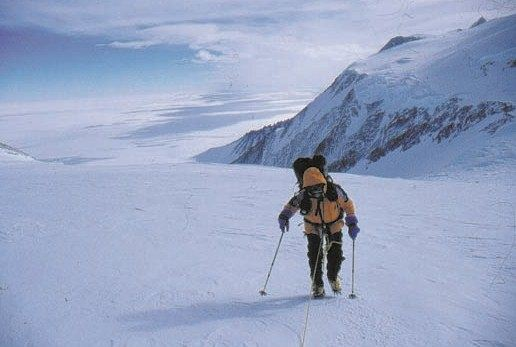
A climber ascending Mount Vinson

In 2000, Croatian mountaineer Stipe Božić completed the Seven Summits, and in 2010 Saško Kedev (who would later complete the 14 Eight-thousanders) became the first Macedonian to complete the Seven Summits (Messner list). In May 2002, Susan Ershler and her husband, Phil, became the first married couple to climb the "Seven Summits" together. The first person to climb the Seven Summits without using supplemental oxygen on Mount Everest is Reinhold Messner. Miroslav Caban is the second climber to finish the project without supplemental oxygen on Everest (finished in 2005 with Carstensz). Ed Viesturs also summited all peaks without supplemental oxygen. Between 2002 and 2007, Austrian climber Christian Stangl completed the Seven Summits (Messner list), climbing alone and without supplemental oxygen, and reported a record total ascent time from respective base camp to summit of 58 hours and 45 minutes.

On 17 May 2006, Rhys Jones became the youngest person to complete the Seven Summits (Bass list) at the age of exactly 20 years. Notable climbers who had previously been the youngest to complete the Seven Summits include Rob Hall in 1990 and David Keaton in 1995. In May 2007, Samantha Larson completed the seven at the age of 18 years and 220 days (she is still the youngest woman to have climbed the Seven Summits). Johnny Strange finished climbing the summits at the age of 17 years and 161 days in June 2009. On 26 May 2011, at 6:45 Nepali time, Geordie Stewart became the youngest Briton to complete the Seven Summits at the age of 22 years and 21 days. In 2009–10, Indian mountaineer Krushnaa Patil made a bid for the fastest woman to complete the challenge; she fell short of the challenge when, in May 2009, her seventh and final summit bid on Denali was halted by her guide's illness. George Atkinson then became the youngest person in the world to complete the round aged 16 years 362 days. On 24 December 2011, the record was once again beaten, by American Jordan Romero, who completed the challenge at the age of 15 years, 5 months and 12 days by climbing Vinson.

In October 2006, Kit Deslauriers became the first person to have skied down (parts of) all seven peaks (Bass list). Three months later, in January 2007, Swedes Olof Sundström and Martin Letzter completed their Seven Summits skiing project by skiing down (parts of) Carstensz Pyramid, thus becoming the first and only people to have skied both lists.

Indian mountaineer Malli Mastan Babu also had the eminence of setting a Guinness world record by surmounting the Seven Summits in 172 days in 2006. The world record for completion of the Messner and Bass list was 136 days, by Danish climber Henrik Kristiansen in 2008. Kristiansen completed the summits in the following order: Vinson on Jan 21, Aconcagua on Feb 6, Kosciuszko on Feb 13, Kilimanjaro on Mar 1, Carstensz Pyramid on Mar 14, Elbrus on May 8, Everest on May 25, spending just 22 days on the mountain (normally, expeditions take up to two months acclimatizing, laying ropes, etc.) and finally Denali on June 5, beating Ian McKeever's previous record by 20 days. Vern Tejas set the new record for the same, in 134 days. Tejas began with summiting Vinson on 18 January 2010 and ended with summiting Denali on May 31. This was Tejas' ninth time to complete the Bass Seven Summits.

In January 2010, the Spanish climber Carlos Soria Fontán, at the age of 71, completed the seven summits (Messner list) after reaching the summit of Kilimanjaro. He climbed the first one in 1968. On 23 May 2010, AC Sherpa summited Mount Everest as his last and final conquest of the Seven Summits (Bass list). In doing this, he set a new record by climbing the Seven Summits within 42 climbing days. Additionally, when climbing Mount Kilimanjaro (via Marangu) he summited in just 16 hours and 37 minutes, easily beating the previous record of 18 hours.

On 24 December 2011, it was reported that only 118 people had climbed the Seven Summits if one assumes "full" completion of the quest requires climbing the "Eight Summits" across both the Bass and Messner lists (climbing both Carstensz Pyramid and Kosciusko in addition to the other six "undisputed" summits such as Everest). 231 persons have climbed the Messner list, while 234 have completed the Bass list. 348 have done either the Bass or Messner list.

In 2013, Vanessa O'Brien became the fastest female to complete the Seven Summits (including Carstensz Pyramid), finishing in 10 months. Cason Crane became the first openly gay man to climb the Seven Summits.

On 21 November 2013, Werner Berger (Canada, ex-South African), at the age of 76 years and 129 days, became the oldest person in the world to complete the Seven Summits (Bass plus Messner 7) after a 6-day jungle trek to Carstensz Pyramid. It took him 3 attempts, due to weather, to reach the sumit of Denali. On the first attempt his team got within 200' of the summit and had to turn back.

In 2013, Cheryl and Nikki Bart became the first mother-daughter team to complete the Seven Summits.

On 16 December 2014, Tashi and Nungshi Malik became the world's first twins and siblings to complete the Seven Summits (Messner list). Colin O'Brady broke the record for the Messner and Bass lists in 131 days, summiting Vinson on 17 January 2016 and completing with Denali on 27 May 2016.

The youngest person to complete both the Seven Summits and the Volcanic Seven Summits is Satyarup Siddhanta from India. He completed the feat on 15 Jan 2019 after summiting Mt Sidley, Antarctica at the age of 35 years 261 days breaking the record of Daniel Bull from Australia. He was also the first Indian to accomplish the feat and created a Guinness world record.

On 6 January 2018, Chris Bombardier reached the summit of Mount Vinson, becoming the first person with hemophilia to complete the Seven Summits (Messner list). On 23 June 2018, Silvia Vasquez-Lavado reached the summit of Denali, becoming the first openly gay woman to complete the Seven Summits (including Carstensz Pyramid). On 4 January 2019, Arunima Sinha reached the summit of Mount Vinson, becoming the first female amputee to complete the Seven Summits (including Carstensz Pyramid).

=== Criticism ===
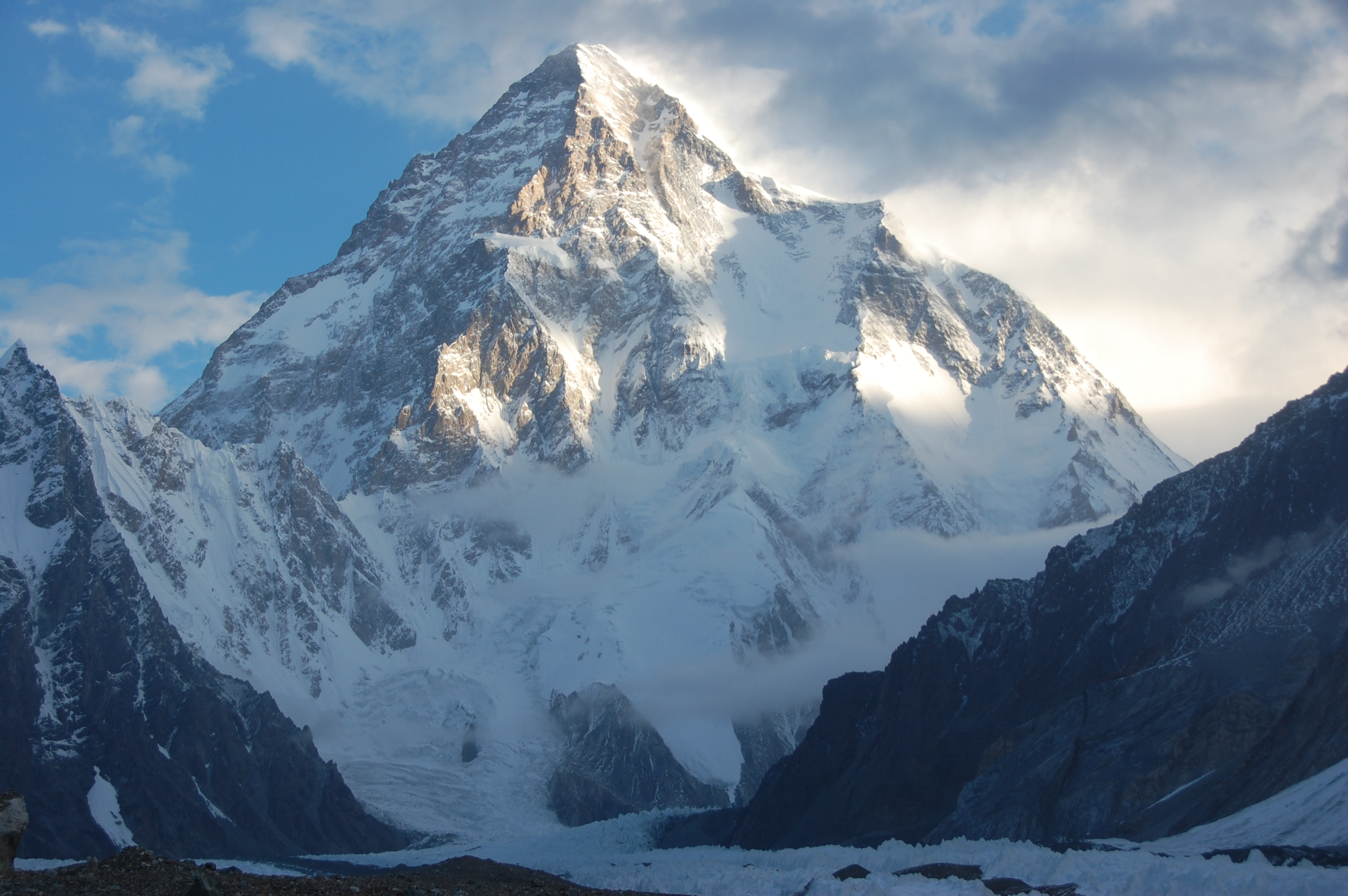
K2, about 800 feet (240 m) shorter than Everest

Alpinism author Jon Krakauer (1997) wrote in Into Thin Air that it would be a bigger challenge to climb the second-highest peak of each continent, known as the Seven Second Summits – a feat that was not accomplished until January 2013. This discussion had previously been published in an article titled The Second Seven Summits in Rock & Ice Magazine (#77) authored by the mountaineer and Seven Summits completer David Keaton. This is especially true for Asia, as K2 (8,611 m) demands greater technical climbing skills than Everest (8,848 m), while altitude-related factors such as the thinness of the atmosphere, high winds and low temperatures remain much the same. Some of those completing the seven ascents are aware of the magnitude of the challenge. In 2000, in a foreword to Steve Bell et al., Seven Summits, Morrow opined "[t]he only reason Reinhold [Messner] wasn't the first person to complete the seven was that he was too busy gambolling up the 14 tallest mountains in the world." In January 2023, a writer for Climbing said "Today, the Seven Summits are a relatively common – almost cliché – tour of each continent's highest peak", and that the real challenge was the Explorer's Grand Slam, the Seven Summits with the North and South poles.

=== Defence ===
Bill Allen, who completed the Seven Summits twice, said that getting to the summit never gets old. The 8000ers are all in East Asia; Nepal, China, India and Pakistan in a more narrow region of Earth, and many of the climbs are quite dangerous with several climbers dying short of completing all 14. Another problem is that while there are 14 main summits, there are additional sub-peaks over 8000 m. Indeed, in 2013, authorities were considering officially recognizing some additional peaks as 8000ers.

== Second and third lists ==
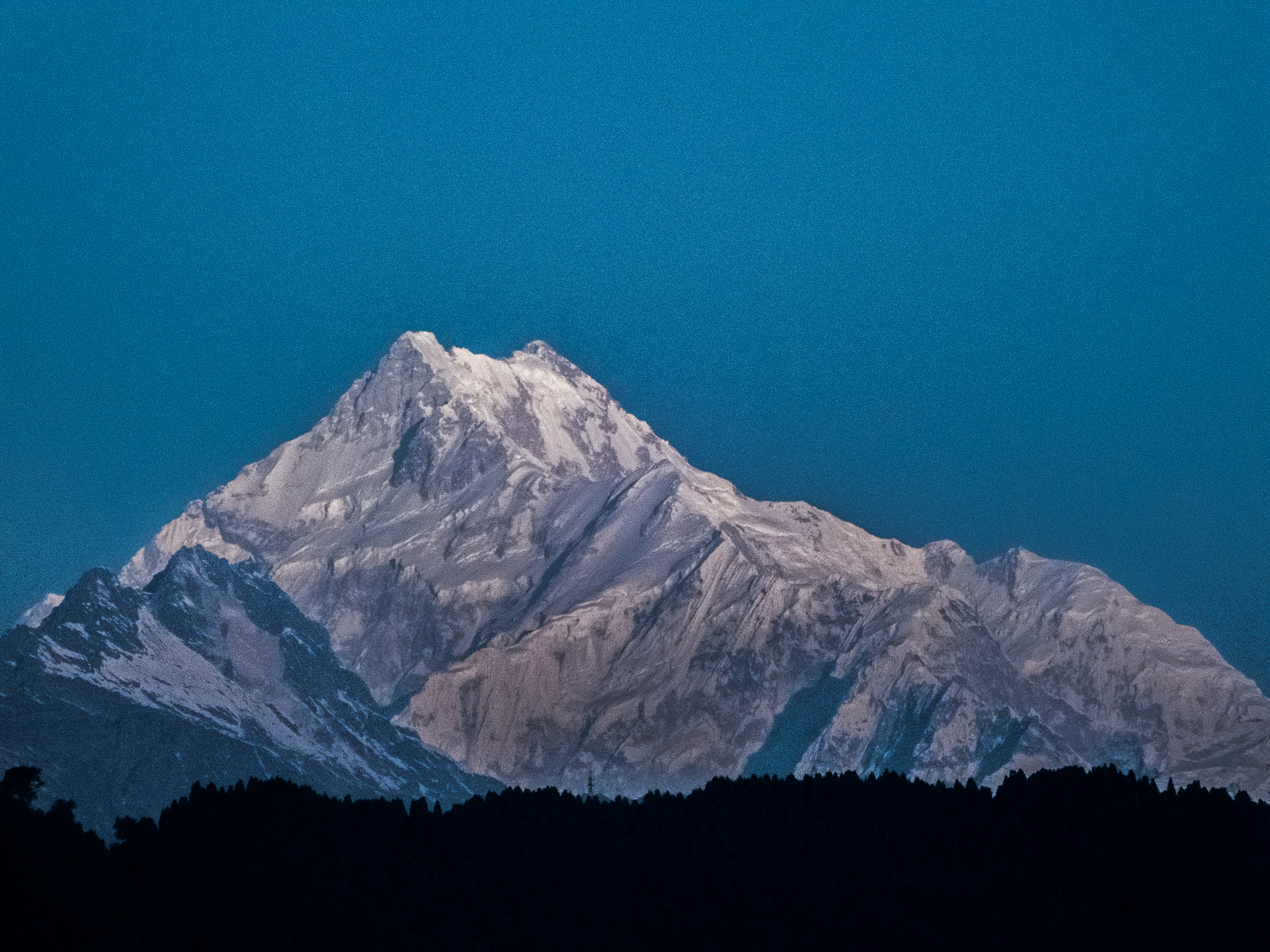
Kanchenjunga is the world's third-highest mountain; it tops out less than 100 feet (30 m) shorter than K2.

The Seven Second Summits collection is considered to be a more difficult mountaineering challenge than the standard Seven Summits, even if the peaks are lower. Like the number one list, the number two and three lists are subject to the Bass vs. Messner geophysical/political dichotomy.

Number twos

- Asia: K2
- South America: Ojos del Salado ("Eyes of Salt")
- North America: Mount Logan
- Europe: Dykh-Tau ("Jagged Mount")
- Africa: Mount Kenya
- Antarctica: Mount Tyree
- Oceania: Puncak Mandala (formerly "Juliana Peak") or Mount Townsend

A Seven Second Summits collection was first achieved in January 2013 by Christian Stangl.

== See also ==
- Oceans Seven, marathon swimming challenge
- Eight-thousander, the 14 highest mountains on Earth
- Explorer's Grand Slam, also known as the Adventurers Grand Slam
- Seven Second Summits
- Seven Third Summits
- Three Poles Challenge
- Volcanic Seven Summits
