= Trimountain (disambiguation) =

Trimountain is a traprock mountain in Connecticut, United States.

Trimountain or Tri-Mountain may also refer to:

- Tri-Mountain State Park, the state park that encompasses Trimountain in Connecticut
- Trimountain, Michigan, a census-designated place in the United States
- Tri-Mountain National Scenic Area, a national scenic area in central Taiwan

== See also ==
- Three Peaks (disambiguation)
- Tri Peaks (disambiguation)
- Trio Mountain
