= Rhys Jones (mountaineer) =

English mountaineer

Rhys Jones (born 17 May 1986) is an English mountaineer and was the youngest person to climb the Seven Summits (the highest mountain on each of the World's seven continents), and reached the summit of Mount Everest.

Completing the climb on his 20th birthday in 2006, Rhys beat the previous world record set by Danielle Fisher and the previous British record set by Jake Meyer one year earlier. However, this record was later broken on 24 December 2011, by Jordan Romero. Rhys is the social secretary of the Kirkby Stephen Mountain Rescue Team.

== Early life ==
Rhys grew up in the New Forest, Hampshire, England, and was educated at Romsey School and Barton Peveril Sixth Form College. He started climbing as a result of hearing a talk at a Scout meeting. The talk was by Russell Parke MBE, the then leader of Hampshire Scout Expeditions; the subject was Mount Everest. Parkes talked about recruiting a Scout for an attempt on Mount Everest in 2007, to celebrate the centenary of the Scout movement. Jones went on to join the Hampshire Scout Expeditions team (HSX) and began training. His training with HSX included Scottish winter climbing, rock climbing, and hillwalking. He also climbed with HSX on Mount McKinley, Alaska. The team successfully reached the summit, and Jones claimed a record as the youngest British summiteer of North America's highest peak.

== Expeditions ==
Mount McKinley was his first of the seven continental summits, and Jones then climbed the other six over a 3-year period.

Mount McKinley, Alaska. N. America. June Summit 2003 Aconcagua, Argentina. S. America. Attempt Dec 2003 Kilimanjaro, Tanzania. Africa. Summit Jan 2004 Aconcagua, Argentina. S. America. Summit Jan 2005 Mount Elbrus, Russia. Europe. Summit, July 2005 Kosciusko, Australia. Australasia. Summit Nov 2005 Mount Vinson, Antarctica. Summit Dec 2005 Mount Everest, Nepal. Asia. Summit May 2006

The Everest climb was in aid of the Wessex Heartbeat charity, and Jones pledged to raise £1 for every vertical foot of Everest, £29,035 in total.

== After Everest ==
In August 2006, Jones raced in the Round Britain and Ireland non-stop yacht race, covering 2000 nm and completing a race in which one third of the fleet were forced to retire due to bad weather. After the race, he was appointed as a Patron of the Sail 4 Cancer Charity.

In 2007, Jones undertook a pioneering expedition to a remote part of South East Greenland. Sailing to Greenland from Iceland, the 3 man team then trekked inland across a glacier, where Jones fell into a crevasse fracturing his arm. During the 3 weeks waiting for the yacht to return, the team successfully made the first ascents of four previously unclimbed peaks.

In 2010 Jones set up a specialist trekking and expedition company, RJ7 Expeditions. In 2011, RJ7 facilitated a filmed climb of Kilimanjaro for the BBC documentary "Albino Witchcraft Murders", charting the plight of Tanzanians living with albinism. The lead character from the film, 34-year-old Tanzanian albino Josephat Torner reached the summit after 7 days of trekking.

In 2012 RJ7 was responsible for leading Duncan Bannatyne (star of BBC Dragon's Den) on Kilimanjaro. RJ7 organised a successful climb for 4 amputee servicemen in February 2012, and two members of the team (both single amputees) set a new Guinness World Record for the Fastest Ascent of Kilimanjaro using crutches.

An avid skier as well as a mountaineer, Rhys became a Patron of Sail 4 Cancer's sister charity, Ski 4 Cancer, in 2012.

In 2014 Jones undertook a self-supported ski mountaineering expedition with his wife, Laura. They made a successful ascent of Gunnbjorn Fjeld, the highest mountain in the Arctic.

Currently, Rhys and Laura run Monix Adventures, a luxury adventure travel company.

Laura has herself now run 7 marathons around the world in 1 year as part of her ICanRun7 challenge, including the world's highest marathon on Mt Everest and the world's coldest marathon in the Yukon.

Both keep an active profile on the speaking circuit for inspirational talks, after-dinner speeches, and event presenting.
