= Ian McKeever (mountaineer) =

Irish mountaineer (1970–2013)

- Born: 13 February 1970; Ireland
- Died: 2 January 2013 (aged 42); Mount Kilimanjaro, Tanzania
- Cause of death: lightning strike

Ian McKeever (13 February 1970 – 2 January 2013) was an Irish mountaineer and motivational speaker. He once held the world record for the fastest completion of the Seven Summits challenge, completing the Messner and Bass lists in a record 156 days. He was killed by a lightning strike on Kilimanjaro.

== Career ==
McKeever studied social sciences at University College Dublin (UCD). He was a traffic announcer on AA Roadwatch in Ireland for many years before becoming a mountaineer. He also worked in public relations. In his later years McKeever founded the Kilimanjaro Achievers Organisation, and through this led many expeditions to Mount Kilimanjaro for Irish secondary school students. He led an average of around 10 climbs per year, and maintained a 100% success rate regarding his groups reaching the summit.

=== Achievements ===
In 2004, McKeever set the Five Peaks Challenge world record, climbing and descending all five peaks in 16 hours 16 minutes. He climbed 26 peaks of the island of Ireland in 98 hours in 2006.

McKeever broke the world record for the Seven Summits Challenge in 2007, climbing the highest summit on each of the seven continents in 155 days, 32 less than the previous record. In 2008, he helped his 10-year-old godson Sean McSharry become the youngest person in Europe to reach the top of Kilimanjaro. McKeever was part of a team that attempted to row the South Atlantic Ocean in under 30 days in 2009. Members of this crew included Leven Brown, Livar Nysted, and Breffny Morgan. After 11 days at sea, and 1003 miles covered, the boat lost its rudder and they were forced to postpone the attempt.

When McKeever turned 40 in 2009, he set himself the challenge of beating Eamonn Coghlan's four-minute mile for a person over 40. His mile dropped from 7 minutes to 4 minutes 20 seconds in 22 months of training. McKeever set a new record for the most climbs of Croagh Patrick in 2011, when he made 35 summits in 80 climbing hours.

== Death ==
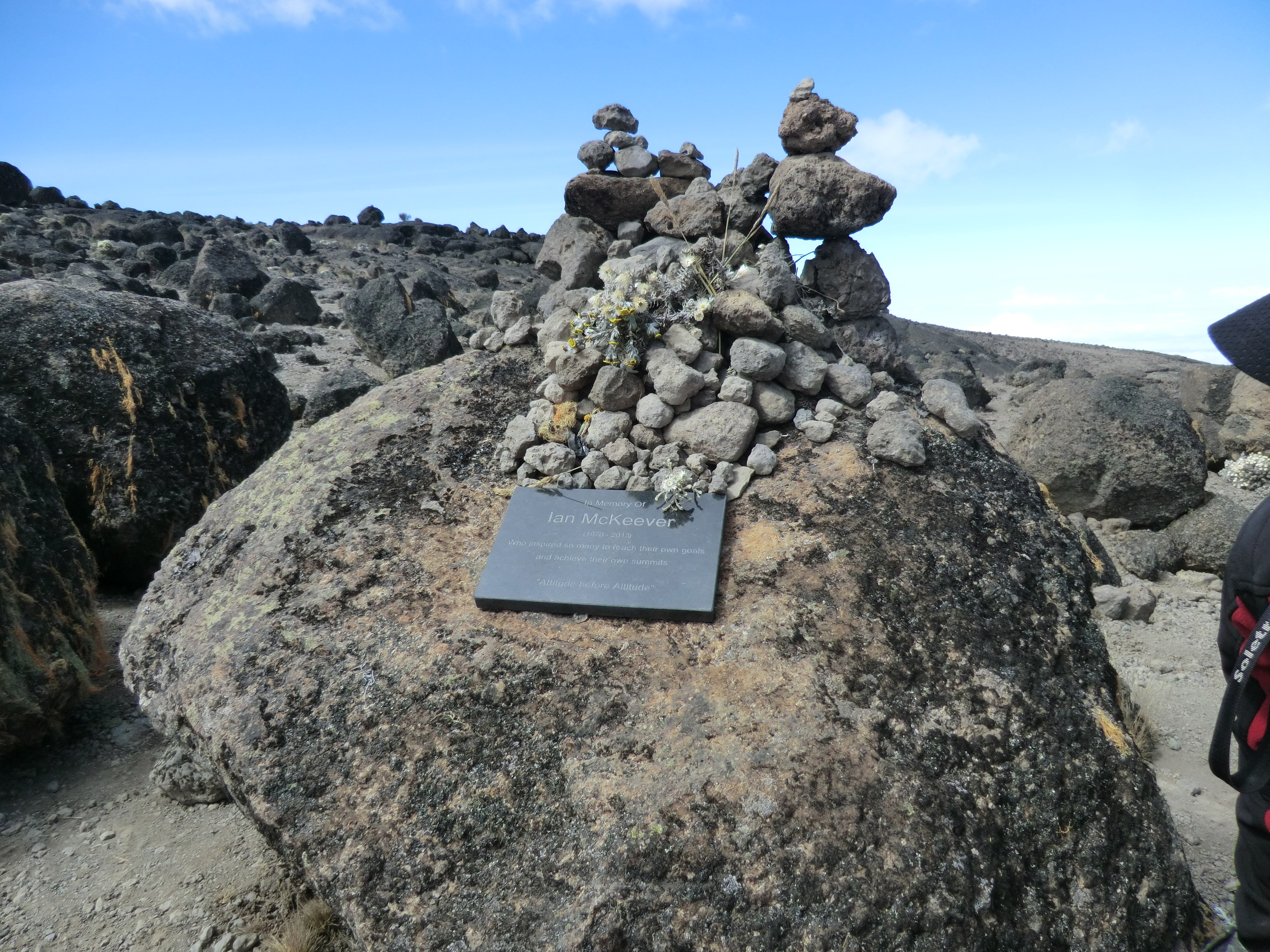
Commemorating plaque for Ian McKeever on Mount Kilimanjaro

On 2 January 2013 McKeever was struck by lightning and died while climbing Kilimanjaro. He was on the third day of the climb and had experienced torrential rain for the duration. The group was due to pass the mountain's famous Lava Tower on that day. During the lightning strike his fiancée was injured, although not seriously.

McKeever's family confirmed his death with a late night Facebook posting. Climbing experts described the nature of his death as extremely rare. McKeever updated his website regularly during his final expedition, with his last posting, stating:

Torrential rain all day. Spirits remain good even if drying clothes is proving impossible. We pray for dryer weather tomorrow – the big day.

== Publications ==
- Give Me Shelter (2007), Folens Publishers (Ireland) ISBN 1847411886
- Give Me Irish Heroes (2009), Ian McKeever ISBN 0956404200
- Give Me 28 Days, unfinished due to death
