= National Three Peaks Challenge =

Hiking event

Location of the three peaks within the United Kingdom

The National Three Peaks Challenge is an event in which participants attempt to climb the highest mountains of England, Scotland and Wales within 24 hours. It is frequently used to raise money for charitable organisations. Walkers climb each peak in turn, and are driven from the foot of one mountain to the next. The three peaks are:

- Ben Nevis / Beinn Nibheis (1,345 m or 4,413 ft), the highest mountain in Scotland
- Scafell Pike (978 m or 3,209 ft), the highest mountain in England
- Snowdon / Yr Wyddfa (1,085 m or 3,560 ft), the highest mountain in Wales

The total distance walked is estimated at 42 kilometres (26 mi) or 44 km (27 mi), with a total ascent of 9,800 feet (3,000 m).

== Ben Nevis ==
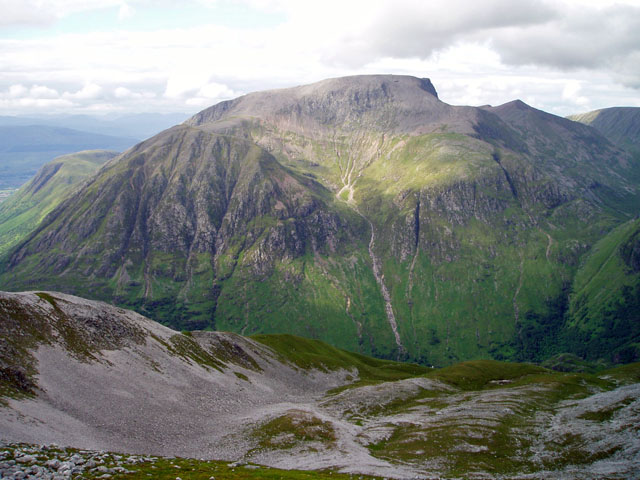
Ben Nevis from Sgùrr a' Mhàim

Ben Nevis (Scottish Gaelic: Beinn Nibheis) is the highest mountain in the British Isles. It is located at the western end of the Grampian Mountains in the Lochaber area of the Scottish Highlands, close to the town of Fort William. It attracts an estimated 100,000 ascents a year, around three-quarters of which are made using the Pony Track from Glen Nevis on the south side of the mountain. For climbers and mountaineers the main attraction lies in the 700 m (2,300 ft) high cliffs of the north face; among the highest cliffs in the United Kingdom, they harbour some classic scrambles and rock climbs of all difficulties, and are one of the principal locations in the UK for ice climbing.

The summit, at 1,345 m (4,413 ft) above sea level, features the ruins of an observatory, which was continuously staffed between 1883 and 1904. The meteorological data collected during this period is still important for understanding Scottish mountain weather. Charles Thomson Rees Wilson was inspired to invent the cloud chamber after a period spent working at the observatory, for which he was joint winner of the Nobel Prize in Physics in 1927.

== Scafell Pike ==
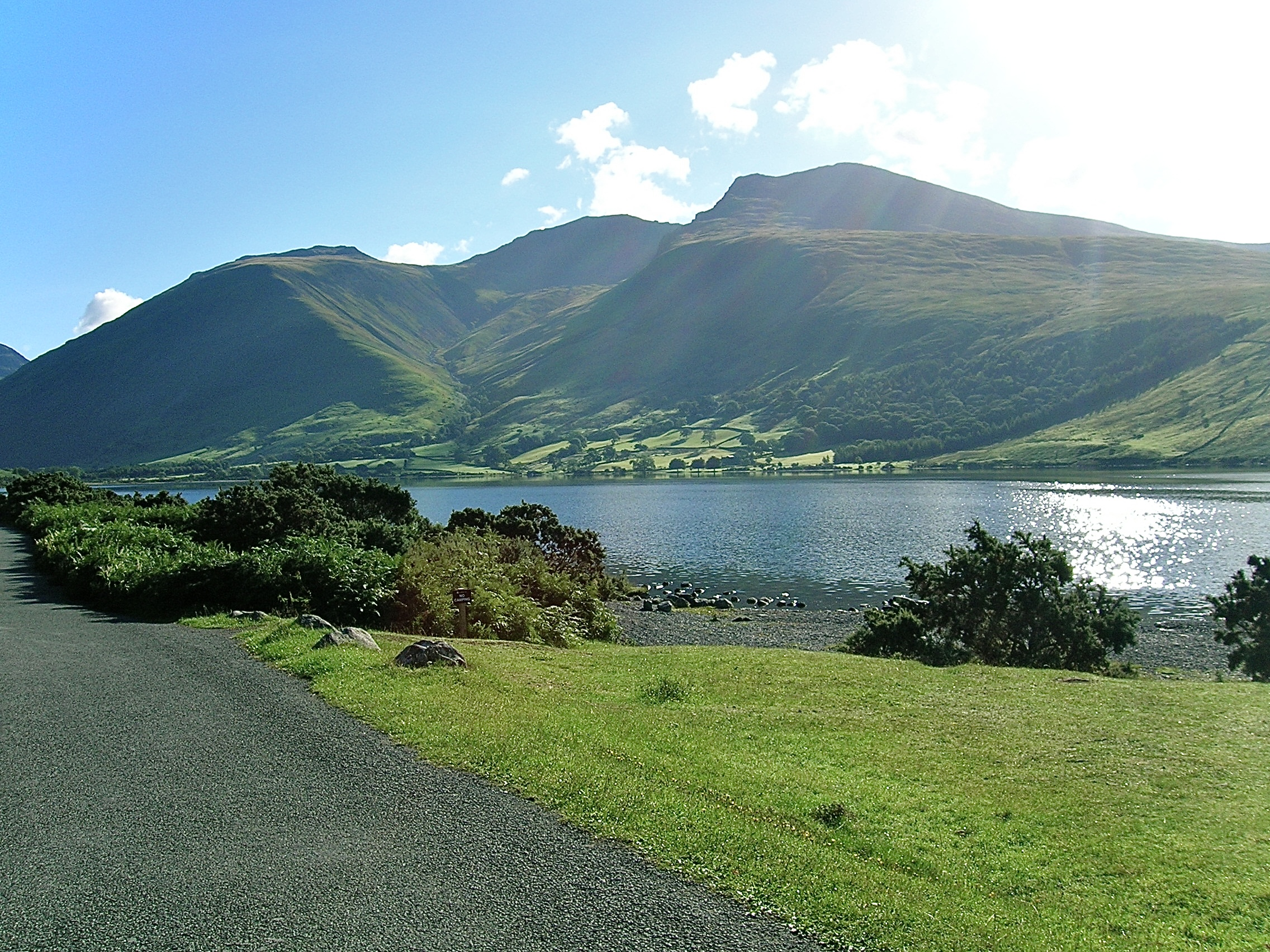
Scafell Pike seen over Wast Water

Scafell Pike is the highest mountain in England at 978 m (3,209 ft). It is located in Lake District National Park, in Cumbria.

Scafell Pike consists of igneous rock dating from the Ordovician geologically part of the Borrowdale Volcanics. The summit plateau of Scafell Pike, and that of other neighbouring peaks, is covered with shattered rock debris which provides the highest altitude example of a summit boulder field in England. The boulder field is thought to have been caused in part by weathering, such as frost action. Additional factors are also considered to be important, however opinion varies as to what these may be. Clifton Ward suggested that weathering with earthquakes as a secondary agent could be responsible, while J. E. Marr and R. A. Daly believed that earthquakes were unnecessary and suggested that frost action with other unspecified agents was more likely. To the north of the summit are a number of high altitude ghylls or ravines, containing streams which flow into Lingmell Beck. These are good examples in Cumbria for this type of stream, and are also biologically important due to their species richness.

== Snowdon ==
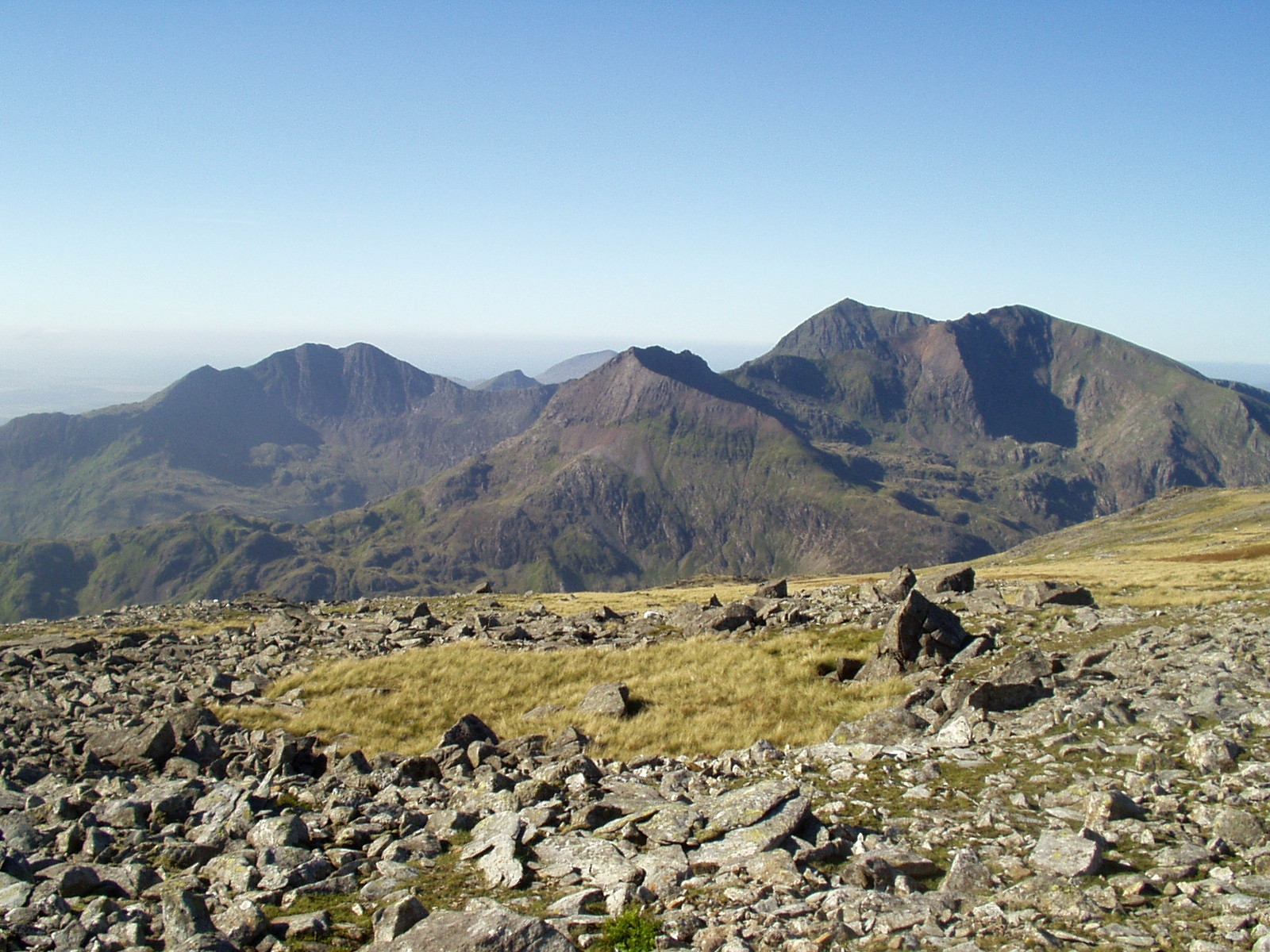
Snowdon from Glyder Fawr

Snowdon (Welsh: Yr Wyddfa) is the highest mountain in Wales, at an altitude of 1,085 m (3,560 ft) above sea level, and the highest point in the British Isles outside Scotland. It is located in Snowdonia National Park (Parc Cenedlaethol Eryri) in Gwynedd, and has been described as "probably the busiest mountain in Britain". It is designated as a national nature reserve for its rare flora and fauna.

The rocks that form Snowdon were produced by volcanoes in the Ordovician period, and the massif has been extensively sculpted by glaciation, forming the pyramidal peak of Snowdon and the arêtes of Crib Goch and Y Lliwedd. The cliff faces on Snowdon, including Clogwyn Du'r Arddu, are significant for rock climbing, and the mountain was used by Edmund Hillary in training for the 1953 ascent of Mount Everest.

Snowdon affords some of the best views in Britain, and the summit can be reached by a number of well-known paths. The summit can also be reached on the Snowdon Mountain Railway, a rack and pinion railway opened in 1896 which carries passengers the 4.7 mi (7.6 km) from Llanberis to the summit station. The summit also houses a visitor centre called Hafod Eryri, opened in 2009 to replace one built in the 1930s.

The name Snowdon is from the Old English for "snow hill", while the Welsh name – Yr Wyddfa – means "the tumulus", which may refer to the cairn thrown over the legendary giant Rhitta Gawr after his defeat by King Arthur. As well as other figures from Arthurian legend, the mountain is linked to a legendary afanc (water monster) and the Tylwyth Teg (fairies).

== Logistics ==
Ronald Turnbull argues that it makes sense to tackle the summits from north to south, starting at Ben Nevis in the evening, and ending at Snowdon the following day. This is because the descent of Ben Nevis is the easiest of the three to do in fading light, particularly the lower section below Lochan Meall an t-Suidhe ("Half-Way Lochan"), and because the night can be used for driving down the A74(M) and M74 motorways to Scafell Pike. This then entails climbing Scafell Pike early the following morning and driving to Snowdonia for the early afternoon, in order to climb Snowdon and descend again by the evening. Scafell Pike can be climbed either from the north side starting at Seathwaite (Borrowdale) or from the south side, starting at Wasdale Head. The Wasdale approach is a longer drive but provides a shorter walk. Snowdon is climbed from Pen-y-Pass, although an alternative descent leads to Llanberis, and takes an additional 15 minutes.

Each mountain is expected to take up to 5 hours to climb and descend for a "standard strong walker", and a total driving time of 10 hours allows an average speed of 65 miles per hour (105 km/h) on motorways and 50–55 mph (80–89 km/h) on trunk roads and occasional comfort breaks and fuel stops.

Variations of the basic format have also been achieved, such as replacing the driving sections with the use of public transport, or sailing between the three peaks across the Irish Sea.

== Environmental impact ==
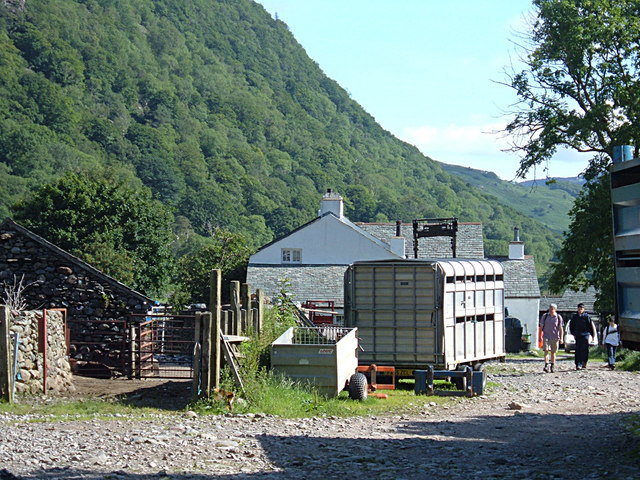
Small rural communities such as Seathwaite in the Lake District bear the greatest impact from the National Three Peaks Challenge.

There is some controversy about the environmental impact of the Three Peaks Challenge. In an editorial in the British Mountaineering Council's Summit magazine, Jill Hudson argues that the Three Peaks Challenge should be shunned as it costs charities more to clean up after participants than they raise by taking part. In 2011, Wanderlust magazine placed the challenge on a list of destinations in need of greater care, and that the numbers of participants should be limited. Organisers disagree, arguing that the 30,000 participants in the Three Peaks Challenge is small compared to the 250,000 who climb Snowdon annually. Since March 2010, the Fundraising Standards Board has acted as a centralised hub for complaints from the National Parks about groups engaged in the National Three Peaks Challenge.

== See also ==
- Three Peaks yacht race
- Yorkshire Three Peaks
- Five Peaks Challenge
- Snaefell, the highest mountain on the Isle of Man
- Slieve Donard, the highest mountain in Northern Ireland
- Carrauntoohil, the highest mountain in the Republic of Ireland
