= Patrick Morrow =

Canadian photographer and mountain climber (born 1952)

Patrick Allan Morrow
- Born: October 18, 1952 (age 73); Invermere, British Columbia, Canada
- Known for: Summiter of the Seven Summits

Patrick Allan Morrow, CM (born October 18, 1952) is a Canadian photographer and mountain climber. In 1986 he was the first person to climb the Seven Summits in the Carstensz-Version.

== Biography ==
Morrow climbed Mount Everest, the highest peak of the world, with the "Canadian Mount Everest Expedition 1982". Between 1977 and 1986, he climbed the Seven Summits in the more difficult Carstensz-Version ("Messner list"). He wrote a book about this process, Beyond Everest: Quest for the Seven Summits, in which he argued the veracity of the Carstensz-Version over the Bass List.

Born in Invermere, British Columbia, Morrow was the first person to summit all the seven peaks on the Messner List of Seven Summits while Richard Bass was the first to complete the Bass List. Morrow was the first person to climb all the eight peaks on both lists (Bass and Messner).

Morrow has other high-altitude mountaineering achievements, and in 1987, he was made a Member of the Order of Canada. Professionally, Morrow was a still photographer until about 2001 when he transitioned to video.

== Climbs of the Seven Summits ==
- Denali, North America [1977]
- Aconcagua, South America [1981]
- Mount Everest, Asia [1982]
- Elbrus, Europe [1983]
- Mount Kilimanjaro, Africa [1983]
- Mount Kosciuszko, Australia [1983] (Bass list)
- Vinson Massif, Antarctica [1985]
- Puncak Jaya (Carstensz Pyramid), Oceania [1986] (Messner list)

== Writings ==
- Morrow, Patrick (1986). Beyond Everest: Quest For the Seven Summits. Camden House, 175 pp., 125 colour photos, soft cover, ISBN 0-920656-46-3.
