= Five Peaks Challenge =

Hill walking challenge in the British Isles

The 5 Peaks Challenge is a hill climbing challenge in which the aim is to ascend and descend the highest peak in each of England, Northern Ireland, Scotland and Wales (of the United Kingdom) and the Republic of Ireland within 48 hours, including all travelling, and without breaking national speed limits or recommended driving times. It is an extension of the National Three Peak Challenge, which includes the highest peaks in England, Scotland and Wales.

== Peaks ==
The five peaks are:

- Scafell Pike 978 m (3,208.66 ft), in England
- Slieve Donard 849 m (2,785.43 ft), in Northern Ireland
- Carrauntoohil 1,038 m (3,405.51 ft), in the Republic of Ireland
- Ben Nevis 1,345 m (4,412.73 ft), in Scotland
- Snowdon 1,085 m (3,559.71 ft), in Wales

== Record ==
Ian McKeever along with Niall Kavanagh, Cathal Cregg and Lorcan Sweetnan set the world record in the Five Peaks Challenge, on 25 June 2004 climbing and descending all five peaks in 16 hours 16 minutes
