= Three Peaks Yacht Race =

The Three Peaks Yacht Race is held each year in June in the United Kingdom since 1977. It is based on an idea of Bill Tilman, who had advocated a Three Peaks Challenge route without using motorised transport. His doctor, Rob Haworth, with colleague Merfyn Jones developed the idea into a race.

Yachts with five crews, comprising sailors and runners, sail from Barmouth on the West Wales coast to Caernarfon in the Menai Strait, where the runners disembark and run to the top of Snowdon and back. They then sail across Liverpool Bay to Whitehaven on the coast of north-west England, where the runners cycle to Ennerdale and run over to Wasdale and up Scafell Pike and back. Finally they sail round the Mulls of Galloway and Kintyre up Loch Linnhe to Fort William in Scotland where the runners scale Ben Nevis and return to the yacht.

The first yacht to complete the race wins the trophy. Achieving a good enough start to gain the help of the Menai Strait tidal current after the Snowdon run can save several hours.

In 2005, ten teams completed the race with times ranging from three days eighteen hours to five days eight hours.
