= Adam Bielecki =

Polish mountainier (born 1983)

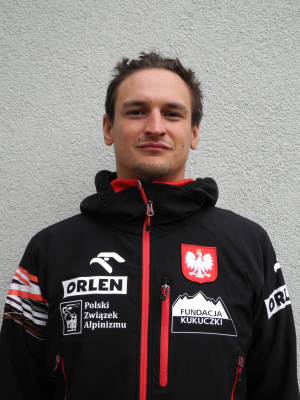
- Adam Bielecki (2011)
- Born: 12 May 1983 (age 43); Tychy, Poland
- Education: Jagiellonian University
- Occupation: Mountaineer
- Known for: First winter ascents of Gasherbrum I and Broad Peak

Adam Radosław Bielecki (born 12 May 1983) is a Polish alpine and high-altitude climber, known for the first winter ascents of the eight-thousanders: Gasherbrum I and Broad Peak. In his book Spod zamarzniętych powiek, written with co-author Dominik Szczepański, Bielecki tells the story of his climbings, memories from Himalayan expeditions, and the effort the highest mountains demand.

== Early life and education ==
Adam Bielecki was born in 1983 in Tychy, Poland. He graduated from the Leon Kruczkowski High School No. 1 in Tychy. He studied psychology at the Jagiellonian University in Kraków. At the age of 17, he was the youngest person to climb Khan Tengri in alpine-style.

== Career ==
Bielecki climbs in the sport style, without oxygen support from the bottle.

=== Eight-thousanders ===
On September 30, 2011, together with Artur Hajzer and Tomasz Wolfart, Bielecki summited Makalu (8463m), They climbed the mountain without supplemental oxygen.

On March 9, 2012, Bielecki and Janusz Gołąb made the first winter ascent of Gasherbrum I (8080m), thereby also achieving the highest elevation reached by man in winter in the Karakorum. They climbed the mountain without supplemental oxygen.

On July 31, 2012, Bielecki summited K2 (8611m) without use of supplemental oxygen.

On March 5, 2013, Bielecki climbed Broad Peak (8051m) together with Maciej Berbeka, Artur Małek, and Tomasz Kowalski. They climbed the mountain without supplementary oxygen. The climbers separated before the summit, and while Bielecki and Małek reached the camp on descent, Berbeka and Kowalski went missing and were pronounced dead three days later.

On January 27, 2018, Bielecki, along with Denis Urubko, Jarosław Botor, and Piotr Tomala, led a rescue operation on Nanga Parbat to save climbers Élisabeth Revol and Tomasz Mackiewicz, who were stuck on the mountain. All four of them had been attempting a winter summit of K2, were brought to the mountain by helicopter. Bielecki and Urubko climbed over 1000m through the night to reach Revol. They succeeded in bringing Revol to safety, but, due to the severe weather conditions, were unable to save Mackiewicz. The K2 expedition ended with no success. Bielecki and his colleagues were awarded Legion of Honour, France's highest distinction for military and civil merits, for this rescue mission.

On July 16, 2018, Adam Bielecki with Felix Berg, climbed Gasherbrum II by the west face without supplementary oxygen.

On April 20, 2023, Adam Bielecki, along with his partner Mariusz Hatala, and a team of Sherpas (including Tashi Sherpa, Lakpa Nurbu Sherpa, Chhepal Sherpa, and Dawa Nurbu Sherpa), led by Chhang Dawa Sherpa of Seven Summit Treks, executed the successful rescue of mountain climber Anurag Maloo. Maloo had fallen approximately 70 meters into a deep ice crevasse while attempting to descend Anapurna I on April 17, 2023.

=== Other Mountains ===
Bielecki was a leader of multiple expeditions on five continents. Among other peaks, he also climbed: Tilicho Peak, Pik Lenin, Jengish Chokusu (western summit), Damavand, Ararat, Kilimanjaro, Ruwenzori, Mount Kenya, Chimborazo, Cotopaxi, Aconcagua, Denali, Dhampus Peak, El Cuerno, Artesonraju, and Churup. In the Alps, he climbed a total of 17 four-thousanders, including Mont Blanc, Dufourspitze, and Matterhorn.

On August 20, 2017, Bielecki, together with Paweł Migas and Jacek Czech, climbed in the Cajon del Mapo region of the Andes, opening 3 new routes: "Ruta Polaca", "Diedro Polaco" and "La Perdida".

== Selected ascents ==
=== Ascents on eight-thousanders ===
- 2011 – Makalu
- 2012 – Gasherbrum I (first winter ascent)
- 2012 – K2
- 2013 – Broad Peak (first winter ascent)
- 2018 – Gasherbrum II (by the west face)

=== Ascents on other mountains ===
- "Colton-MacIntyre". Grandess Jorasses ED+, 1200m.
- "Shmid route". Matterhorn, TD+, 1100m.
- "Transylvania" Monte Cassale, VII, 1100m.
- "Via Luna 85", PlaccheZebratta, 6c, 400m.
- "Shangri-La" Osterva, VIII.
- "Szewska Pasja", Młynarczyk VII+.
- "Ruta Polaca", Cerro Arenas. TD+, 1000m. First ascent
- "La Perdida", Cerro Arenas. ED-,900m. First Ascent
- "Rubenzahl" Kandersteg. WI6.
- "Juvsola" Rjukan. WI6.
- "Original route" La Esfinge. 6c+/7a, 800m.

== Selected awards ==
- Best of ExplorersWeb 2012 Awards Winner: Gasherbrum I First Winter Ascent
- Feat of the year 2012 award by the Polish edition of National Geographic
- "The Spirit of Mountaineering Commendation" awarded by British Alpine Club to: Krzysztof Wielicki, Adam Bielecki, Denis Urubko, Jarosław Botor and Piotr Tomala for the rescue action on Nanga Parbat in winter 2018
- David A. Sowles Memorial Award 2019 by American Alpine Club for the Nanga Parbat rescue action for Adam Bielecki, Denis Urubko, Jarosław Botor and Piotr Tomala
- 2019 National Geographic Adventurers of the Year, for Adam Bielecki and Denis Urubko
- French Legion of Honour, for his part in the rescue mission on Nanga Parbat in 2019
