= Iraj (given name) =

- Pronunciation: IPA: [iːɹædʒ]
- Gender: Male

Origin
- Origin: Šāhnāme
- Region of origin: Greater Khorasan

Iraj (Persian: ایرج - Iraj) is a masculine given name of Persian origin. Notable people with the name include:

== Given name ==
- Iraj (singer) (1933–2026), Iranian singer
- Iraj Afshar (1925–2011), Iranian historian and scholar
- Iraj Amirakhori (born 1962), Iranian cyclist
- Iraj Arab, Iranian sports executive and administrator
- Iraj Janatie Ataie (born 1947), Iranian poet, lyricist, and playwright
- Iraj Azizpour (born 1988), Iranian kickboxer
- Iraj Bashiri (born 1940), Iranian-American historian
- Iraj Bastami (1957–2003), Persian classical musician and vocalist
- Iraj Danaeifard (1951–2018), Iranian footballer
- Iraj Dastgerdi (born 1955), Iranian fencer
- Iraj Ershaghi, Iranian-American petroleum engineer and academic
- Iraj Eskandari (1907–1985), Iranian politician
- Iraj Etesam (1931–2022), Iranian architect and author
- Iraj Ghaderi (1934–2012), Iranian actor
- Iraj Gorgin (1934–2012), Iranian-American radio and television broadcaster and journalist
- Iraj Harirchi (born 1966), Iranian politician and surgeon
- Iraj Hatam, Iranian footballer
- Iraj Kaboli (1938–2021), Iranian writer, linguist, and translator
- Iraj Khorshidfar, Iranian Greco-Roman wrestler
- Iraj Kiarostami (1963–2015), Iranian boxer
- Iraj Lalezari (1930–2019), Iranian academic
- Iraj Maani (born 1985), Iranian mountaineer
- Iraj Malekpour, Iranian academic and physicist
- Iraj Masjedi (born 1956/57), Iranian diplomat
- Iraj Mesdaghi (born 1960), Iranian writer and activist
- Iraj Mikaeilzadeh, Iranian volleyball player
- Iraj Mirza (1874–1926), Iranian poet
- Iraj Mottahedeh (born 1932), Iranian Anglican bishop
- Iraj Nazeri (born 1939), Iranian cardiologist and professor
- Iraj Nazerian (1939–1992), Iranian-Swedish dubber
- Iraj Pezeshkzad 1927–2022), Iranian novelist
- Iraj Rad (born 1945), Iranian actor
- Iraj Rahmanpour (born 1957), Iranian singer, songwriter, and writer
- Iraj Raminfar (born 1949), Iranian art director
- Iraj Safdari (1939–2018), Iranian make-up artist and actor
- Iraj Shahin-Baher (born 1972), Iranian politician
- Iraj Soleimani (1946–2009), Iranian footballer
- Iraj Tahmasb (born 1959), Iranian actor, screenwriter, and director
- Iraj Kalantari Taleghani (1937/38–2023), Iranian architect
- Iraj Tanzifi (1938–2024), Iranian scholar and sculptor
- Iraj Vahidi (1927–2022), Iranian engineer and politician
- Iraj Weeraratne (born 1981), Sri Lankan R&B artist
- Iraj Zandi (born 1931), Iranian-American academic
- Iraj Zebardast, Iranian poet

== Fictional characters ==
- Iraj (Shahnameh), character in Ferdowsi's Shahnameh
