= Iraj (disambiguation) =

Iraj is a mythical Iranian figure.

Iraj (Persian: ايرج) may also refer to:

- Iraj (given name), a Persian given name
- Iraj, East Azerbaijan
- Iraj, Isfahan
- Iraj, North Khorasan
