= Janusz Majer =

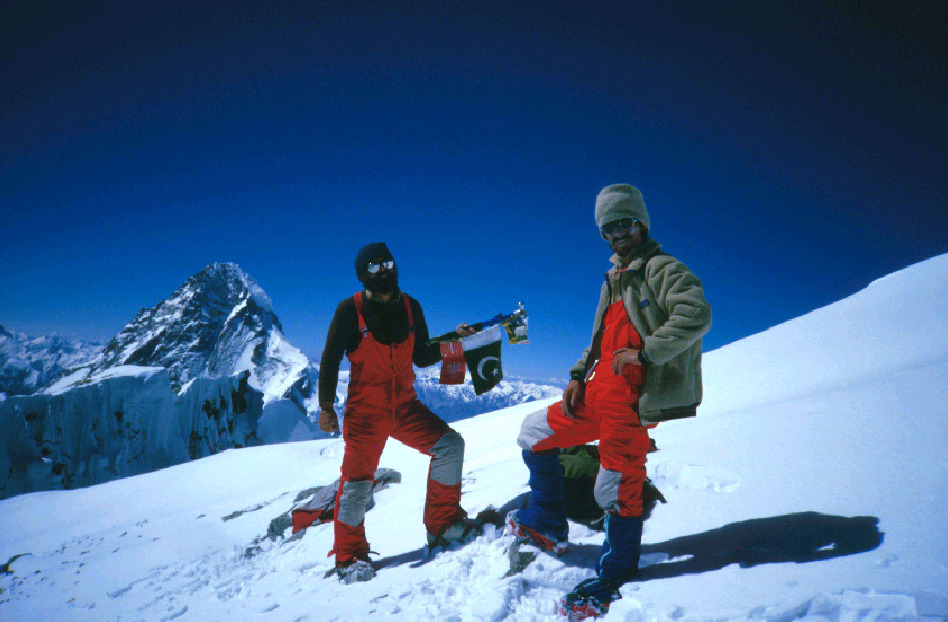
- Polish mountaineers Janusz Majer and Walenty Fiut on top of Broad Peak, with K2 in the background
- Born: September 25, 1946 (age 79)
- Occupation: Mountaineer

Janusz Majer (born September 25, 1946) is a Polish alpinist, himalayanist and traveler. He is co-founder and co-owner (together with Artur Hajzer) of ADD Company, the owner of Alpinus brand (1993–2001), co-founder of Mount Company, the owner of the HiMountain brand which produces outdoor clothing and equipment and co-owner of the large chain of HiMountain shops in Poland. Since 23 November 2013 he's been the head of the program "Polish Himalayas".

== Personal background ==
When Majer was 17, he finished a rock climbing course in the Jura Krakowsko-Częstochowska and started climbing in the Tatra Mountains. In 1971, he graduated from the department of metallurgy on Cracovian AGH. He is married to Zofia, an AGH graduate. They have one son.

== Professional background ==
Since 1976, Majer has continuously climbed abroad, inter alia in the Himalayas, Hindu Kush and Karakorum. Apart from climbing, he has also been engaged in the organization and logistics of expeditions. Between 1980 and 1992, a president of the Mountaineering Club in Katowice, which gathered the prominent alpinists and himalaists of that times: Jerzy Kukuczka, Krzysztof Wielicki, Ryszard Pawłowski, Artur Hajzer. He frequently organized the Mountain Film Festival in Katowice (1988, 1990, 1992). Member of many Mountain Film Festival Juries in Poland and in Europe (Teplice nad Metui Festival – Czech Rep., Poprad Film Festival – Slovakia, Bansko Film Festival – Bulgaria, Explorer Film Festival Łódź –Poland). An author of various articles in climbing press concerning mountain expeditions: Taternik, American Journal, Alpine Journal. A vice-chairman of the Polish Alpine Association between 1987–1993; an honorary member of the Mountaineering Club in Katowice.

=== Alpine expeditions ===
- 1975 – Mont Blanc 4810 m, Alps, France – the conquest of the summit,
- 1976 – Noshaq 7492 m, Hindu Kush, Afghanistan – the conquest of the summit,
- 1977 – Nanga Parbat 8125 m, Himalayas, Pakistan – the deputy leader of Silesian expedition,
- 1979 – Dunagiri 7066 m, Himalayas, India – the expedition’s participant,
- 1980 – Peruvian Andes and Yosemite, USA – the leader of the double expedition; in it, the first Polish ascent of The Nose, El Capitan, Yosemite Park – (Tadeusz Karolczak, Janusz Majer, Ryszard Pawłowski),
- 1982 – Langtang Lirung 7227 m, Himalayas, Nepal – the leader of the expedition (the summit was reached by Ryszard Pawłowski and Henryk Szczęsny),
- 1983 – Ganesh II 7118 m, Himalayas, Nepal – the leader of the expedition,
- 1984 – Broad Peak 8051 m, Karakorum, Pakistan – the leader of the expedition; the summit was reached by Walenty Fiut, Janusz Majer, Ryszard Pawłowski and Krzysztof Wielicki,
- 1985 – Lhotse 8516 m, Himalayas, Nepal – the leader of the expedition to the south face,
- 1986 – K2 8611 m, Karakorum, Pakistan – the leader of the expedition (the height of 8520 meters was reached) – the first ascent through the south buttress called “Magic Line” (the summit was reached by Peter Bozik, Przemysław Piasecki, Wojciech Wróż),
- 1987 – winter climbing in Scotland (Ben Navis and Lochnagar area),
- 1987 – Shishapangma, 8013 m, Himalayas, Tibet – a participant in the expedition, Majer participated in week long talks with the Chinese Mountaineering Association to gain permission for the climb to go ahead. The Association noted that this was the first time an expedition from a communist country had been given permission to attempt a climb. Arriving at Base Camp, Majer suffered from severe altitude sickness.
- 1988 – East Annapurna 8010 m, Himalayas – a participant of the expedition that opened a new route, on the right side of south face – the height reached by J. M 8000,
- 1989 – Mount Everest 8848 m, Himalayas, the west ridge – a participant of the expedition,
- 1994 – McKinley, Alaska, USA – the attempt of the ascent,
- 1998 – Vinson Massif 4892 m, Antarctica – the ascent of the summit; the attempt of the ascent of Acongaqua, Andes, Argentine,
- 2006 – Gasherbrum II – a participant, the height of 7400 meters was reached (camp IV),
- 2008 – Elbrus 5642, Russia – the summit was reached,
- 2008 – Mayer Kangri, Tibet – the exploration expedition in Mayer Kangri and Jomori Mountains area (Chang Tang),

=== Journeys and trekkings ===
- 1976 – truck travel from Nanga Parbat expedition with wife and 9-year-old son from Pakistan, through Afghanistan, Iran, Turkey, Bulgaria, former Yugoslavia, Austria, former Czechoslovakia do Poland
- 1981 – a family trip with wife and 14-year-old son to India, Sri Lanka, Thailand, Malaysia, Singapore and Nepal. Trekking to the base camp at the foot of Annapurna, Himalayas, Nepal
- 1997 – the traverse of Biafo and Hispar glaciers, Karakorum, Pakistan
- 1998 – Mount Everest – trekking in Khumbu and Gokyo area, Himalayas, Nepal
- 2000 – Spitsbergen, Atomic Mountains, a skitour-trekking expedition from Longyearbearen to Newton Toppen – the highest peak of Spitsbergen
- 2003 – Mount Sinai (Mount Moses), Egypt, trekking on the top
- 2008 – trekking in Khumbu Himal area, Himalayas, Nepal

== Published works ==
- Katowicka wyprawa na Ganesh Himal, Taternik 2/1984, Warszawa
- Katowicka wyprawa w Karakorum 1984, Taternik 2/1984, Warszawa
- W górach Ameryki, 1980, Taternik 1/1985, Warszawa
- Południowa ściana Lhotse, Taternik 2/1986, Warszawa
- Polska wyprawa na K2 1986, Taternik 2/1986, Warszawa
- Ben Nevis i Kazalnica, Taternik 1/1987, Warszawa
- Shishapangma Taternik 1/1987, Warszawa – the article written with together with Jerzy Kukuczka)
- K2's Magic Line, The American Alpine Journal (NY: The American Alpine Journal Club, 1987)
- Nowa droga na Annapurnę, 1988, Taternik 2/1988, Warszawa
- Annapurna South Face – Ascent and Tragedy, American Alpine Journal, 1989, p. 217-219
- Xixabangma 1987 The Alpine Journal 1990/91 (The Alpine Club: London) – the article written with together with Jerzy Kukuczka)
- Reconnaissance of the Mayer Kangri and Jomo Ri Mountains, elaborated by Janusz Majer and Jerzy Wala (Katowice, 2009)
- The Reconnaissance in Mayer Kangri and Jomo Ri Mountains, Chang Tang plateau in Tibet, Majer J. and Chwola G. (Japanese Alpine News, Vol II July 2010)
