= Iradj =

Iradj is a masculine given name of Persian origin. Notable people with the name include:

== Given name ==
- Iradj Alexander (born 1975), Swiss race car driver
- Iradj Fazel (born 1939), Iranian surgeon and academic
- Iradj Gandjbaksh (born 1941), Iranian cardiac surgeon

== See also ==
- Iraj (given name), a related given name
