= Simone Moro =

Italian mountaineer and alpinist (born 1967)

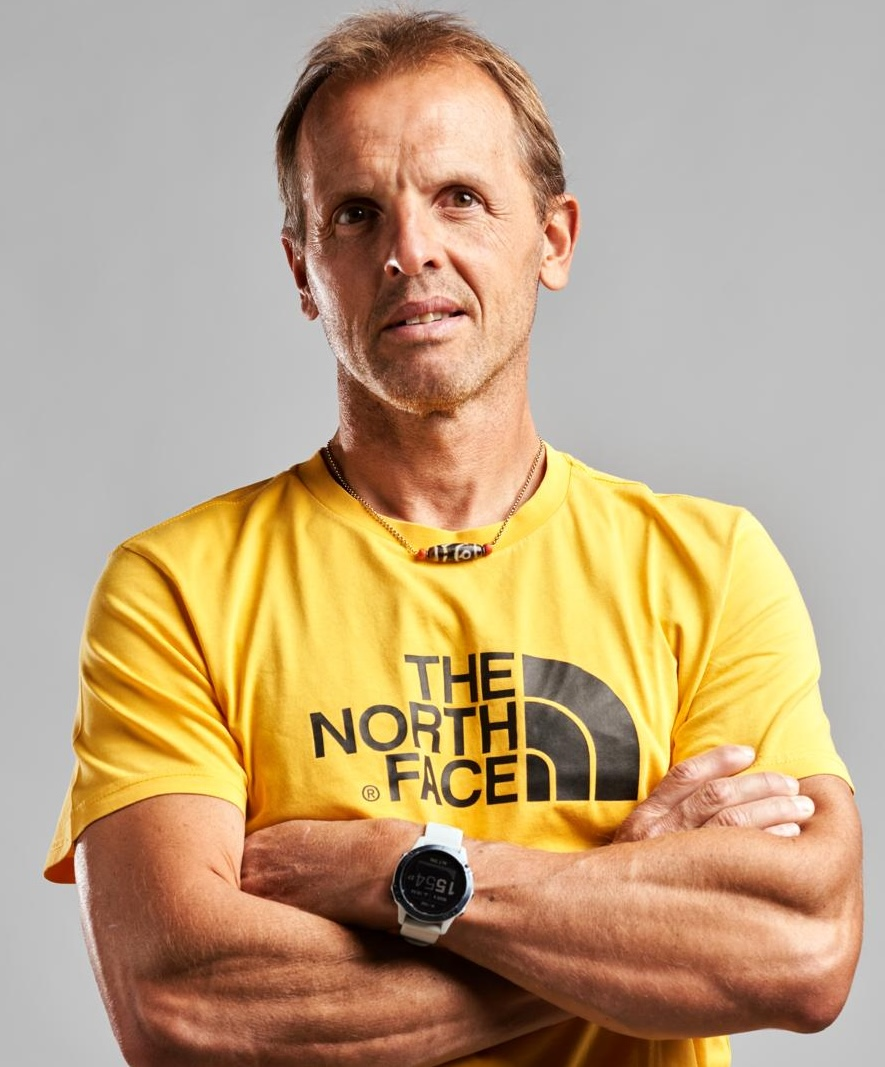
- Born: October 27, 1967 (age 58); Bergamo, Italy
- Occupations: Alpinist, pilot, writer and speaker
- Known for: Shishapangma (first winter ascent, 2005); Makalu (first winter ascent, 2009); Gasherbrum II (first winter ascent, 2011); Nanga Parbat (first winter ascent, 2016)

Simone Moro (born 27 October 1967 in Bergamo) is an Italian mountaineer and alpinist who is known for making first winter ascents of four of the fourteen eight-thousanders (peaks above 8,000 metres), which were: Shishapangma in 2005, Makalu in 2009, Gasherbrum II in 2011, and Nanga Parbat in 2016. No other climber has made more first winter ascents of an eight-thousander in history. He has summited Everest four times, in 2000, 2002, 2006, and 2010.

Moro is also an experienced helicopter pilot. In 2013, he and two other rescue experts carried out the world's highest long-line rescue operation on a helicopter, on Lhotse, at 7800m. On 12 November 2015 he set a new flight altitude world record in an ES 101 Raven turboshaft-powered helicopter (6705m). In 2023, Simone Moro conducted a daring rescue operation on the south side of Mount Everest, flying and landing at Camp III (7,350m) to save an Indian climber. Additionally, Moro made several flights to Camp II for rescue purposes. That season saw multiple casualties and rescue missions on Everest's south side, largely due to severe weather conditions.

== Early life ==
Born in Bergamo, in northern Italy, to middle-class parents, Moro grew up in the borough of Valtesse and was actively encouraged by his father in his passion for the mountains. His father was a cyclist and also fostered a lively and international environment around him. He started climbing on the Presolana and other massifs of the Bergamasque Alps at the age of 13. In 2003, at 35, he completed his university studies and graduated cum laude.

== Climbing career ==
Moro began his climbing activity on the Grigne near his home city. His father was his first mentor, and later Alberto Cosonni and Bruno Tassi. At that time he was primarily involved in rock climbing, an activity he has never given up. In 1992 he participated in his first Himalayan expedition, to Mount Everest. One year later Moro climbed Aconcagua in winter. He made expeditions to other mountains in the 1990s, including Cerro Mirador in winter and Makalu in 1993; Shishapangma and Lhotse in 1994, Kangchenjunga in 1995. In 1996 Moro climbed the west wall of Fitz Roy (3,341 m (10,961 ft) in Patagonia) in 25 hours from the base to the summit and back to the base. In the same year, he climbed Shishapangma South (8,008 m [26,273 ft]) without oxygen in 27 hours using skis in the descent from 7,100 m (23,300 ft). In 1997 he summited Lhotse. In Winter of 1997 he attempted the South face of Annapurna. During this attempt, his climbing companions Anatoli Boukreev and Dimitri Sobolev died in an avalanche. He tried Everest again in 1998; summited four peaks Pik Lenin (7,134 m (23,406 ft)), Peak Korzhenevskaya (7,105 m [23,310 ft]), Ismoil Somoni Peak (7,495 m (24,590 ft), formerly known as Pik Kommunizma), Pik Khan Tengri (7,010 m [23,000 ft]) with young Kazakhstan guide Denis Urubko; then summited Everest with him in 2000 and Marble Wall in winter 2001.

In 2002 he summited three peaks: Mount Vinson, Cho Oyu and Everest; summited three peaks: Broad Peak, Elbrus and Kilimanjaro in 2003, summited Baruntse along a new route and tried Shishapangma and Annapurna in 2004; Batura and Batokshi peaks in 2005, Broad Peak in winter 2006 and 2007. In 2005 he achieved the first winter summit of Shishapangma, with Piotr Morawski. In 2006 he completed a solo south–north traverse of Everest descending from the top in five hours.

In 2008 he made (with Hervè Barmasse) the first ascent of Beka Brakai Chhok (6,950 m (22,800 ft) Karakorum). The climbing was in pure alpine style and in 43 hours.

In January 2009 Moro made the first winter ascent of Makalu with Denis Urubko, and in February 2011 the first winter ascent of Gasherbrum II with Denis Urubko and Cory Richards. In April 2013, Moro, while climbing with Ueli Steck who was preparing for a traverse next spring of Everest and Lhotse, ignored the agreed upon plan that the lead Sherpa team would play ropes before anyone went past camp 2 and altercation with disgruntled sherpas began that according to The Guardian: "... went viral and Steck, wholly blameless in the affair, became severely depressed and disheartened". It would be a stretch to say that Steck was wholly blameless as he put his hands on the lead Sherpa while on a vertical face. Simone also grabbed the lead Sherpa by the chest while on a vertical face above 20,000 ft in an attempt to confront him and then cursed him in Nepalese, which was broadcast over the radio. A confrontation ensued when Simone returned to Camp 2. In February 2016, Moro completed the first winter ascent of Nanga Parbat with Alex Txikon and Ali Sadpara. In February 2018, he completed the first winter ascent of Peak Pobeda, Sakha along with fellow Italian mountaineer Tamara Lunger.

== Rescue missions ==
In May 2001 he tried to traverse Everest–Lhotse: during an attempt on the wall of Lhotse at 8000 metres he abandoned the climb to search, rescue, and save English alpinist Tom Moores. Moro was a recipient of the Fair Play Pierre de Coubertin trophy from UNESCO, the Civilian Gold Medal from Italian president Carlo Azeglio Ciampi and the David A. Sowles Memorial Award from the American Alpine Club. Tom Moores recalls his meeting with Moro this way:

On the way down we met Simone who had unfortunately failed to get to the summit because of the energy he had used rescuing me. I felt and still feel very guilty, but Simone who is a very humble man shrugged his shoulders and said, "It is no problem. In the future, I can still climb and you can still climb and that's more important than any summit." His sentiment is a lesson to us all, I believe it’s a perfect example of the true climbing spirit. I will never be able to thank him enough for what he did for me, he is an amazing man and a real hero.

— Tom Moores, 2001

In 2013, he bought a helicopter with his own money to carry out search and rescue operations in the Nepalese Himalayas for Nepalese people. He has piloted the helicopter several times to rescue alpinists, sherpas, trekkers, and people in remote areas.

== Charitable work ==
In 2003, Moro projected and financed a school for 396 Sherpa children in the Nepalese village of Syadul. The objective of the project, carried with an Italian foundation, was to prevent early school-leaving in the area. The school was opened in 2005. It is located in a village a thousand meters above sea level and three hours from the nearest road.

Near the Nanga Parbat base camp, he financed, built, and donated to the Pakistani district of Gilgit Baltistan a small masonry building for local shepherds and a small hospital in the village of Ser.

== Eight-thousanders climbed ==
S.No	Mountain	Years	Season
1	Shishapangma	1996, 2005	Winter (first winter ascent in 2004 Lafaille)
2	Lhotse	1994, 1997	Spring
3	Cho Oyu	2002	Spring
4	Broad Peak	2003	Summer
5	Makalu	2009	Winter (first winter ascent)
6	Mount Everest	2000, 2002, 2006, 2010	All Spring
7	Gasherbrum II	2011	Winter (first winter ascent)
8	Nanga Parbat	2016	Winter (first winter ascent)

== Bibliography ==
- Moro, Simone (2003). Cometa sull'Annapurna (in Italian). Corbaccio. ISBN 9788879725903.
- Moro, Simone (2008). 8000 metri di vita (in Italian). Grafica e Arte. ISBN 9788872012727.
- Moro, Simone (2016). Nanga (in Italian). Rizzoli. ISBN 9788817090230.

== Books ==
- Moro, Simone(2014) The Call of The Ice
- Moro, Simone(2003) Cometa sull'Annapurna [Italian]
- Ho visto l'abisso - Rizzoli, 2020
- I sogni non sono in discesa - Rizzoli, 2019
- Siberia -71°. Là dove gli uomini amano il freddo - Rizzoli, 2018
- Devo perché posso. La mia via per la felicità oltre le montagne (with Marianna Zanatta) - Rizzoli, 2017
- In cordata. Storia di un'amicizia tra due generazioni da zero a ottomila metri (with Mario Curnis) - Rizzoli, 2015
- Nanga. Fra rispetto e pazienza, come ho corteggiato la montagna che chiamavano assassina - Rizzoli, 2019
- 8000 metri di vita. Ediz. italiana e inglese - Corbaccio, 2023
- Everest. In vetta a un sogno. Nuova ediz. - Mondadori Electa, 2023
- A ogni passo. Le storie di montagna e di vita che racconto a mio figlio - Rizzoli, 2021
- Il team invisibile. Come diventare una squadra vincente e affrontare le sfide del lavoro e del mondo che cambiano (with Marianna Zanatta) - Rizzoli, 2021
- In ginocchio sulle ali. La passione per il volo, la missione di soccorso in quota: non voglio smettere di sognare - Rizzoli, 2020
