= Tomasz Mackiewicz =

Polish mountain climber (1975–2018)

- Born: 13 January 1975; Działoszyn, Poland
- Disappeared: 26 January 2018 (aged 43); Nanga Parbat, Pakistan
- Other names: Czapkins, Czapa
- Occupation: Mountaineer

Tomasz Mackiewicz (13 January 1975 – 30 January 2018) was a Polish high-altitude climber. He died on Nanga Parbat, an eight-thousander and the westernmost major peak in the Himalayas.

== Early life and expeditions ==
Born in Działoszyn, Poland. At the age of 12, together with his parents, he moved from Działoszyn to Częstochowa, where he later attended high school. While living in Częstochowa, he was addicted to heroin for several years.

In 2008, Mackiewicz was awarded a "feat of the year" award along with Mark Klonowski for an extensive traverse of Mount Logan. In 2009 he summited Khan Tengri 7,010 m (23,000 ft) as a solo climber. He tried several times to summit Nanga Parbat in winter. While climbing with Klonowski in 2015, he reached a height of 7,400 m (24,300 ft) and in 2016, along with the French climber Élisabeth Revol, he reached an altitude of 7,200 m (23,600 ft) on Nanga Parbat. He was the first climber in the world who climbed an eight-thousander in the alpine style in winter, for which he was nominated for the Piolet d'Or award.

== Death ==
On 25 January 2018, while attempting his seventh try at a winter ascent of Nanga Parbat, known as the "Killer Mountain", in Pakistan, at 8,126 m (26,660 ft), Mackiewicz had reached the summit from the Diamer side along with French climber Élisabeth Revol. At the summit, Revol noticed Mackiewicz's bad condition and started taking him down. According to Revol, he could not walk, see or even communicate and was bleeding profusely from his mouth and nose. She secured him from the wind in a crevasse, called for help and started her trip down the mountain. Mackiewicz had developed severe frostbite and snow blindness. It is also believed that he was in the later stages of high-altitude pulmonary edema and high-altitude cerebral edema. Revol had mild frostbite on five toes.

Another Polish team that was attempting a nearby summit of K2 was called for rescue. On 27 January 2018 the rescue team, including Denis Urubko and Adam Bielecki, were dropped off by a helicopter at 4,900 m (16,100 ft) on the mountain. The team rescued Revol at 6,026 m (19,770 ft) and brought her to safety. Mackiewicz, who was believed to be in his tent at around 7,400 m (24,300 ft), could not be rescued due to bad weather and a snowstorm.

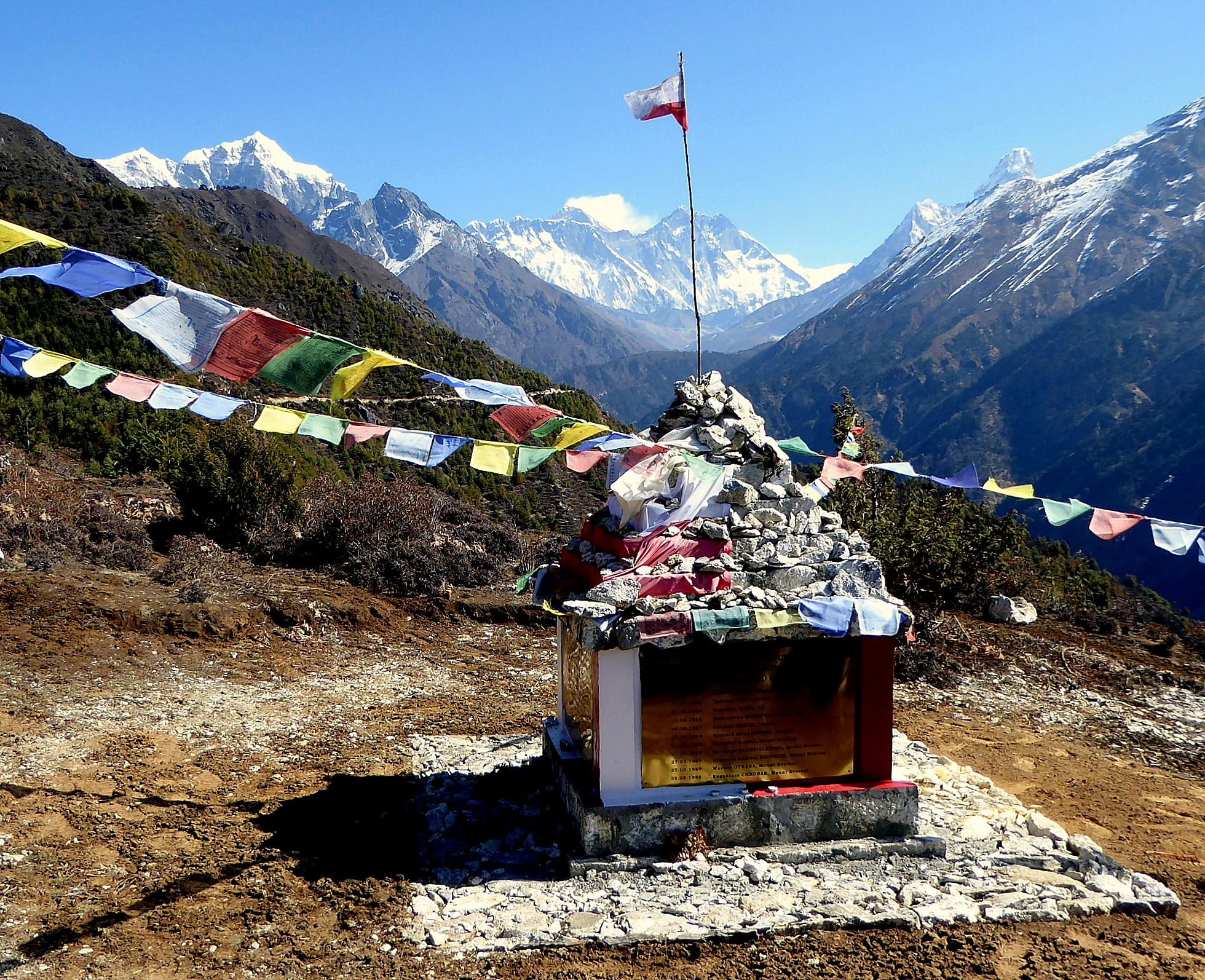
Memorial of Polish Himalayan Mountaineers, Namche Bazaar, Nepal. Tomasz Mackiewicz's name and date of disappearance is inscribed on the memorial.

Ludovic Giambiasi, Revol's partner, wrote on a Facebook post:

The rescue for Tomasz is unfortunately not possible – because of the weather and altitude it would put the life of rescuers in extreme danger, It's a terrible and painful decision. ... All our thoughts go out to Tomek's family and friends. We are crying.

Revol was later carried to Islamabad for treatment. Mackiewicz most likely died within 24 hours, but the cause is unknown and his body has not been found.

In March 2018, his father, Witold, received a death certificate from Pakistan, in which the date of his death was given as 30 January 2018.

== See also ==
- List of people who disappeared mysteriously: post-1970
