= Artur Hajzer =

Polish mountaineer (1962–2013)

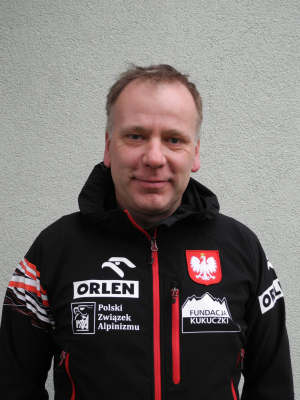
- Born: 28 June 1962; Zielona Góra, Poland
- Died: 7 July 2013 (aged 51); Gasherbrum I, Pakistan
- Education: University of Katowice, cultural studies
- Occupation: Mountaineer
- Organization: Organizer of the Polish Winter Himalayan Mountaineering Project
- Known for: First winter ascent of Annapurna
- Awards: Gentleman of Sport; Fair Play Award (1989), Polish Olympic Committee

Artur Henryk "Słon” Hajzer (28 June 1962 – 7 July 2013) was a Polish mountaineer. Hajzer summitted seven eight-thousanders, several via new routes (Manaslu’s NE face in 1986, Shishapangma’s east ridge in 1987) and made the first winter climb of Annapurna on February 3, 1987.

== Life ==
Hajzer began climbing at age 14 with the Tatra Scout club. At 16, he completed the COS Betlejemka climbing course in the High Tatras, then going on to climb routes in the Alps on Mont Blanc, including Petit Dru in 1981. As a teenager, he acquired the nickname "the elephant" (Słoń in Polish) for his climbing ability and endurance.

At age 20 he began climbing in the Himalayas. At age 21, he summitted Tirich Mir (7,708m) in the Hindu Kush, Pakistan.

In 1985 during a club expedition to Lhotse, he lost his then climbing partner, Rafał Chołda in an accident, and where he met his future climbing partner, Jerzy Kukuczka, who would have a considerable impact on Hajzer. Kukuczka and Hajzer would climb together through the rest of the 1980s, making a number of pivotal climbs together, including Manaslu, Shishapangma and the first ascent of Annapurna in winter in 1987.

He also summited Annapurna East (8010m) via a new route up the SE face in 1988. All these climbs were done alpine-style, without supplemental oxygen or Sherpa support.

In 1989, Hajzer organized a successful rescue operation on Mount Everest’s West Ridge for Andrzej Marciniak in 1989, supported by Sherpas Zangbu and Shiwa and New Zealanders Rob Hall and Gary Ball. The rescue earned him a "Fair Play" award from the Polish Olympic committee.

Hajzer returned to attempt Lhotse's South Face three times, reaching 8200 m in 1985, 8300 m in 1987 and 7200 m (alpine style) in 1989. In October 1989, Hajzer's partner Jerzy Kukuczka died in an accident on Lhotse. It was the second time he had lost a climbing partner to that mountain, and left a considerable impact, saying later it took "15 years" for him to get over the death, and gave up climbing. Alongside Janusz Majer, Hajzer started an outdoor equipment business.

=== Return to climbing and the Polish Winter Himalayan Mountaineering Project ===
In 2005, he returned to climbing, heading first to a summit attempt at Broad Peak, where he broke his leg. After a successful rescue at almost 8,000m, he went on to recover and post successful summits of Ama Dablam in 2006, Dhaulagiri in 2008, and winter attempts on Broad Peak and Makalu.

After meeting with younger climbers, Hajzer developed a proposal to the Polish Alpine Association and the Polish Ministry of Sports: the Polish Winter Himalayan Mountaineering Project. The project aimed to support the next generation of Polish climbers to make the first winter ascents on the remaining eight-thousanders unclimbed in the winter season. Hajzer became the expedition lead for the project, and in May 2010, the first expedition to Nanga Parbat was a success, with summits by Hajzer, Robert Szymczak and Marcin Kaczan. On September 30, 2011, he summited Makalu with Adam Bielecki and Tomasz Wolfart.

In 2012, as part of the Winter Mountaineering Project, he organized the first winter ascent attempt on Gasherbrum I, with summits by team members Adam Bielecki and Janusz Gołąb. The success of the expedition earned Hajzer considerable esteem, as well as the patronage of Poland's President, Bronislaw Komorowski, for the Polish Winter Himalayan Mountaineering 2010 – 2015 project.

The next year, as part of the 2010–2015 Polish Winter Mountaineering Program, the Polish Mountaineering Association led the first successful winter ascent of Broad Peak. The summit was successful, but came at a cost, with the loss of two climbers. While Hajzer was not the expedition leader of the attempt, as the organizer and architect of the winter mountaineering program, Hajzer received intense criticism for the program after the deaths, and took full responsibility for them.

=== Final climb ===
In July 2013, Hajzer died after falling in the Japanese Couloir on Gasherbrum I. The events of the accident where Hajzer lost his life are unclear, with suggestions from a technical accident, fatigue-related hallucinations, to suicide being theorized.

== Ascents on the eight-thousanders ==
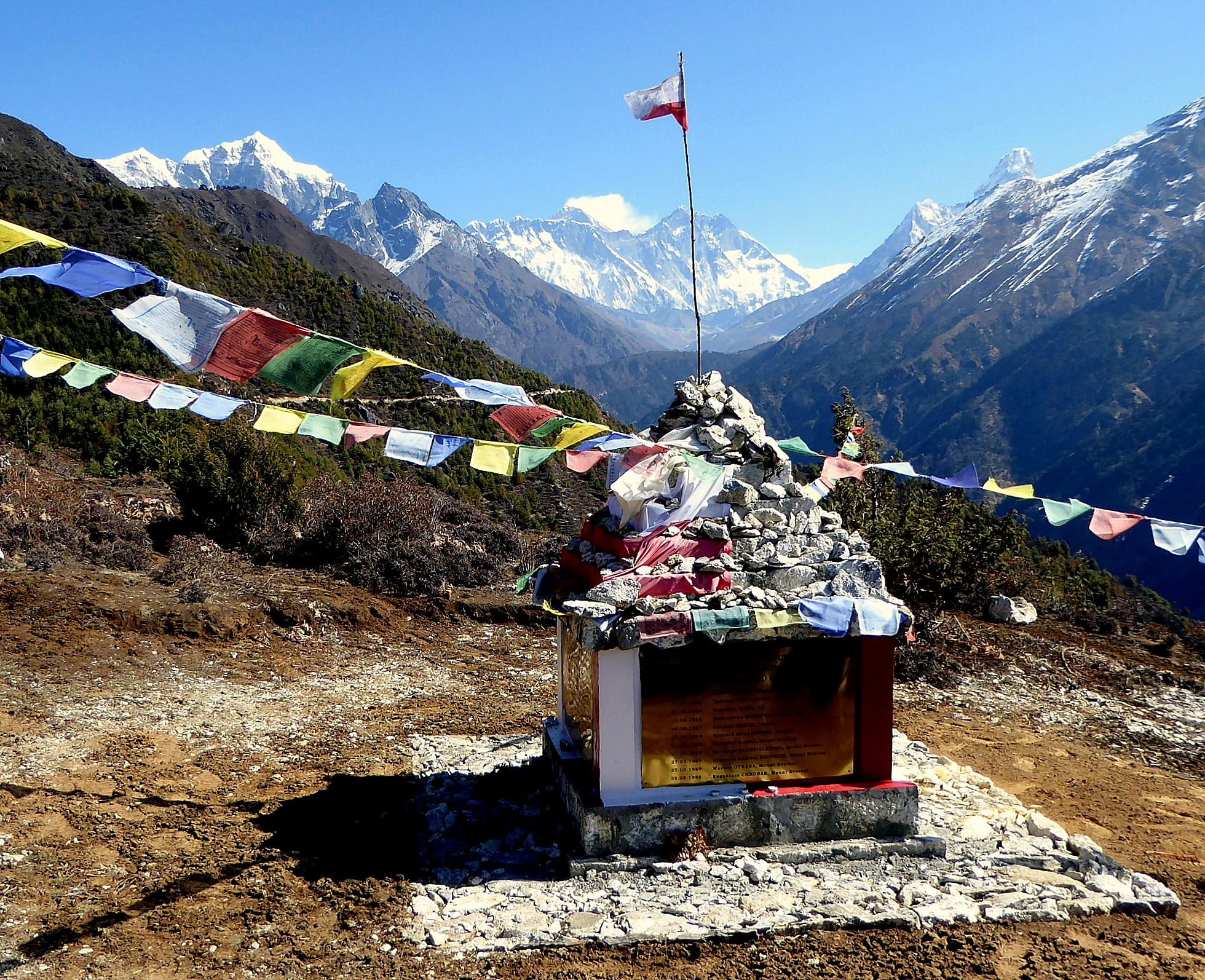
Memorial of Polish Himalayan Mountaineers, Namche Bazaar, Nepal. Artur's name and date of death is inscribed on the memorial.

- 1986 - Manaslu (new route, North East Face)
- 1986 - Kangchenjunga (did not attempt summit)
- 1987 - Annapurna (first winter ascent)
- 1987 - Shishapangma (new route)
- 1988 - Annapurna East (new route)
- 2008 - Dhaulagiri
- 2010 - Nanga Parbat
- 2011 - Makalu

== Climbing Books by Artur Hajzer ==
- Attack of Despair (in Polish Atak Rozpaczy) ISBN 8361968113
- The Crown of the Earth (in Polish Korona Ziemi) ISBN 978-83-7967-015-4

== See also ==
- List of deaths on eight-thousanders
- Adam Bielecki, climber who was supported by the 2010–2015 Polish Winter Mountaineering Program on several of his ascents
- Jerzy Kukuczka, Hajzer's longtime climbing partner
