= Denis Urubko =

Russian-Polish mountaineer (born 1973)

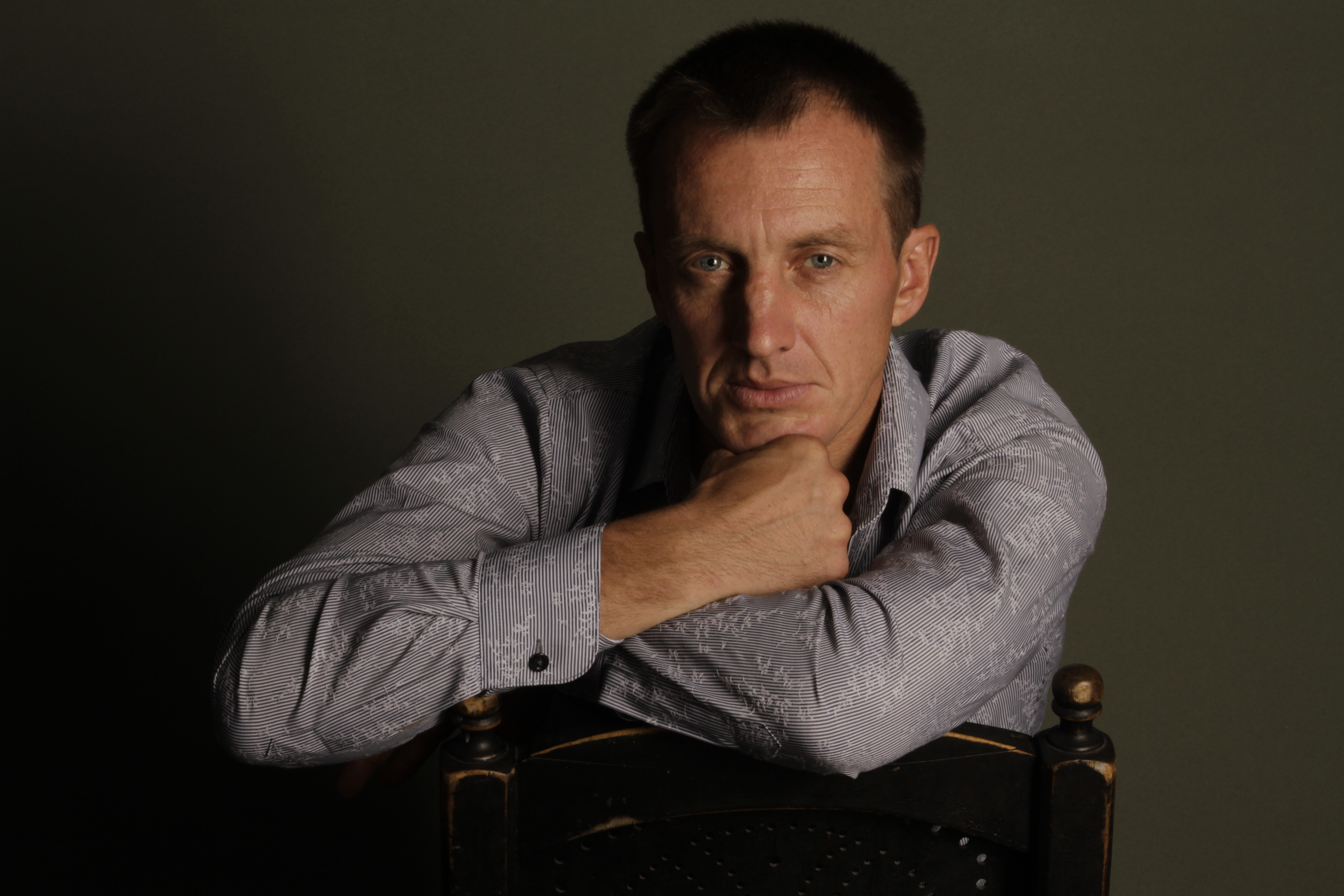
- Born: Denis Viktorovich Urubko; 29 July 1973 (age 53); Nevinnomyssk, RSFSR, USSR
- Citizenship: Russian and Polish
- Occupation: Mountaineer
- Known for: 25 ascents of 8,000-metre peaks

Denis Urubko (Russian: Дени́с Ви́кторович Уру́бко; 29 July 1973) is a Russian-Polish climber. In 2009, he became the 15th person to climb all 14 eight-thousanders and the 8th person to achieve the feat without supplemental oxygen. During his 25 eight-thousander climbs, he completed the first winter ascents for Makalu and Gasherbrum II, as well as establishing new routes on Cho Oyu, Manaslu, Broad Peak, and Nanga Parbat.

Urubko had Soviet citizenship, but after the dissolution of the Soviet Union he became a citizen of Kazakhstan, but renounced the citizenship in 2012. In 2013, he received Russian citizenship and on 12 February 2015 he received Polish citizenship.

== Mountaineering career ==
In 2006, he won the Elbrus Speed Climbing competition which he did by setting a new speed record, climbing from Azau station to the summit in 3 hours, 55 minutes and 58 seconds (record was beaten in 2010 by Andrzej Bargiel). This climb represents a vertical rise of almost 3,250 metres or more than 10,600 feet and thus a speed of more than 800 vertical metres (2,600 vertical feet) an hour. He summited almost 40 minutes ahead of the next finisher. He has also won the Khan Tengri Mountain Festival when he speed climbed the mountain from Base Camp at 4,200 metres to the summit at 7,010 metres and then back to Base Camp in 12 hours and 21 minutes, winning by over 3 hours.

He has climbed two 8,000-metre peaks in winter. Makalu in 2009 together with Simone Moro and Gasherbrum II in 2011 together with Cory Richards and again Simone Moro. He has also opened new routes on Cho Oyu, Manaslu and Broad Peak. All together he has 25 ascents of 8,000-metre peaks. He is also a "Snow Leopard" having summited the five 7,000-metre peaks of the former USSR in only 42 days in 1999. He climbs without additional oxygen.

On 27 January 2018, Urubko along with Adam Bielecki - while taking part in the Krzysztof Wielicki led Polish winter expedition on K2 - led a rescue operation on Nanga Parbat to save climbers Élisabeth Revol and Tomasz Mackiewicz, who were stuck on the mountain. Bielecki and Urubko were brought to the mountain by helicopter and climbed over 1000m through the night to reach Revol. They succeeded in bringing Revol to safety, but, were unable to save Mackiewicz due to the severe weather conditions. Then he resumed the K2 expedition, but due to the unfavorable snow and weather conditions and an accident causing injury to Rafal Fronia, the team canceled the planned approach via Cesen/Basque route and reached up to 7400m on the Abruzzi Spur route. Then in an unauthorized solo attempt, Denis Urubko reported that he probably reached up to 7600m having drawn criticism from his fellow climbers.

In 2019 remarkably, on 18 July, he summited Gasherbrum II by the normal route for acclimatization for his expedition to open a new route on Gasherbrum II. After 14 days, on 1 August 2019 at 8:40 pm, he reached the summit of Gasherbrum II again via a new route without supplemental oxygen.

== Eight-thousander climbs ==
Urubko completed the following successful ascents of eight-thousanders:

1. Everest (8848 m, without oxygen south normal route; 24 May 2000)
2. Lhotse (8516 m, without oxygen normal route; 23 May 2001).
3. Hidden Peak (Gasherbrum 1; 8068 m, without oxygen Japanese couloir; 13 August 2001)
4. Gasherbrum II (8035 m, without oxygen normal route speed ascent: from 5800 to top in 7 hours 30 minutes, and back to 5800 in 4 hours.; 20 August 2001)
5. Kangchenjunga (8586 m, classical SW-face route without oxygen; 13 May 2002)
6. Shisha Pangma (main 8046 m and Central summits (8012 m) without oxygen; 25 October 2002)
7. Nanga Parbat (8125 m, Kinshoffer route, without oxygen; 17 June 2003)
8. Broad Peak (8046 m, normal route without oxygen; 18 July 2003)
9. Annapurna I (8091 m, night ascent; May 2004)
10. Broad Peak (8046 m, SW Face first climb, with Sergey Samoilov, in alpine style; 25 July 2005)
11. Manaslu (8163 m, normal route, with Sergey Samoilov; 25 April 2006)
12. Manaslu (8163 m, NE face first climb, with Sergey Samoilov; 8 May 2006)
13. Dhaulagiri (8167 m, normal route; 5 February 2007)
14. K2 (8611 m, WW ridge, Japanese route, with Sergey Samoilov; 10 February 2007)
15. Makalu (8463 m; 5 December 2008)
16. Makalu (8463 m, first winter climb, with Simone Moro; 2 February 2009)
17. Cho Oyu (8201 m, SE Face, first climb, alpine style, with Boris Dedeshko; May 2009)
18. Lhotse (8516 m, new route from South Col, solo from C3; 16 May 2010)
19. Gasherbrum II (8035 m, first winter ascent, with Simone Moro and Cory Richards; 2 February 2011)
20. Kangchenjunga (8586 m, North Face; 19 May 2014)
21. Gasherbrum II (8035 m, normal route; 18 July 2019)
22. Gasherbrum II (8035 m, new route solo in 24 hours from 6100 meters to summit 1 August 2019)
23. Broad Peak (8046 m, solo, normal route without oxygen, 19 July 2022)
24. Gasherbrum II (8035 m, solo, normal route without oxygen, 25 July 2022)
25. K2 (8611 m, solo, normal route without oxygen, 29 July 2022)
