= Iraj Maani =

Iranian mountaineer

Personal information
- Nationality: Iranian
- Born: 18 June 1985 (age 40); Ardebil, Iran

Iraj Maani (born June 1985 in Ardabil, Iran) is an Iranian mountaineer. He started his climbing career when he was 15 years old. He has climbed his first Eight-thousander as a member of Iran's national mountaineering team. He is a member of the youth committee of the International Climbing and Mountaineering Federation.

Maani tried to make his first winter ascent of Nanga Parbat in 2014/2015 in a joint summit attempt between the Iranian team and the Spanish climber Alex Txikon. However, this attempt failed due to really bad weather conditions.

Iraj Maani established his second Adventure & Travel company in Iran. He is CEO of Irman Travel Group.

== 8000 m climbs ==
Name of the Peak	Summit year	Comments
Lhotse	2017	
Manaslu	2011	
Gasherbrum I	2011	
Gasherbrum II	2011	
Dhaulagiri	2010	

== Other notable climbs ==
Name of the Peak	Summit year	Comments
Island Peak (Imja Tse)	2015	
Aconcagua	2014	
Lenin Peak	2013	
Mount Elbrus	2013	
Kilimanjaro	2012	
Noshaq	2009	
Tilicho Peak	2008	
