= Cory Richards (climber) =

American climber (born 1981)

Personal information
- Born: May 1981 (age 45) Utah

Climbing career
- Known for: First American to climb an eight-thousander in winter, first winter ascent of Gasherbrum II

Cory Richards (born May 1981) is an American mountaineer and photographer. He became the first American to climb an eight-thousander in winter when he was part of the three man team who made the first winter ascent of Gasherbrum II.

== Personal ==
Richards was born and raised in Salt Lake City, Utah. His father, Court (George Lowe's mountain partner), taught him to climb when he was a child as young as 5.

He has written a book, The Color of Everything, about his life experiences in 2024.

== Climbing career ==
In January 2009, together with Ines Papert, Richards established a new route on the north face of Kwangde Shar (6093 m) in Nepal. A year later, in January 2010, he made the first ascent of the Central South Buttress of Tawoche (6495 m) in Nepal's Khumbu Valley, along with Renan Öztürk.

In 2009 Richards made an unsuccessful attempt on Makalu with Steve House but it wasn't until spring of 2010 that Richards summitted his first eight-thousander, Lhotse, climbing solo with oxygen.

Returning to the Himalaya in 2011 for another winter expedition, Richards and his two climbing partners, Simone Moro and Denis Urubko, made the first winter ascent of Gasherbrum II. They reached the summit at 11:30 am on February 2, 2011, without supplemental oxygen or porters and Richards became the first American to climb an eight-thousander in winter. During the descent, they were caught up in an avalanche, but eventually managed to reach their base-camp without major injuries. Richards filmed the expedition, the resulting film Cold won the Grand Prize at the 2011 Banff Mountain Film and Book Festival.

For the Gasherbrum II ascent, the three members of the team were awarded the Polish Colossians Prize for 2010 in the category of mountaineering, and Richards himself was also awarded the title of Adventurer of the Year for 2012 by National Geographic magazine.

An attempt on Everest in 2012 with Conrad Anker was unsuccessful, although returning to Everest in 2016 he summitted without using bottled oxygen. Then in 2021 he was unsuccessful on Dhaulagiri. In 2022 Richards stated that he was "leaving climbing behind, at least for a time".

== Photographic work ==
Richards was a National Geographic Photographer Fellow in 2014 and 2019, he photographs mountains and wildlife in the Himalayas and Karakorum, Antarctica, Southeast Asia, and Africa and his photography has appeared in National Geographic magazine, Outside, and The New York Times.
