= Élisabeth Revol =

French high-altitude climber (born 1979)

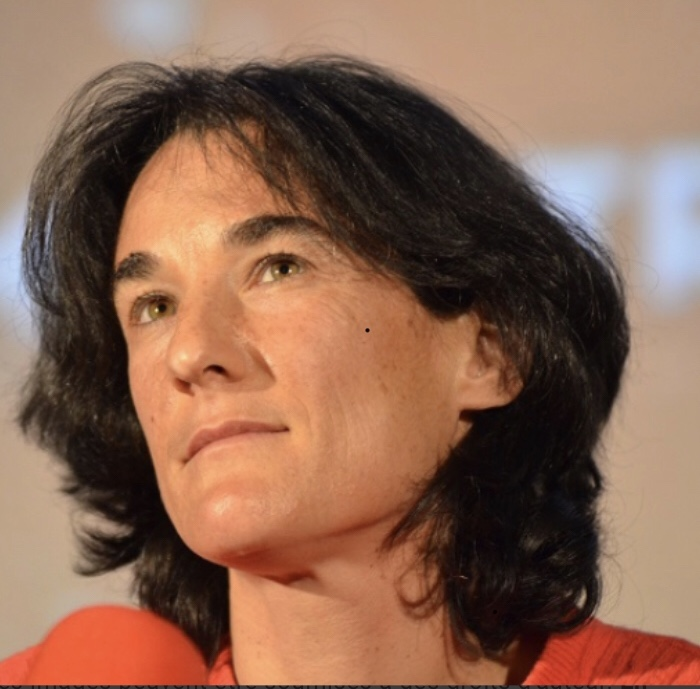
- Born: Crest, Drôme, France
- Occupation: Mountaineer

Élisabeth Revol (born 29 April 1979) is a French mountaineer. In January 2018, Revol became the first woman to climb Nanga Parbat in winter; on the descent, she was rescued, while her teammate Tomasz Mackiewicz died, an event which was widely covered by the mainstream press. Having narrowly avoided amputation of her left foot, she traversed Mount Everest and Lhotse consecutively in May 2019.

== Early life ==
Revol was born in Crest, Drôme, France and her parents introduced her to mountaineering in the Ecrins massif. She began climbing at age of 19 and became a physical education teacher.

== Career and expeditions ==
In 2007, Revol went on her first expedition to Nepal. In 2008, she made a solo ascent of three Karakoram mountains - Broad Peak, Gasherbrum and Gasherbrum II – within a 16-day period and without the aid of oxygen; her climbing partner Antoine Girard had fallen ill.

In April 2009, Revol attempted Annapurna with Czech climber Martin Minarik. After abandoning several attempts to gain Annapurna's main summit via the south-facing Bonnington route, Revol and Minarik reached Annapurna's East Summit via the 7 km ridge (altitude between 7,000 - 8,000 m) connecting the East summit to Roc Noir. Here, Revol and Minarik retreated, making no further attempt to gain Annapurna's main summit due to high winds. They returned to their high camp for the night, retracing their steps in the general direction of Roc Noir (7,485 m). The next day, while continuing their descent, weather conditions deteriorated and Revol and Minarik were separated somewhere above 7,000 m. Unable to locate Minarik in the deteriorating visibility, Revol continued her descent alone, taking a (mostly) North/north-east facing col in the direction of Tilicho Lake. The following morning, after spending the night in a crevasse somewhere around 6000 m, Revol reported seeing Minarik descending the ridge at the top of the same col she took leading to Tilicho Lake. However, the weather closed in rapidly and she lost sight of him. Out of food, water, fuel, and phone batteries, Revol continued her descent, eventually reaching the village of Manang from where she arranged for a rescue. A helicopter search was mounted (Fishtail Air); a multi-day ground search was also conducted by a small party of Sherpas. The ground search was abandoned after several days after becoming too dangerous to continue on with gaining further elevation in search of a sign of Minarik. Despite these extensive search efforts, no sign of Minarik was found.

In 2012, she participated in the Adventure Racing World Championships in France, which includes navigation, trekking, mountain biking, paddling and climbing. Revol joined Daniele Nardi in the winter of 2013, and Polish climber Tomasz Mackiewicz in the winter of 2015 to climb Nanga Parbat, known as the "Killer Mountain", in Pakistan; in 2015 Mackiewicz and Revol reached 7800m, and turned back because of bad weather. In January 2018, they successfully climbed Nanga Parbat in winter as the second team ever. Revol became the first woman to climb Nanga Parbat in winter.

On 23 May 2019, she reached the summit of Mount Everest using supplemental oxygen and climbed the adjacent Lhotse the following day.

== Rescue ==
On 25 January 2018, during her fourth attempt of a winter ascent of Nanga Parbat, and Mackiewicz's seventh attempt, they reached the summit from the Diamer side. Revol noticed Mackiewicz's bad condition and started taking him down. According to Revol, he could not walk, see or communicate and was bleeding profusely from his mouth and nose; he had developed severe frostbite and snow blindness. She secured him from the wind in a crevasse, called for help and started the long descent.

Another Polish team which attempted the nearby summit of K2 was called for rescue. On 27 January 2018 the rescue team, including Denis Urubko and Adam Bielecki, were dropped off by a helicopter of the Pakistani military at 4,900 m (16,100 ft) on the mountain, and climbed 1,200m through the night rescuing Revol at 6,026 m (19,770 ft). Mackiewicz, who was believed to be in his tent at around 7,400 m (24,300 ft), could not be rescued due to bad weather and a snowstorm. She weighed just 45 kg when the rescue team managed to evacuate her, and suffered from severe frostbite to her hands and left foot. Revol was later carried to Islamabad for treatment, but was able to avoid any amputations.

== Personal life ==
Revol's partner is Jean-Christophe. She is employed by Valandré, a high altitude down equipment manufacturer in Belcaire.
