= Nanga Parbat =

9th-highest mountain on Earth

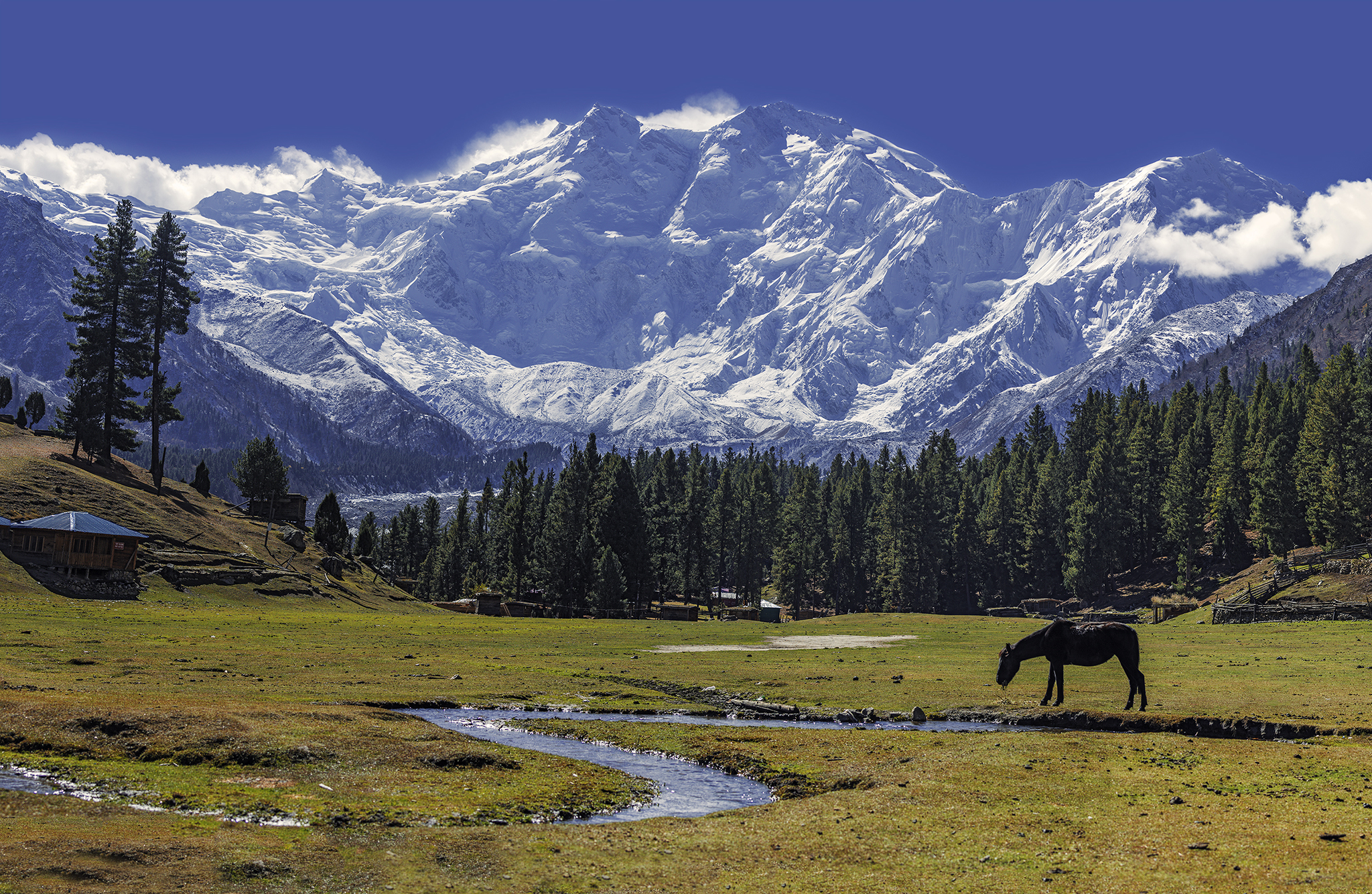
- Nanga Parbat viewed from Fairy Meadows

Highest point
- Elevation: 8,126 m (26,660 ft); Ranked 9th
- Prominence: 4,608 m (15,118 ft); Ranked 14th
- Listing: Eight-thousander; Ultra; List of mountains in Pakistan
- Coordinates: 35°14′15″N 74°35′21″E

Naming
- Native name: نانگا پربت (Urdu)

Geography
- The major peaks (not mountains) above 7,500 m (24,600 ft) height in Himalayas, rank identified in Himalayas alone (not the world). Legend: 1：Mount Everest; 2：Kangchenjunga; 3：Lhotse; 4：Yalung Kang, Kanchenjunga West; 5：Makalu; 6：Kangchenjunga South; 7：Kangchenjunga Central; 8：Cho Oyu; 9：Dhaulagiri; 10：Manaslu (Kutang); 11：Nanga Parbat (Diamer); 12：Annapurna; 13：Shishapangma (Shishasbangma, Xixiabangma); 14：Manaslu East; 15：Annapurna East Peak; 16： Gyachung Kang; 17：Annapurna II; 18：Tenzing Peak (Ngojumba Kang, Ngozumpa Kang, Ngojumba Ri); 19：Kangbachen; 20：Himalchuli (Himal Chuli); 21：Ngadi Chuli (Peak 29, Dakura, Dakum, Dunapurna); 22：Nuptse (Nubtse); 23：Nanda Devi; 24：Chomo Lonzo (Chomolonzo, Chomolönzo, Chomo Lönzo, Jomolönzo, Lhamalangcho); 25：Namcha Barwa (Namchabarwa); 26：Zemu Kang (Zemu Gap Peak); 27：Kamet; 28：Dhaulagiri II; 29：Ngojumba Kang II; 30：Dhaulagiri III; 31：Kumbhakarna Mountain (Mount Kumbhakarna, Jannu); 32：Gurla Mandhata (Naimona'nyi, Namu Nan); 33：Hillary Peak (Ngojumba Kang III); 34：Molamenqing (Phola Gangchen); 35：Dhaulagiri IV; 36：Annapurna Fang; 37：Silver Crag; 38：Kangbachen Southwest; 39：Gangkhar Puensum (Gangkar Punsum); 40：Annapurna III; 41：Himalchuli West; 42：Annapurna IV; 43：Kula Kangri; 44：Liankang Kangri (Gangkhar Puensum North, Liangkang Kangri); 45：Ngadi Chuli South; Location of Nanga Parbat
- Location: Pakistan-administered Gilgit–Baltistan
- Parent range: Himalayas

Climbing
- First ascent: 3 July 1953 by Hermann Buhl on 1953 German–Austrian Nanga Parbat expedition First winter ascent: 26 February 2016 by Ali Sadpara, Simone Moro, and Alex Txikon
- Easiest route: Western Diamer District

Nanga Parbat, (Note: Urdu: [nəŋɡa pərbət̪], نانگا پربت; lit. 'naked mountain') known in Shina as Diamer, (Note: Shina: دیآمر, lit. 'mountain of God' or lit. 'heavenly mountain') is the ninth-highest mountain on Earth with its summit at 8,126 m (26,660 ft) above sea level. Lying immediately southeast of the northernmost bend of the Indus River in the Gilgit-Baltistan region of Pakistan-administered Kashmir, Nanga Parbat is the westernmost major peak of the Himalayas, and thus in the traditional view of the Himalayas as bounded by the Indus and Yarlung Tsangpo/Brahmaputra rivers, it is the western anchor of the entire mountain range.

Nanga Parbat is one of the 14 eight-thousanders. It rises far above its surrounding terrain and has the second-highest prominence among the 100 tallest mountains on Earth only behind Mount Everest. Nanga Parbat is well-known for being an extremely difficult climb, and has earned the nickname Killer Mountain for its high number of climber fatalities and pushing climbers to their limits. According to Guinness World Records, Nanga Parbat is the fastest growing mountain in the world, growing taller at a rate of 7 mm (0.27 in) per year.

== Etymology ==
The name Nanga Parbat is derived from the Sanskrit words nagna ("naked") and parvata ("mountain"), which, when combined, translate to "naked mountain". The name refers to the south face, which is usually snowless. The mountain is known locally by its Shina name Diamer or Deo Mir, from Sanskrit dēva (God) and mēru (sacred mountain), meaning "mountain of God" or "heavenly mountain".

== Location ==
Nanga Parbat forms the western anchor of the Himalayan Range and is the westernmost eight-thousander. It lies just south of the Indus River in the Nanga Parbat National Park of Gilgit–Baltistan, at the border of Diamer and Astore districts. In some places, the river flows more than 7 kilometres (4 1/2 miles) below the high-point of the massif. To the north is the western end of the Karakoram range.

== Notable features ==
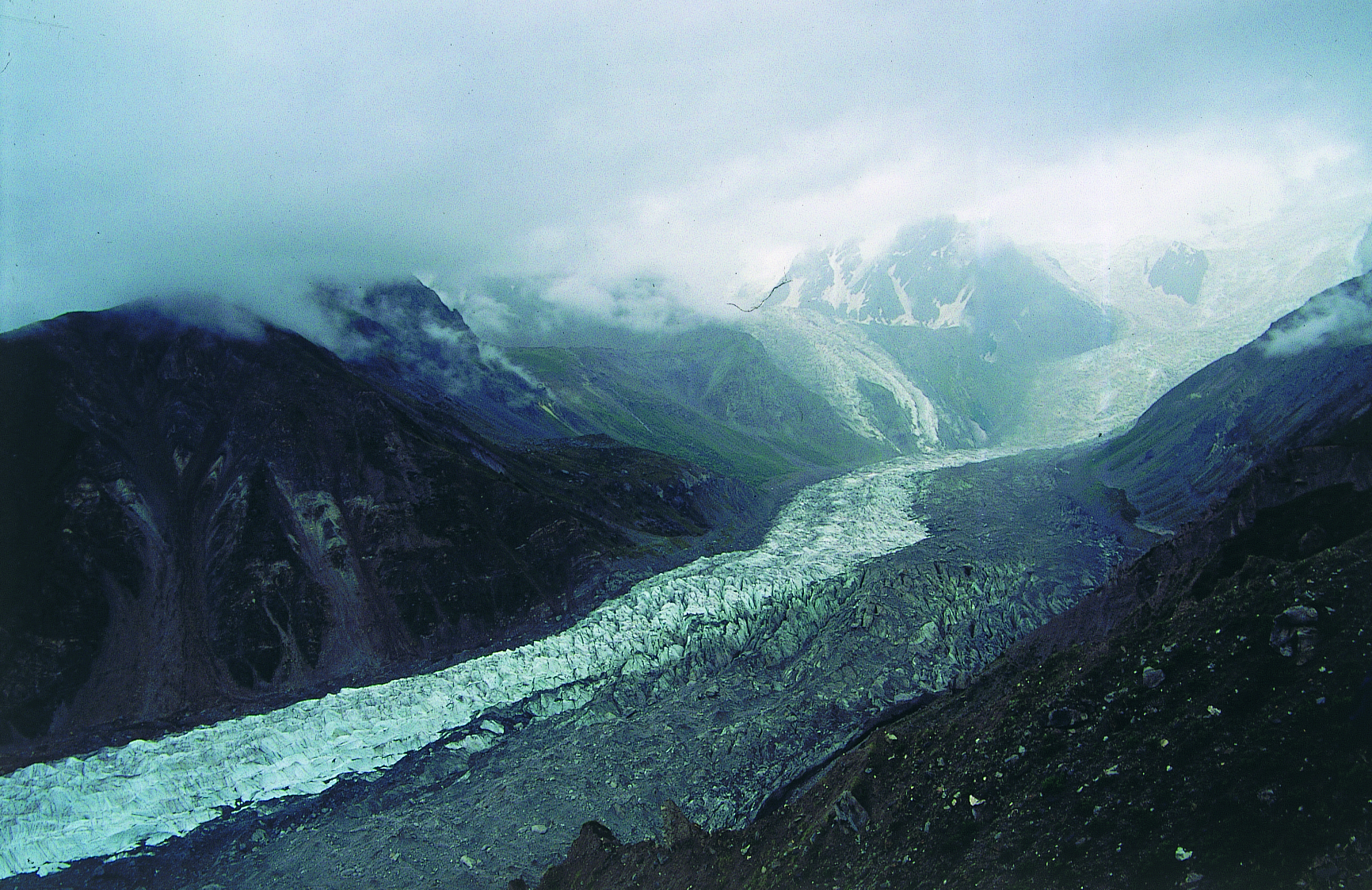
Rakhiot glacier is located on part of the mountain

Nanga Parbat has tremendous vertical relief over local terrain in all directions. To the south, Nanga Parbat has what is often referred to as the highest mountain face in the world: the Rupal Face rises 4,600 m (15,090 ft) above its base. To the north, the complex, somewhat more gently sloped Rakhiot Flank rises 7,000 m (23,000 ft) from the Indus River valley to the summit in just 25 km (16 mi), one of the ten greatest elevation gains in such a short distance on Earth.

Nanga Parbat is one of only two peaks on Earth that rank in the top twenty of both the highest mountains in the world, and the most prominent peaks in the world, ranking ninth and fourteenth respectively. The other is Mount Everest, which ranks first on both lists. Nanga Parbat is also the second most prominent peak of the Himalayas, after Mount Everest. The key col for Nanga Parbat is Zoji La in Kashmir Valley, which connects it to higher peaks in the remaining Himalaya-Karakoram range.

On the Tibetan Plateau, Nanga Parbat is the westernmost peak of the Himalayas, whereas Namcha Barwa marks the east end.

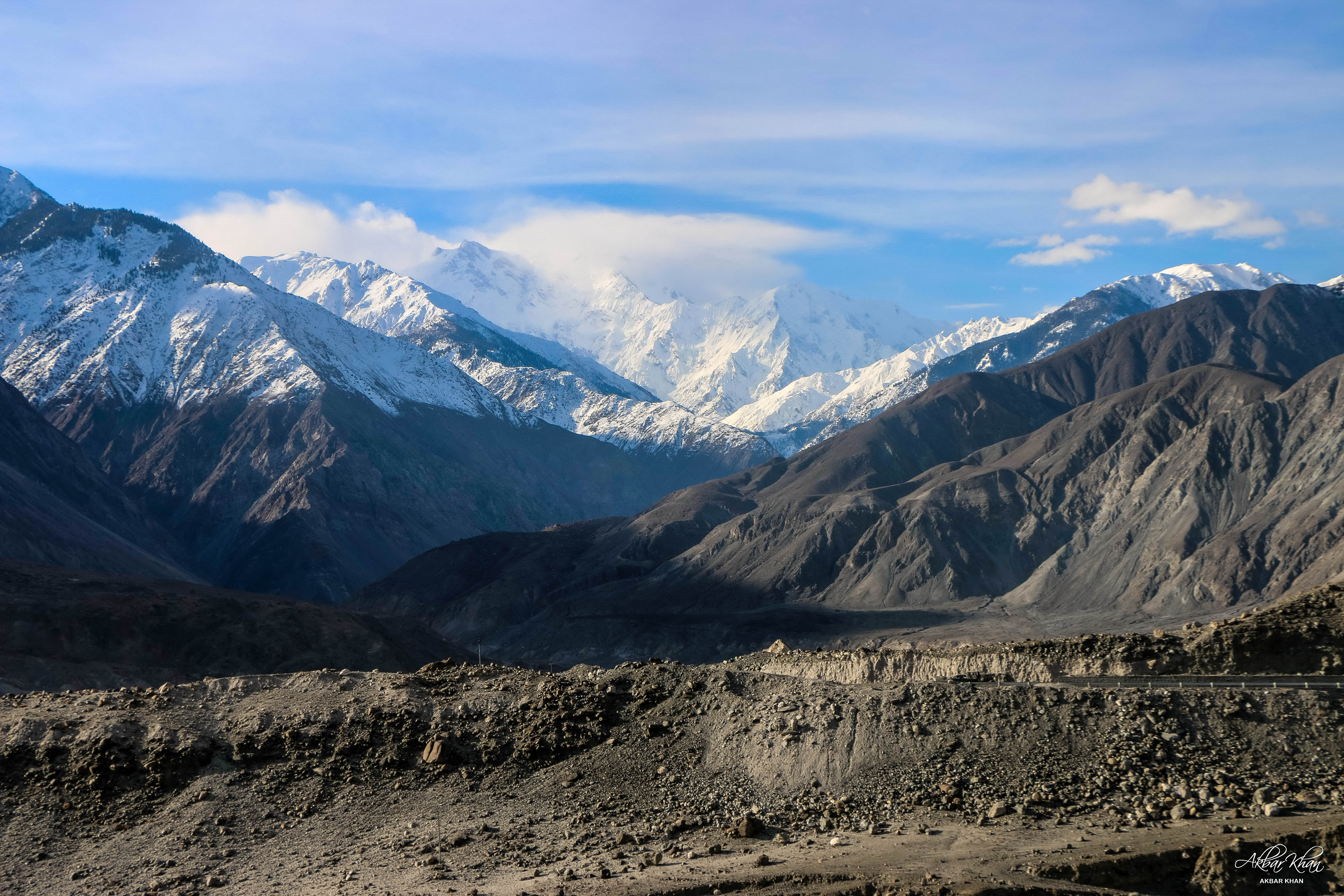
Nanga Parbat as viewed from Karakoram Highway

== Layout of the mountain ==
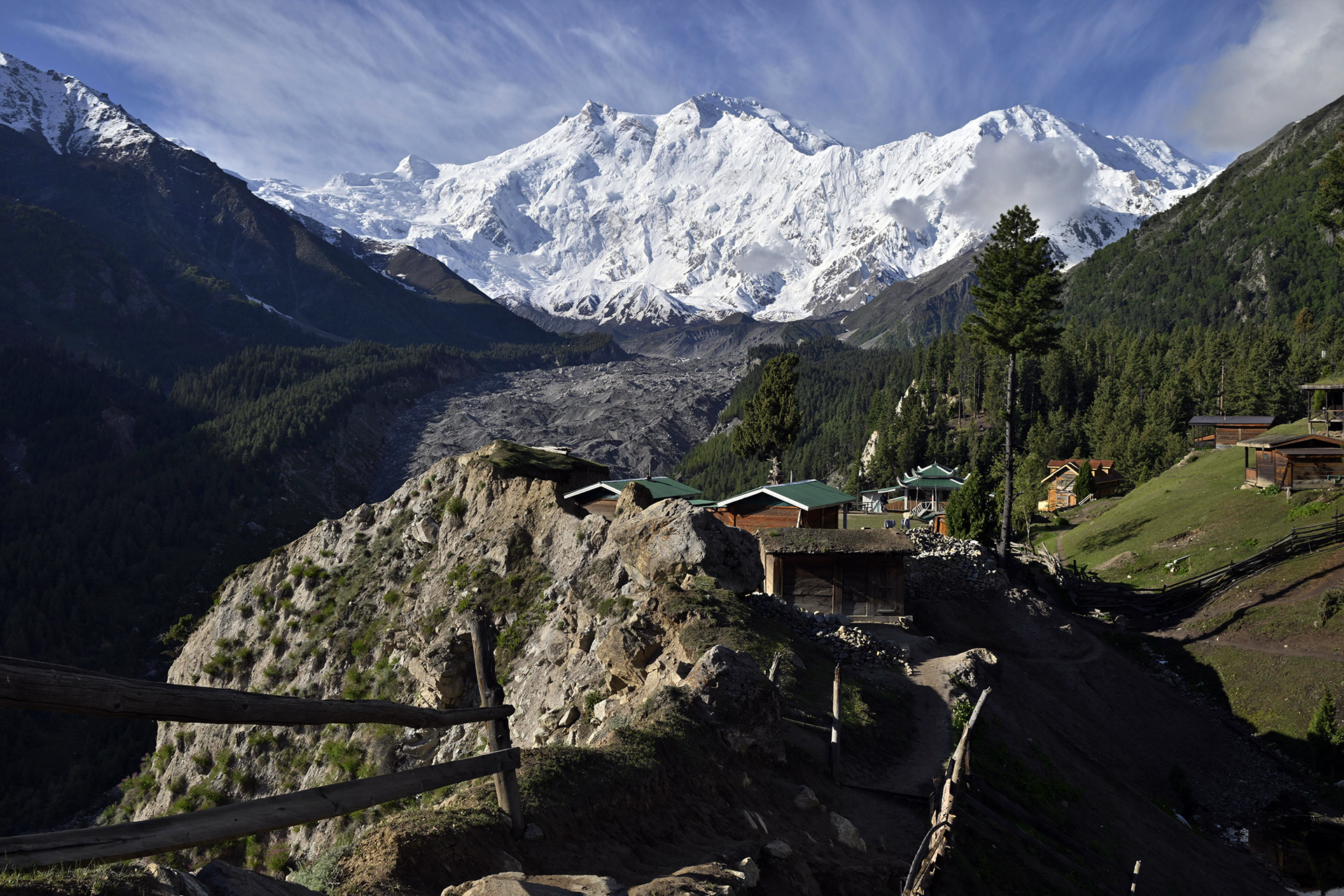
Nanga Parbat and the moraine below it, seen from Fairy Meadows

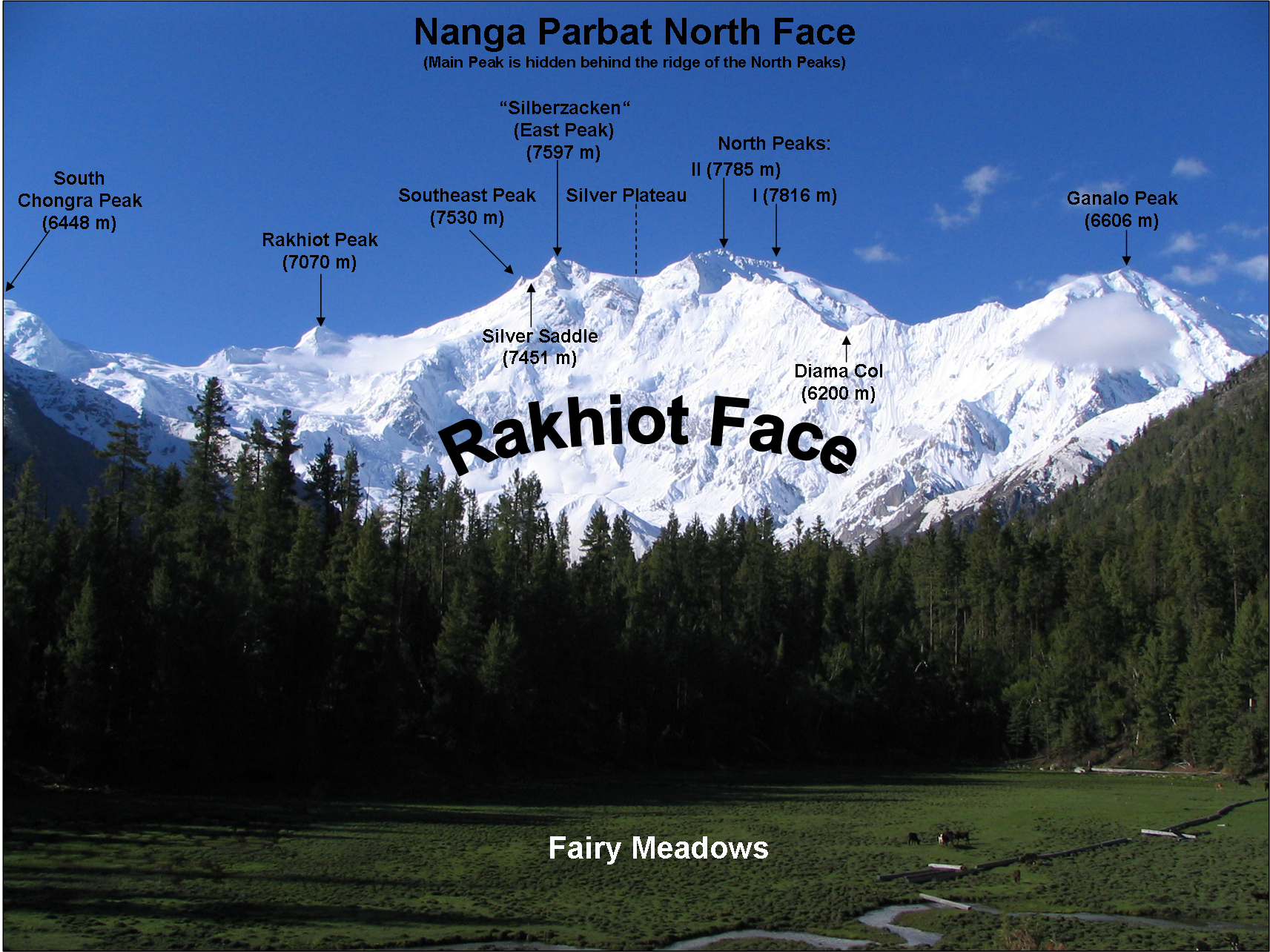
Nanga Parbat Rakhiot Face from Fairy Meadows

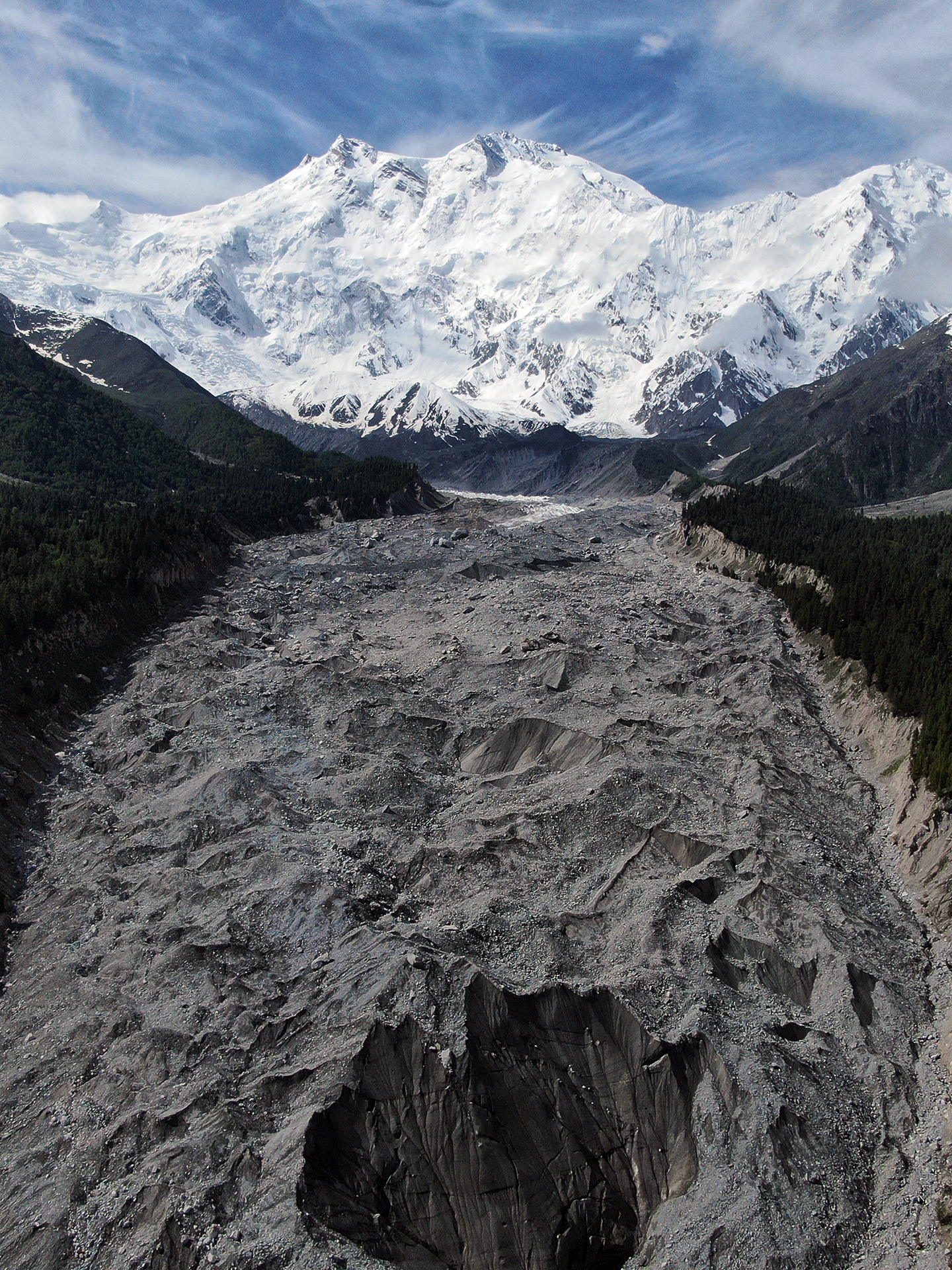
Aerial view of the northern face of Nanga Parbat as seen from above Fairy Meadows

The core of Nanga Parbat is a long ridge trending southwest-to-northeast. The ridge is composed of an enormous bulk of ice and rock. It has three primary faces: the Diamir, Rakhiot, and Rupal. The southwestern portion of this main ridge is known as the Mazeno Ridge, and has a number of subsidiary peaks. In the other direction, the main ridge arcs northeast at Rakhiot Peak (7,070 m or 23,200 ft). The south/southeast side of the mountain is dominated by the Rupal Face. The north/northwest side of the mountain, leading to the Indus, is more complex. It is split into the Diamir (west) face and the Rakhiot (north) face by a long ridge. There are a number of subsidiary summits, including North Peak (7,816 m or 25,643 ft) some three kilometres (2 mi) north of the main summit. Near the base of the Rupal Face is a glacial lake called Latbo, above a seasonal shepherds' village of the same name.

== Climbing history ==
=== Early attempts ===
As a result of its accessibility, attempts to reach the summit of Nanga Parbat began very soon after it was discovered by Europeans. In 1895, Albert F. Mummery led an expedition to the peak, accompanied by Geoffrey Hastings, and reached almost 6,100 m (20,000 ft) on the Diamir (West) Face, but Mummery and two Gurkha companions later died reconnoitering the Rakhiot Face.

In the 1930s, Nanga Parbat became the focus of German interest in the Himalayas. The German mountaineers were unable to attempt Mount Everest, since only the British had access to Tibet. Initially German efforts focused on Kangchenjunga, to which Paul Bauer led two expeditions in 1930 and 1931, but with its long ridges and steep faces, Kangchenjunga was more difficult than Everest and neither expedition made much progress. K2 was known to be harder still, and its remoteness meant that even reaching its base would be a major undertaking. Nanga Parbat was therefore the highest mountain accessible to Germans and was also deemed reasonably possible by climbers at the time.

The first German expedition to Nanga Parbat was led by Willy Merkl in 1932. It is sometimes referred to as a German-American expedition, as the eight climbers included two Americans, Rand Herron and Elizabeth Knowlton, along with Fritz Wiessner, who would become an American citizen the following year. While the team were all strong climbers, none had Himalayan experience, and poor planning (particularly an inadequate number of porters), coupled with bad weather, prevented the team from progressing far beyond the Rakhiot Peak northeast of the Nanga Parbat summit, reached by Peter Aschenbrenner and Herbert Kunigk, but they did establish the feasibility of a route via Rakhiot Peak and the main ridge.

Merkl led another expedition in 1934, which was better prepared and financed with full support from the new Nazi government. Early in the expedition Alfred Drexel died, likely due to high altitude pulmonary edema. The Tyrolean climbers, Peter Aschenbrenner and Erwin Schneider, reached an estimated height of 7,900 m (25,900 ft) on July 6, but were forced to return because of worsening weather. On July 7, they and 14 others were trapped by a storm at 7,480 m (24,540 ft). During the desperate retreat that followed, three famous German mountaineers, Ulrich Wieland, Willo Welzenbach and Merkl himself, as well as six Sherpas, died of exhaustion, exposure, and altitude sickness, and several others suffered severe frostbite. The last survivor to reach safety, Ang Tsering, did so having spent seven days battling through the storm. It has been said that the disaster, "for sheer protracted agony, has no parallel in climbing annals."

In 1937, Karl Wien led another expedition to the mountain, following the same route as Merkl's expeditions had done. Progress was made, but more slowly than before due to heavy snowfall. About 14 June, seven Germans and nine Sherpas, almost the entire team, were at Camp IV below Rakhiot Peak when it was overrun by an avalanche. All sixteen men died. The search team found that the tents had been buried by ice and snow rather than swept away. One of the victim's diaries read "our situation here is not quite safe from avalanches".

The Germans returned in 1938 led by Paul Bauer, but the expedition was plagued by bad weather, and Bauer, mindful of the previous disasters, ordered the party down before the Silver Saddle (German: Silbersattel), halfway between Rakhiot Peak and Nanga Parbat summit, was reached.

=== Aufschnaiter expedition ===
Heinrich Harrer, an expert mountaineer, was a member of the SS Alpine unit. The unit practiced on the Eiger in Switzerland in 1938. When the group returned to Germany, Adolf Hitler met with them.

In May 1939, Harrer was selected by the German Himalayan Foundation to take part in a new expedition to Nanga Parbat, under the leadership of Peter Aufschnaiter. Their goal was to scout new ways to ascend the north-western face. They explored the Diamir Face with the aim of finding an easier route. They concluded that the face was a viable route, but World War II intervened and the four men were interned by the British in Dehradun, India. Harrer's and Aufschnaiter's escape and subsequent wanderings across the Tibetan Plateau became the subject of Harrer's book Seven Years in Tibet. Some evidence of this expedition is kept in the National Archives of Washington, D.C.

=== First ascent ===
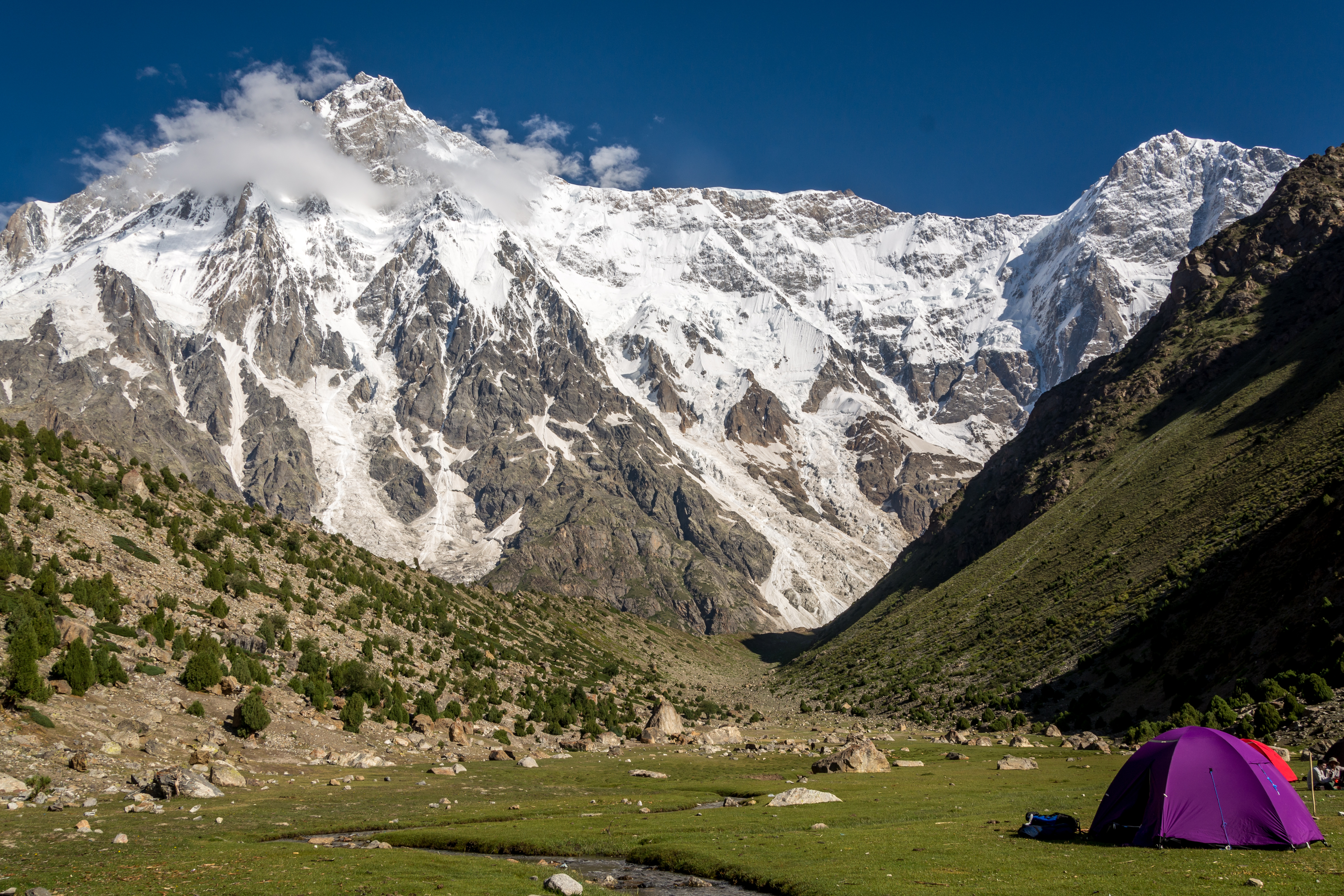
Nanga Parbat Rupal Base camp, Gilgit Baltistan

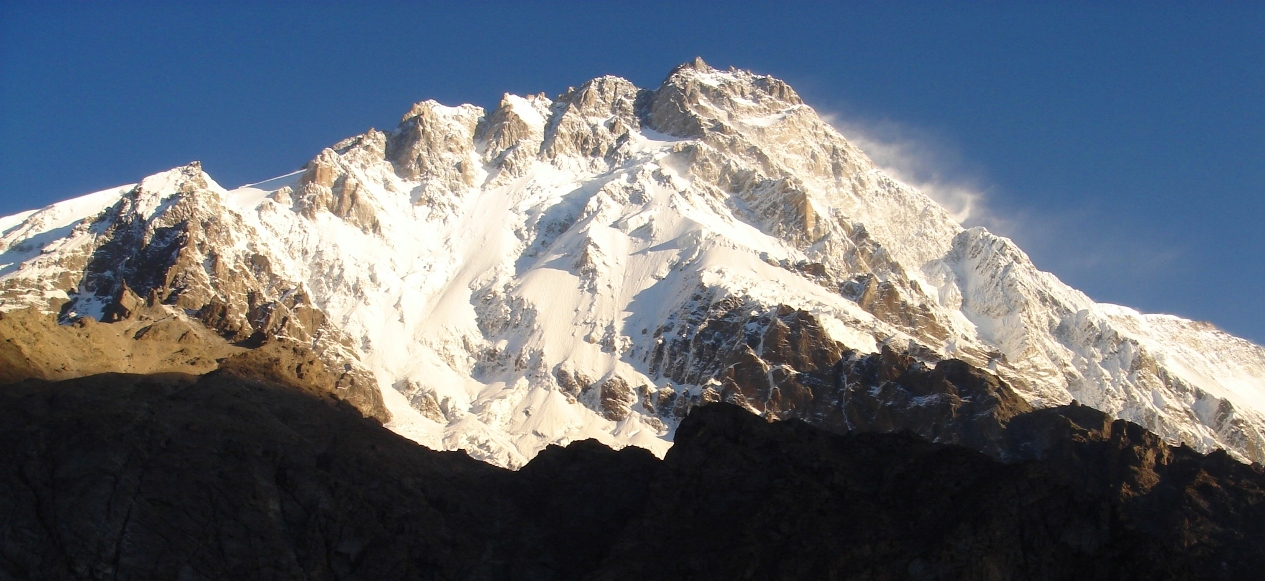
Southwest aspect of the Rupal Face

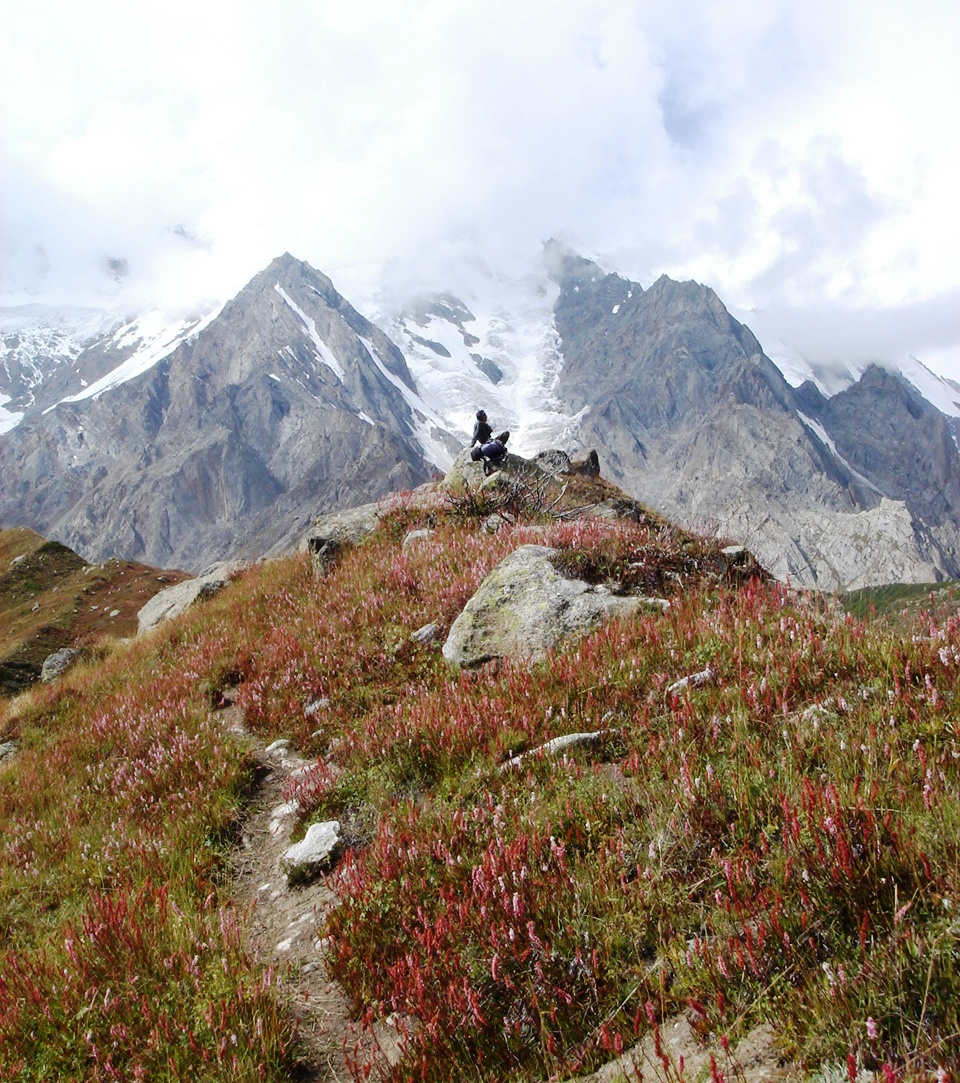
At 4,100 m (13,450 ft), near the Rakhiot Base Camp

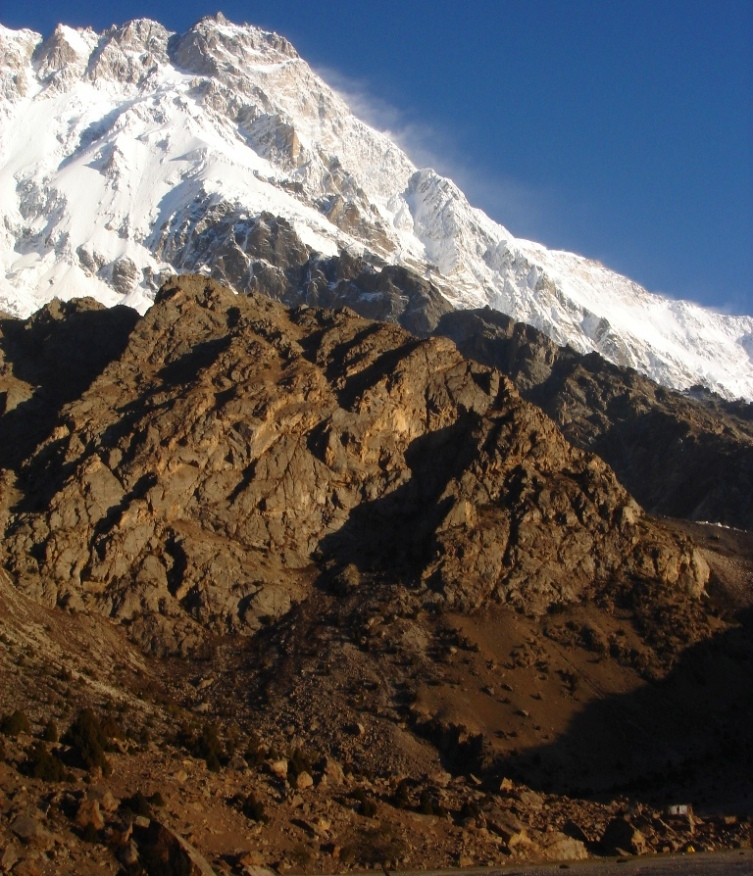
View from Latbo village. For a sense of scale, notice a four-man yellow tent, dwarfed by the peak, near the bottom right. Just above the tent is a large white building.

Nanga Parbat was first climbed, via the Rakhiot Flank (East Ridge), on July 3, 1953, by Austrian climber Hermann Buhl on the German–Austrian Nanga Parbat expedition, a member of a German-Austrian team. The expedition was organized by the half-brother of Willy Merkl, Karl Herrligkoffer from Munich, while the expedition leader was Peter Aschenbrenner from Kufstein, who had participated in the 1932 and 1934 attempts. At the time of this expedition, 31 people had already died on the mountain.

The final push for the summit was dramatic: Buhl continued alone for the final 1,300 metres (4,300 ft), after his companions had turned back. Under the influence of the drug pervitin (based on the stimulant methamphetamine used by soldiers during World War II), padutin, and tea from coca leaves, he reached the summit dangerously late, at 7:00 p.m., the climbing harder and more time-consuming than he had anticipated. His descent was slowed when he lost a crampon. Caught by darkness, he was forced to bivouac standing upright on a narrow ledge, holding a small handhold with one hand. Exhausted, he dozed occasionally but managed to maintain his balance. He finally reached his high camp at 7:00 p.m. the next day, 40 hours after setting out. The ascent was made without oxygen, and Buhl is the only man to have made the first ascent of an 8,000-metre (26,000 ft) peak alone.

The 1953 documentary film Nanga Parbat 1953 was filmed and directed by Hans Ertl, who participated in the expedition. Buhl's climb was also later dramatized by Canadian film director Donald Shebib in the 1986 film The Climb.

=== Subsequent attempts and ascents ===
The second ascent of Nanga Parbat was via the Diamir Face, in 1962, by Germans Toni Kinshofer, Siegfried Löw, and A. Mannhardt. This route has become the "standard route" on the mountain. The Kinshofer route does not ascend the middle of the Diamir Face, which is threatened by avalanches from large hanging glaciers. Instead it climbs a buttress on the left side of the Diamir Face. In 1970, brothers Günther and Reinhold Messner made the third ascent of the mountain and the first ascent of the Rupal Face. They were unable to descend by their original route, and instead descended by the Diamir Face, making the first traverse of the mountain. Günther was killed in an avalanche on the Diamir Face, where his remains were found in 2005.

In 1971, Slovak mountaineers Ivan Fiala and Michal Orolin summited Nanga Parbat via Buhl's 1953 route while other expedition members climbed the southeast peak (7,600 m or 24,900 ft) above the Silbersattel and the foresummit (7,850 m or 25,750 ft) above the Bazhin Gap. In 1976 a team of four made the sixth summit via a new route on the Rupal Face (second ascent on this face), then named the Schell route after the Austrian team leader. The line had been plotted by Karl Herrligkoffer on a previous unsuccessful attempt. In 1978, Reinhold Messner returned to the Diamir Face and achieved the first completely solo ascent of an 8,000-metre (26,000 ft) peak.

In 1984, the French climber Lilliane Barrard became the first woman to climb Nanga Parbat, along with her husband Maurice Barrard. In 1985, Jerzy Kukuczka, Zygmunt Heinrich, Slawomir Lobodzinski (all Polish), and Carlos Carsolio (Mexico) climbed up the Southeast Pillar (or Polish Spur) on the right-hand side of the Rupal Face, reaching the summit July 13. It was Kukuczka's ninth 8,000-metre (26,000 ft) summit. Also in 1985, a Polish women's team climbed the peak via the 1962 German Diamir Face route. Wanda Rutkiewicz, Krystyna Palmowska, and Anna Czerwinska reached the summit on July 15.

"Modern" superalpinism was brought to Nanga Parbat in 1988 with an unsuccessful attempt or two on the Rupal Face by Barry Blanchard, Mark Twight, Ward Robinson, and Kevin Doyle. 2005 saw a resurgence of lightweight, alpine-style attempts on the Rupal Face.

- In August 2005, Pakistani military helicopters rescued Slovenian mountaineer Tomaž Humar, who was stuck under a narrow ice ledge at 5,900 m (19,400 ft) for six days. It is believed to be one of the few successful rescues carried out at such high altitude.
- In September 2005, Vince Anderson and Steve House did an extremely lightweight, fast ascent of a new, direct route on the face, earning high praise from the climbing community.
- On July 17 or 18, 2006, José Antonio Delgado from Venezuela died a few days after reaching the summit, where he was caught by bad weather for six days and was unable to make his way down. He is the only Venezuelan climber, and one of few Latin Americans, to have reached the summit of five eight-thousanders. Part of the expedition and the rescue efforts at base camp were captured on video, as Delgado was the subject of a pilot for a mountaineering television series. Explorart Films, the production company, later developed the project into a feature documentary film called Beyond the Summit, which was scheduled to be released in South America in January 2008.
- On July 15, 2008, Italian alpinist Karl Unterkircher fell into a crevasse during an attempt to open a new route to the top with Walter Nones and Simon Kehrer. Unterkircher died, but Kehrer and Nones were rescued by the Pakistani Army.
- On July 12, 2009, after reaching the summit, South Korean climber Go Mi-Young fell off a cliff on the descent in bad weather in her race to be the first woman to climb all 14 eight-thousanders.
- On July 15, 2012, Scottish mountaineers Sandy Allan and Rick Allen made the first ascent of Nanga Parbat via the 10-kilometre-long (6 mi) Mazeno Ridge. They reached the base camp on the Diamir flank of the mountain after an 18 day period of continuous climbing. In April 2013 were awarded the Piolet d'Or for their achievement.
- On July 10, 2024, Vadim Druelle set a record speed ascent of Nanga Parbat from base camp to summit in 15 hours and 18 minutes without the use of supplemental oxygen.

=== Winter climbing ===
Nanga Parbat was first successfully climbed in winter on February 26, 2016, by a team consisting of Ali Sadpara, Alex Txikon, and Simone Moro.

The second winter ascent was made by the Polish climber Tomasz Mackiewicz and Frenchwoman Élisabeth Revol on January 25, 2018.

Previous attempts of winter climbing:

- 1988/89 – Polish 12-member expedition KW Zakopane under the leadership of Maciej Berbeka. They first attempted the Rupal Face and then the Diamir Face. On the Messner route, Maciej Berbeka, Piotr Konopka, and Andrzej Osika reached an elevation of about 6500–6800 m.
- 1990/91 – Polish-English expedition under the leadership of Maciej Berbeka reached the height of 6600m on the Messner route, and then Andrzej Osika and John Tinker by the Schell route up the Rupal Face reached a height of 6600 m.
- 1991/92 – Polish expedition KW Zakopane under the leadership of Maciej Berbeka from the Rupal valley. This attack in alpine style on the Schell route reached the height of 7000 m.
- 1992/93 – French expedition Eric Monier and Monique Loscos – Schell route on the Rupal Face. They came to BC on December 20. Eric reached 6500 m on January 9 and on January 13 the expedition was abandoned.
- 1996/97 – two expeditions:
  - Polish expedition led by Andrzej Zawada from the Diamir valley, Kinshofer route. During the summit attempt by the team of Zbigniew Trzmiel and Krzysztof Pankiewicz, Trzmiel reached a height of 7800 m. The assault was interrupted because of frostbite. After descending to the base camp, both climbers were evacuated by helicopter to a hospital.
  - British expedition led by Victor Saunders, taking the Kinshofer route on the Diamir Face. Victor Saunders, Dane Rafael Jensen, and Pakistani Ghulam Hassan reached the height of 6000 m.
- 1997/98 – Polish expedition led by Andrzej Zawada from the Diamir valley, Kinshofer route. Expedition reached the height of 6800 m, encountered an unusually heavy snowfall. A falling stone broke Ryszard Pawłowski's leg.
- 2004/05 – Austrian expedition by brothers Wolfgang and Gerfried Göschl via the Kinshofer route on the Diamir Face reached the height of 6500 m.
- 2006/07 – Polish HiMountain expedition on the Schell route on the Rupal Face. Expedition led by Krzysztof Wielicki, with Jan Szulc, Artur Hajzer, Dariusz Załuski, Jacek Jawień, Jacek Berbeka, Przemysław Łoziński, and Robert Szymczak reached a height of 7000 m.
- 2007/08 – Italian Simone La Terra with Pakistani Meherban Karim started climbing solo at the beginning of December, reaching a height of 6000 m.
- 2008/09 – Polish expedition on the Diamir side. Jacek Teler (leader) and Jarosław Żurawski. Deep snow prevented them from hauling their equipment to the base of the face, forcing the base camp to be placed five kilometres earlier. Camp I set at an altitude of 5400 m.
- 2010/11 – two expeditions:
  - Sergei Nikolayevich Cygankow in a solo expedition on the Kinshofer route on the Diamir Face reached 6000 m. He developed pulmonary edema and ended the expedition.
  - Tomasz Mackiewicz and Marek Klonowski – Polish expedition "Justice for All – Nanga Dream" by Kinshofer route on the Diamir side reached 5100 m. https://www.explorersweb.com/polar/news.php?id=16779
- 2011/12 – three expeditions:
  - Tomasz Mackiewicz, Marek Klonowski and "Krzaq" – Polish expedition "Justice for All – Nanga Dream" by Kinshofer route on the Diamir side reached 5500 m.
  - Denis Urubko and Simone Moro first Diamir side on the Kinshofer route, and then by Messner route in year 2000 reached a height of 6800 m.
- 2012/13 – four expeditions:
  - Frenchman Joël Wischnewski solo on the Rupal Face in an alpine style. He was lost in February and his body was found in September at an altitude of about 6100 m. He went missing after February 6 and was probably hit by an avalanche.
  - Italy's Daniele Nardi and French Elisabeth Revol – Mummery Rib on the Diamir reached the height of 6450 m.
  - Hungarian-American expedition: David Klein, Zoltan Acs and Ian Overton. Zoltan suffered frostbite while reaching the base and did not participate in the further ascent. David and Ian reached the height of about 5400 m on the Diamir Face.
  - Tomasz Mackiewicz and Marek Klonowski – Polish expedition "Justice for All – Nanga Dream" by Schell route on the Rupal Face. Marek Klonowski reached a height of 6600 m. On February 7, 2013, Mackiewicz in a lone attack reached a height of 7400 m.
- 2013/14 – four expeditions:
  - Italian Simone Moro, German David Göttler, and Italian Emilio Previtali – Schell route on the Rupal Face. This expedition cooperated with the Polish expedition. David Göttler, on February 28, set Camp IV at about 7000 m. On March 1, he and Tomasz Mackiewicz reached an altitude of about 7200 m. On the same day David and Simone decided to end the expedition.
  - Tomasz Mackiewicz, Marek Klonowski, Jacek Teler, Paweł Dunaj, Michał Obrycki, Michał Dzikowski – Polish expedition "Justice for All – Nanga Dream" by Schell route on the Rupal Face. Expedition cooperated with Italian-German expedition. March 1, Tomasz Mackiewicz and David Göttler reached an altitude of about 7200 m. On March 8, at a height of about 5000 m, Paweł Dunaj and Michał Obrycki were hit by an avalanche. Both were roughed up and suffered fractures. The rescue operation was successful.
  - German Ralf Dujmovits on the Diamir Face, by Reinhold Messner's route from 1978. They were accompanied by Pole Dariusz Załuski as a filmmaker – he had no plan of summit attack. On December 30, both reached 5500 m. On January 2, because of the serac threat, Dujmovits decided to abandon the expedition.
  - Italy's Daniele Nardi made a solo expedition from the Diamir side on Mummery Rib. He set Camp I at 4900 m and reached an altitude of about 5450 m. On March 1 he decided to end the expedition.
- 2014/15 – five expeditions:
  - Pole Tomasz Mackiewicz and Frenchwoman Élisabeth Revol – Nanga Parbat Winter Expedition 2014/2015. They climbed the north-west Diamir Face, using an unfinished route by Messner-Hanspeter 2000. They reached 7800 m.
  - Italian Daniele Nardi climbed Mummery Rib on the Diamir Face, accompanied by Roberto Delle Monache (photographer) and Federico Santinii (filmmaker).
  - A four-member Russian expedition – Nikolay Totmjanin, Sergei Kondraszkin, Valery Szamało, Victor Smith – climbed the Schell route on the Rupal Face. They reached 7150 m.
  - A three-person expedition from Iran – Reza Bahador, Iraj Maani, and Mahmoud Hashemi.
- 2015/16 – five expeditions:
  - Nanga Light 2015/16 with Tomasz Mackiewicz, Élisabeth Revol, and Arsalan Ahmed Ansari. On January 22, Mackiewicz and Revol reached 7500 m, but they were forced to cancel their attempt for the summit due to excessive cold.
  - Nanga Stegu Revolution 2015/16 with Adam Bielecki and Jacek Czech. After an accident, Bielecki's injuries after a fall forced the team down.
  - "Nanga Dream – Justice for All" – under the lead of Marek Klonowski with Paweł Dunaj, Paweł Witkowski, Tomasz Dziobkowski, Michał Dzikowski, Paweł Kudła, Piotr Tomza, Karim Hayat, and Safdar Karim.
  - International team consisting of Alex Txikon, Daniele Nardi, and Ali Sadpara.
  - Italian team consisting of Simone Moro and Tamara Lunger.
  - The two above mentioned teams (with the exception of Daniele Nardi) joined their efforts and on February 26, 2016, Italian Simone Moro, Basque Alex Txikon, and Ali Sadpara reached the summit, marking the first winter ascent of Nanga Parbat, while Tamara Lunger stopped short of the summit due to nausea and extreme cold; giving an interview to Noor abbas Qureshi, she told that she tried her best, but her health did not allow her to reach the summit.
- 2017/18 - one expedition:
  - Tomasz Mackiewicz from Poland and Élisabeth Revol from France. They ascended the summit on January 25, 2018, from the Diamer face. Mackiewicz got severe frostbite on his hands, feet, and face, snow blindness, and altitude sickness. Revol got frostbite on her hands and feet but to a lesser extent. A Polish team attempting K2 was called for rescue. Denis Urubko and Adam Bielecki rescued Revol at 6,026 m (19,770 ft), while Mackiewicz stayed at around 7,300 m (24,000 ft). Rescuers did not go back for Mackiewicz due to bad weather and a possible snow storm. On January 28, Revol was carried to Islamabad for treatment and on the evening of January 30 she was in a hospital in Sallanches.
- 2018/19 – one expedition:
  - Daniele Nardi and Tom Ballard (son of Alison Hargreaves). On February 26, 2019, the team went missing. Their bodies were discovered on the mountain, on March 9, 2019, after a lengthy search.

=== Taliban attack ===
On June 23, 2013, about 15 extremist militants wearing Gilgit Scouts uniforms shot and killed ten foreign climbers (one Lithuanian, three Ukrainians, two Slovaks, two Chinese, one Chinese-American, and one Nepali) and one Pakistani guide at Base Camp. Another foreign victim was injured. The attack occurred at around 1 AM and was claimed by a local branch of the Taliban (Tehrik-i-Taliban Pakistan).

== Appearances in literature and film ==
In the first chapter of Mistress of Mistresses, by E.R. Eddison, the narrator compares his then-deceased compatriot, Lessingham, to Nanga Parbat in a descriptive passage:

"I remember, years later, his describing to me the effect of the sudden view you get of Nanga Parbat from one of those Kashmir valleys; you have been riding for hours among quiet richly wooded scenery, winding up along the side of some kind of gorge, with nothing very big to look at, just lush, leafy, pussy-cat country of steep hillsides and waterfalls; then suddenly you come round a corner where the view opens up the valley, and you are almost struck senseless by the blinding splendour of that vast face of ice-hung precipices and soaring ridges, sixteen thousand feet from top to toe, filling a whole quarter of the heavens at a distance of, I suppose, only a dozen miles. And now, whenever I call to mind my first sight of Lessingham in that little daleside church so many years ago, I think of Nanga Parbat." (Mistress of Mistresses, 1935, p.2-3)

Jonathan Neale wrote a book about the 1934 climbing season on Nanga Parbat called Tigers of the Snow. He interviewed many old Sherpas, including Ang Tsering, the last man off Nanga Parbat alive in 1934. The book attempts to narrate what went wrong on the expedition, set against the mountaineering history of the early twentieth century, the background of German politics in the 1930s, and the hardship and passion of life in the Sherpa valleys.

The 1953 documentary Nanga Parbat 1953 was filmed and directed by cinematographer Hans Ertl, who participated in the expedition and climbed to camp 5 (6500m). Nanga Parbat is a movie by Joseph Vilsmaier about the 1970 expedition of brothers Günther Messner and Reinhold Messner. Donald Shebib's 1986 film The Climb covers the story of Hermann Buhl making the first ascent. A 2021 documentary records the background for the 2019 Nardi/Ballard attempt.

Jean-Jacques Annaud's 1997 film Seven Years in Tibet opens with Heinrich Harrer's obsession to climb Nanga Parbat at the beginning of World War II.

A song Brothers on Diamir by Austrian band Edenbridge is based on the Messner brothers' ascent of Nanga Parbat.

Nanda Parbat, a fictional city in the DC Universe, is named after the mountain.

In the 2017 TV series Dark, a German character mentions that "Nanga Parbat has been conquered" when explaining that the current year is 1953.

== Nearby peaks ==
- Rakhiot Peak
- Chongra Peak
- Mazeno Peak
- Rupal Peak
- Laila Peak (Rupal Valley)
- Shaigiri

== See also ==
- List of deaths on Nanga Parbat
- Geology of the Himalaya
- Karakoram fault system - major active fault system within the Himalayas
- Namcha Barwa - eastern anchor of the Himalayas
- List of highest mountains on Earth
- Rupal Valley
- Astore Valley

== Sources ==
- The German obsession with Nanga Parbat – War Life | Nathan Morley
- Mason, Kenneth (1987) [1955 published by Rupert Hart-Davis]. Abode of Snow: A History of Himalayan Exploration and Mountaineering From Earliest Times to the Ascent of Everest. Diadem Books. ISBN 978-0-906371-91-6.
- Neale, Jonathan (2002). Tigers of the Snow. St Martin's Press. ISBN 0-312-26623-5.
- Sale, Richard; Cleare, John (2000). Climbing the World's 14 Highest Mountains: The History of the 8,000-Meter Peaks. Seattle: Mountaineers Books. ISBN 978-0-89886-727-5.
- Simpson, Joe (1997). Dark Shadows Falling. London: Jonathan Cape. ISBN 0-224-04368-4.
- Herrligkoffer, Karl M (1954). Nanga Parbat. Elek.
- Irving, R. L. G., Ten Great Mountains (London, J. M. Dent & Sons, 1940)
- Ahmed Hasan Dani, Chilas: The City of Nanga Parvat (Dyamar). 1983. ASIN B0000CQDB2
- Alpenvereinskarte "Nanga Parbat", 1:50,000, Deutsche Himalaya Expedition 1934.
- Andy Fanshawe and Stephen Venables, Himalaya Alpine-Style, Hodder and Stoughton, 1995.
- Audrey Salkeld (editor), World Mountaineering, Bulfinch, 1998.
- American Alpine Journal
- Himalayan Index Archived 2017-07-17 at the Wayback Machine
- DEM files for the Himalaya (Corrected versions of SRTM data)
- Guardian International story on Gunther Messner
- Climbing magazine, April 2006.
