= Ryszard Pawłowski =

Polish mountain climber (born 1950)

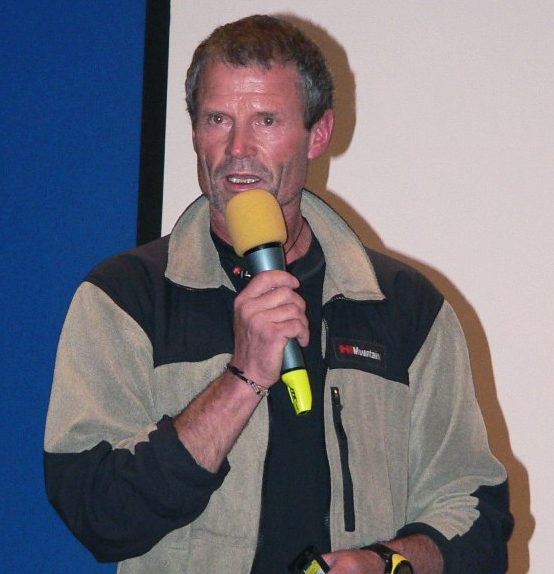
Ryszard Pawłowski in Silesian Library in Katowice

Ryszard Pawłowski (24 June 1950 in Bogatynia) is a Polish alpinist, high-altitude mountaineer, and photographer and climbing author. He is a member of The Explorers Club and the founder of the Patagonia Mountain Agency. He has been climbing since 1970 and is an alpine climbing instructor and mountain guide. He has summited Mount Everest five times (13 May 1994, 12 May 1995, 18 May 1999, 20 May 2012 and 25 May 2014), and has summited ten of the fourteen eight-thousander peaks, including K2.

== Ascents of eight–thousander peaks ==
- 14 July 1984 – Broad Peak (classic route)
- 22 October 1991 – Annapurna (Bonington route)
- 24 August 1993 – Nanga Parbat (Kinshofer route)
- 13 May 1994 – Mount Everest (classic route)
- 11 October 1994 – Lhotse (classic route)
- 12 May 1995 – Mount Everest (northern route)
- 14 August 1996 – K2 (north pillar)
- 15 July 1997 – Gasherbrum I (classic route)
- 20 July 1997 – Gasherbrum II (classic route)
- 18 May 1999 – Mount Everest (northern route)
- 4 October 2000 – Cho Oyu
- 1 October 2001 – Shisha Pangma Middle
- 26 July 2003 – Gasherbrum II
- 3 May 2005 – Cho Oyu
- 23 July 2006 – Gasherbrum II
- 20 May 2012 – Mount Everest
- 25 May 2014 – Mount Everest
- 27 September 2017 – Manaslu

== Other ascents ==
- 1977 – Kohe Tez, Kohe Shan
- 1981 – Ismail Samani Peak
- 1982 – Langtang Lirung
- 1983 – Pumori
- 1987 – Ushba
- 1988 – Fitz Roy
- 1992 – Ama Dablam
- 1997 – Torres del Paine

As a mountain guide:

- Ama Dablam – 28 times,
- Aconcagua – 34 times,
- Mount McKinley – 10 times,
- Island Peak – 40 times,
- Pumori – 2 times.

== See also ==
- List of Mount Everest summiteers by frequency
