= Iraj Nazeri =

Iranian cardiologist and professor

- Born: 1939 (age 86–87); Kermanshah, Iran
- Education: Tehran University of Medical Sciences; The Texas Heart Institute
- Medical career
- Profession: M.D.
- Field: Cardiology

Iraj Nazeri is an Iranian cardiologist and professor at Tehran University of Medical Sciences. He performed the first coronary angioplasty in Iran.

== History ==
Nazeri was born in Kermanshah, Iran in 1939. He attended Khosro Parviz elementary school and Razi High School in Kermanshah where he graduated in 1957. He has a Doctor of Medicine (M.D.) degree from Tehran University of Medical Sciences where he completed his subspecialty training in adult cardiovascular disease. Nazeri had postgraduate training at the Texas Heart Institute in Houston, Texas majoring in interventional cardiology and advanced cardiovascular treatment techniques.

In 1987 Nazeri performed the first coronary angioplasty in Iran. He continued to develop the interventional techniques and treatments for coronary artery diseases, structural heart diseases and peripheral vascular diseases in Iran.

== Legacy ==
Nazeri was named the head of cardiology department at Imam Hospital and Medical Center at the University of Tehran. As professor at Tehran University of Medical Sciences, Nazeri established the first interventional cardiology training program in Iran.
