= Iraj Zebardast =

Iranian poet

Iraj Zebardast ايرج زبردست
- Born: Shiraz, Fars, Iran
- Occupation: Poet

Iraj Zebardast (Persian: ایرج زبردست), is an Iranian poet mostly known for his quatrains. He was born in Shiraz.

== Works ==
- Everyone's in love when it rains
- Wet Smiles
- A basket of mirrors
- Another life of passing day
- My letters to Oma

== Books about Iraj Zebardast ==
- Maryam Roshan, Another Khayyám ... Selection of Iraj Zebardast's works
- Most disturbing songs – Quatrains from the age of Khayyám until the age of Zebardast

== See also ==
- Omar Khayyám
