= Thapa Peak =

Mountain in Nepal

- Dhampus
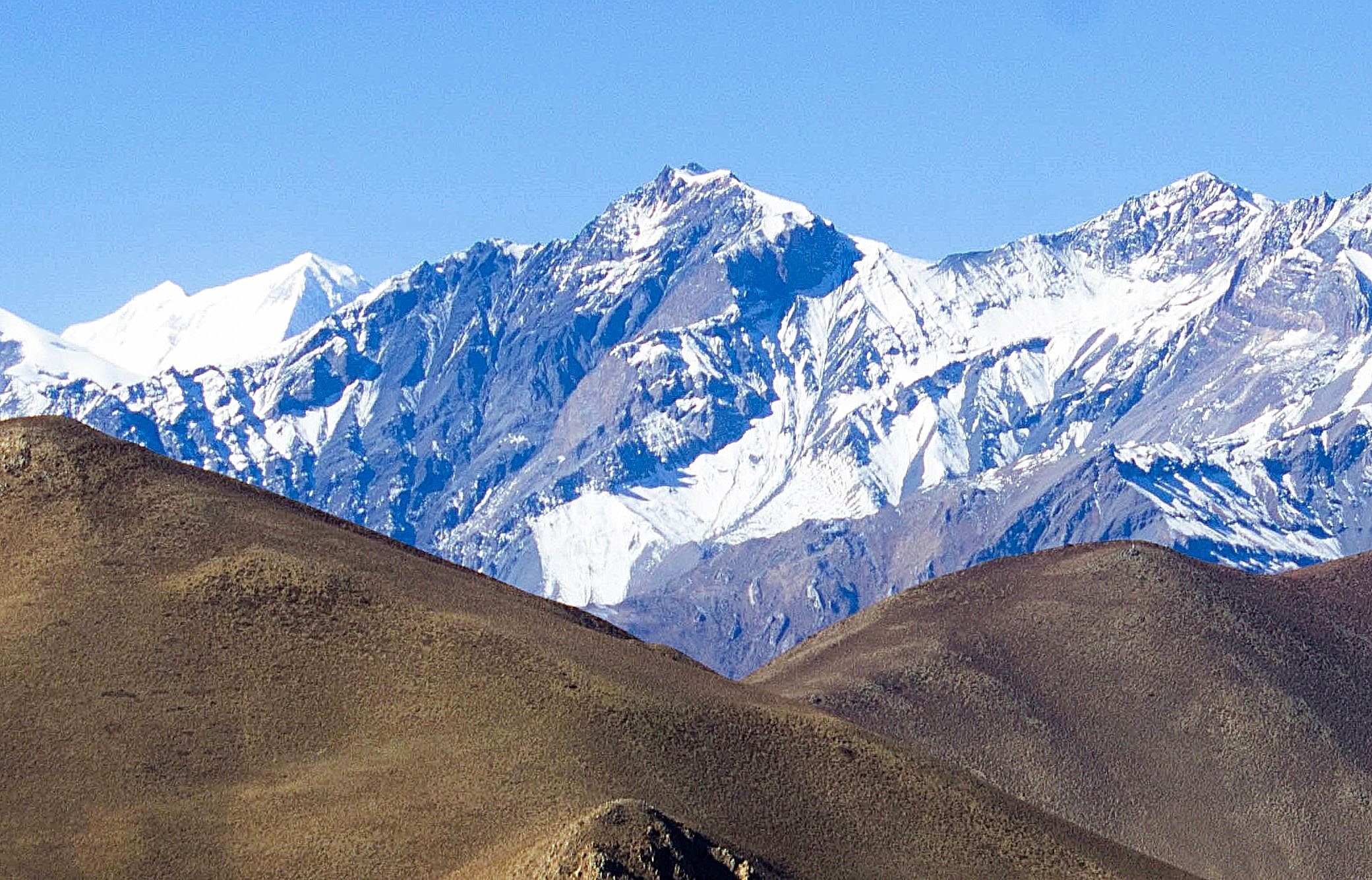
- East aspect

Highest point
- Elevation: 6,012 m (19,724 ft)
- Prominence: 522 m (1,713 ft)
- Parent peak: Tashi Kang
- Isolation: 5.03 km (3.13 mi)
- Coordinates: 28°47′53″N 83°36′43″E

Geography
- Location within Nepal
- Interactive map of Thapa Peak
- Country: Nepal
- Province: Gandaki
- District: Mustang
- Protected area: Annapurna Conservation Area
- Parent range: Himalayas; Dhaulagiri

Climbing
- First ascent: 1960 Kurt Diemberger

Thapa Peak, also known as Dhampus or Dhampus Peak, is a mountain in Nepal.

== Description ==
Thapa Peak is a 6,012-metre (19,724-foot) summit in the Nepalese Himalayas. It is situated 12 kilometres (7.5 mi) west of Jomsom in Gandaki Province and the Annapurna Conservation Area. Precipitation runoff from the mountain's slopes drains into tributaries of the Kali Gandaki. Topographic relief is significant as the summit rises 3,300 metres (10,828 ft) above the Kali Gandaki Gorge in nine kilometres (5.6 mi). The first ascent of the summit was made in April 1960 by Kurt Diemberger. The first officially permitted ascent was made on October 28, 2002, by a team of French climbers led by Raphael Guilbert via the west slopes.

== Climate ==
Based on the Köppen climate classification, Thapa Peak is located in a tundra climate zone with cold, snowy winters, and cool summers. Weather systems are forced upwards by the Himalaya mountains (orographic lift), causing heavy precipitation in the form of rainfall and snowfall. Mid-June through early-August is the monsoon season. The months of March, April, May, October, and November offer the most favorable weather for viewing or climbing this peak.

== See also ==
- Geology of the Himalayas
