= Iraj Mikaeilzadeh =

Iranian volleyball player

Personal information
- Born: Urmia, Iran

Volleyball information
- Position: Libero
- Current club: (Iran) Shardari Urmia
- Number: 13

Career
Teams
	(Iran) Shahrdari Urmia

Iraj Mikaeilzadeh (Persian: ایرج میکائیل زاده, born in Urmia, West Azerbaijan) is a volleyball player from Iran, who plays as a libero for Shahrdari Urmia VC in Iranian Volleyball Super League.
