= Tilicho Peak =

Mountain in Nepal

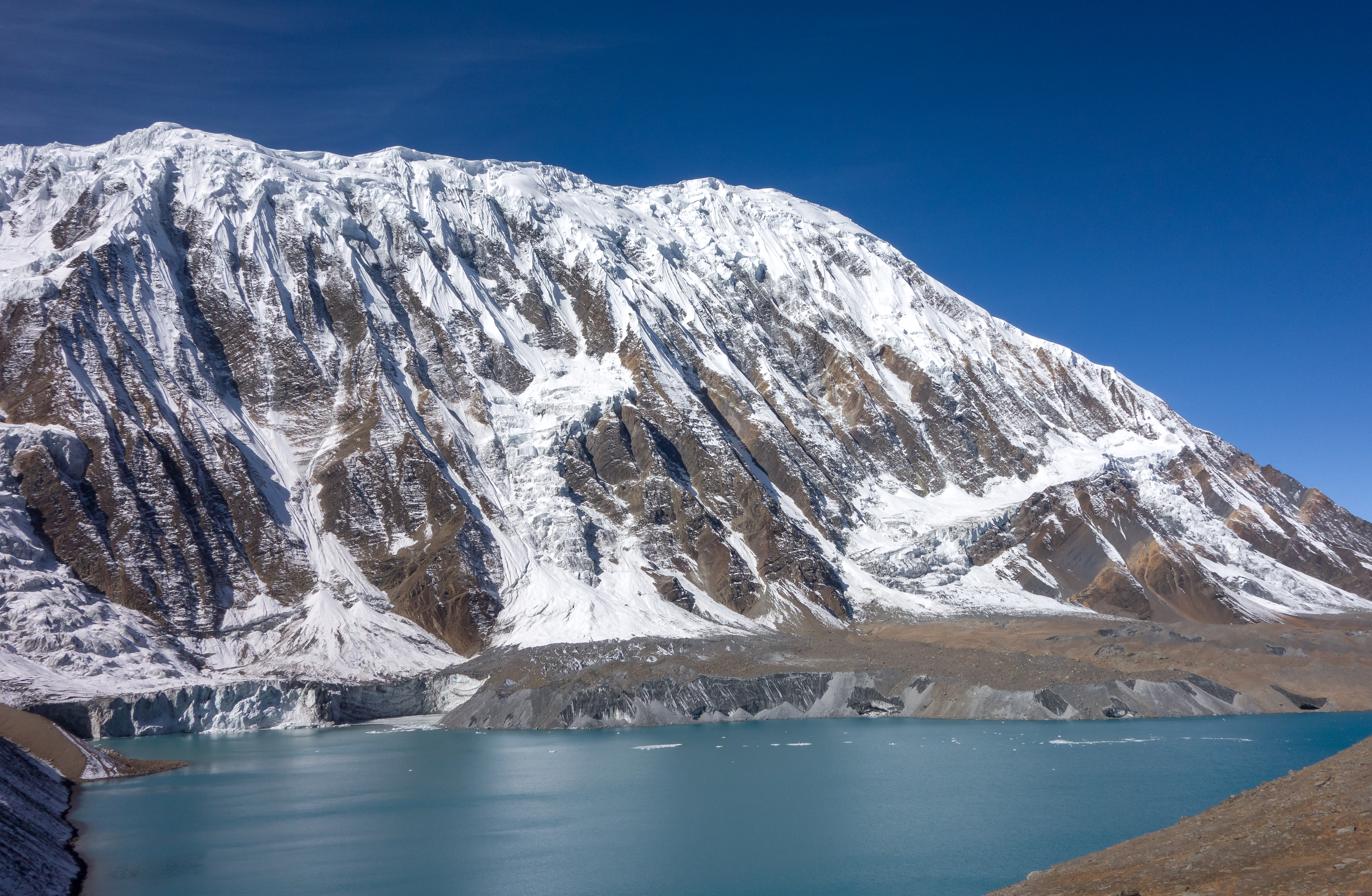
- Tilicho Peak

Highest point
- Elevation: 7,134 m (23,406 ft)
- Prominence: 710 m (2,330 ft)
- Coordinates: 28°41′04″N 83°48′16″E

Geography
- Location within Nepal
- Country: Nepal
- Parent range: Himalayas

Climbing
- First ascent: 1978 by Emanuel Schmutz
- Easiest route: glacier/snow

Tilicho Peak is a mountain in the Nepalese Himalayas, near Annapurna. The peak was first seen by Europeans in 1950 by members of the 1950 French Annapurna expedition led by Maurice Herzog who were attempting to find Annapurna I.

Lake Tilicho is located on the northern side of the peak.

The first ascent was made in 1978 by the French climber Emanuel Schmutz using the northwest shoulder. In 1982 a winter ascent was made by Ang Serky, Dawa Gyalzen and Serky Tshering in what anthropologist Sherry Ortner believes to be the first all-Sherpa mountaineering expedition.

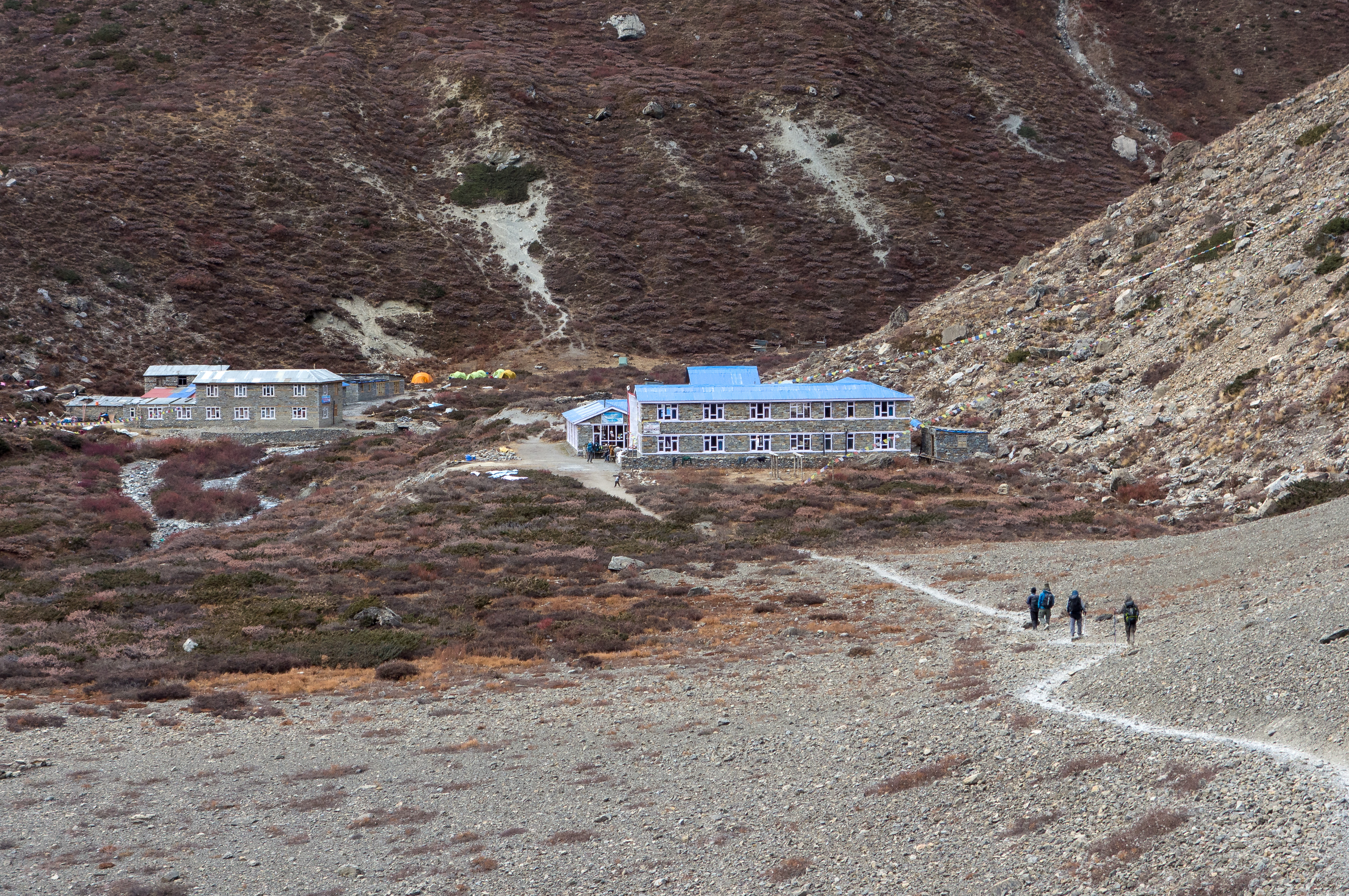
Tilicho Base Camp

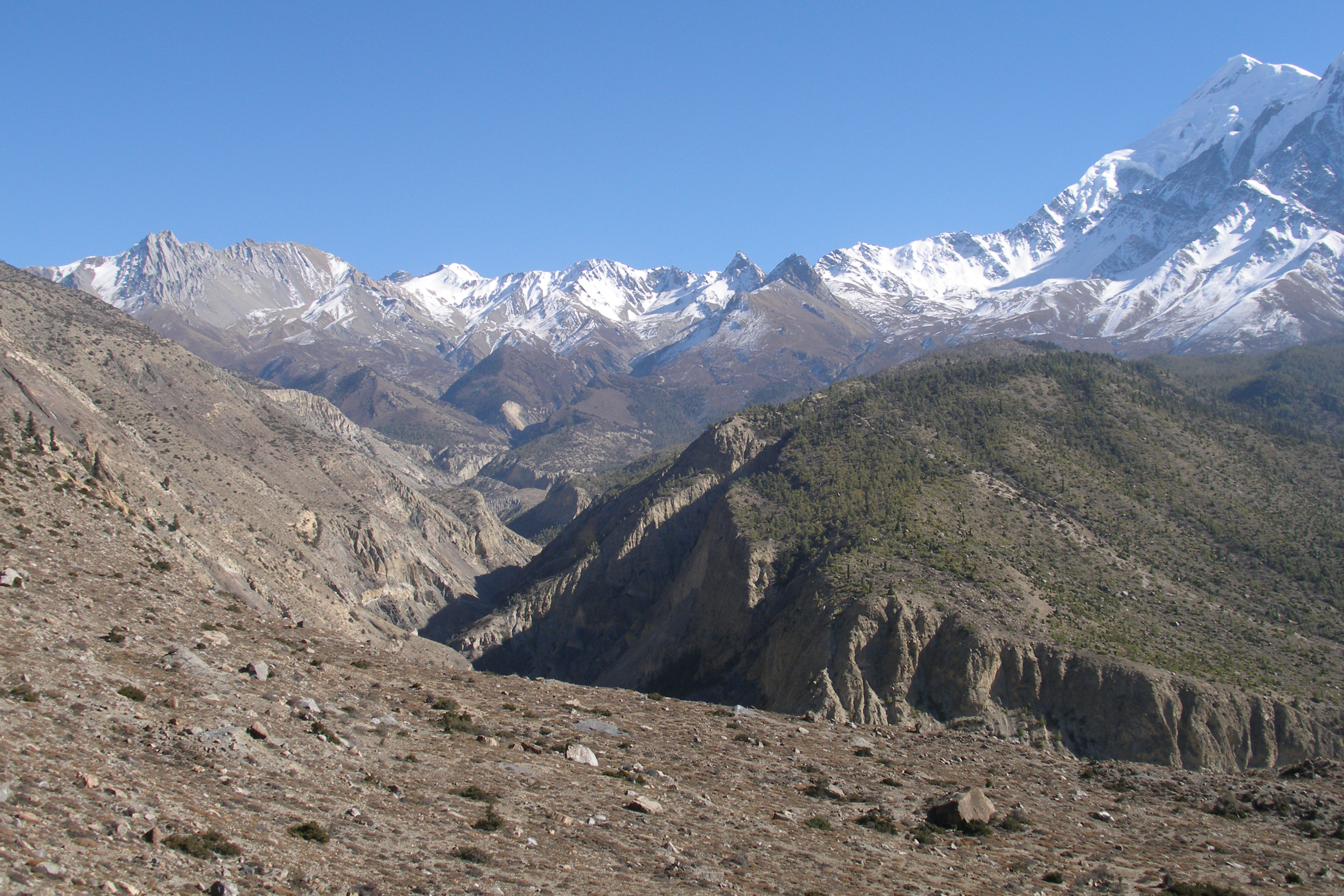
Tilicho Himal from Jomsom Valley
