= Rupal =

Rupal may refer to:

== Places ==
=== Pakistan ===
- Rupal, Gilgit–Baltistan, a village in Rupal Valley
- Rupal Glacier
- Rupal Peak
- Rupal River
- Rupal Valley
- Rupal, Punjab, a village

=== Elsewhere ===
- Rupal, Gandhinagar, Gujarat, India
- Rupal State, a former princely state in Mahi Kantha, Gujarat, India
- Rupal, Nepal

== People ==
- Rupal Patel, Indian actress
- Rupal Patel, Canadian speech scientist

== See also ==
- RuPaul (born 1960), American performer
