= Rupal, Gilgit–Baltistan =

Village in Pakistan

Coordinates: 35°13′38.76″N 74°42′26.60″E

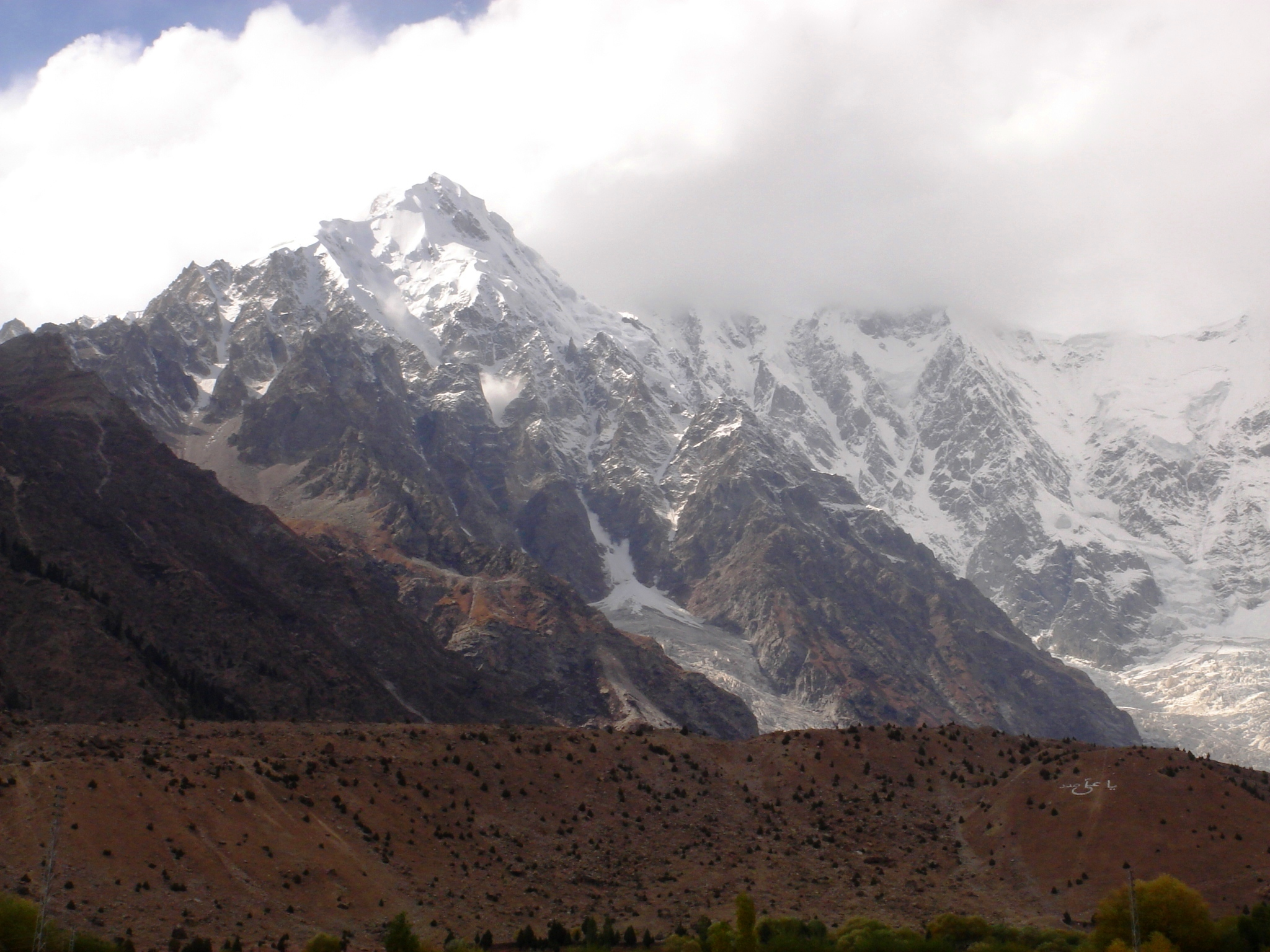
The eastern expanse of Nanga Parbat above Rupal village.

Rupal (Urdu: روپل) is a village in the Rupal Valley of the Astore District in Gilgit-Baltistan, Pakistan. It lies to the south of Tarashing village on the west end of Tarashing Glacier. Nanga Parbat and Rakhiot Peak lie northwest of the village and Chongra Peak (another peak of the Nanga Parbat massif) lies to the north.

== See also ==
- Rupal Valley
- Rupal Peak
- Astore Valley
