= List of rivers of Pakistan =

Rivers in Pakistan (Asia)

This is a list of rivers wholly or partly in Pakistan, organised geographically by river basin, from west to east. Tributaries are listed from the mouth to the source. The longest and the largest river in Pakistan is the Indus River. Around two-thirds of water supplied for irrigation and in homes come from the Indus and its associated rivers.

== Flowing into the Arabian Sea ==
Some of these rivers flow only during the rainy season, so for part of the year the water may not reach the mouth of the river.

- Dasht River (Urdu: دریائے دشت)
  - Kech River
- Basol River
- Hingol River (Urdu: دریائے ہنگول)
  - Nal River
- Porali River
- Hub River (Urdu: دریائے حب)
- Orangi Nala
- Malir River (Urdu:دریائے ملير )
- Lyari River (Urdu:لیاری ندی)(no more river only drain now)
  - Gujjar Nala(no more river only drain now)

=== Indus River basin ===
- Indus River
  - Panjnad River (Urdu: پنجند)
    - Chenab River
      - Ravi River
        - Jhelum River
        - Poonch River
        - Kunhar River
        - Neelum River or Kishanganga
      - Tawi River
      - Manawar Tawi River
    - Sutlej River
  - Gomal River
    - Kundar River
    - Zhob River
  - Kurrama River (Urdu: دریائے کرم )
    - Tochi River, sometimes referred to as the Gambila River
  - Soan River (Urdu: دریائے سون)
    - Ling stream
  - Haro River
  - Kabul River
    - Swat River
      - River Jindi
      - Panjkora River
    - Bara River
    - Kunar River (Kunar Rud)
      - Lutkho River
  - Siran River
  - Tangir River:

Tributary river of River Indus; flows from Tangir Valley District Diamer down to the river Indus with Karakuram Highway.

  - Astore River
    - Rupal River, rising from the melt water of the Rupal Glacier
  - Gilgit River
    - Hunza River
      - Naltar River
      - Hispar River
      - Shimshal River
      - Chapursan River
      - Misgar River
      - Khunjerab River
    - Ishkuman River
    - Yasin River
  - Satpara Stream
  - Shigar River (Urdu: دریائے شگر ), formed from the melting water of the Baltoro Glacier and Biafo Glacier.
    - Braldu River
  - Shyok River
    - Saltoro River
    - Hushe River
    - Nubra River, rising from the meltwater of the Siachen Glacier
  - Suru River
    - Dras River
    - Shingo River

== Flowing into endorheic basins ==
=== Hamun-i-Mashkel ===
- Mashkel River
  - Rakshan River

=== Sistan Basin ===
- Helmand River (Iran/Afghanistan)
  - Arghandab River (Afghanistan)
    - Lora River or Dori River

=== Indus Plains ===
- Nari River
  - Mula River
  - Bolan River
  - Beji River
    - Anambar River
      - Loralai River
  - Loe Manda River

=== Thar Desert ===
- Ghaggar River

=== Tarim Basin ===
- Tarim River (China)
  - Yarkand River (China)
    - Shaksgam River

== Ancient rivers ==
- Ghaggar-Hakra River: An intermittent river in India and Pakistan that flows only during the monsoon season. While it is often identified with the Sarasvati River, this is not a consensus view. The Hakra is the dried-out channel of a river in Pakistan that is the continuation of the Ghaggar River in India. Several times, but not continuously, it carried the water of the Sutlej during the Bronze Age period. Many settlements of the Indus Valley civilisation have been found along the Ghaggar and Hakra rivers.
- Saraswati River: Also known as Sarasvati River. This river was one of the major rivers of Ancient India which no longer exists.
