= 1953 German–Austrian Nanga Parbat expedition =

First ascent of the mountain

Coordinates: 35°14′15″N 74°35′21″E

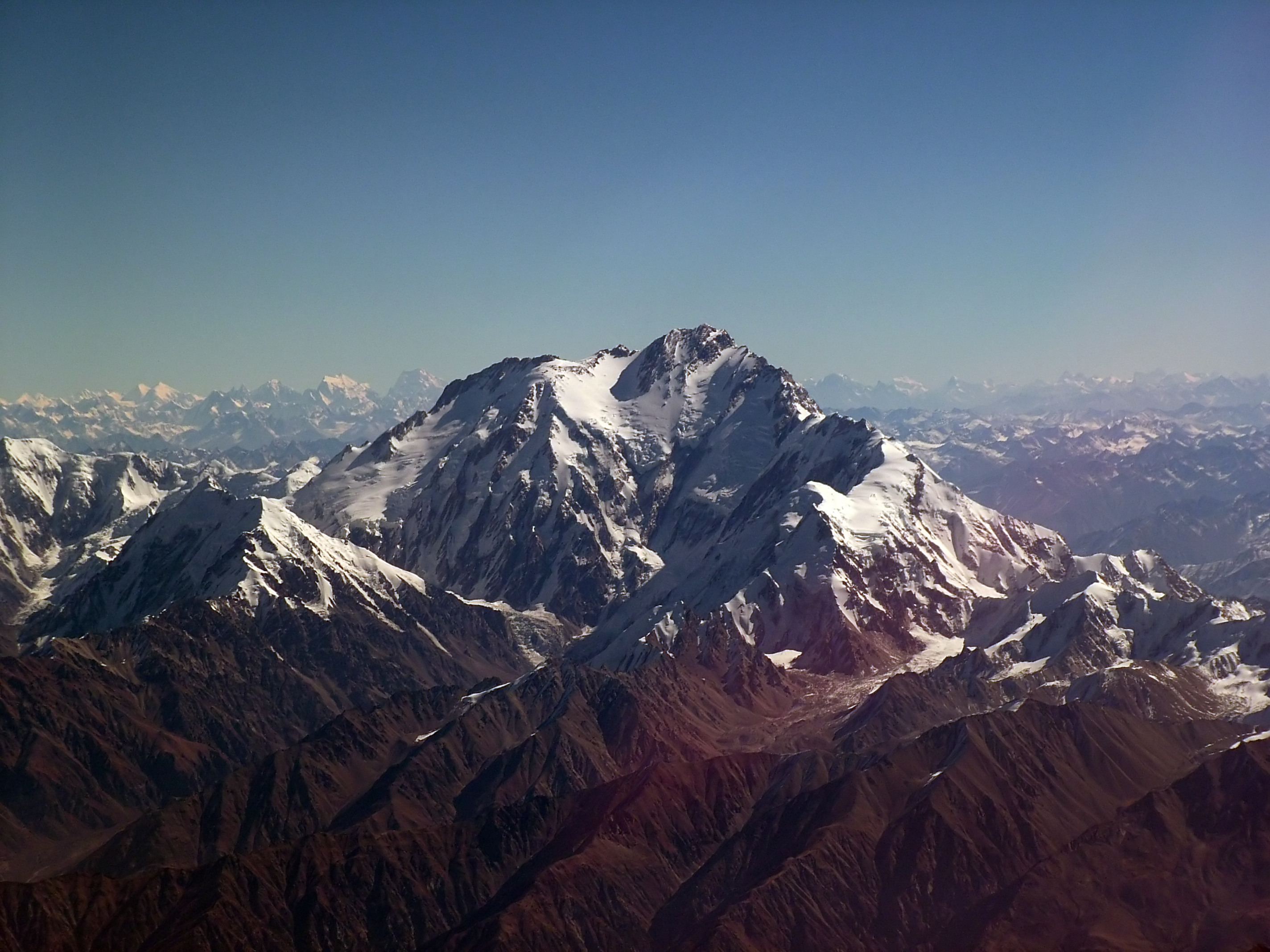
Nanga Parbat from the northwest (annotated image)

During the 1953 German–Austrian Nanga Parbat expedition (also called Willy Merkl Memorial Expedition, in German Willy-Merkl-Gedächtnis-Expedition), Hermann Buhl succeeded in making the first ascent of Nanga Parbat, the ninth highest mountain in the world. He reached the summit on 3 July 1953. This remains the only instance in which an 8,000-metre summit was first reached by an individual climbing alone. The expedition was led by Karl Herrligkoffer who subsequently led numerous attempts to climb other eight-thousand meter peaks in the Himalaya and Karakoram mountain ranges.

Buhl departed from the high camp around 02:00 on July 3, followed by his climbing partner an hour later. However, his partner soon returned to the tent. Buhl crawled on hands and knees, finally reaching the summit at 19:00. The descent proved even more challenging because he was missing an ice axe, a tent, and a crampon strap.

Darkness forced him to halt around 21:00, when he stayed on a precarious ledge with a single handhold. After a sleepless night, he resumed his descent at 04:00, ultimately reaching the tent at 19:00. His appearance shocked his two companions who had assumed his demise while awaiting his return. Herrligkoffer later criticized Buhl’s solo climb, deeming it disloyal to the original group plan for summiting.

== Background ==
=== Description of mountain ===
The 8,126-metre (26,659 ft) Nanga Parbat in Pakistan is at the extreme western end of the Himalaya mountain range. It is over 620 miles (1,000 km) from Dhaulagiri, its nearest eight-thousander neighbour in the Himalayas, but it is about 120 miles (190 km) from K2 in the Karakoram, separated by the Indus River flowing 7,000 metres (23,000 ft) lower than the summit. Nanga Parbat is the ninth-highest mountain in the world but, of the eight-thousanders, it is second only to Mount Everest in topographic prominence.

Unlike Nepal or Tibet, Pakistan allowed ready access to westerners and in 1953 it was possible to fly to Gilgit and then get by truck to within two days march of Base Camp.

=== Previous attempts to climb the mountain ===
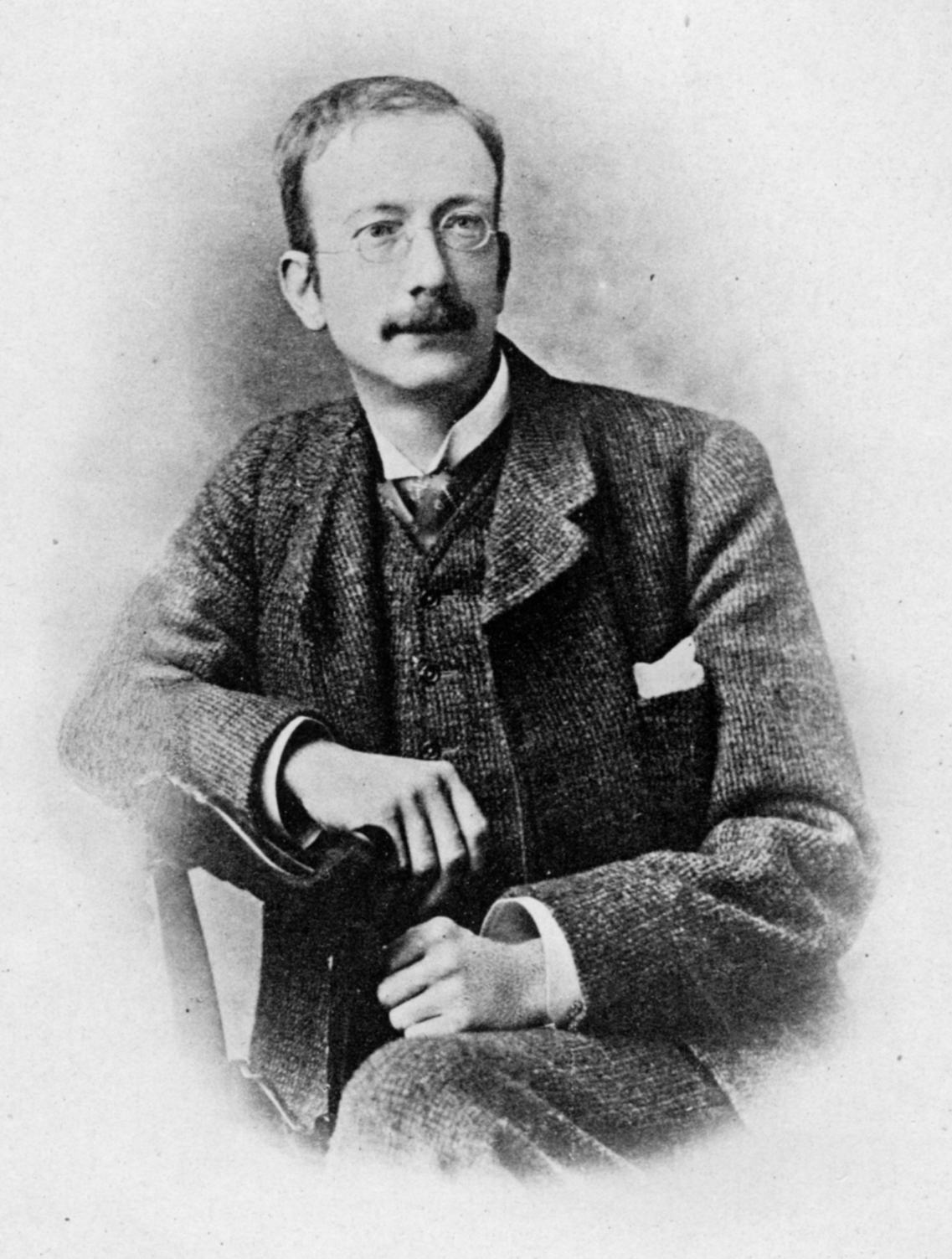
Fred Mummery

The first attempt to climb Nanga Parbat, which was also the first summit attempt on any eight-thousand-metre mountain, was by the Englishmen Fred Mummery, Geoffrey Hastings and Norman Collie in 1895. (Note: See Collie (1902).) Along with two Gurkha companions, Mummery died in an avalanche on the Rakhiot Face. From then until the Second World War all the expeditions to the mountain were from Germany – in 1932, 1934, 1937, 1938 and 1939. At that time Nepal and Tibet were closed to Germany so Nanga Parbat, in the Indian Empire, became the focus of German attention. The mountain was accessible politically and it could be approached reasonably easily while still providing a very difficult mountaineering challenge. Willy Merkl was the leader in 1932 and 1934 but on the 1934 expedition he was one of those who died, trapped in a storm slightly below the summit. In 1950 a British team of three explored the mountain but after a storm two of the climbers were not seen again. So, by 1953 there had been seven unsuccessful expeditions leading to 31 deaths.

=== Karl Herrligkoffer ===
Herrligkoffer was Merkl's younger half-brother and he was 17 years old when Merkl died. Over the years he developed a determination to lead an expedition, to be the Willy Merkl Memorial Expedition, to Nanga Parbat to replicate his brother's climb and go on to reach the summit. When he started an active organisation in 1951, he was met with scepticism because he had never been to Himalaya nor even had much experience in the Alps. Paul Bauer described him as "a man unknown in mountaineering circles and without experience in the subject". In 1934, Merkl had planned to have large group reach the summit together in honour of Germany. (Note: Willo Welzenbach, who died on the 1934 expedition, had written to his parents, "You can't hope to take a party of ten or twelve up to an 8000 meter peak. The result is that nobody gets to the top. But all preaching is of no avail here. Willy [Merkl] always knows best. Quoted in Isserman & Weaver (2008), p. 175) So Herrligkoffer wanted to achieve a group success and for it to be accomplished along the same route. Neither the German Himalaya Foundation nor the German Alpine Club, who had sponsored Merkl, would help in this enterprise but the club's Munich branch (that Herrligkoffer belonged to) and the Austrian Alpine Club did support the climb.

== Preparations ==
=== Climbing team ===
For the 1953 German–Austrian Nanga Parbat expedition (Note: Formally known as the Willy-Merkl-Gedächtnisexpedition (Willy Merkl Memorial Expedition).) Peter Aschenbrenner (50 years old), an Austrian mountain guide, was appointed deputy to Herrligkoffer (36) and was to be the climbing leader on the mountain. He had been on the 1932 and 1934 expeditions. He was due to leave the expedition at the beginning of July so Walter Frauenberger (45), also Austrian, who was initially deputy climbing leader, took over at that time.

Hermann Buhl (29), from Innsbruck in Austria was, by 1953, one of the leading Alpine climbers in Europe. He had climbed the North Face of the Eiger but had not been to Himalayas. He was joined by Kuno Rainer (38) who was also Austrian and Buhl's frequent climbing partner. The rest of the party was German. Otto Kempter (27) and Hermann Köllensperger (27) were from the Munich branch of the German Alpine Club and Albert Bitterling (52) was a mountain guide. The renowned cinematographer Hans Ertl (45) was also a mountaineer and he was in the team to make a documentary film. (Note: The film was Nanga Parbat (1953).) Fritz Aumann was the camp organiser but for a time was able to take a full part in the climbing. Herrligkoffer, a general practitioner by profession, as well as organising the expedition was the expedition doctor.

A team of five Sherpas, led by Pasang Dawa Lama, had been appointed but after being held up at for several weeks at the Pakistan–Kashmir frontier they were finally refused entry visas. Not knowing what was happening, at Gilgit Herrligkoffer took on twenty-two Hunzas as replacements, led by Rhabar Hassan, a Gilgit police officer who became the expedition's liaison officer with the Hunzas. (Note: Named by Mason as the best Hunzas were Madi (sirdar), Ali Madad, Haji Beg, and Hidayat Khan. but Herrligkoffer himself names Madi, Isa Khan, Degin Sha and Hadje Beg. praises Hidaiat Khan.) 300 local porters were taken on as casual labour at Talichi for carrying to base camp. (Note: Talichi is a village at the confluence of the Rakhiot and the Indus rivers.)

=== Equipment ===
The equipment used was based on that used on the expeditions before the war and they were considerably reliant on what was donated by businesses. Boots were traditional leather reaching above the ankle and with a rubber sole without Tricouni nails and with a double removable felt lining. Two thick and one thin sock could be worn in each boot and 2-metre (6 ft 7 in) woollen puttees were worn. (Note: The puttees are stated to be 2-metre.). In their Deuter tents they were pleased with the innovative inflatable mattresses but regretted their own choice of snap fasteners to close the tent flaps. The sleeping bags were double so that they could slip into each other. They envied the British on Everest who they considered had better designed and tested equipment.

For clothing they had gaberdine trousers and double-layer Ninoflex anoraks (Note: Ninoflex is a German type of waterproof, breathable fabric.) worn over multiple layers of woollen garments. The climbers' gloves were of horse-hide and the Hunzas' of Perlon. Climbing ropes were 8-mm Perlon. Their oxygen sets were taken as a precaution but they hoped to avoid using supplementary oxygen – in the event it was carried as high as Camp V but it was not used for climbing. One of the three radio communications sets was damaged in transit but the others proved useful.

== Departure from Munich and trek to Base Camp ==
The team left Munich by train on 17 April 1953 and at Genoa boarded the Lloyd Triestino MV Victoria bound for Karachi via the Suez Canal. Time on the voyage was spent learning Urdu. They received a great welcome in the newly-independent Pakistan particularly when they agreed to raise the Pakistan flag on the summit of Nanga Parbat which was, and still is, in the Pakistan-controlled area of the disputed Kashmir region. After arranging for daily weather forecasts to be broadcast by Radio Rawalpindi (Note: Later it was changed for a United Nations transmitter to be used.) they went in an air-conditioned train (Note: The outside temperature was up to 48 °C (118 °F) in the shade as they travelled through the Thar Desert) as far as Lahore with the junior team members following with the baggage in two ordinary trains. Then even poorer trains took them to Rawalpindi from where they had arranged to be flown with their nine tons of baggage to Gilgit in four separate flights by Dakota.

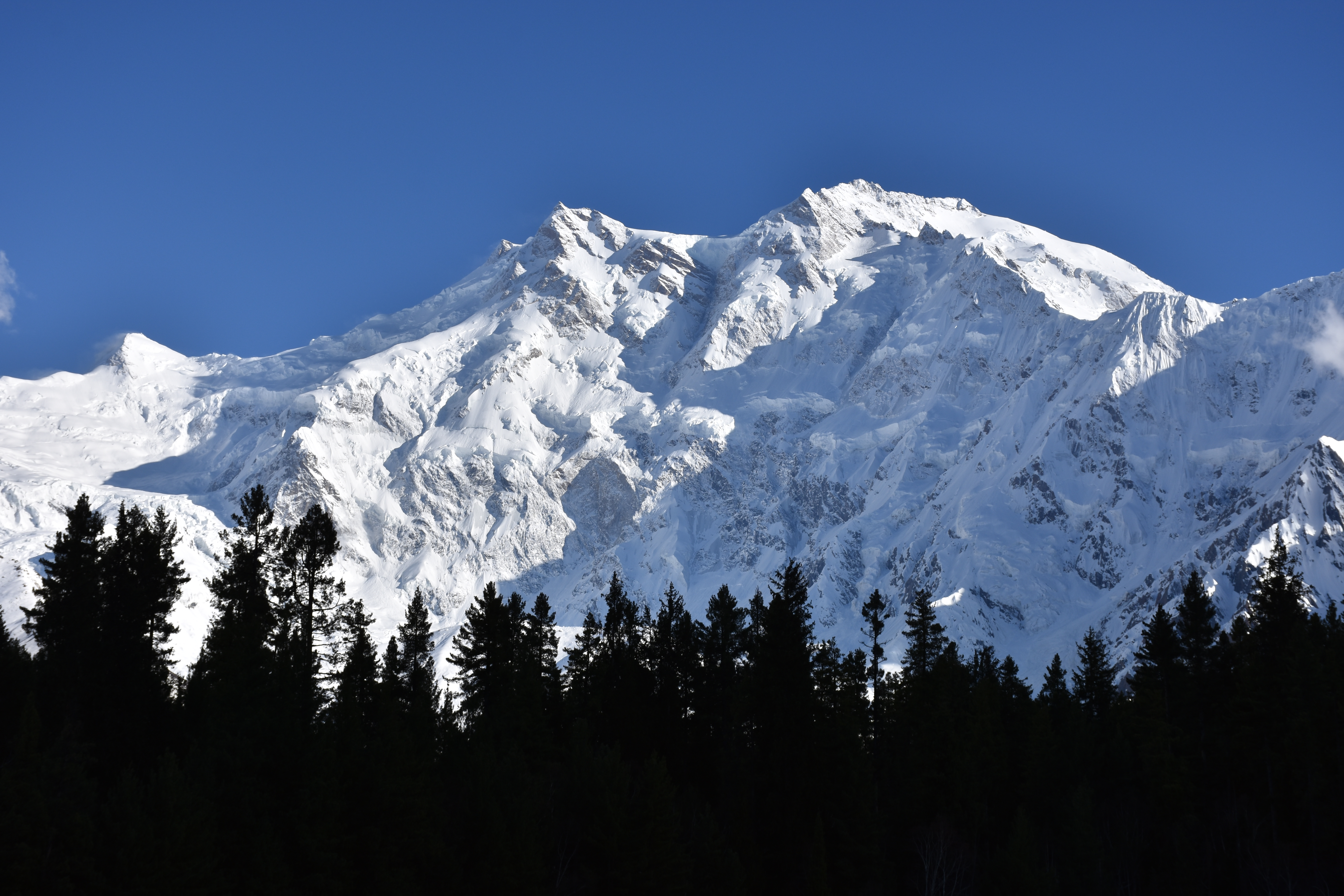
Rakhiot Face from Fairy Meadows

When they arrived in Gilgit a team of twenty-two Hunza porters had already been arranged (see section Hunza porters below). (Note: On 10 May 1953 another group of 20 Hunzas arrived in Gilgit but they were immediately paid off.) They were entertained with a game of polo and a series of banquets. On 8 May at a grand ceremony they were presented with a large Pakistani flag to be flown at Base camp and a small pennant for the summit. Then, over the next days they drove in fleets of trucks up the Indus valley to Talichi where they met 300 hill-peasant porters for the carry to Base Camp which commenced on 13 May. Trekking up the Rakhiot valley they left the last habitation at Tato (Note: Tato is now Tattu.) and set up their interim base camp at 3,700 metres (12,000 ft) somewhat beyond Fairy Meadows. (Note: The Fairy Meadows were given this name, in German Märchenwiese, on the 1932 German expedition.)

The permanent base camp was further up the valley beyond the snout of the Rakhiot Glacier and on a moraine mound at about 4,000 metres (13,000 ft). The porters refused to go any further so it was left to the climbers and Hunzas to establish Base Camp which was done by 25 May.

== Progress up mountain ==
Region of Nanga Parbat summit
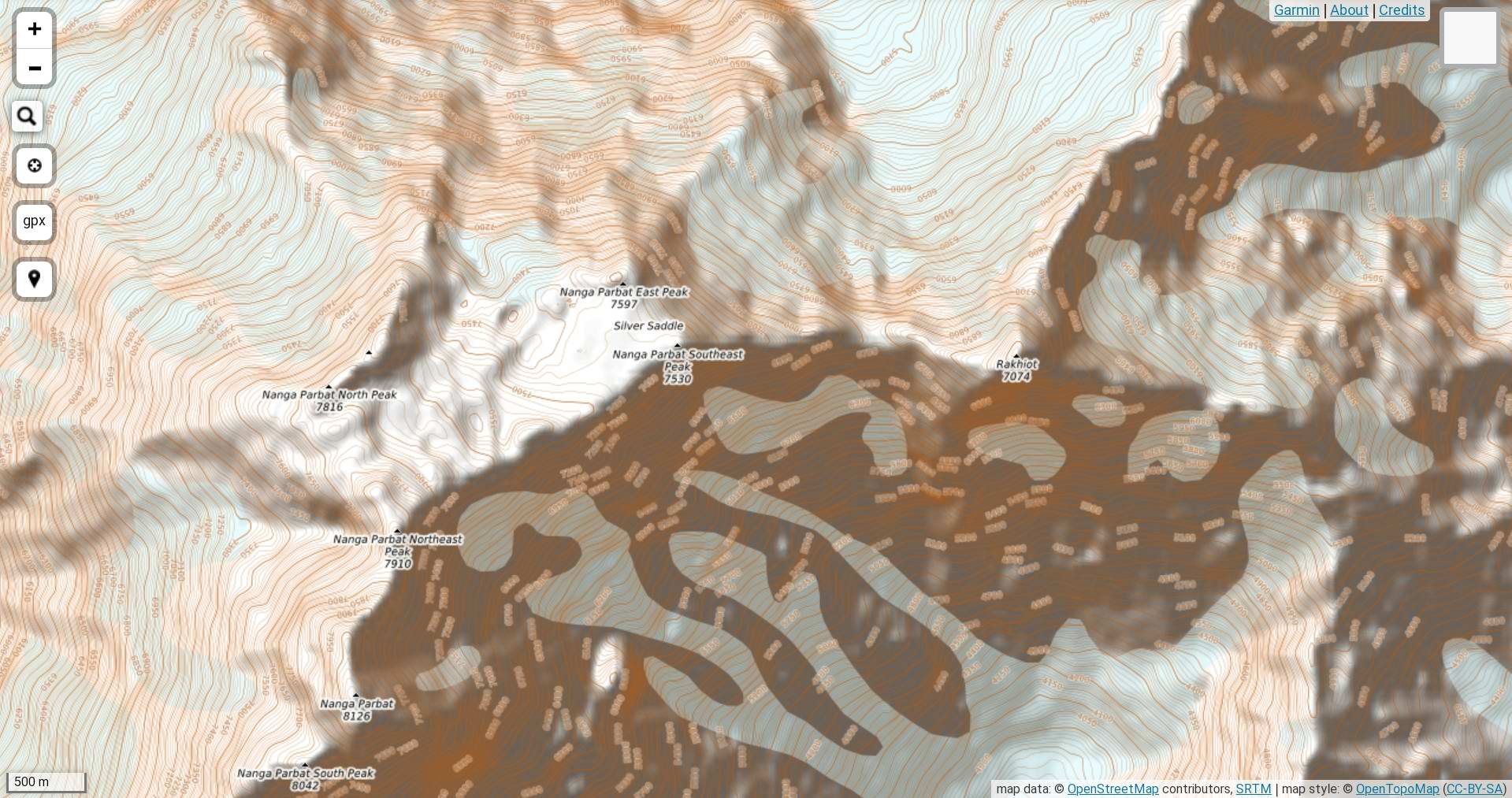
- OpenTopoMap online mapping
- Nanga Parbat summit region

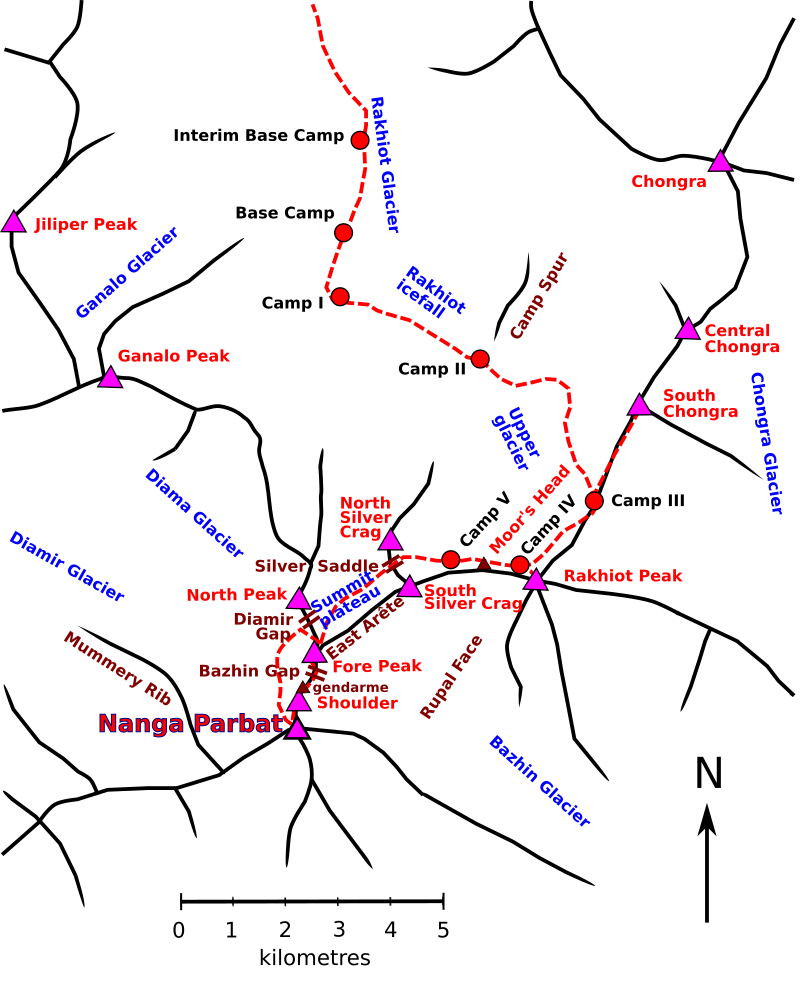
Sketch map of route up Nanga Parbat

Locations of camps
Camp	Altitude		Date occupied (1953)	Description
Camp	feet	metres (Note: Converted from altitude in feet.)	Date occupied (1953)	Description
Interim base	12,250	3,730	12 May	Rakhiot valley
Base Camp	13,000	4,000	25 May	foot of Rakhiot Great Moraine
Camp I	14,600	4,500	26 May	foot of Rakhiot icefall
Camp II	17,400	5,300	31 May	above icefall
Camp III	20,180	6,150	10 June	upper Rakhiot glacier
Camp IV	22,000	6,700	12 June	base of Rakhiot Peak ice wall
Camp V	22,640	6,900	2 July	above Moor's Head, below East Arête
Summit	26,659	8,126	3 July	"small snow-plateau, a couple of mounds"

=== Camps I and II ===
The intention was to establish Camp I at 4,494 metres (14,745 ft) at the foot of the Great Icefall on the Rakhiot Glacier, sheltered from avalanches by a large rock. However the Hunzas went on strike asking for more food, clothes and pay and a reduction in their loads from 28 kilograms (62 lb) to 18 kilograms (40 lb). They were dismissed and, indeed, five of them left without pay. Hassan advised Herrligkoffer that just to be given extra food would be sufficient. The Hunzas were made to apologise personally and after prolonged delay nine of them were willing to go up to Camp I and Herrligkoffer started to arrange for 10 to 15 porters to be recruited from Tato in the Rakhiot valley to help up to Camp I. The lambardar or mayor of Tato insisted in joining in and Herrligkoffer found him a useless porter and a disruptive influence.

From Camp I on 28 May, Buhl and Rainer started reconnoitring a route up the icefall but they turned back exhausted after over 12 hours of work and only reaching 400 metres (1,300 ft) of the 910 metres (3,000 ft) to the intended site for Camp II at 5,300 metres (17,400 ft). Frauenberger considered this the most dangerous part of the whole climb. Each day a separate pair of climbers furthered the icefall route until by 30 May they had reached only 91 metres (300 ft) below the site. Also by this time ten Hunzas and twenty Tato porters were carrying loads up to Camp I. Fixed ropes, rope ladders and a bridge were installed up to Camp II to let the Hunzas carry up to there as well. This camp provided a magnificent view of the Rakhiot Face and surroundings and would be used as a viewpoint for observing progress on the mountain. But it was also dangerous there with seracs all around and crevasses even passing between the tents.

=== Camp III ===
On 6 June Rainer and Kempter started prospecting the route to Camp III and on 9 June Buhl and Bitterling led twelve Hunzas up to near the planned location for this camp at about 6,100 metres (20,000 ft). Herrligkoffer thought progress had been too slow so he sent Hassan to recruit twelve more Hunzas but it turned out only four of them were at all effective. Aschenbrenner then seized on a spell of good weather to arrange for Buhl, Kempter, Köllensperger and Rainer to start to force a way rapidly up towards Rakhiot Peak and then to traverse to the East Arête, leaving the older team members to establish the camps. This was generally the route taken on the 1934 expedition – the 1932 expedition had tried to take a technically simpler lower route across the so-called "Mulde" (amphitheatre) at the base of Rakhiot Peak but had become bogged down in the snow.

Buhl wrote that he and Köllensperger set off with some porters at 04:00 on 10 June to try to establish Camps III and IV on that day. They reached the site of the earlier expeditions' Camp III very early so Buhl led his porters straight past without explaining to them and on to the site of the previous Camp IV. Frauenberger followed them with more porters. By 07:00 they were at the level plateau at 6,134 metres (20,125 ft) – Camp IV had been here in 1932 and 1934 but the 1937 expedition had set up camp some 91 metres (300 ft) lower. Rather than wait for everyone else, Buhl rapidly climbed the 6,450-metre (21,162 ft) South Chongra (a subsidiary peak of Chongra Peak) and returned to help set up their own Camp III before noon. He and Frauenberger stayed overnight at the camp and everyone else went down. Next day Frauenberger also climbed South Chongra and Köllensperger came up with three porters bringing fuel and supplies. On 12 June Buhl and Frauenberger managed to reach 6,700 metres (22,000 ft) at the foot of the ice wall rising to Rakhiot Peak – the place that would become their Camp IV – but a gathering storm made them go back to Camp III. They later heard that the South Chongra excursions had been disapproved of by those in charge because they were not part of the essential plan.

In his book Herrligkoffer places these events as being part of a new plan involving a whole team of climbers to speed up progress, a plan that Ashenbrenner, the climbing leader, launched on 11 June.

=== Camp IV ===
For a week the storm and deep snow prevented any progress above Camp III but on the fifth day of the storm Ashenbrenner, Ertl, Rainer, Kempter and Köllensperger arrived with porters to join them at Camp III with ample supplies. This, and the news coming through that Everest had been climbed, was a great encouragement. It was only on 18 June when the weather was fine, but the temperature was −21 °C (−6 °F) (Note: Buhl does not specify Celsius or Fahrenheit but Herrligkoffer suggests −15 to −20 °C night temperature at Camp III at this time.), Frauenberger, Rainer, Köllensperger and Buhl were able to struggle up to the site for Camp IV where they dug two snow holes for tents. One cave could be quite roomy because they encountered a crevasse when digging and so were able to dump snow into it and then fill the gap. The next day Kempter and Buhl were able to stay the night at Camp IV.

From Camp IV the whole route to the summit could be seen. They would cross the 7,597-metre (24,925 ft) Silbersattel (or Silver Saddle), a broad snow-covered pass between the north and south Silberzacken peaks. (Note: The north and south Silberzacken were sometimes referred to as the Silver Crag and the Southeast Summit. The latter lies on the East Arête itself.) After that was the so-called Fore Summit (Note: The Fore Summit was sometimes simply referred to as the subsidiary summit.) to be negotiated in some way from where the East Arête led on via a notched col at the Bazhin Gap, then over the 8,070-metre (26,478 ft) Shoulder and on to the summit of Nanga Parbat itself.

The next few days were spent bringing up belaying rope and pitons preparing the way for Hunzas to climb to Camps IV and V but frequent storms delayed progress. In this way they reached the Moor's Head. Buhl and Kempter took time out to climb Rakhiot Peak, their first 7,000-metre peak, with Buhl climbing the pinnacle on the summit so pointed he could barely stand on it and from where he could look down on the vast Rupal Face to the south. Returning down they cut steps in the snow for the Hunzas. Although they were now ready for supplies to be carried higher the Hunzas, even the ones considered most capable, all claimed to be sick and storms intervened again.

Buhl had now recovered from a very severe cough but Rainer was suffering from phlebitis and had to return to base camp. Hence, Buhl and Kempter were poised to set up Camp V and make a bid for the summit. However Herrligkoffer wanted to attain success for the team, not for particular individuals, and was determined to control matters himself from Base Camp: "If I had to choose between the two I would always go for the collaborative expedition that didn't reach the summit". (Note: Isserman and Weaver taking the quote from Sale (2004), p. 23.) Herrligkoffer heard from the radio at Rawalpindi that the monsoon was imminent and from low on the mountain the conditions high up indeed looked very threatening so on 30 June he radioed to the four climbers and four Hunzas at Camp III to return to Base Camp. The climbers replied that the weather was good there so Herrligkoffer threatened to stop any further support. However Frauenberger was able to persuade Aschenbrenner (Note: Aschenbrenner had descended to base camp and was about to leave the expedition, handing over the climbing leadership to Frauenberger.) to allow them to proceed and so he, along with Buhl, Kempter and Ertl climbed up to Camp IV in glorious weather on 1 July. Next day they were again ordered to retreat from Camp IV and again they successfully resisted.

=== Camp V ===
The four climbers were at last able to persuade the Hunzas to accompany them in good weather along the difficult route across the Rakhiot Face and to reach the "Moor's Head" (Note: The Moor's Head is a granite crag on the East Arête just before the low point of the ridge towards the Silver Saddle. These features were all named on the 1934 expedition.) and establish Camp V behind the Moor's Head on 2 July.

The expedition's plan had been for one more higher camp, possibly at the Bazhin Gap, but they decided because of the good weather that Buhl and Kempter would try next day for the summit. It would be an ascent of 1,200 metres (4,000 ft) over a distance of 4 miles (6.4 km). Frauenberger and Ertl would have liked to stay at Camp V to make their own bid the day after but there was no room in the tent so they accepted they would drop down to make way for the younger men.

== Summit attempt ==
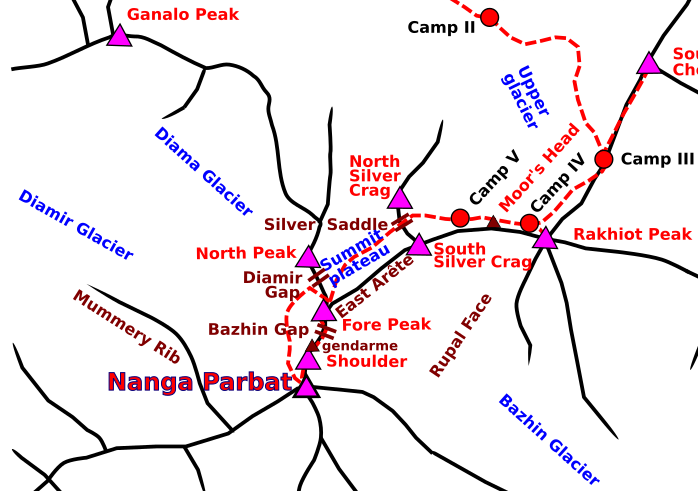
Sketch map of route in region around summit

=== 3 July 1953 ===
By 02:00 on 3 July Buhl was ready to leave the tent and set off for the summit but Kempter only stayed in his sleeping bag. (Note: In the Himalayan Journal Buhl provides an excellent brief account of his summit climb.) Leaving Kempter with some of the food because he said he would soon follow, Buhl took the rest of the food, the Pakistan flag and Tirolese pennants, stimulant and anti-frostbite drugs (Pervitin and Padutin), ice axe, ski poles, crampons and a camera but no rope or climbing gear. As planned, neither took supplementary oxygen. There was an almost complete calm, it was very cold, and the night sky was clear. Once he reached the crest of the East Arête the soft snow gave way to firm and progress was good though he was already taking two breaths for every stride. The sun was rising by 05:00 and Buhl could see Kempter about one hour behind.

By 07:00 he reached the Silver Saddle and could see the summit plateau stretching ahead. He decided not to wait for his partner and started crossing the plateau, now taking five breaths per stride. After three hours, from far side of the plateau, he could see Kempter on the Silver Saddle itself. Buhl was now at the level of the Bazhin Gap, a planned objective, but before him was the vertical south wall of the Fore Peak which he could not traverse alone. The easiest route was to descend to the Diamir Gap but that involved a considerable climb up again. He was near the highest point reached by Aschenbrenner and Schneider on the 1934 expedition. He decided to skirt the Fore Peak closely to the north but he left his rucksack and carried only absolute necessities – by mistake he left a sweater in his rucksack. Not attempting the 37 metres (120 ft) climb to the 8,055-metre (26,428 ft) summit of the Fore Peak by 14:00 he attained the Bazhin Gap, a col crossing the East Arête, and he ascended the sharp, corniced ridge to the Shoulder with the 5,200-metre (17,000 ft) Rupal Face to his left. A gendarme rock pinnacle blocked the way but he passed it to the north using a hanging traverse which involved climbing down to a snow gully using his bare hands to jam into the rock. He climbed up again to the crest of the ridge and at 18:00 was at the top of the Shoulder at 8,070 metres (26,478 ft). After a gulp of coca tea he found the going easier but he was very tired and was reduced to crawling on all fours.

=== Summit ===
At 19:00 on 3 July 1953 Buhl reached the summit of Nanga Parbat itself. After seventeen hours' solo effort he became, and remains, the only person to have made the first ascent of an eight-thousand metre peak by himself. He took photographs and tied the Pakistan flag to his ice axe to leave it there as evidence. After about 30 minutes he took a small stone from the summit for his wife and started to descend using his ski poles but he soon regretted leaving his ice axe behind. He knew he would not be able to traverse past the gendarme again so he went down a snow slope towards the top of the ridge called the Mummery Rib hoping to regain the East Arête before dark and reach camp V across the Silver Plateau in moonlight. However, severely delayed by a broken crampon strap, he was forced to stop in the dark at 21:00. He was forced to wait out the night at about 7,900 metres (26,000 ft) with only room for standing and leaning against a rock with a single handhold. He had nothing to eat or drink and missed his spare sweater but he fortified himself with stimulant and anti-frostbite pills. The weather was completely calm and the sky was filled with stars.

=== Descent to Base Camp ===
Buhl (29 years old) on his return from the summit, photographed by Ertl, 5 July 1953

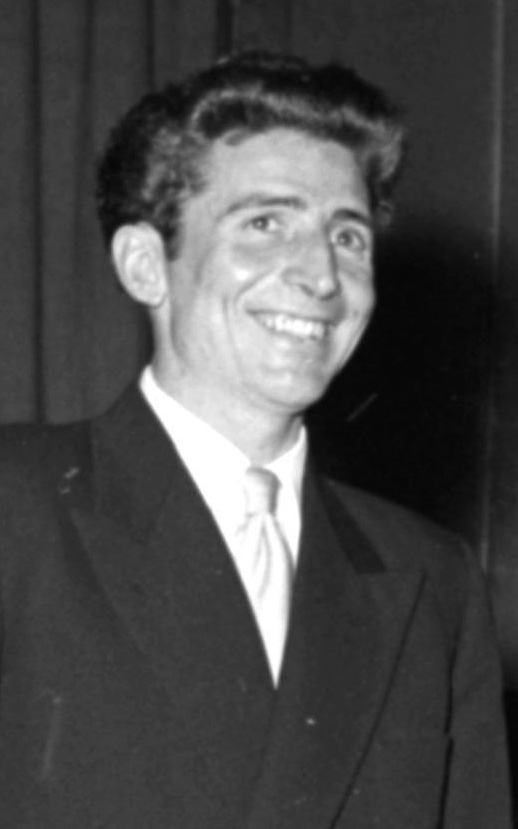
Buhl 25 October 1953, after he had recovered

At first light on 4 July he continued down a rocky slope eventually reaching just under the Diamir Gap at noon then climbing up to below the Fore Peak to retrieve his rucksack. By this time the intense cold had given way to excessive heat in the sun. He was fortunate in managing to find his rucksack which provided him with glucose tablets which he swallowed mixed with snow. Accompanied by an imaginary companion he fought his way across the plateau to reach the Silver Saddle at 17:30 from where he could see the tent.

At 19:00, after forty-one hours on his own, he neared the tent and Ertl joyfully came to meet him. He called across to Frauenberger at the Moor's Head who had started descending to Camp IV to leave room for two at Camp V in case Buhl returned. Their plan had been to take oxygen and start searching next day. To begin with they tactfully did not ask if he had reached the summit. They treated his frostbitten toes as best they could.

Next day they hurried down before the weather broke and they reached Camp III. On 6 July they were met by Aumann and Köllensperger with fifteen Hunzas who were delighted by the success. Ertl took a photograph of Buhl showing the hardship he had suffered "This famous portrait, arguably one of the most iconic in mountaineering history, was taken as Buhl made his descent". (Note: Another comment "The most famous picture of Herman Buhl and probably one of the most famous picture in mountaineering history. It was taken by Fritz Aumann on July 5, 1953, between camp III and II. At the time this picture is taken, Herman Buhl is 29". However, Buhl himself credits the photograph to Hans Ertl.) Heated by the sun, the snow and ice conditions became dreadful so they had to stop at Camp II before starting off next day in the chill of the morning with Buhl in agony from his frostbite and inflamed throat. They reached Base Camp to what Buhl later described as "the coolest of receptions".

== Return to Germany ==
It was at Base Camp on 7 July that Herrligkoffer started treating Buhl's frostbite. He said that he did not climb up the mountain to treat Buhl sooner because originally his condition was not thought to be serious but by the time Buhl reached Base Camp it was too late to save his toes. Herrligkoffer offered to take Buhl as quickly as possible to hospital in Gilgit but for whatever reason Buhl was carried back along with the main party. In the event Buhl had to have half of each of two toes amputated.

The expedition returned to the Indus valley in torrential monsoon rain from where they were able to telephone for trucks. On their journey to Gilgit large numbers of people who emerged to cheer them and in Karachi they were given a welcoming ceremony by the president of Pakistan and government ministers. By 22 July they flew back to Munich in groups and where the Berlin Geographical Society presented the expedition with its gold medal.

However, the success of the expedition was marred by various recriminations. Herrligkoffer had not approved of the lead climbers' (particularly Buhl's) going against the team orders on the ascent and provided a very cool reception for them on the return to base camp and back in Germany he downplayed Buhl's role. Buhl retaliated by publishing his book Nanga Parbat Pilgrimage and by giving public lectures without permission and so breaking his contract. The returning climbers were polarised into two groups. Those who Herrligkoffer felt had sacrificed their own personal ambitions he invited on his next expedition to Gasherbrum I then redirecting to Broad Peak but the summit attempt failed. Buhl was not invited and the expedition was not successful. Buhl then successfully tackled Broad Peak in 1957 but he was killed when trying for Chogolisa immediately afterwards.

== Other issues ==
=== Hunza porters ===
Early in 1953, before departure from Munich, Herrligkoffer had arranged for five Sherpas based in Darjeeling, led by Pasang Dawa Lama, to join the party in Rawalpindi. They did not arrive as scheduled so instructions were left for them to follow on when they arrived. The previous 1934 Nanga Parbat expedition had employed Sherpas and Bhotias based in Darjeeling who had been found more capable than the Hunzas of 1932. However, following Pakistan's independence, there was a delay in visas being issued to people from India and so this expedition and the 1953 American Karakoram expedition had needed to employ local Hunza porters. There were difficulties other than political – Sherpas had suffered many deaths on Nanga Parbat and so tried to avoid the mountain, and that year there was a great demand for Sherpas, particularly from the 1953 British Mount Everest expedition. (Note: In Appendix B to Herrligkoffer (1954), pp. 229–238 by Brockett and Ehrenzweig, the translators of the book.)

The Hunza porters came from the Hunza valley to the north of Gilgit. Herrligkoffer compared them unfavourably with Sherpas but he put this down to their comparative inexperience with mountain climbing rather than anything else. In his book Herrligkoffer praises Madi, the sirdar, and a group led by Isa Khan but says that only twelve of the twenty-two Hunzas were willing and adaptable. They were, however, willing, hefty and enthusiastic but needing to be supervised.

=== Rudolf Rott ===
Rudolf Rott, from Augsburg, was an enthusiast for Nanga Parbat although he had no mountaineering experience. He had applied to join the expedition before it had left Germany but after he was turned down he had hitch-hiked to Karachi in Pakistan where he became ill and had to be hospitalised for a few weeks. Again he applied unsuccessfully to join the team. Then, unknown to the expedition, he hitch-hiked to Rawalpindi where he was refused an entry visa to Chilas. He then went along the Kaghan Valley to cross the Babusar Pass so arriving at Base Camp in early June, equipped with tent, ice axe and 27-kilogram (60 lb) rucksack, and asking to stay for a fortnight. Herrligkoffer decided to make him welcome, applied retrospectively for an entry visa for him, and appointed him deputy camp manager. This freed up Aumann for the actual climb enabling him to reach the Moor's Head at 7,000 metres (23,000 ft). Sadly for Rott the police later arrived to escort him away to Gilgit because he had entered Kashmir illegally.

== See also ==
- List of Austrian mountain climbers
