= Laila Peak (Rupal Valley) =

Mountain peak in Pakistan

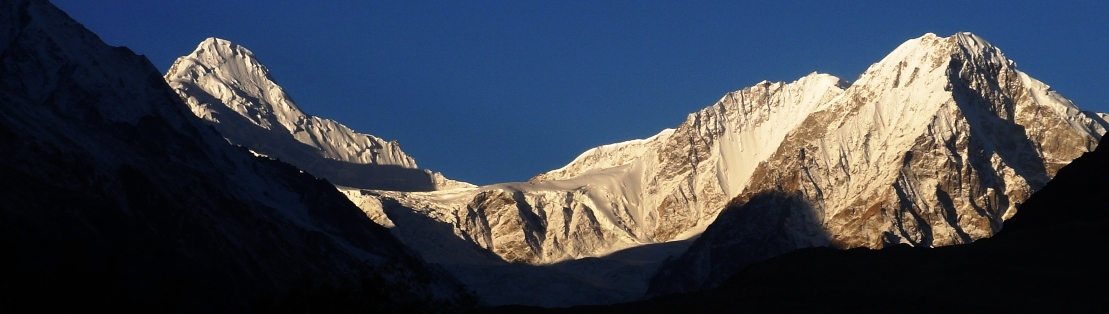
- Laila Peak (left) and the upper Rupal Glacier

Highest point
- Elevation: 6,132 m (20,118 ft)
- Prominence: 752 m (2,467 ft)
- Listing: List of mountains in Pakistan
- Coordinates: 35°06′20″N 74°27′54.4″E

Geography
- Location within Gilgit Baltistan Location within Pakistan
- Location: Pakistan
- Parent range: Himalayas, Rupal Valley

Laila Peak is a major prominence at the southwestern terminus of the Rupal Valley in Pakistan. The peak soars 6,132 metres (20,118 ft) above sea level and some 7,500 feet (2,290 m) above the Rupal Valley floor. To its north lies the Rupal Glacier and to its east lies 5,642-metre (18,510 ft) Rupal Peak. To the north of the Rupal Glacier stands the Nanga Parbat massif, one of largest in the world. Nanga Parbat itself soars 8,126 m (26,660 ft) above sea level. About its flanks stand numerous notable peaks including Rakhiot Peak, Chongra Peak, Shaigiri and Mazeno Peak.

== See also ==
- Highest Mountains of the World

== Sources ==
1. Coordinates located using maps in Pakistan Trekking Guide, by Isobel and Ben Shaw, printed 1993.
