= Shaigiri =

Mountain in Pakistan

Shaigiri شایگیری
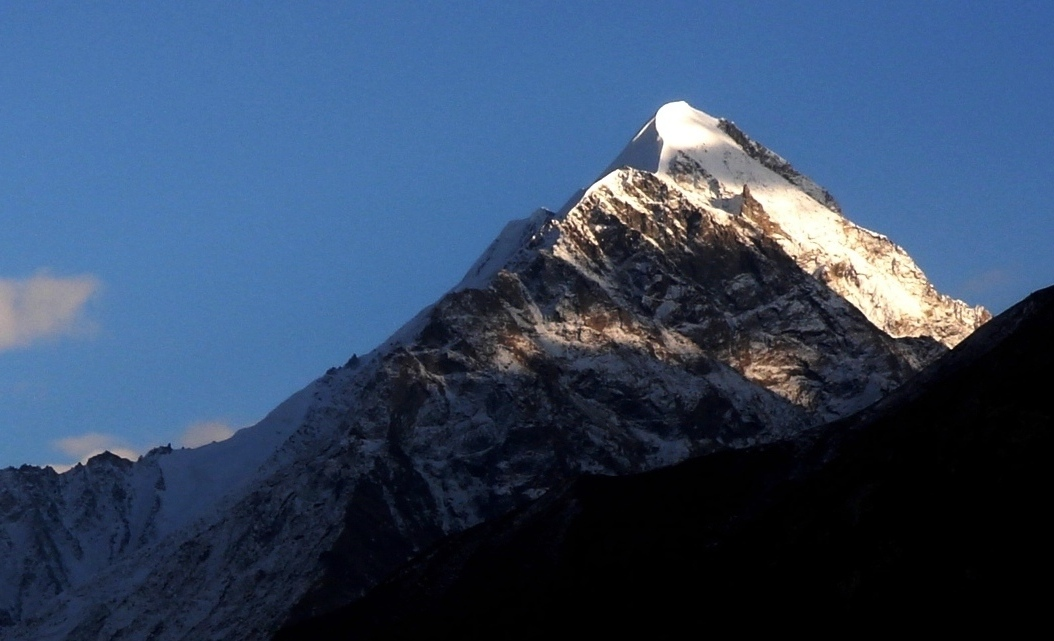

Highest point
- Elevation: 5,584 m (18,320 ft)
- Listing: List of mountains in Pakistan
- Coordinates: 35°07′37.42″N 74°32′20.7″E

Geography
- Location within Pakistan
- Location: Gilgit–Baltistan, Pakistan
- Parent range: Himalayas

Shaigiri (Urdu: شایگیری) is a mountain in Pakistan's western Himalayas. The peak rises precipitously from the south end of the Rupal Valley, soaring 5,584 metres (18,320 ft) above sea level and some 6,500 ft (1,980 m) above the valley floor. To its east stands Rupal Peak, to its west, the iceflows of Rupal Glacier. Despite its impressive height and unique pyramid shape, Shaigiri is greatly overshadowed by its giant neighbor to the north, the 8,126-metre Nanga Parbat. Though the peak itself is seldom climbed, its northern base camp (11,989 ft; 3,654 m) is a summer destination for travelers, mountaineers and local herdsmen. The peak is highly visible from most of the Rupal Valley. From Shaigiri's base, Nanga Parbat's Rupal Face and the eastern end of the Mazeno Wall are visible.

Shaigiri is accessible via the Astore Valley, which opens to the great Indus River south of Gilgit. Most treks to Shaigiri, the Mazeno Pass and Nanga Parbat's Rupal Face are staged from the remote village of Tarashing, which is reached by jeep from Astore. Astore can be reached by bus or jeep from Gilgit, a major town on the Karakorum Highway.

== See also ==
- Highest mountains of the world
