= Glacial stream =

Body of liquid water that flows down a channel formed by a glacier

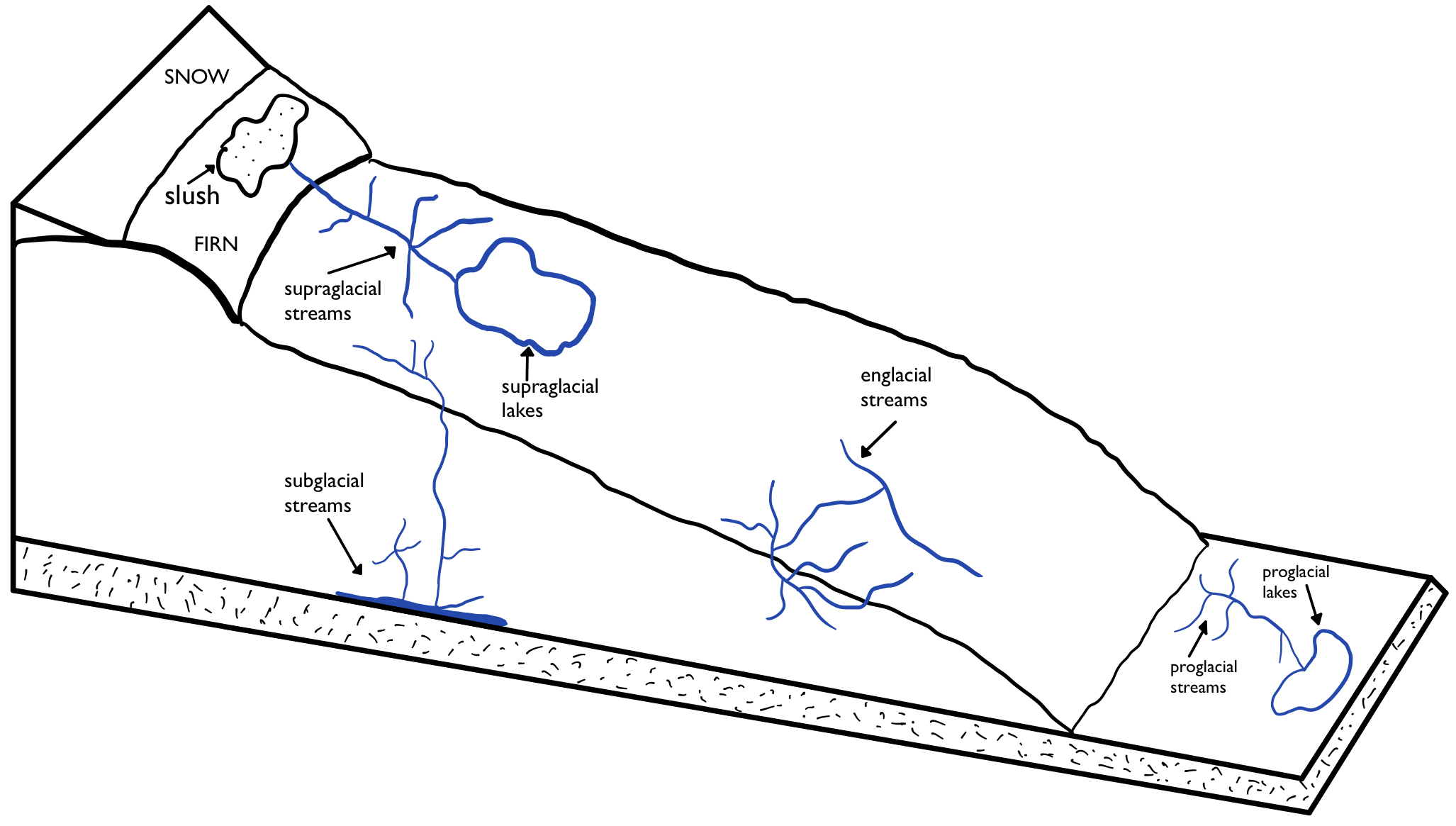
Image shows the different stream types that are found on a glacier. The different streams are supraglacial, subglacial, englacial and proglacial.

A glacier stream is a channelized area that is formed by a glacier in which liquid water accumulates and flows. Glacial streams are also commonly referred to as "glacier stream" or/and "glacial meltwater stream". The movement of the water is influenced and directed by gravity and the melting of ice. The melting of ice forms different types of glacial streams such as supraglacial, englacial, subglacial and proglacial streams. Water enters supraglacial streams that sit at the top of the glacier via filtering through snow in the accumulation zone and forming slush pools at the firn zone. The water accumulates on top of the glacier in supraglacial lakes and into supraglacial stream channels. The meltwater then flows through various different streams either entering inside the glacier into englacial channels or under the glacier into subglacial channels. Finally, the water leaves the glacier through proglacial streams or lakes. Proglacial streams do not only act as the terminus point but can also receive meltwater. Glacial streams can play a significant role in energy exchange and in the transport of meltwater and sediment.

== Stream/Channel Formation ==
Glaciers erode and deposit sediment by advancing and retreating. Erosion occurs by abrasion and plucking. These processes are dependent on a variety of factors such as plate tectonic movement, volcanic activity, and changes in atmospheric gas composition. Glacial erosion often causes U-shaped valleys to form. These valleys allow for directed water movement such as seen in glacial streams with meltwater. Subglacial fluvial erosion and glacial outwash occurs from the melting of the glacier and creates water flow that can wear bedrock. Glacial streams can range in width and height from a few centimeters to several tens of meters. The streams can be classified using three metrics: surface, incision, and canyons. The incision and sinuosity is impacted by the discharge and slope. When the discharge and slope is greater, the incision is faster and sinuosity is higher. The sinuosity being higher means the valley between the top of the banks distance is greater. This causes formation of trapezoidal canyon like valleys. The stream slope is influenced by basal topography, ice thickness and flow, and glacier ablation. A real life example of meltwater stream channel formation is shown in this video of the Fox Glacier.

== Geographical Distribution ==
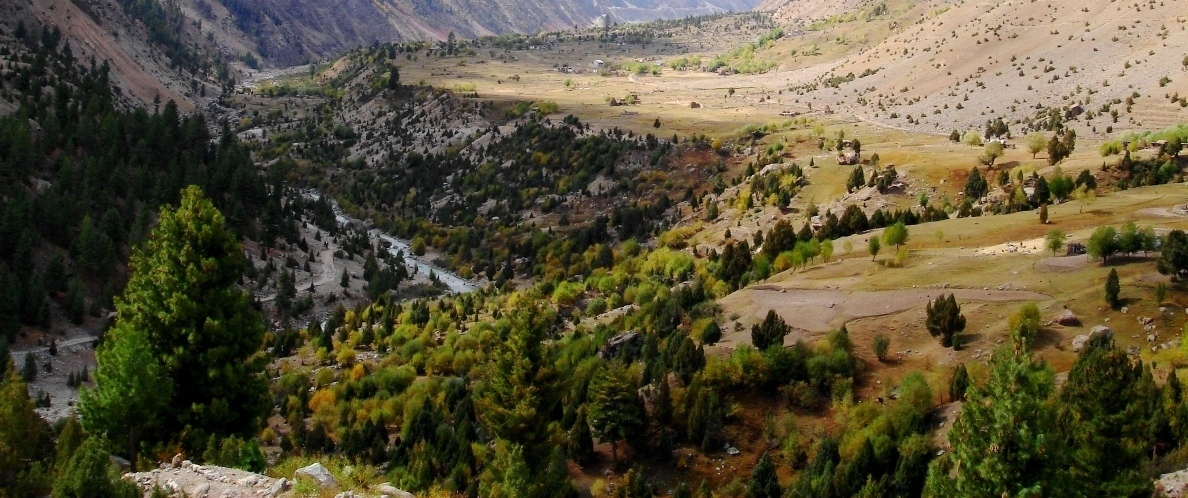
Rupal River is an example of glacial stream.

Glacial streams are found globally in regions of glacier presence, often located in high latitudes or alpine environments. Remote sensing and other GIS systems are often used to detect and study these streams. The length of glacial streams varies substantially between different regions, often dependent on the size of the watershed it is located in and the characteristics of the glacier that formed the stream channel.

An example of a glacial stream is the Rupal River.

== Hydrology of Glacial Meltwater Streams ==
Glacial stream discharge fluctuates throughout the year depending on snowmelt, glacier ablation, channel boundary melt, and precipitation. Measurements of discharge increase during spring and are highest in the summer, during which warmer temperatures promote the additions of meltwater. Meltwater is a major contributor to many glacial stream’s annual water budget. The amount of meltwater a glacial stream receives is dependent on the size of the watershed it is located in; larger watersheds tend to have greater accumulations of snow, and therefore high measurements of meltwater and annual discharge. However, in regions of prominent glacier presence, glacial streams only receive an average of 52% of meltwater production; a large portion of meltwater runoff enters the crevasses of the surrounding glacier.

Glacial streams often undergo flood pulses during spring and summer due to glacial melting. These flood pulses alter stream discharge in its velocity and momentum, often increasing the glacial stream’s composition of nutrients, solutes, and dissolved gas. Ecosystem productivity often measures highest in glacial streams that fluctuate in their rates of discharge.

== Ecology ==
The harsh condition of glacial streams is not only because glacial streams are often located at high altitude and latitude, but also the consistent contribution of melting snow. Thus, low water temperature, variable discharge rates, unstable substrate and riverbed, and increased turbidity and sediment load are the typical condition of glacial streams.

The growth of invertebrates in glacial streams is faster characterized by higher body mass. The reasons are the low level of competition and the abundant food source due to less organisms surviving. The dominant species is Diamesinae from the chironomid subfamily. Other species able to live in glacial streams include Orthocladiinae, which is the second dominant species in cold streams, benthic algae, periphyton, and the insect family Chironomidae.

In the summer, glacial streams experience high stream flow because of ice melt. The high flow is characterized by high turbidity and sediment transport, which reduces the biomass of the resident periphyton. At the end of summer, ice melt is reduced and stream flow decreases, causing an increase in the periphyton population.

Moreover, in similar latitude and altitude glacial stream, the beta diversity is similar and enhanced compared to non-glacial reaches.

=== Stream types ===
Alpine streams can be characterized as kyral, krenal, or rhithral, and vary in ecology.

==== Kyral ====
Kyral streams are the upper-most reach of glacial streams, located above the permanent snowline of glaciers. These streams are fed by glacial meltwater and consist of temperatures below 4°C. Low temperatures control the organisms that are found in this stream section. Generally, there are no organisms within the first few meters below the glacial input; organisms increase in their abundance and diversity downstream. Typical species of kyral streams consist of diamesine chironomids and simuliids. These organisms feed upon algae and allochthonous organic matter. No fish, angiosperms or plankton are found in this segment.

==== Krenal ====
Krenal streams (also known as springbrooks) can be found at all altitudes and receive their sources from groundwater. This water source provides the stream with a well-oxygenated environment that has constant flow and stable temperatures, varying only 1-2°C during the year. These conditions allow for a diverse community of organisms to inhabit the environment. Various types of algae, moss and tundra vegetation can be found here. Some fish, like the arctic char, rely on these streams for spawning sites in the winter months. At higher elevations, Chironomidae, specifically Diamesa, are the dominant fauna. At lower elevations, amphipods, isopods and molluscs become more dominant.

==== Rhithral ====
Rhithral stream sources come from snowmelt, causing soft water that is made up predominantly of sodium ions. The temperature varies widely, ranging from 5-10°C. The vegetation found here are mainly bryophytes, and macroalgae, such as chrysophytes, chlorophytes, cyanophytes and rhodophytes. For invertebrates, Plecoptera, Ephemeroptera, Trichoptera, Diptera, turbellarians, acarines, oligochaetes and nematodes are typically found in these streams. There are a limited number of fish species that inhabit this environment, like salmonids, and sometimes trout, catfish or darters.

== Human Impacts ==
=== Climate Change ===
Climate change induced glacial recession may reduce the effect of the seasonal stream flow, as well as impact the stream's sources of water. It is expected that with glacial recession, there will eventually be less surface water flow. This is because high alpine areas generally have almost no below ground water storage, and thus, have an absence of aquifers that could have provided the stream with a reliable alternative water source. This means that glacial streams could become intermittent in the future. Streams that have reliable water sources and do not dry up intermittently, will likely be warmer in temperature, which will allow organisms downstream to move to higher elevations and claim new territory. A study done in southeastern Alaska suggests that glacial recession will influence changes in the physical and chemical properties of coastal waters that are connected downstream from glacial streams. These changes could have serious consequences for salmon spawning, ecosystem productivity, and eutrophication.

=== Pollution ===
Alpine areas are generally seen as pristine environments, far away from human influence. However, this is not the case. Airborne contaminants, such as some pesticides, can accumulate in alpine areas and pose health risks to aquatic organisms living in these environments. Contamination by persistent organic pollutants (POPs) mostly occurs from local emissions and transport. Glacial recession of older glacial ice, containing contaminants that were deposited on the ice decades ago (eg. DDT), will enter the stream ecosystem, where it can have health implications for the organisms living in / downstream from the environment. With warmer temperatures, rapid snowmelt will lead to a greater concentration of contaminants entering the stream at once.

=== Stream Monitoring ===
Macroinvertebrates (eg. midges) are indicator species and are often examined to determine how humans are affecting the ecosystem. Unfortunately, insufficient research has been conducted for the environmental preferences of macroinvertebrates in alpine environments, increasing the difficulty of monitoring the changes in glacial streams.
