= Prograde =

Prograde can refer to:

- Retrograde and prograde motion, in astronomy, a type of motion of astronomical bodies
- Metamorphism#Prograde and retrograde, in geology, describes mineral changes in rocks under increasing pressure and/or temperature conditions
- Progradation, in geography / geomorphology, refers to the growth of a river delta
