= Minimarg =

Village in Pakistani-administered Gilgit-Baltistan

Minimarg منی مرگ
- Village
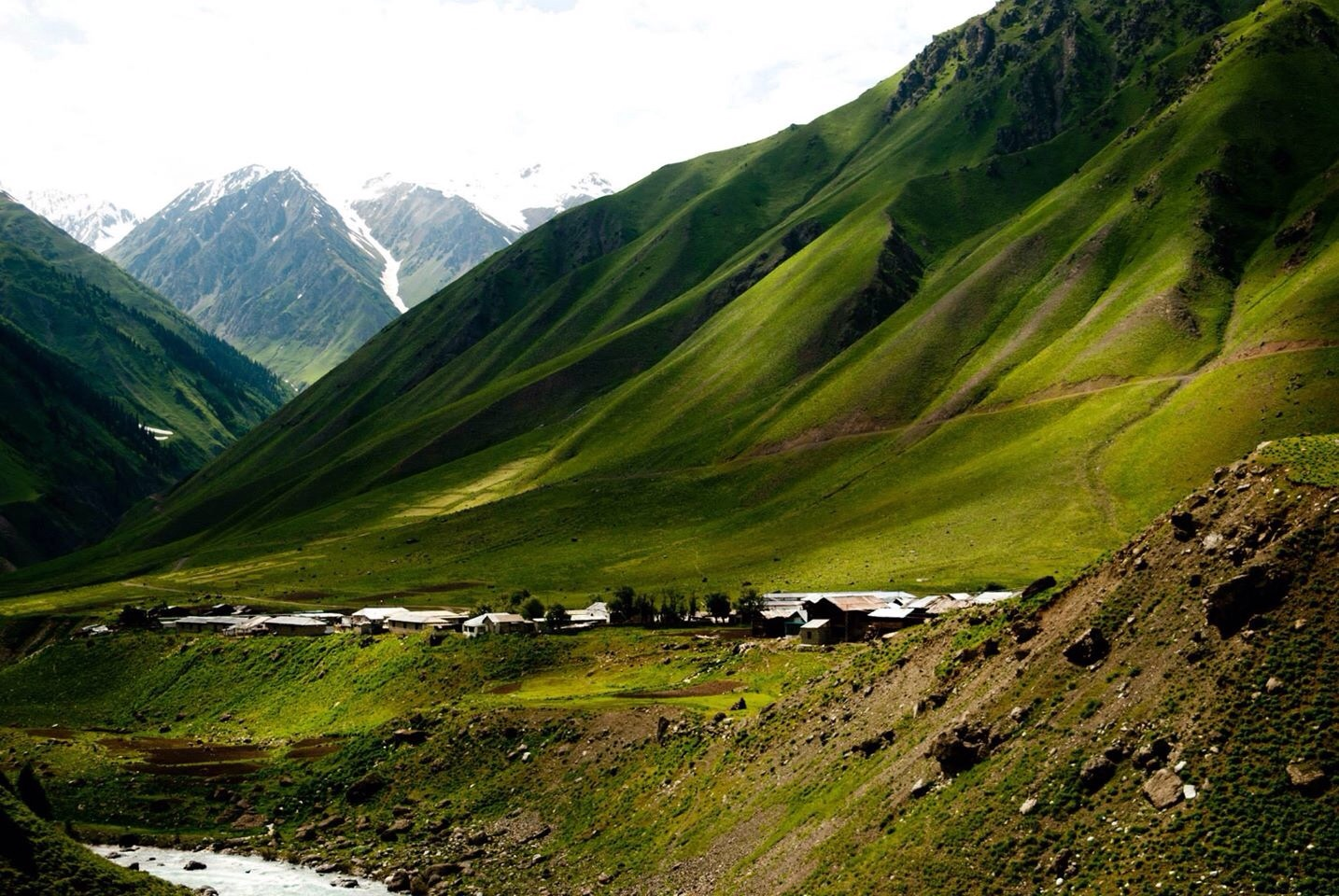
- A view of Minimarg village

- Location in Gilgit-Baltistan
- Coordinates: 34.7908°N 75.0799°E
- Country: Pakistan
- Elevation: 2,844 m (9,331 ft)
- Time zone: UTC+05:00 (PST)
- Calling code: +92 - 5817

Minimarg (Kashmiri: منٕ مرگ; Urdu: منی مرگ) is a village in the Astore District of Pakistan-administered Gilgit-Baltistan. Originally a part of Gurez Valley, the area surrounding the village was incorporated into Gilgit-Baltistan following First Kashmir War for administrative ease. It is situated on the bank of the Burzil Nala, approximately 36 kilometres (22 mi) south of the Chilam Chowki checkpost and to the north of a border village named Kamri. The village, located south of Astore Valley via the Burzil Pass, has an average elevation of 2,844 metres (9,331 ft) above sea level.

== Etymology ==
The word "Minimarg" consists of two parts of Kashmiri origin, منٕ, menee which means 'frog' and مرگ, marg which means meadow, hence the name means 'Meadow of Frogs'.

== History ==
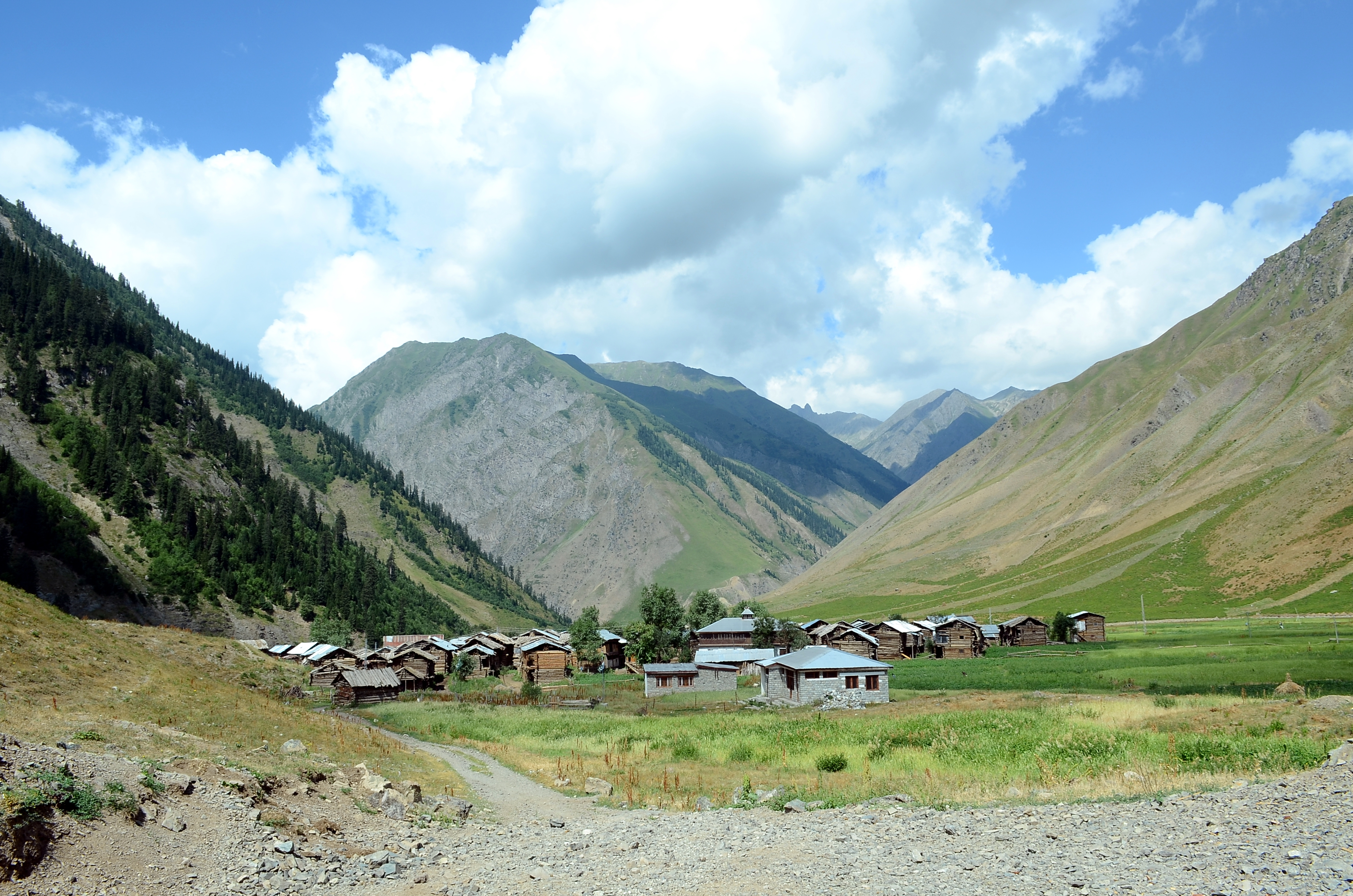
Minimarg village

Minimarg was part of Baramulla district before 1947, although it was neither geographically nor culturally or linguistically part of the Kashmir Valley During the First Kashmir War in 1947–1948, a wing of the combined Gilgit Scouts and renegade 6th Infantry of the Jammu and Kashmir State Forces, called the 'Tiger Force', took control of Minimarg, and it along with 13 other villages of Baramulla district became part of Pakistan. However, before that the area being an integral part of Gurez Valley was known as ‘Gurii’ with respect to Gurez Valley. It was also known as ‘Nain’, which means the junction place between Kashmir and Gilgit, and traders used to stay here while travelling to Kashmir and Srinagar. Historically, till 1948, the region had been an ancient trade route between Kashmir valley, and Northern Areas (Gilgit-Baltistan). Moreover, this was the only route through which students and traders used to get access to the Indian side for education and trade. As before 1960s, people of Gilgit had no access to Punjab and other parts of Pakistan, thus they greatly relied on this route.

== Language ==
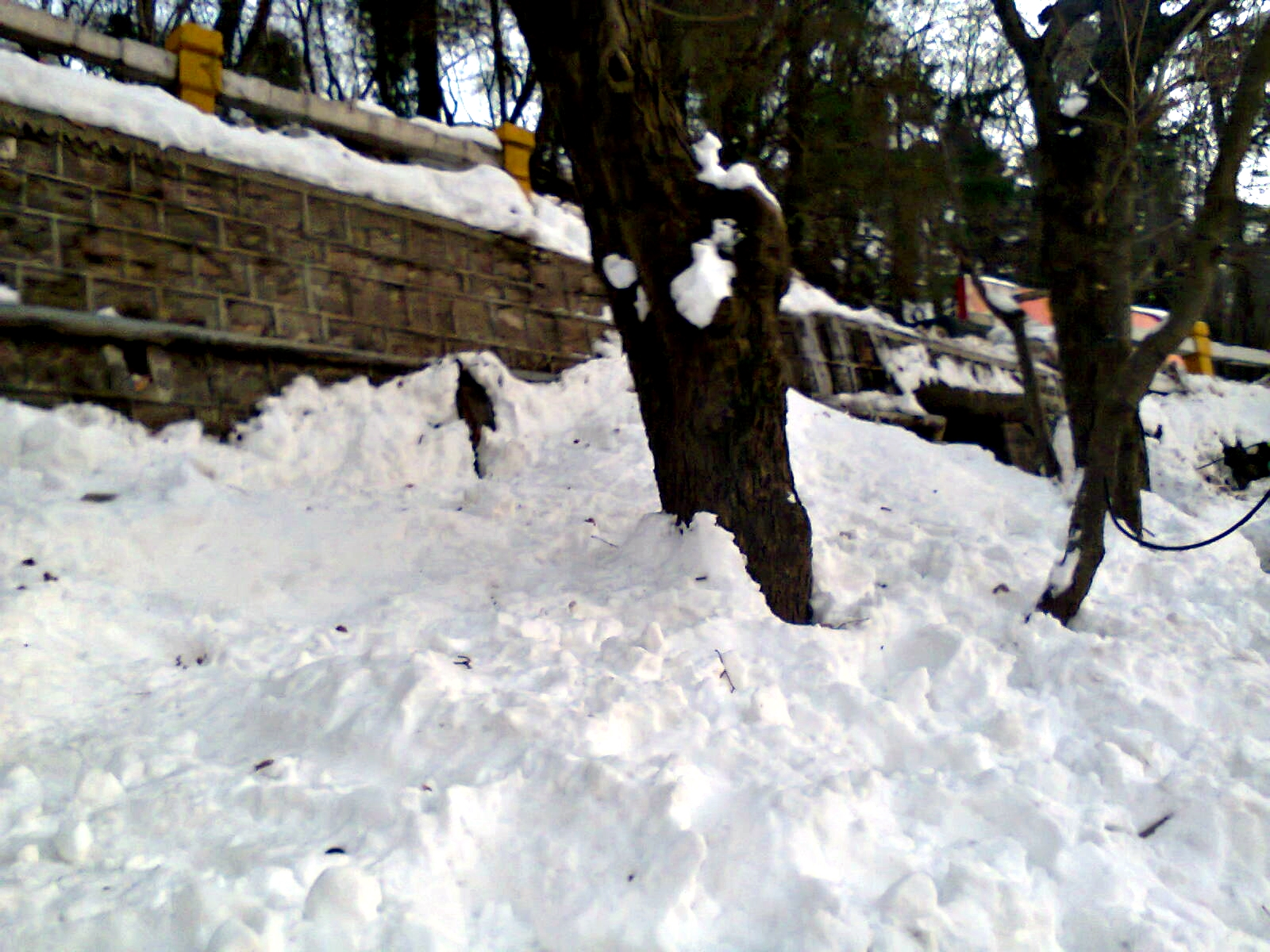
Snowfall and landslide

People living in the region speak the Shina language.

== Climate ==
July is warm with an average temperature of 19.8 °C. January is cold with an average temperature of -26.3 °C.

== See also ==
- Taobat
- Halmat
