= Astore River =

River in Pakistan

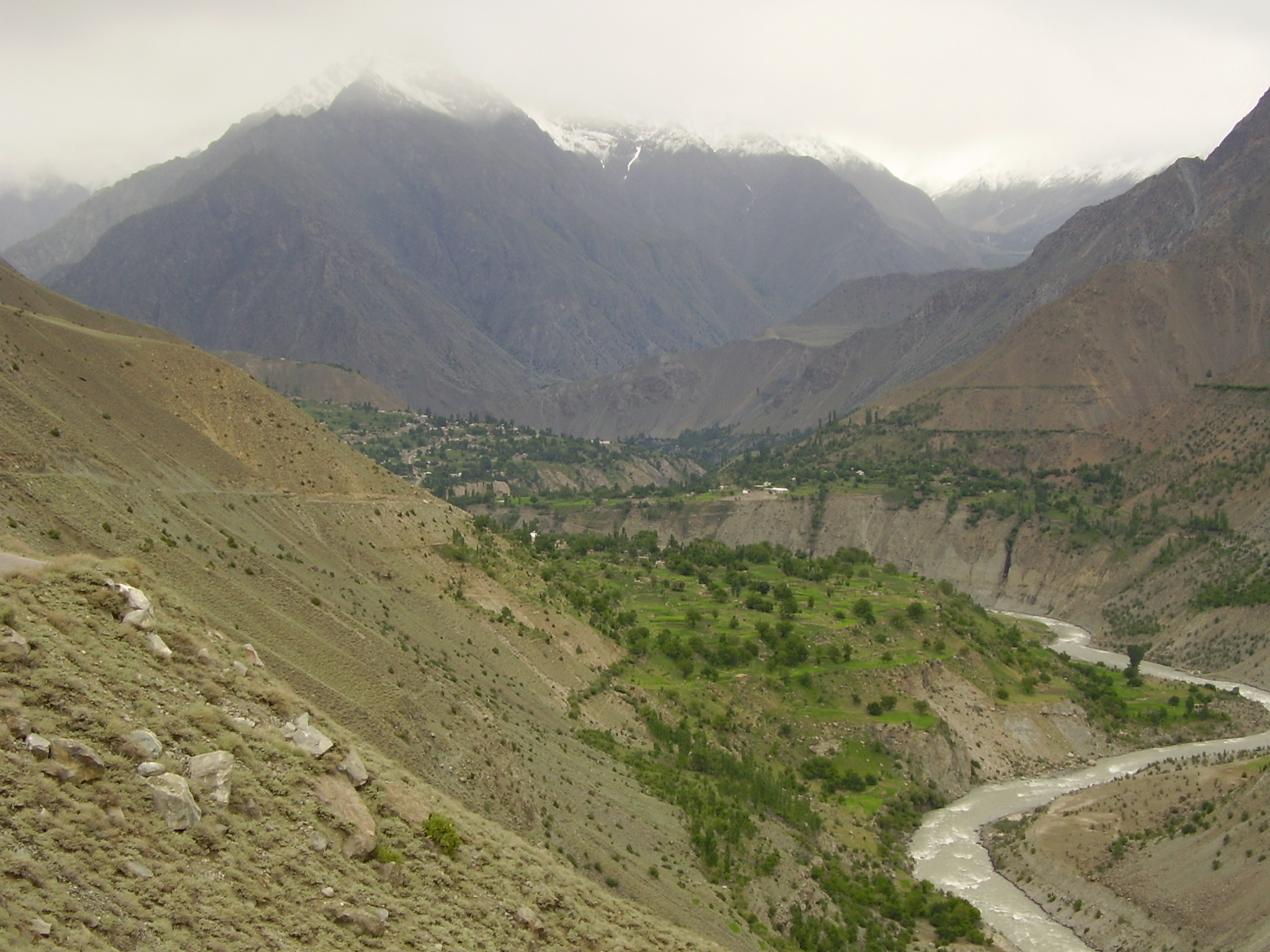

Physical characteristics
- Discharge
  - location: Doyan Gauging Station, Astore
  - average: 140 m^{3}/s (4,900 cu ft/s)
  - minimum: 37.52 m^{3}/s (1,325 cu ft/s)
  - maximum: 232.24 m^{3}/s (8,201 cu ft/s)

Astor River (Urdu: دریائے استور) is the main river flowing across the Astore Valley in Gilgit-Baltistan region of Pakistan. It is a tributary of the Indus River, and one of the rivers draining the Deosai Plateau.

== Course ==
Astore river is a tributary to the Indus River, joining the Gilgit River.

The river originates on the western slopes of Burzil Pass and flows through the eastern slope of Nanga Parbat of the western Himalaya Range. Rupal River is a major tributary of Astore. It is mainly fed by melting snow. Astore River joins Indus at coordinates 35°34′13″N 74°38′43″E.

== Hydrology ==
The catchment area of Astore River is 4,040 km^{2} (1,560 sq mi) while its mean annual discharge during the period 1981–2010 is 140 m^{3}/s (4,900 cu ft/s), with a minimum and maximum discharge of 37 m^{3}/s (1,300 cu ft/s) and 232 m^{3}/s (8,200 cu ft/s), respectively.
