= Vardayini Mata Temple =

Hindu temple

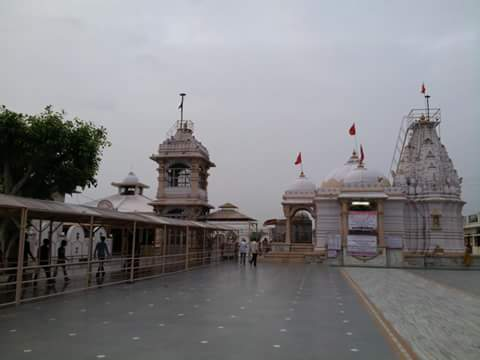

- Location within Gujarat Location within India

Religion
- Affiliation: Hinduism
- District: Gandhinagar

Location
- State: Gujarat
- Country: India
- Interactive map of Vardayini Mata Temple
- Coordinates: 23°18′36″N 72°35′49″E

Website
- http://www.rupalnipalli.org

Vardayini Mata Temple (Gujarati: વરદાયિની માતા મંદિર; Hindi: वरदायिनी माता मंदिर) is situated at Rupal, Gandhinagar and is dedicated to Goddess Vardayini Mata.

== Palli Festival ==
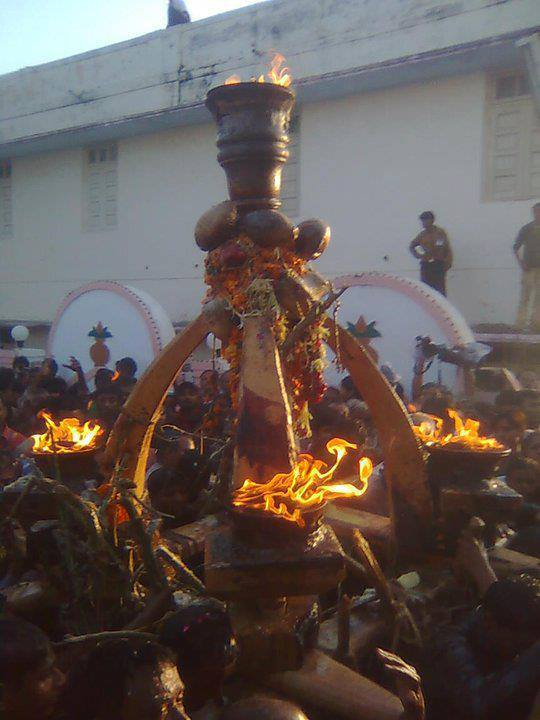
Palli Rath

Rupal village celebrates a unique festival on the ninth day of the great Navratri festival (Indian Festival of Praying to 9 different Goddesses and Dandiya Dance). On the night of the ninth day, a "Rath" of Mata Vardayini is taken out from the middle of the village and brought to the main temple.

People of the village say that this festival was started by the "Pandavs"in the time of Mahabharat. People come to the village and do prayer for their family and mainly their children.

The "Palli" is made from the wood of tree "khijada" on the same day itself. It is a wooden frame of about 8–9 feet in height with a stand to lift it. Holy fire (Akand Jyoth) is kept at 5 places on the frame, one at the top and others at the four corners of the Palli.

People of village take out the Palli from the middle of the village and palli stops at 27 spots in the village. Each spot is having tons of pure ghee or clarified butter kept ready to pour on the "Palli" Rath. These tons of pure ghee is donated by the millions of people who come to this small village to visit the Palli and take blessings of Mata Vardayini.

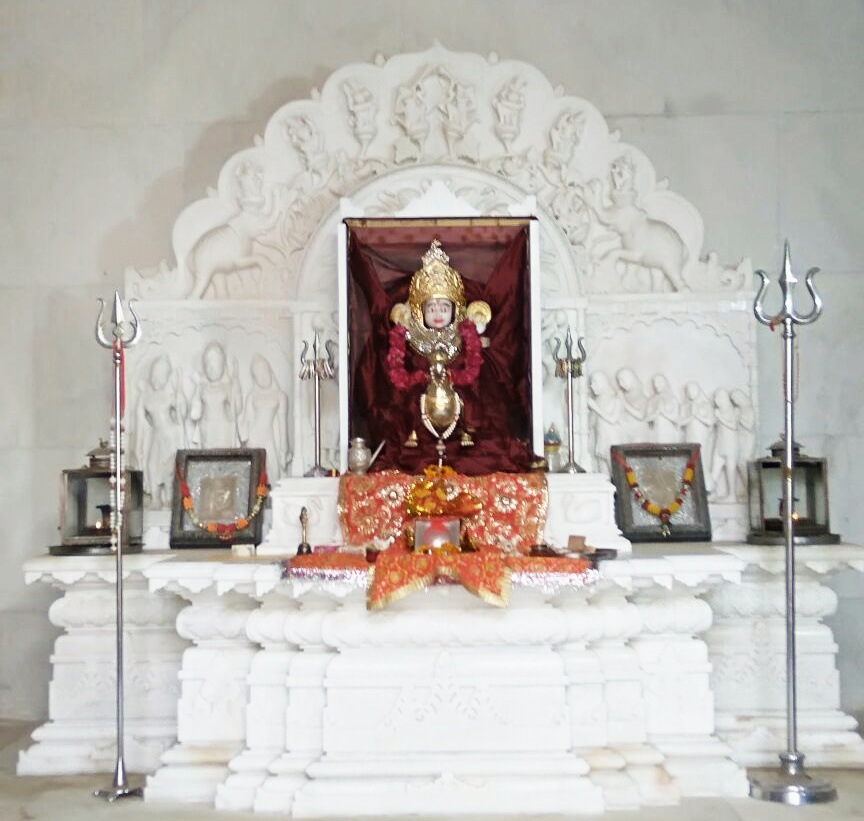
Goddess Vardayini is Hindu Goddess.
