= Rupal Peak =

Mountain in Pakistan

- Location within Pakistan

Highest point
- Elevation: 5,642 m (18,510 ft)
- Prominence: 519 m (1,703 ft)
- Coordinates: 35°08′56.05″N 74°37′7.80″E

Naming
- Native name: روپل

Geography
- Location: Rupal Valley, Astore District, Pakistan
- Parent range: Himalayas

Climbing
- First ascent: 1964
- Easiest route: Standard Route from West

Rupal Peak (Urdu: روپل) is a mountain in Pakistan's western Himalayas. The peak is located just south of the Nanga Parbat on the Rupal Valley and is sometimes climbed by mountaineers as they acclimatize for higher altitude peaks. Despite its unique beauty, steep north face and impressive height, Rupal is greatly overshadowed by Nanga Parbat, the Mazeno Wall, and the mighty Rupal Face. To its west lie Laila Peak and Shaigiri, and to its north flows the Rupal Glacier which later forms the Rupal River.

== See also ==
- List of mountains in Pakistan
