= Progradation =

Growth of a river delta into the sea over time

In sedimentary geology and geomorphology, progradation is the growth of a river delta further out into the sea over time. This occurs when the volume of incoming sediment is greater than the volume of the delta that is lost through subsidence, sea-level rise, or erosion.

Progradation can be caused by:

- Periods of sea-level fall which result in marine regression. This can occur during major continental glaciations within ice ages, be caused by changes in the rates of seafloor spreading that affects the volume of the ocean basins, or tectonic effects on the regional mantle density structure which can change the geoid elevation.
- Extremely high sediment input, such as by the Huang He (Yellow River) in China, which drains the Loess Plateau, or from high sediment loads in proglacial rivers.

== See also ==
- Retrogradation – Movement of the front of a river delta inland over time
- Aggradation – Increase in land elevation due to the deposition of sediment
- Marine transgression – Geologic event in which sea level rises relative to the land
- Sedimentology – Study of natural sediments and their formation processes
- Stratigraphy – Study of rock layers and their formation
- Sequence stratigraphy – Study and analysis of groups of sedimentary deposits
- Sediment transport – Movement of solid particles, typically by gravity and fluid entrainment
