= Halmat =

Village in Azad Jammu and Kashmir

- Village
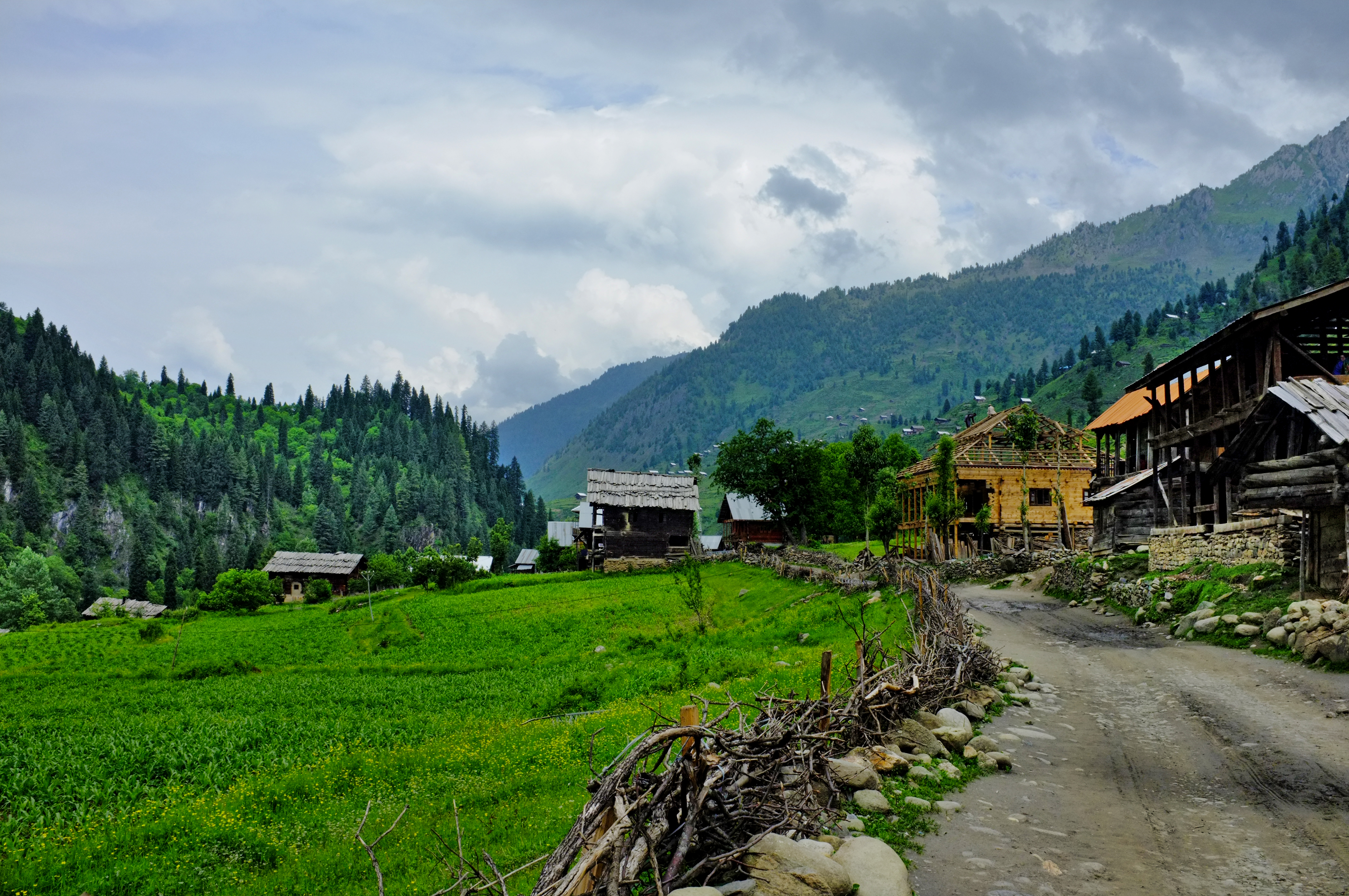
- Halmat Village, Neelam Valley

- Location within Azad Kashmir
- Coordinates: 34.7526°N 74.6596°E
- Country: Pakistan
- State: Azad Kashmir
- District: Neelam
- Elevation: 2,300 m (7,400 ft)

Languages
  - Official: Urdu
  - Local: Kashmiri
- Time zone: PST

Halmat (Urdu: ہلمت) is a village in Neelam Valley, Azad Kashmir, Pakistan. It is located 189 kilometers (117 mi) from Muzaffarabad and 34 kilometers (21 mi) from Kel at the altitude of 7,400 feet (2,300 m).

Halmat was part of Baramulla district before 1947, although it was neither geographically nor culturally or linguistically part of the Kashmir Valley

== See also ==
- Taobat
- Minimarg
