= Rupal Valley =

Valley in Gilgit Baltistan, Pakistan

Rupal Valley وادی روپل
- Valley
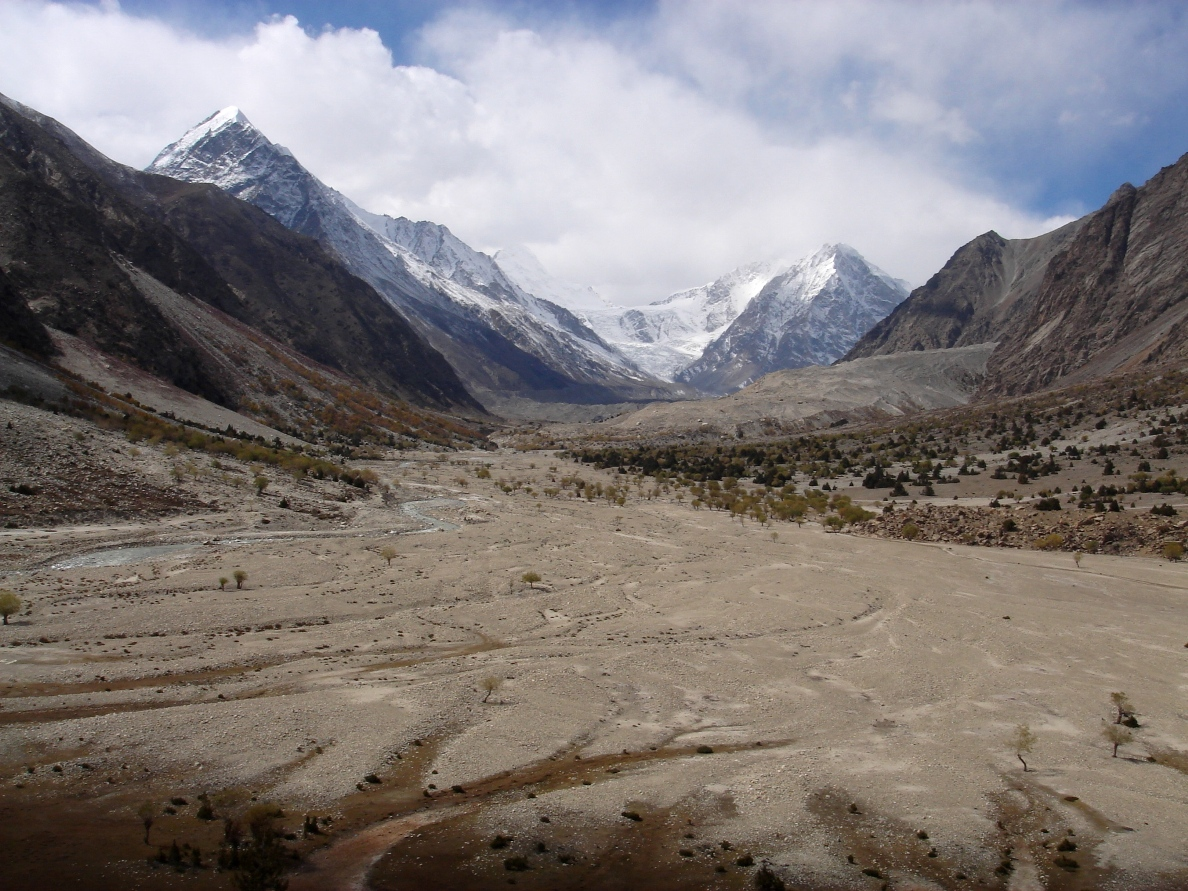

- Location within Gilgit Baltistan Location within Pakistan
- Coordinates: 35°13′38.76″N 74°42′26.60″E
- Country: Pakistan
- Adm. Unit: Gilgit-Baltistan
- District: Astore District
- Time zone: UTC+5 (PST)

The Rupal Valley (Urdu: وادی روپل) is a valley located in the Astore District of Gilgit-Baltistan region in Pakistan. It lies on the southern side of Nanga Parbat, and is accessed via the Astore Valley, which leaves the Karakoram Highway at Juglot, some 60 kilometres (37 miles) south of Gilgit.

== Peaks located in the Rupal Valley ==
- Nanga Parbat
- Rupal Peak
- Shaigiri
- Laila Peak (Rupal Valley)

== See also ==
- Rupal River
- Rupal Glacier
- Rupal Peak
