= Chongra Peak =

Peak in the Himalayas range in Pakistan

Chongra Peak چونگرا چوٹی
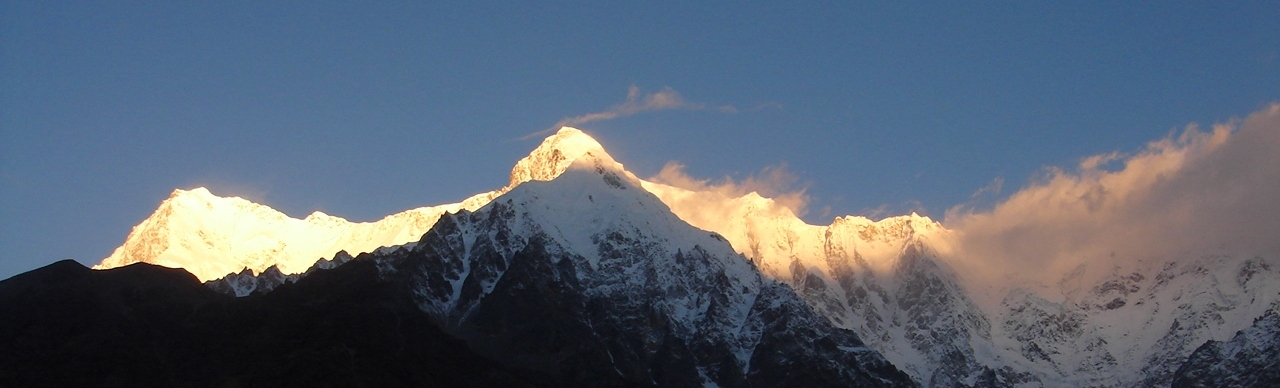
- A high ridge connecting Chongra Peak to Nanga Parbat

Highest point
- Elevation: 6,830 m (22,410 ft)
- Prominence: 683 m (2,241 ft)
- Listing: Mountains of Pakistan
- Coordinates: 35°19′34.61″N 74°40′39.46″E

Geography
- Location within Gilgit Baltistan Location within Pakistan
- Location: Astore District, Gilgit–Baltistan, Pakistan
- Parent range: Himalayas

Chongra Peak (Urdu: چونگرا چوٹی) is a peak in the Himalayas range of Asia. Located in Gilgit–Baltistan, Pakistan, it is one of the many subsidiary summits of the Nanga Parbat massif.

The peak lies just south of the Indus River, in Pakistan. Not far to the north is the western end of the Karakoram range.

== Layout of the mountain ==
From the article: Nanga Parbat

The core of Nanga Parbat is a long ridge trending southwest–northeast. The southwestern portion of this main ridge is known as the Mazeno Ridge, and has a number of subsidiary peaks. In the other direction, the main ridge starts as the East Ridge before turning northeast at Rakhiot Peak (7070m). The south/southeast side of the mountain is dominated by the Rupal Face, noted above. The north/northwest side of the mountain, leading to the Indus, is more complex. It is split into the Diamir (west) face and the Rakhiot (north) face by a long ridge. There are a number of subsidiary summits, including the North Peak (7816m) some 3 km north of the main summit. Chongra Peak itself is located at the far east end of the massif, directly north of the village of Tarashing and the upper Astore Valley.

== See also ==
- Highest mountains of the world
