= Burzil Pass =

Pakistani mountain pass

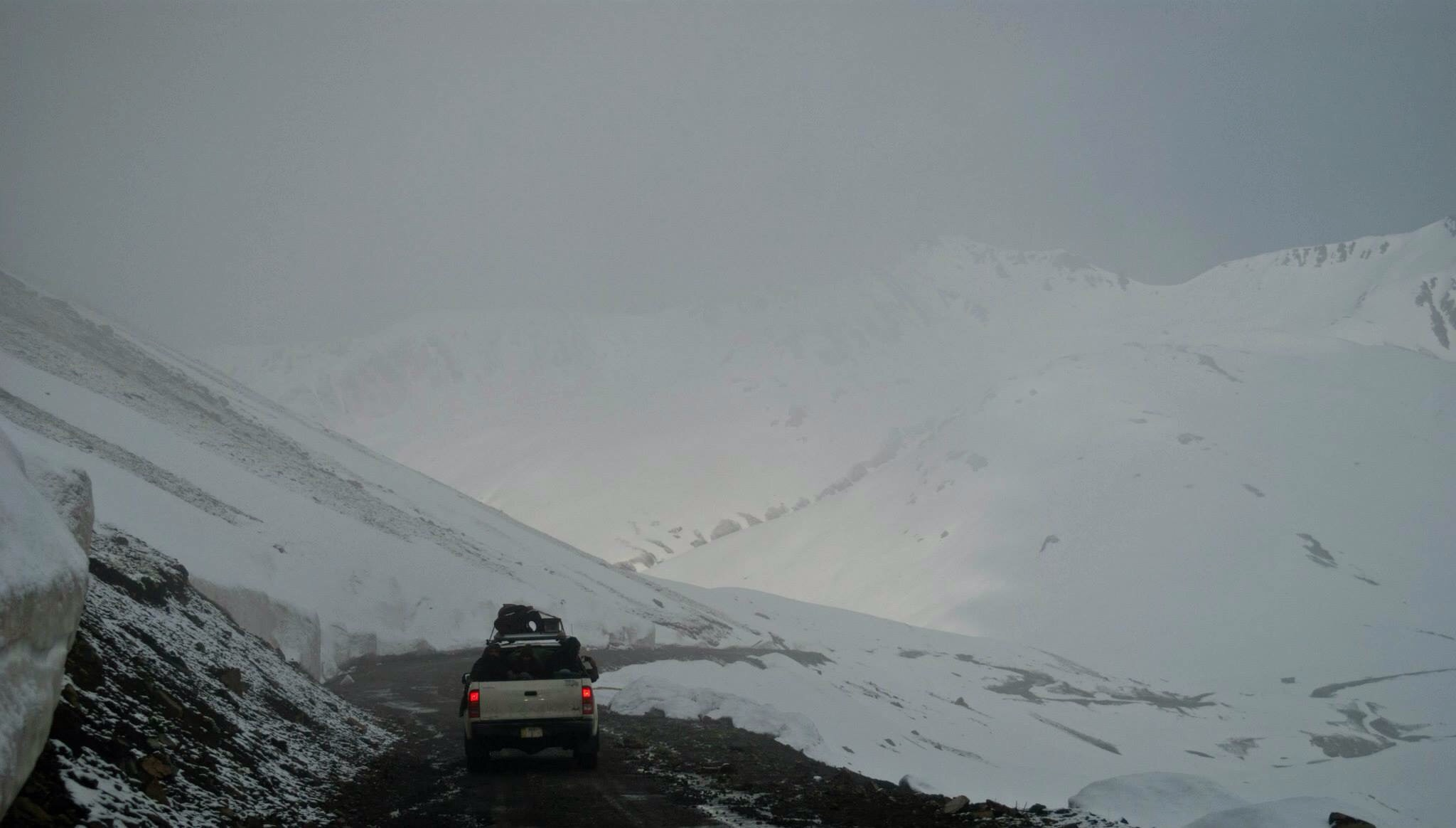
- Part of the route through the Burzil Pass in Gilgit-Baltistan

- Location within Gilgit Baltistan
- Interactive map of Burzil Pass
- Elevation: 4,100 m (13,500 ft)
- Length: 46 mi (74 km)

Third Approach
- Location: Gilgit-Baltistan, Pakistan
- Range: Himalayas
- Coordinates: 34°54′00″N 75°06′00″E

The Burzil Pass (el. 4,100 m or 13,500 ft, Urdu: درۂ برزیل) is a mountain pass in northern Pakistan, located approximately 5 kilometres (3.1 mi) north of the administrative line between the Pakistani-administered territories of Gilgit-Baltistan and Azad Jammu and Kashmir, and some 30 kilometres (19 mi) north of the Line of Control (LoC), which serves as the de facto border between Pakistan and Indian-administered portions in the disputed Kashmir region.

It is a part of the historic caravan route between the cities of Srinagar and Gilgit. While the Burzil route ran freely through Jammu and Kashmir during British rule in India, major sections were largely closed off by Pakistan following the First Kashmir War, which saw the division by a ceasefire line of the former princely state and the start of an ongoing territorial conflict over the region. The crest of the pass is wide and covered with lush alpine grass vegetation during the summer. The Astore River originates from the western slopes of the Burzil Pass.

It is the oldest-known route connecting Gilgit with Skardu and Srinagar through the Deosai Plateau. Ancient travellers are believed to have extensively crossed the pass by horse. At the beginning of the 20th century, a hut was built on the crest of the pass, where couriers delivered mail and messages from British India to China.

The city of Gilgit is located some 367 kilometres (228 mi) from Srinagar by road via the Burzil Pass above the northern banks of Wular Lake and Gurez in the Indian-administered territory of Jammu and Kashmir.

== Popular culture ==
- American naturalist and author William Douglas Burden described crossing the Burzil Pass in the chapter "Savage Abadabur" of his book, Look to the Wilderness.
