= Rupal, Gandhinagar =

Rupal
- Village
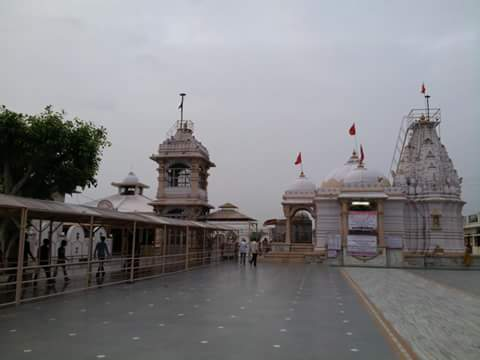
- Vardayini Mata Temple

- Location in Gujarat, India Rupal (India)
- Coordinates: 23.310°N 72.597°E
- Country: India
- State: Gujarat
- District: Gandhinagar

Languages
  - Official: Gujarati, Hindi, English
- Time zone: UTC+5:30 (IST)
- PIN: 382630
- Telephone code: 02716
- Vehicle registration: GJ-18
- Website: www.rupalnipalli.org

Rupal is a village in Gandhinagar district of Gujarat state, India. It is located 13 km towards north from District headquarters Gandhinagar. Gujarati is the local language.

== Culture ==
=== Palli Festival ===
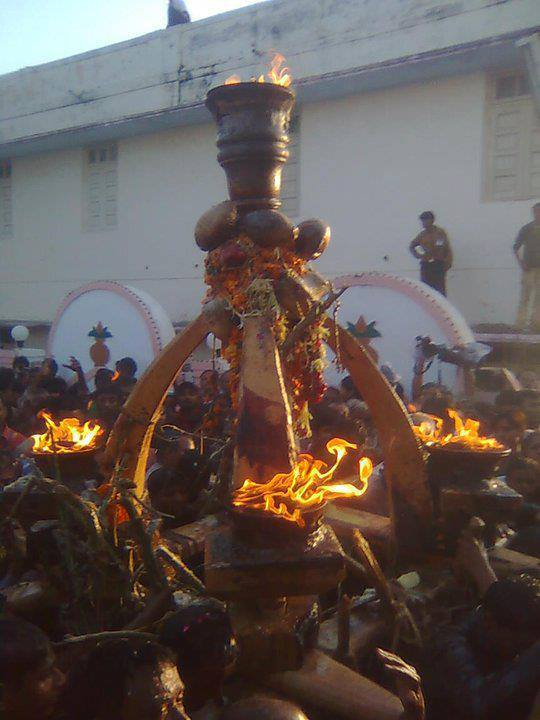
Palli Rath

Rupal village celebrates unique festival on the ninth day of the great festival Navratri (Indian Festival of Praying to 9 different Goddesses and Garba and Dandiya Dance). On the night of ninth day, a "Rath" of Goddess Vardayini is built and then it is being decorated like a bride. The chariot is then starts the journey from a place called palli vas of Rupal village and ends at main temple of Goddess Vardayini.

People of the village say that, This festival has been started by the "Pandavs" since the time of Mahabharat. People come to the village and do prayer for their family and mainly their small children.

The "Palli" is a made from the wood of tree "khijada" on the same day itself. It is a wooden frame of about 8–9 feet height with stand to lift it. Holy fire (Akand Jyoth) kept at 5 places on the frame, one at the top and other at the four corners of the Palli.

People of village take out the Palli from the middle of the village and Palli stops at 27 spots in the village. Each spot is having tons of pure ghee or clarified butter kept ready to pour on the "Palli" Rath. This quantity of pure ghee is donated by the millions of people who come to this small village to visit the Palli and take blessings of Mata Vardayini.

== Places to see ==
- Vardayini Mata Temple

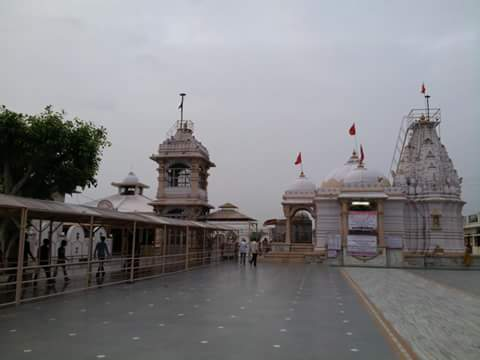
Vardayini Mata Old Temple

- Varahi Mata Temple
- Borij Mata Temple

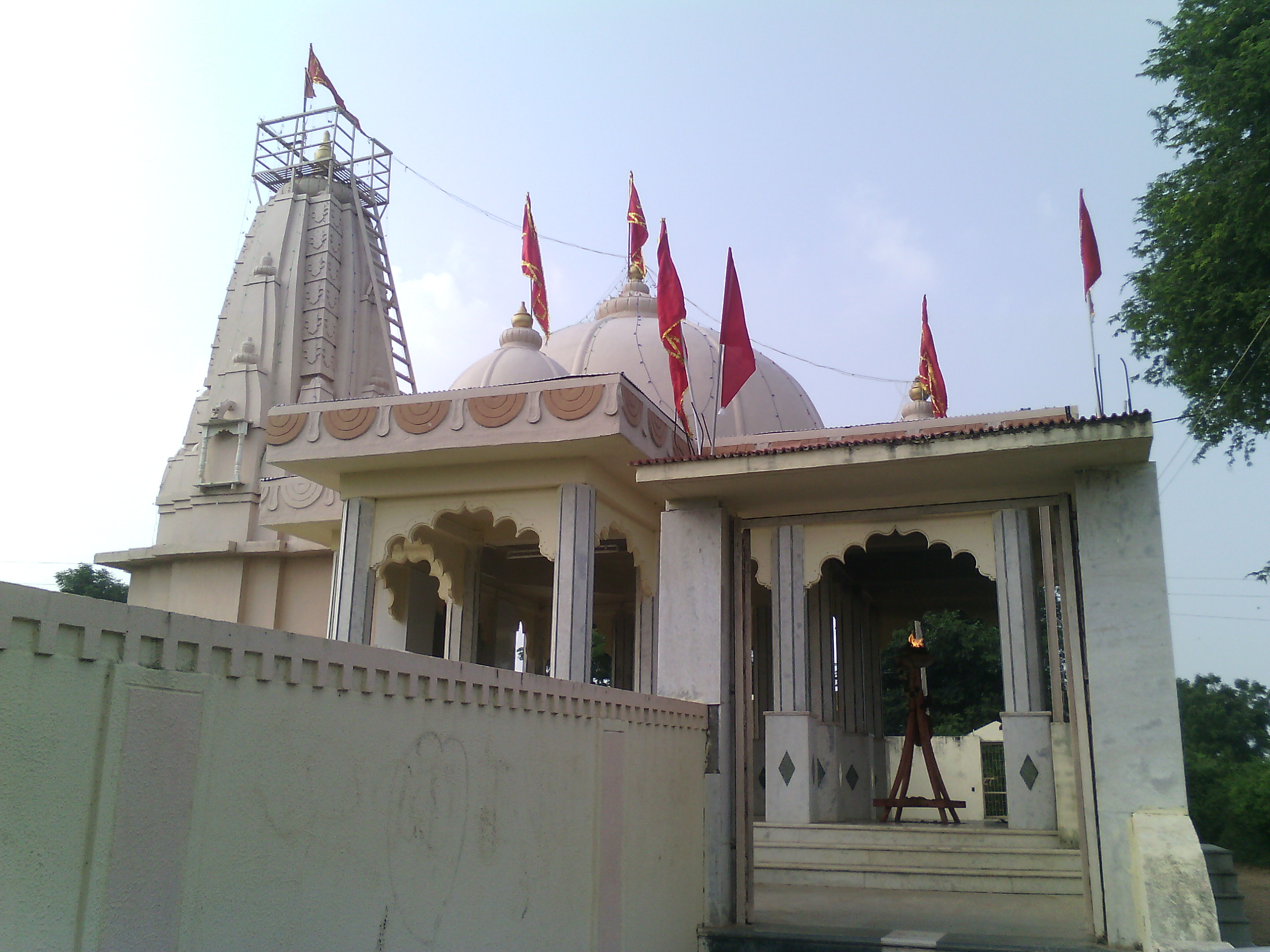
Borij Mata Temple

- Moto Maadh
- Ramji Temple
- Guru Gorakhnathji Aashram

== Population ==
Rupal is a large village located in Gandhinagar district, Gujarat, with total 1323 families residing. The Rupal village has population of 6587 of which 3406 are males while 3181 are females as per Population Census 2011.

In Rupal village population of children with age 0–6 is 728 which makes up 11.05% of total population of village. Average sex ratio of Rupal village is 934 which is higher than Gujarat state average of 919. Child sex ratio for the Rupal as per census is 829, lower than Gujarat average of 890.

Rupal village has higher literacy rate compared to Gujarat. In 2011, literacy rate of Rupal village was 81.86% compared to 78.03% of Gujarat. In Rupal Male literacy stands at 89.23% while female literacy rate was 74.08%.

As per constitution of India and Panchyati Raaj Act, Rupal village is administrated by Sarpanch (Head of Village) who is elected representative of village.

== Transportation ==
There is a bus-station of Gujarat State Road Transport Corporation (GSRTC) connecting to Gandhinagar & Kalol and a railway station is at Gandhinagar, capital of Gujarat State.

=== Road ===
Rupal can be reached through Mahudi–Gandhinagar Road. On that road take left from Pethapur Cross Road. (If you are coming from Gandhinagar, otherwise take right)

The other road which passes through is Kalol to Mehsana.

=== Rail ===
The nearest railway station of Rupal is at Gandhinagar Junction, which comes under the administrative control of Western Railway zone of the Indian Railways. It has direct rail links on the broad gauge to the cities of Chennai, Thiruvananthapuram, Mysore, Ahmedabad, Pune, Mumbai, Jaipur, Jodhpur, Delhi, Dehradun, Muzaffarpur, Bareilly and Jammu. It is connected to most of the cities and towns in Gujarat such as Ahmedabad, Surat, Vadodara, Bhuj, Rajkot, Jamnagar and Porbandar.

=== Air ===
The nearest International Airport is Sardar Vallabhbhai Patel International Airport, Ahmedabad which is 34 km far from Rupal Village.
