= Proglacial river =

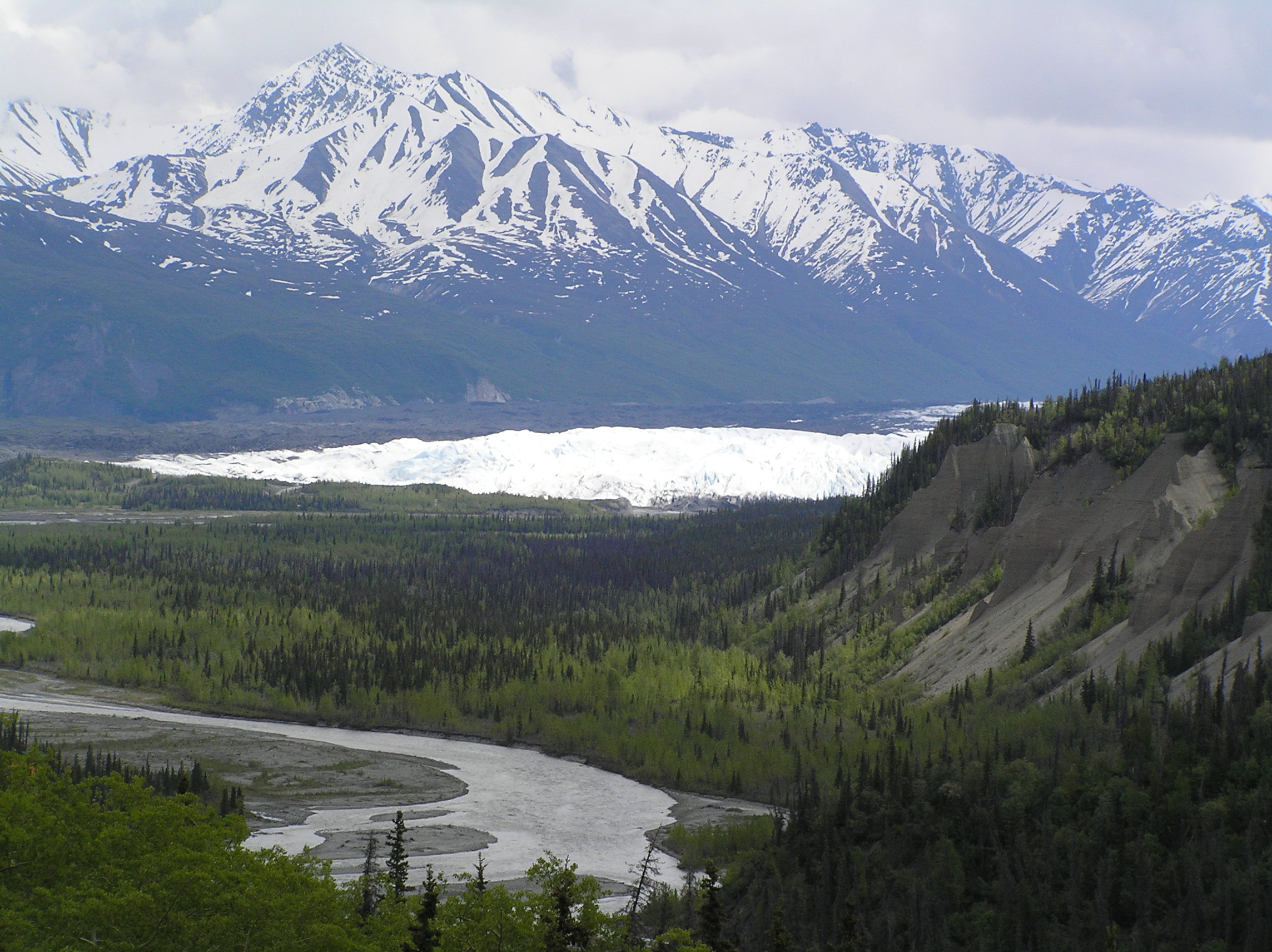
A proglacial river in front of Matanuska Glacier in Alaska, USA.

A proglacial river is a river that flows from the margin of a glacier. These rivers are strongly affected by the highly-seasonal water supply from the glacier and by the large supply of sediment that arrives at the glacier terminus. This high sediment supply often makes them steep and braided. Many modern proglacial rivers drain glaciers in the mountain ranges of Alaska and the Himalayas. Past and present proglacial rivers in front of large ice sheets deposited large outwash plains of sediment.
