= Rakhiot Peak =

Mountain in Gilgit-Baltistan, Pakistan

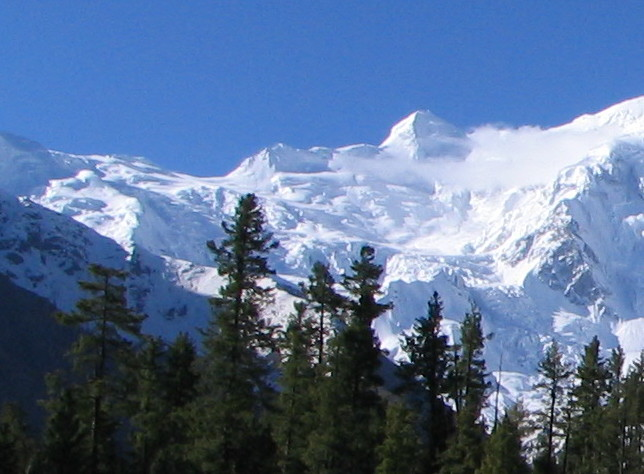
- Rakhiot Peak, slightly right of centre, seen from the north

Highest point
- Elevation: 7,070 m (23,200 ft)
- Prominence: 213 m (699 ft)
- Parent peak: Nanga Parbat I
- Listing: List of mountains in Pakistan
- Coordinates: 35°15′32″N 74°38′15″E

Geography
- Location within Gilgit Baltistan Location within Pakistan
- Location: Gilgit-Baltistan, Pakistan
- Parent range: Himalayas

Climbing
- First ascent: July 16, 1932 by Peter Aschenbrenner (Austria) and Herbert Kunigk (Germany)

Rakhiot Peak is a peak in the Himalayas range of the Gilgit-Baltistan, Pakistan. It is one of the many subsidiary summits of the Nanga Parbat massif.

== Location ==
It lies just south of the Indus River in Diamer District. Not far to the north is the western end of the Karakoram range.

== Layout of the mountain ==
The core of Nanga Parbat is a long ridge trending southwest–northeast. The southwestern portion of this main ridge is known as the Mazeno Ridge, and has a number of subsidiary peaks. In the other direction from the summit, the main ridge starts as the East Ridge before turning more northeast at Rakhiot Peak (7,070 m), about 4 km northeast of the Nanga Parbat summit. The Silver Saddle (Silbersackel) is about halfway between Rakhiot Peak and Nanga Parbat summit. The south/southeast side of the mountain is dominated by the Rupal Face, often referred to as the highest mountain face in the world: it rises an incredible 4,600 m (15,100 feet) above its base. The north/northwest side of the mountain, leading to the Indus, is more complex. It is split into the Diamir (west) face and the Rakhiot (north) face by a long ridge. There are a number of subsidiary summits, including the North Peak (7,816 m) some 3 km north of the main summit.

== See also ==
- Nanga Parbat
- Eight-thousander
- List of highest mountains on Earth
