= Silberzacken =

Subsidiary peak of Nanga Parbat, Pakistan

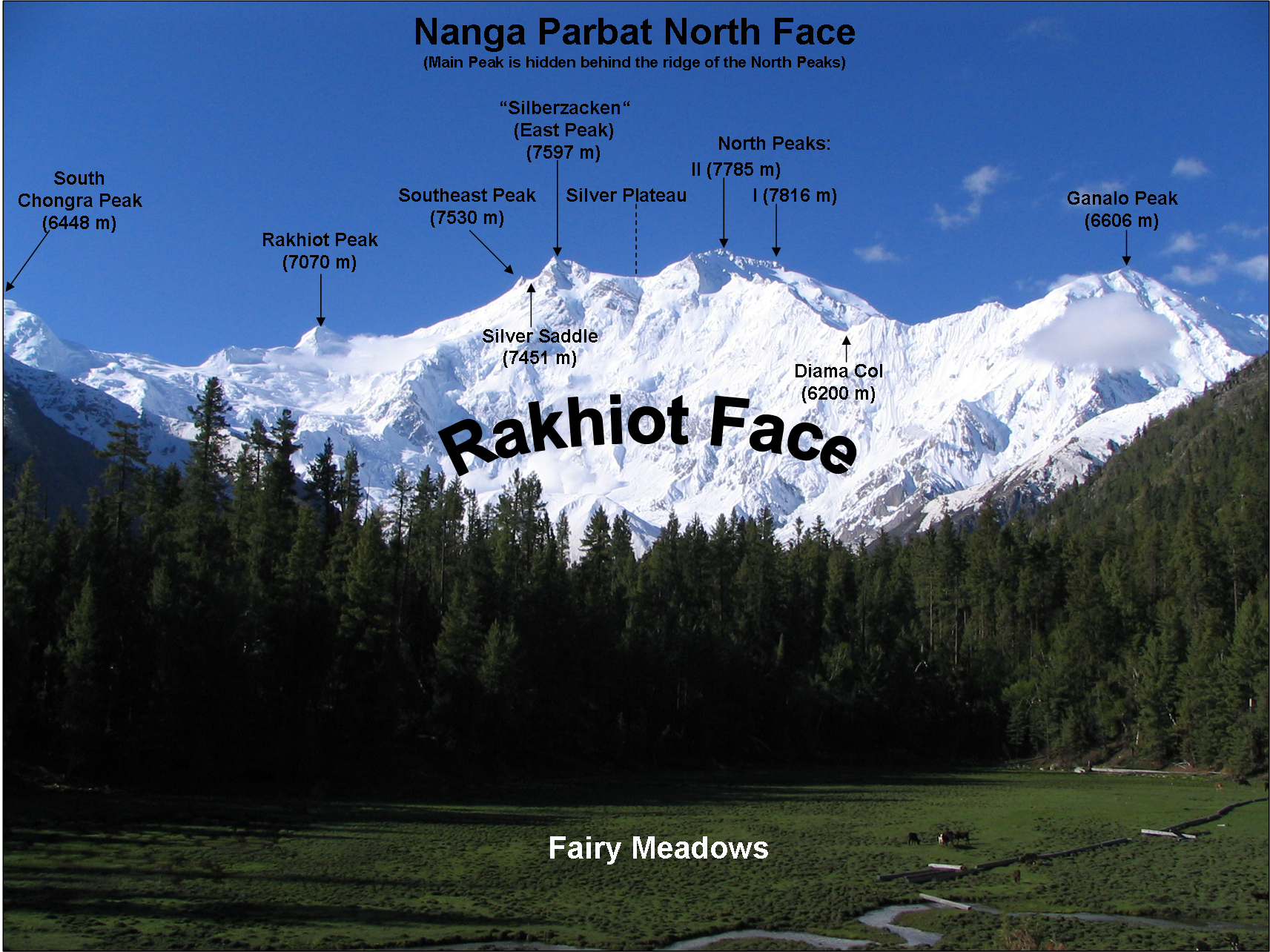
- The Rakhiot face of the mountain showing Silberzacken and other peaks.

Highest point
- Elevation: 7,597 m (24,925 ft)
- Listing: Mountains of Pakistan
- Coordinates: 35°15′48″N 74°36′28″E

Naming
- Native name: سِلبَرزاکِن (Urdu)

Geography
- Location within Pakistan
- Location: Gilgit-Baltistan, Pakistan
- Parent range: Himalayas

Climbing
- First ascent: Unclimbed

Silberzacken (Urdu: سلبرزاکن), also known as East Peak, is a 7,597 metres (24,925 ft) high subsidiary peak of Nanga Parbat in the Himalayan Range in Gilgit-Baltistan, Pakistan.

== Location and layout ==
Silberzacken is located on a ridge in the Himalayan Range, south of the Indus River in the Diamer District of Gilgit–Baltistan in Pakistan. The ridge has three faces; Diamir, Rakhiot, and Rupal. The south and southeast side of the mountain is dominated by the Rupal face, while the north and northwest side of the mountain is split into Diamir face in the west and Rakhiot face in the north.
