= Rupal River =

Glacial river in Gilgit-Baltistan, Pakistan

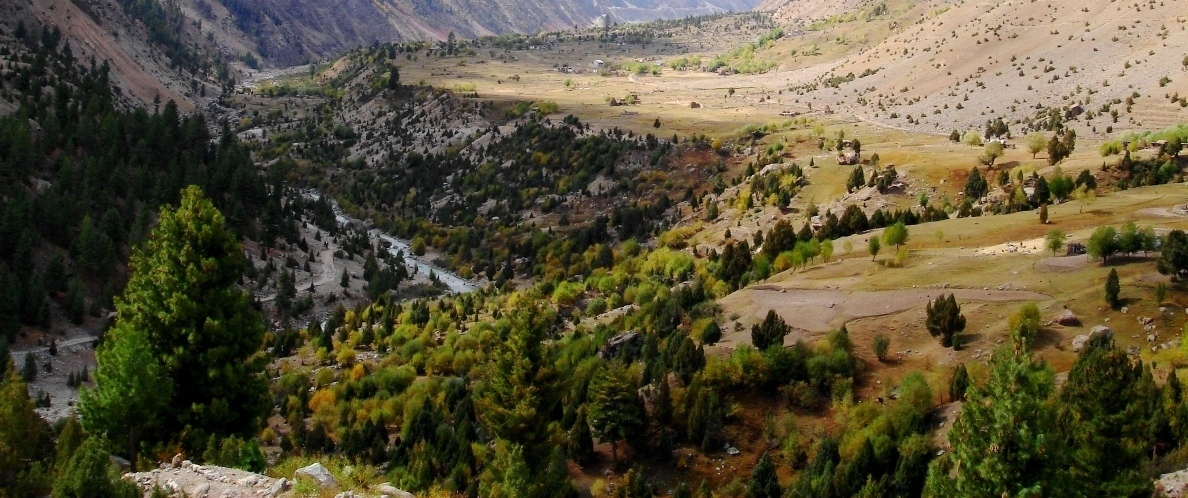
Rupal River as seen from the Lower Rupal Valley.

The Rupal River (Urdu: دریائے روپل) is an east–west glacial stream rising from the meltwater of the Rupal Glacier in Gilgit-Baltistan region of northern Pakistan. The stream flows through the Rupal Valley, south of Nanga Parbat, before turning northeast to the village of Tarashing. The Rupal drains into the Astore River, which eventually reaches the Indus near Jaglot.

== See also ==
- Rupal Valley
- Rupal Glacier
- Astore Valley
