= Tarishing =

Village in Gilgit-Baltistan, Pakistan

Tarishing تری شنگ Tashing
- Village
- Location within Gilgit Baltistan Location within Pakistan
- Coordinates: 35.238°N 74.728°E
- Country: Pakistan
- Adm. Unit: Gilgit-Baltistan
- District: Astore District
- Elevation: 2,900 m (9,500 ft)

Population
  - Total: c. 200
- Time zone: UTC+5:00 (PKT)

Tarishing (Urdu: تری شنگ) is a village in and a subdivision of the Astore District of Gilgit-Baltistan region in Pakistan.

It is considered to be the gateway to Nanga Parbat, the ninth-highest mountain in the world. Its strategic location makes it an essential starting point for trekkers and mountaineers embarking on Nanga Parbat expeditions.

With a population of 400, the village has around 40 shops, one boys' high school, one girls' high school, one private school, five hotels and a 10-bed hospital . A large glacier beside the Rupal River is also adjacent to this village, which is situated at an altitude of about 2,900 meters.

== Climate ==
In summer (May–October), the village has a warm but moderate climate, although nights are cold the entire year-round. In winter (November–April), snowfall may reach up to 6 ft (1.8 m) and temperatures reach down to about −20 °C (−4 °F) on average.

== Languages ==
The predominant languages spoken amongst the native population of this village are Shina and Urdu and also understand English.
