= Astore Valley =

Valley in Gilgit-Baltistan

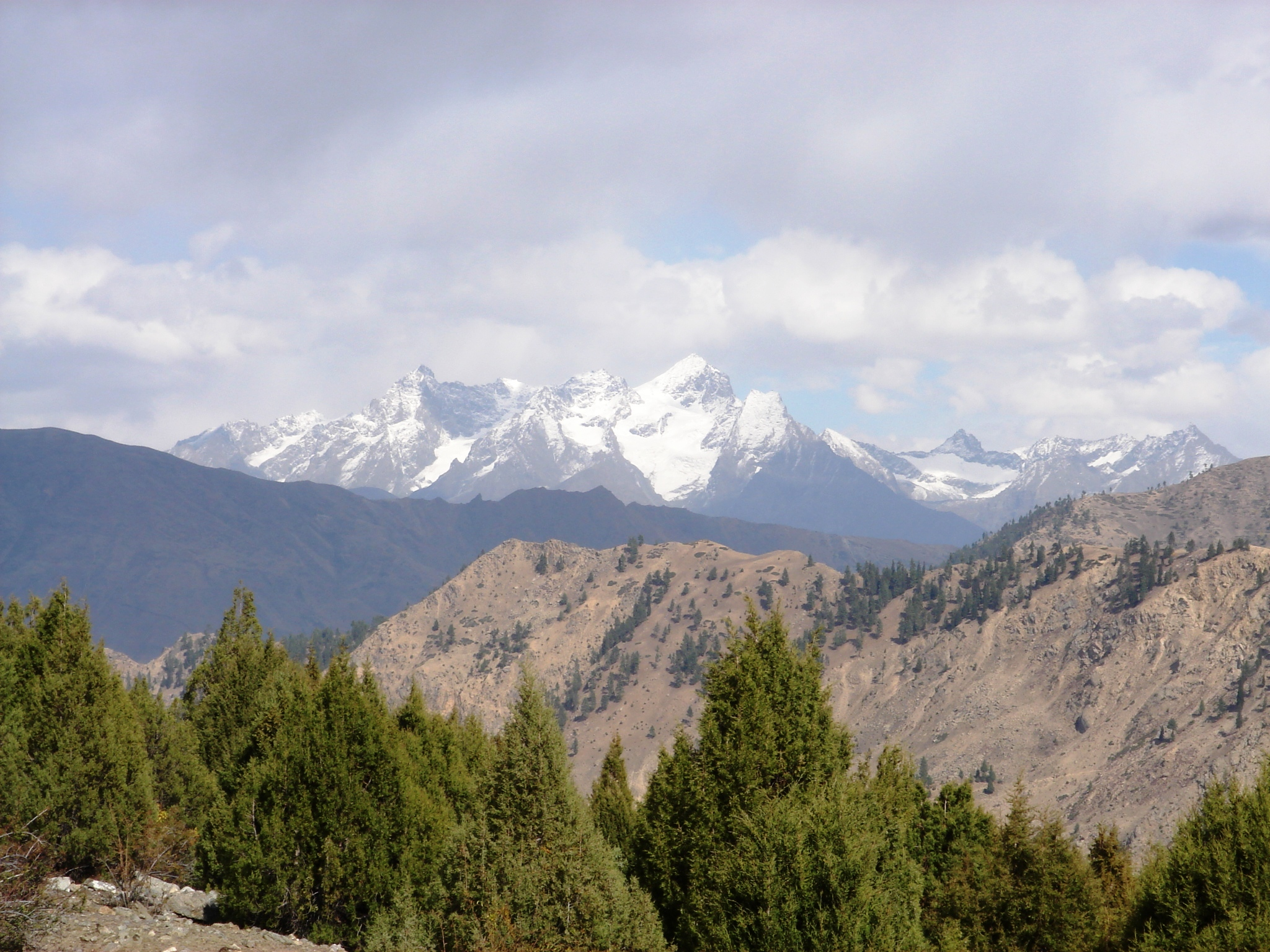
- Photograph of an unnamed, 5400-metre peak raising jagged, snow-clad ramparts above the Astore Valley

- Location within Gilgit Baltistan Location within Pakistan
- Floor elevation: 2,600 m (8,500 ft)
- Length: 120 km (75 mi)

Naming
- Native name: وادی استور (Urdu)

Geography
- Coordinates: 35°02′20.3″N 75°06′36.9″E
- Interactive map of Astore Valley

The Astore Valley (Urdu: وادی استور; el. 2,600 m (8,500 ft)) is a valley located in the Astore District of Gilgit-Baltistan region in Pakistan.

== History ==
Astore was conquered by Ali Sher Khan Anchan, (ruled 1595–1633), the Maqpon ruler of Skardu. He gave it to Shah Sultan, his grandson. Shah Sultan became progenitor of the line of Astore rulers, who maintained their internal independence until 1842, when it annexed by Sikh Empire. In 1846, Astore became a part of the princely state of Jammu and Kashmir. After Gilgit Rebellion it became a part of Pakistan. It was granted district status in 2004.

== See also ==
- Rama Lake
- Minimarg Valley
- Rupal Valley
- Tarishing
- Deosai National Park
