= Rupal Glacier =

Mountain glacier in Gilgit-Baltistan, Pakistan

- Location within Karakoram Location within Gilgit Baltistan Location within Pakistan
- Interactive map of Rupal Glacier
- Location: Gilgit-Baltistan, Pakistan
- Coordinates: 35°06′N 74°24′E

Rupal Glacier or Toshain Glacier is an alpine glacier in the Great Himalaya subrange of Himalayas in Gilgit-Baltistan, northern Pakistan. Ranging an elevation of 3,730 metres (12,240 ft) to 6,300 metres (20,700 ft), it starts north of Toshain Peak with height of 6,270-metre-high (20,570 ft) (35°8′35.93″N 74°24′52.46″E) and flows northeastward, north of Laila Peak (Rupal Valley) with a height of 5,971 metres (19,590 ft) high and south of Nanga Parbat's many peaks. The meltwater from the glacier forms Rupal River.

== See also ==
- List of glaciers
