= Moma =

Moma may refer to:

== People ==
- Moma Clarke (1869–1958), British journalist
- Moma Marković (1912–1992), Serbian politician
- Momčilo Rajin (born 1954), Serbian art and music critic, theorist and historian, artist and publisher

== Places ==
Angola

- Moma, Angola

Mozambique

- Moma District, Nampula

Russia

- Moma District, Russia, Sakha Republic
- Moma Natural Park, a protected area in Moma District
- Moma (river), a tributary of the Indigirka in Sakha Republic
- Moma Range, in Sakha Republic

United States

- Museum of Modern Art (MoMA), an art museum in New York City

== Transport ==
- Moma Airport, in Sakha Republic, Russia
- Moma Airport (Democratic Republic of the Congo), in Kasai-Occidental Province

== Other uses ==
- Moma (moth), an owlet moth genus
- Mars Organic Molecule Analyser, an instrument aboard the Rosalind Franklin Mars rover
- Mixed Groups of Reconstruction Machines, a Greek Army organization
- Modern Hungary Movement (Hungarian: Modern Magyarország Mozgalom), a political party in Hungary
- Moma language, spoken in Indonesia
- Museum of Modern Art (disambiguation)

== See also ==
- Mama (disambiguation)
- Momas, a commune of France
