= Kulun-Yelbyut =

Kulun-Yelbyut Кулун-Елбют
- Selo

Other transcription(s)
  - Yakut: Кулун Өлбүт
- Interactive map of Kulun-Yelbyut
- Location of Kulun-Yelbyut Kulun-Yelbyut (Sakha Republic)
- Coordinates: 66°47′N 142°44′E
- Country: Russia
- Federal subject: Sakha Republic
- Administrative district: Momsky District
- Rural okrugSelsoviet: Chybagalakhsky Rural Okrug
- Elevation: 155 m (509 ft)

Population (2010 Census)
  - Total: 243
  - Estimate (2021): 226 (−7%)

Administrative status
  - Capital of: Chybagalakhsky Rural Okrug

Municipal status
  - Municipal district: Momsky Municipal District
  - Rural settlement: Chybagalakhsky Rural Settlement
  - Capital of: Chybagalakhsky Rural Settlement
- Time zone: UTC+
- Postal code: 678862
- OKTMO ID: 98633405101

Kulun-Yelbyut (Russian: Кулун-Елбют; Yakut: Кулун Өлбүт, romanized: Kulun Ölbüt) is a rural locality (a selo), the only inhabited locality, and the administrative center of Chybagalakhsky Rural Okrug of Momsky District in the Sakha Republic, Russia, located 70 kilometers (43 mi) from Khonuu, the administrative center of the district. Its population as of the 2010 Census was 243, down from 300 recorded during the 2002 Census.

== See also ==
- Chybagylaakh
