= Rue du Pont-Neuf, Paris =

Street in Paris, France

Rue du Pont-Neuf
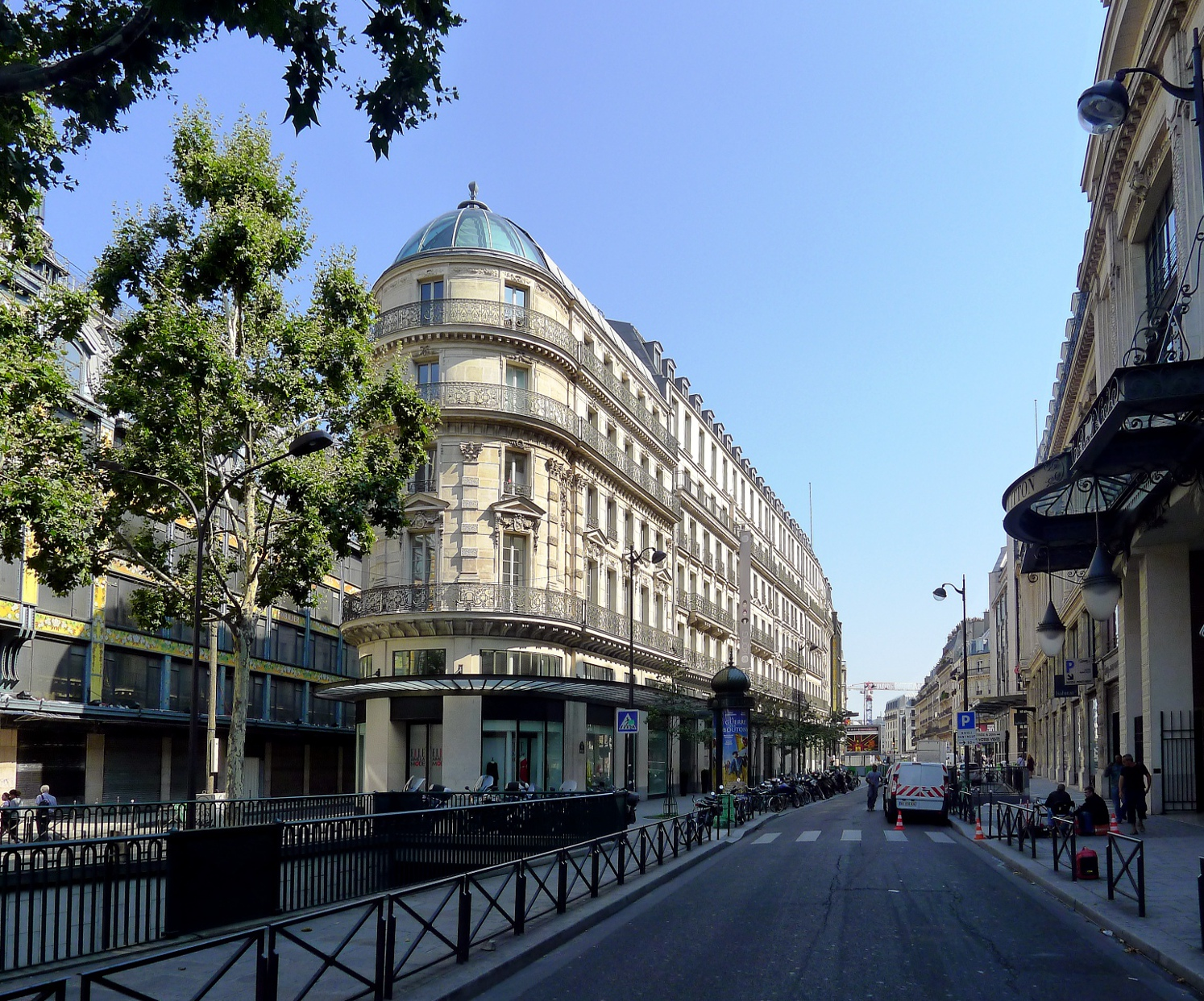

- Location within Paris
- Type: Street
- Length: 327 m (1,073 ft)
- Arrondissement: 1st arrondissement of Paris
- Quarter: Les Halles; Quartier Saint-Germain-l'Auxerrois

The Rue du Pont-Neuf is a street in the 1st arrondissement of Paris, France, shared between Les Halles to the north and Quartier Saint-Germain-l'Auxerrois to the south. It was pierced in the second half of the 19th century. It bears this name because it leads to the Pont Neuf.

== Location and access ==
The street gives access to the Pont Neuf from the right bank to the south, and to the Forum des Halles from its other end to the north.

The lane continues via this last end and becomes the Rue Baltard, closed to car traffic since the closure of the old halls of Paris, then the Rue Montorgueil, Rue des Petits-Carreaux, Rue Poissonnière, Rue du Faubourg-Poissonnière to end at the Barrière Poissonnière.

The current street is an important crossing point because it crosses several arteries such as the tracks of the banks of the Seine, the Rue de Rivoli and the Rue Saint-Honoré. There was previously an entrance to the Forum des Halles car park, now filled in and converted into a sidewalk.

== History ==
On 21 June 1854, a decree approved the plan for the restructuring of the Halles Centrales. This plan provided for the opening of a new street between the Pont Neuf and Les Halles. The plot plan of the properties to be expropriated for "the widening of the Rue Tirechape and the extension of this road to the Pont Neuf" was published on 6 September 1865.

The Rue Étienne, de la Tonnellerie and Tirechape were absorbed by the new road. Part of the Rue de la Monnaie and the Place des Trois-Maries, located at the mouth of the Pont Neuf, also disappeared. In 1867, the new road was named the Rue du Pont-Neuf. The part between the Rue Berger and the Rue Rambuteau was renamed the Rue Baltard in 1877; this street was removed during the construction of the Forum des Halles.

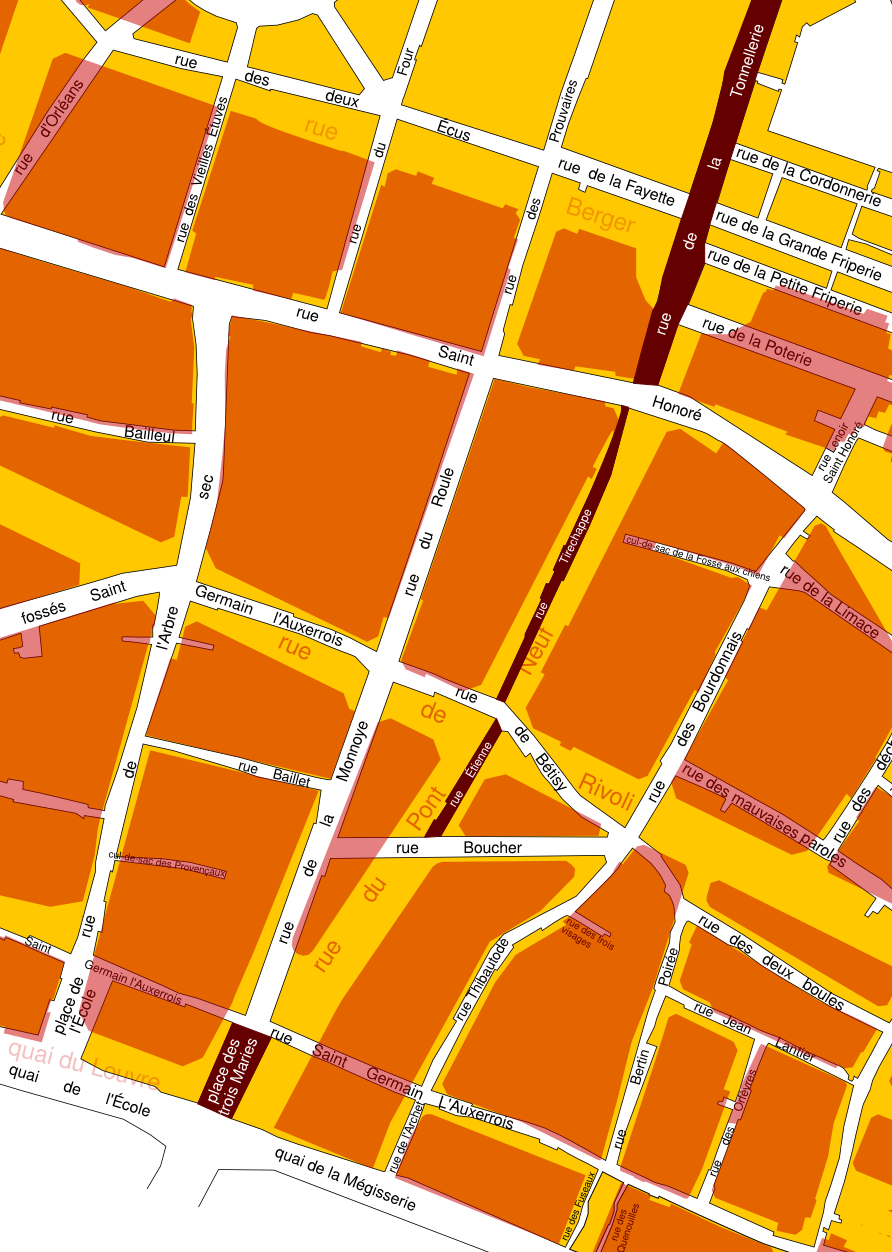
Superposition of the current road network on the neighboring road network at the end of the 18th century

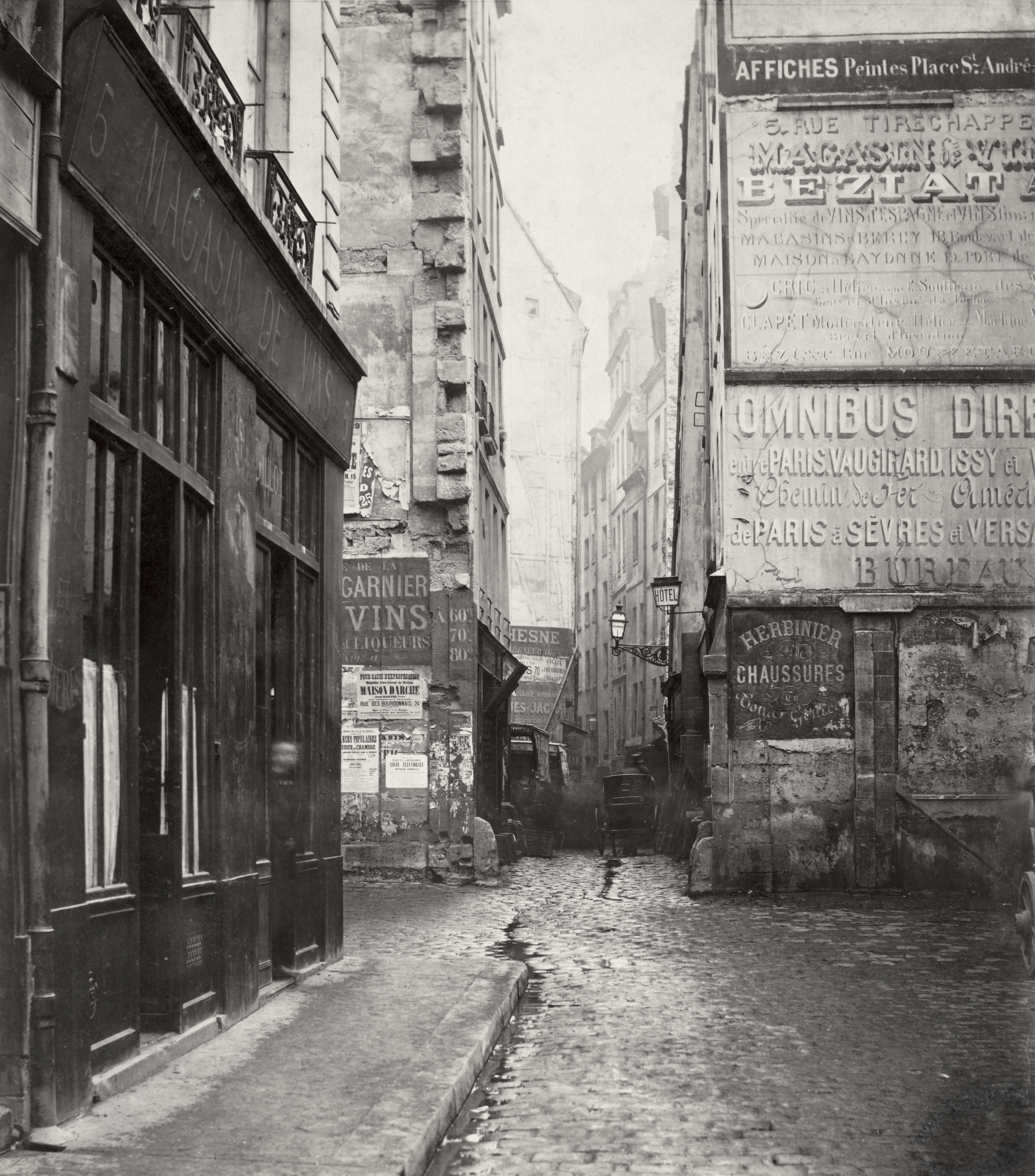
Rue Tirechape, from the Rue de Rivoli

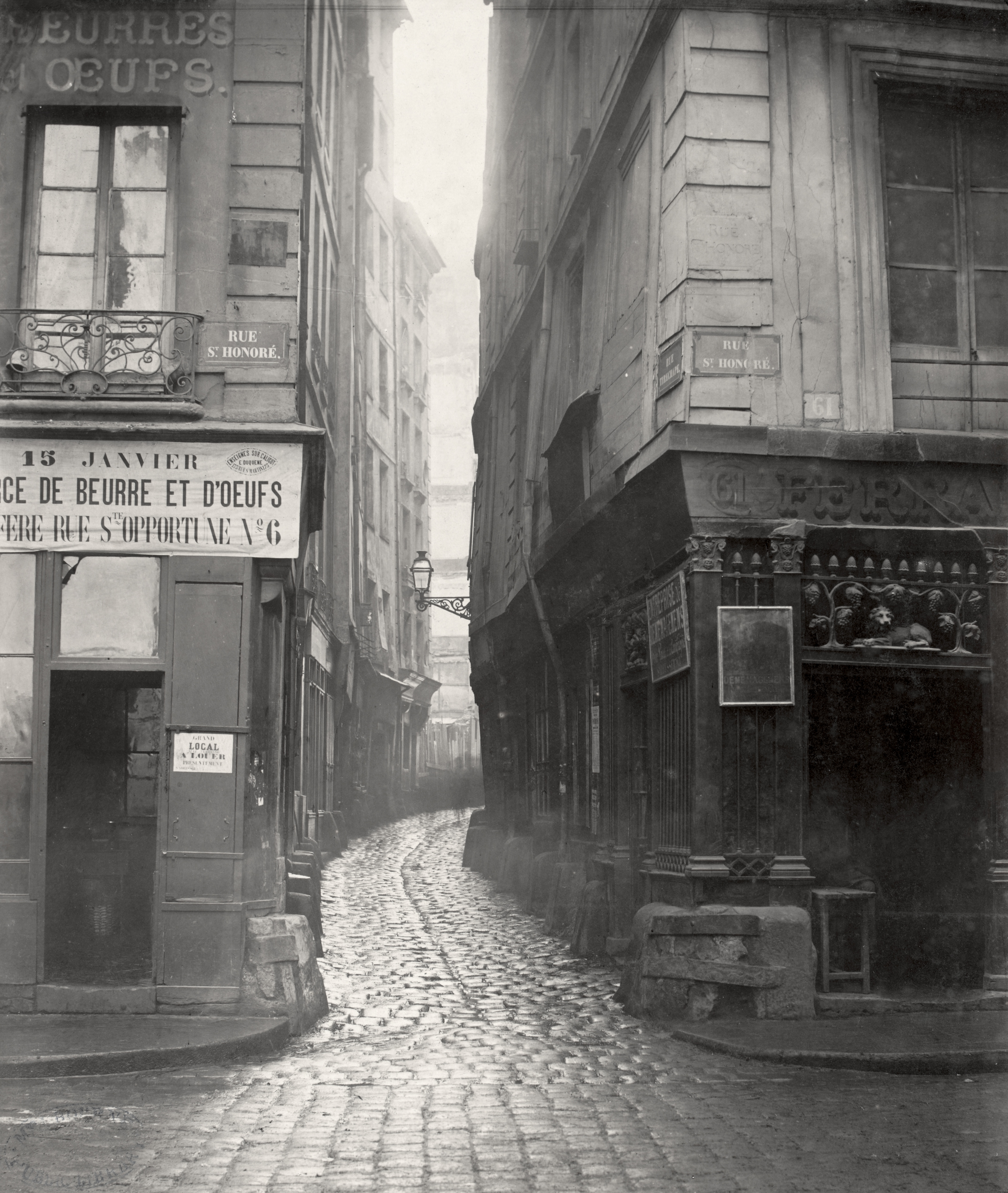
Rue Tirechape, from the Rue Saint-Honoré

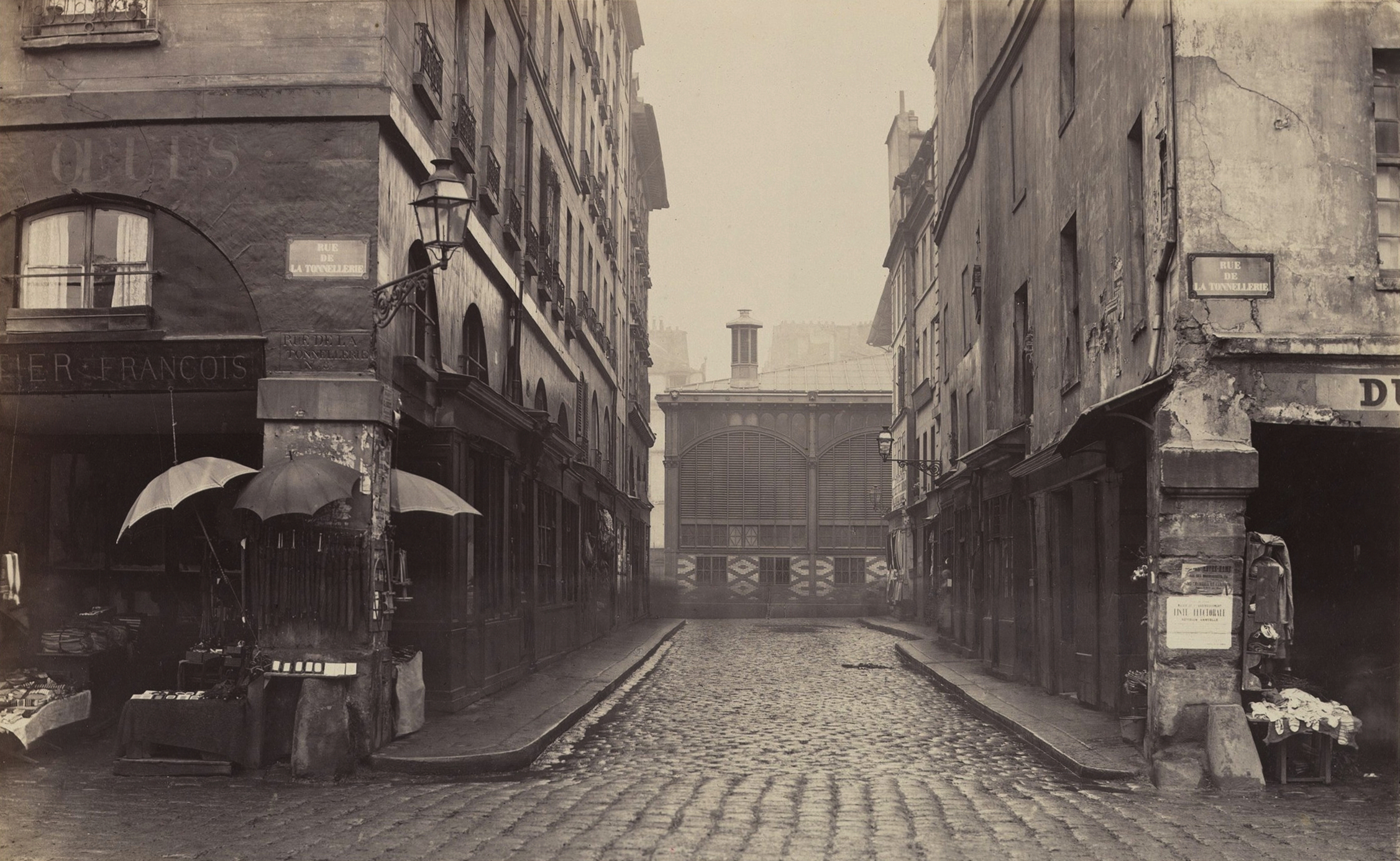
From the Rue du Contrat-Social to the Rue de la Tonnellerie

== Remarkable buildings and places of memory ==
- No. 1, at the corner with the Quai du Louvre: La Samaritaine department store, Monument historique. On the top floor, Le Kong, a restaurant fitted out in 2003 by designer Philippe Starck, whose glass roof is in line with the Pont Neuf. A scene from the film Tell No One (2006) was filmed there.
- No. 2, at the corner with the Quai de la Mégisserie: former site of the À la Belle Jardinière store (1867–1972).
- No. 31, Molière would have been born in a house which was on this site; a bust above an engraved inscription pays homage to him. Nearby, at 96 rue Saint-Honoré, is a commemorative plaque stating the same. We owe this inscription, indicating the birth of the man of letters in 1620, while he was born in 1622, to an unscrupulous owner who, by buying the building, thought that he could give it a capital gain by erecting this false plaque.
- No. 33, restaurant Au chien qui fume, Monument historique.
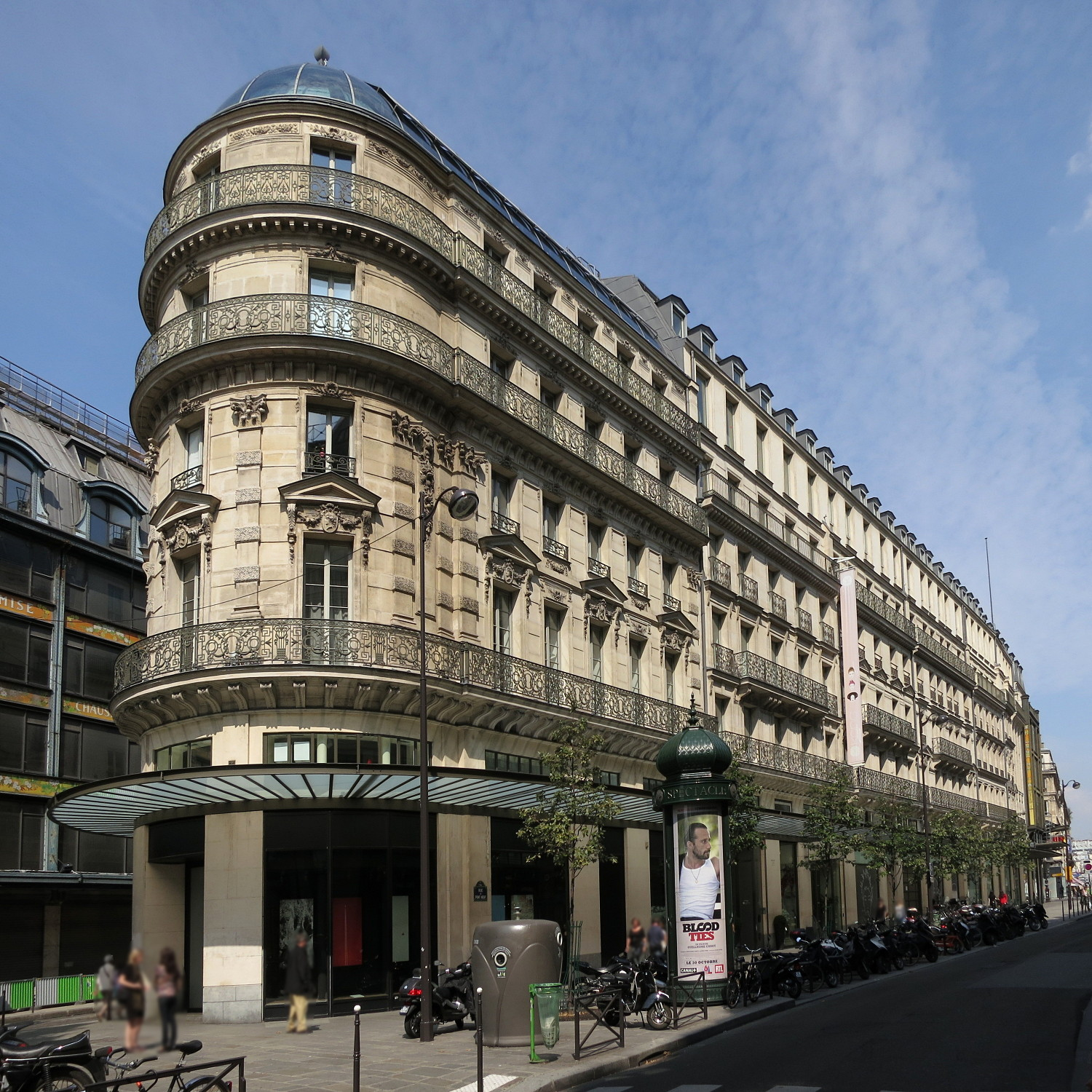
No. 1

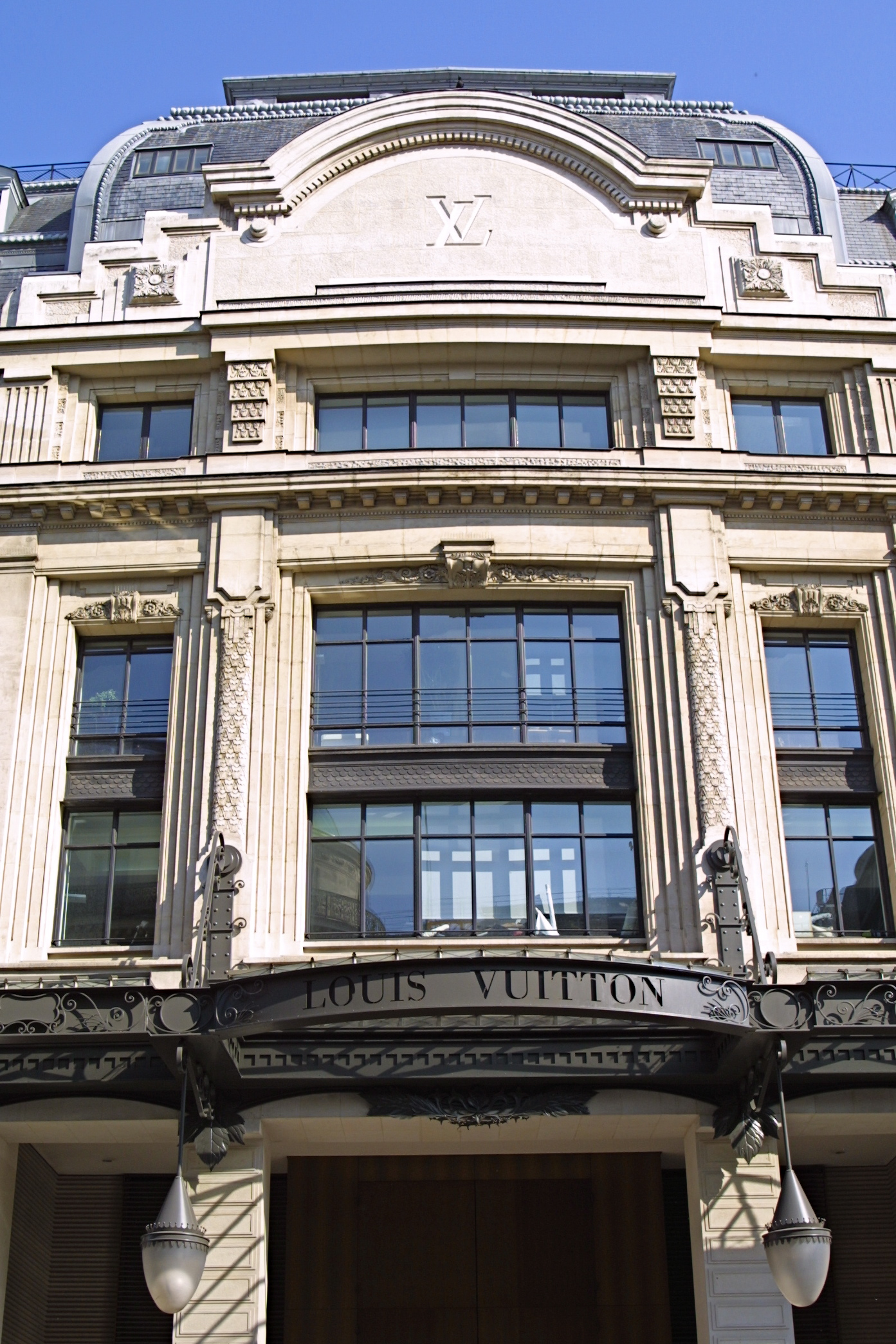
No. 2

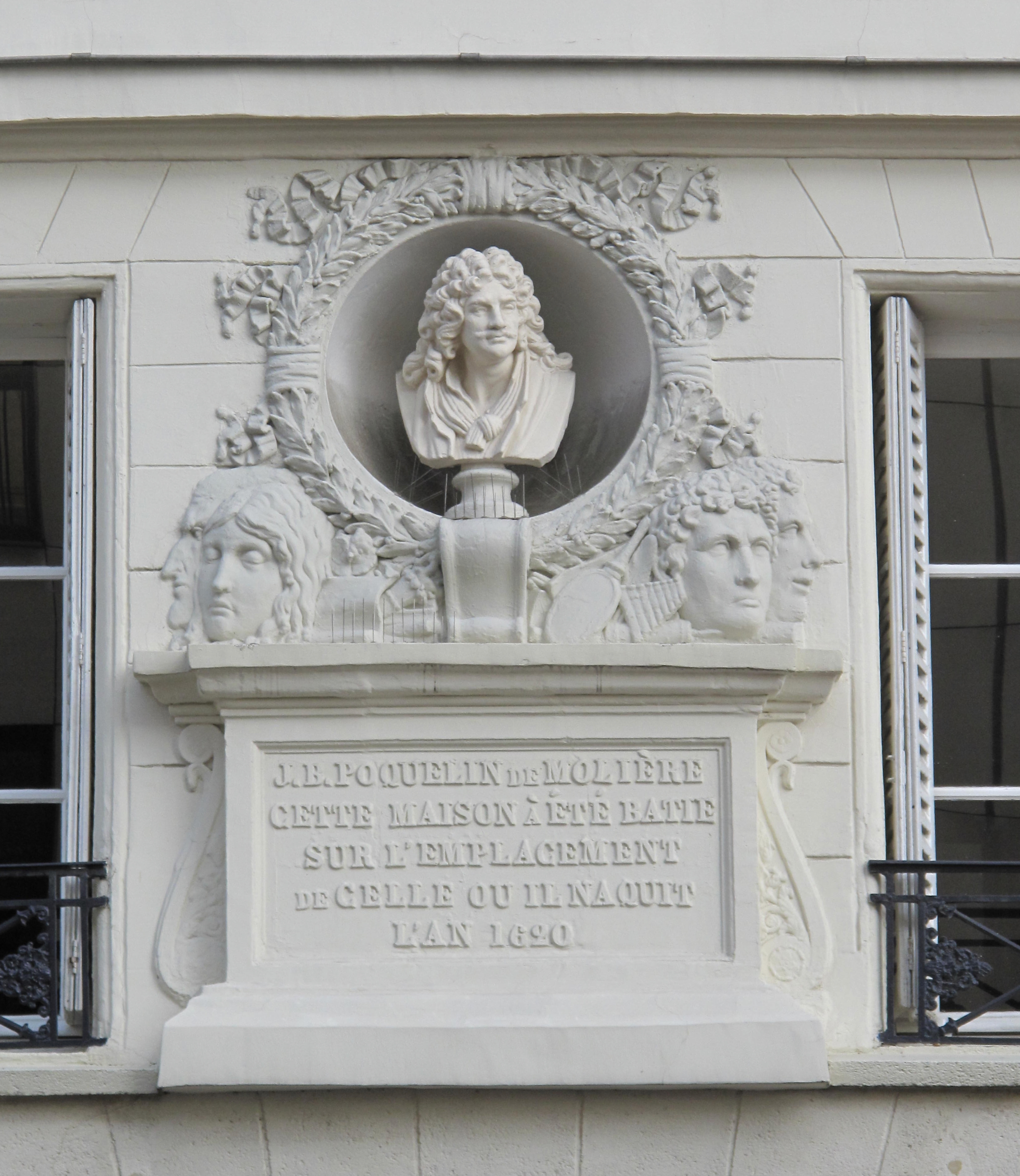
No. 31

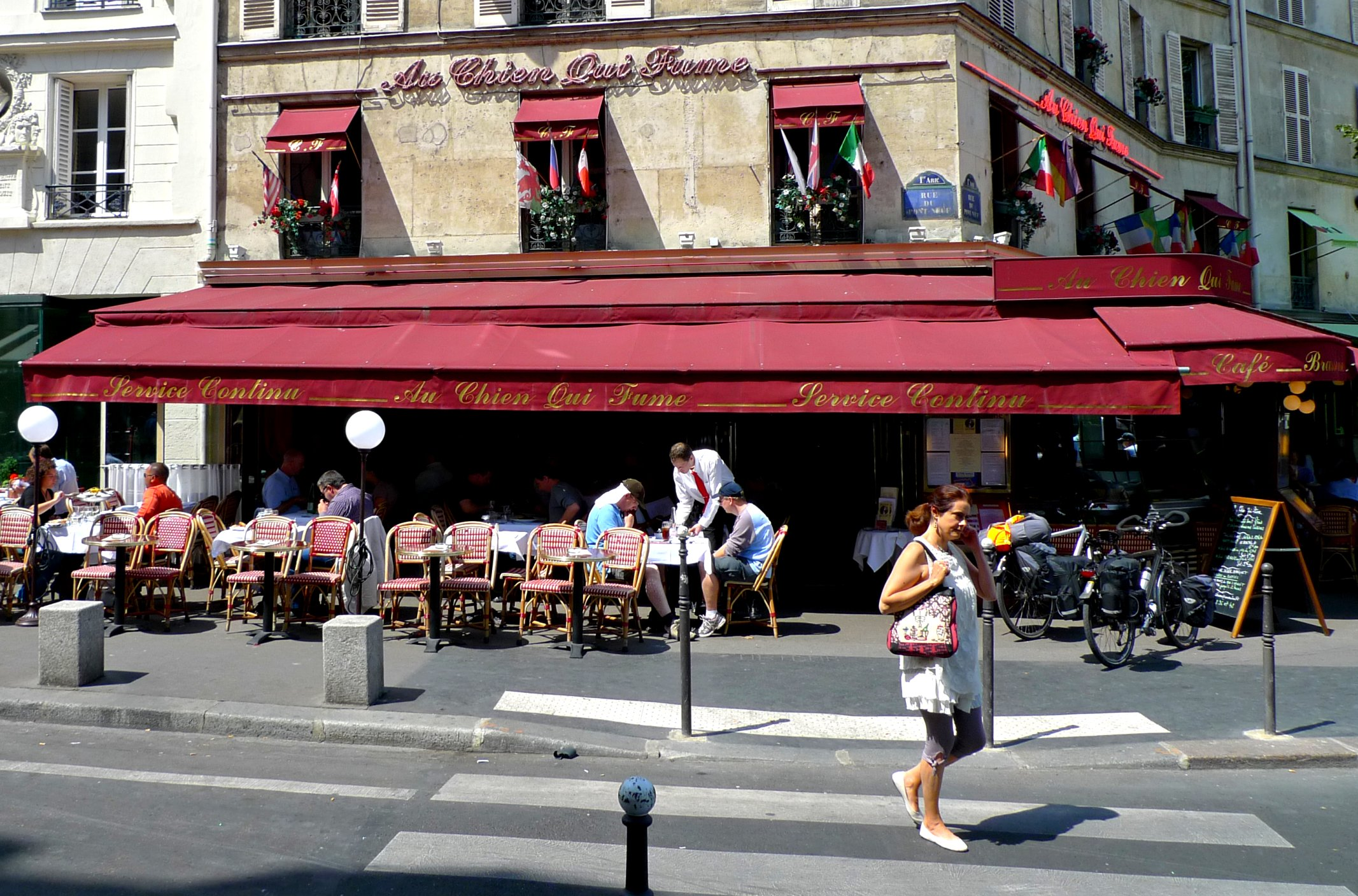
No. 33

== See also ==
- Haussmann's renovation of Paris
