= Sobolokh =

Sobolokh Соболох
- Selo

Other transcription(s)
  - Yakut: Соболоох
- Interactive map of Sobolokh
- Location of Sobolokh Sobolokh (Sakha Republic)
- Coordinates: 66°16′N 143°20′E
- Country: Russia
- Federal subject: Sakha Republic
- Administrative district: Momsky District
- Rural okrugSelsoviet: Sobolokhsky Rural Okrug

Population (2010 Census)
  - Total: 304
  - Estimate (2021): 252 (−17.1%)

Administrative status
  - Capital of: Sobolokhsky Rural Okrug

Municipal status
  - Municipal district: Momsky Municipal District
  - Rural settlement: Sobolokhsky Rural Settlement
  - Capital of: Sobolokhsky Rural Settlement
- Time zone: UTC+
- Postal code: 678864
- OKTMO ID: 98633428101

Sobolokh (Russian: Соболох; Yakut: Соболоох, romanized: Soboloox) is a rural locality (a selo), the only inhabited locality, and the administrative center of Sobolokhsky Rural Okrug of Momsky District in the Sakha Republic, Russia, located 30 kilometers (19 mi) from Khonuu, the administrative center of the district. Its population as of the 2010 Census was 304, down from 337 recorded during the 2002 Census.
