= Georges Renand =

Georges Renand (1879-1968) was a French department store manager and art collector

== Education and family life ==
Renand had a son, Maurice (1913-1990) and a daughter Jeannine (1918-2017)

== Career at La Samaritaine ==
Renand was an executive and director at La Samaritaine. His son Maurice also had a career there.

== Art Collection ==
Renand collected artworks by Edouard Vuillard, Camille Corot, Odilon Redon, Paulus Potter, Pierre Bonnard and Pablo Picasso, notably Pierrette's Wedding (Les Noces de Pierrette). Artworks from his collection are now in the National Gallery of Art, the MoMa, the Metropolitan Museum Art, the J. Paul Getty Museum as well as in a Japanese collection.

Renand's art collection was passed down to his daughter Jeannine (1918-2017) and her husband Edouard Chapet. Portions of it were auctioned at Drouot in the 1980s and Sotheby's in October 2018

== WWII ==
Renand was investigated by the Art Looting Investigation Unit for selling artworks to German buyers.
