= Chumpu-Kytyl =

Chumpu-Kytyl Чумпу-Кытыл
- Selo

Other transcription(s)
  - Yakut: Чуумпу Кытыл
- Interactive map of Chumpu-Kytyl
- Location of Chumpu-Kytyl Chumpu-Kytyl (Sakha Republic)
- Coordinates: 65°22′10″N 143°09′06″E
- Country: Russia
- Federal subject: Sakha Republic
- Administrative district: Momsky District
- Rural okrugSelsoviet: Tebyulekhsky Rural Okrug

Population (2010 Census)
  - Total: 198
  - Estimate (2021): 214 (+8.1%)

Administrative status
  - Capital of: Tebyulekhsky Rural Okrug

Municipal status
  - Municipal district: Momsky Municipal District
  - Rural settlement: Tebyulekhsky Rural Settlement
  - Capital of: Tebyulekhsky Rural Settlement
- Time zone: UTC+
- Postal code: 678865
- OKTMO ID: 98633430101

Chumpu-Kytyl (Russian: Чумпу-Кытыл; Yakut: Чуумпу Кытыл, romanized: Čuumpu Kıtıl) is a rural locality (a selo), the only inhabited locality, and the administrative center of Tebyulekhsky Rural Okrug of Momsky District in the Sakha Republic, Russia, located 180 kilometers (110 mi) from Khonuu, the administrative center of the district. Its population as of the 2010 Census was 198, up from 179 recorded during the 2002 Census.
