= Momsky District =

Momsky District Момский улус (Russian)
- District

Other transcription(s)
  - Yakut: Муома улууhа
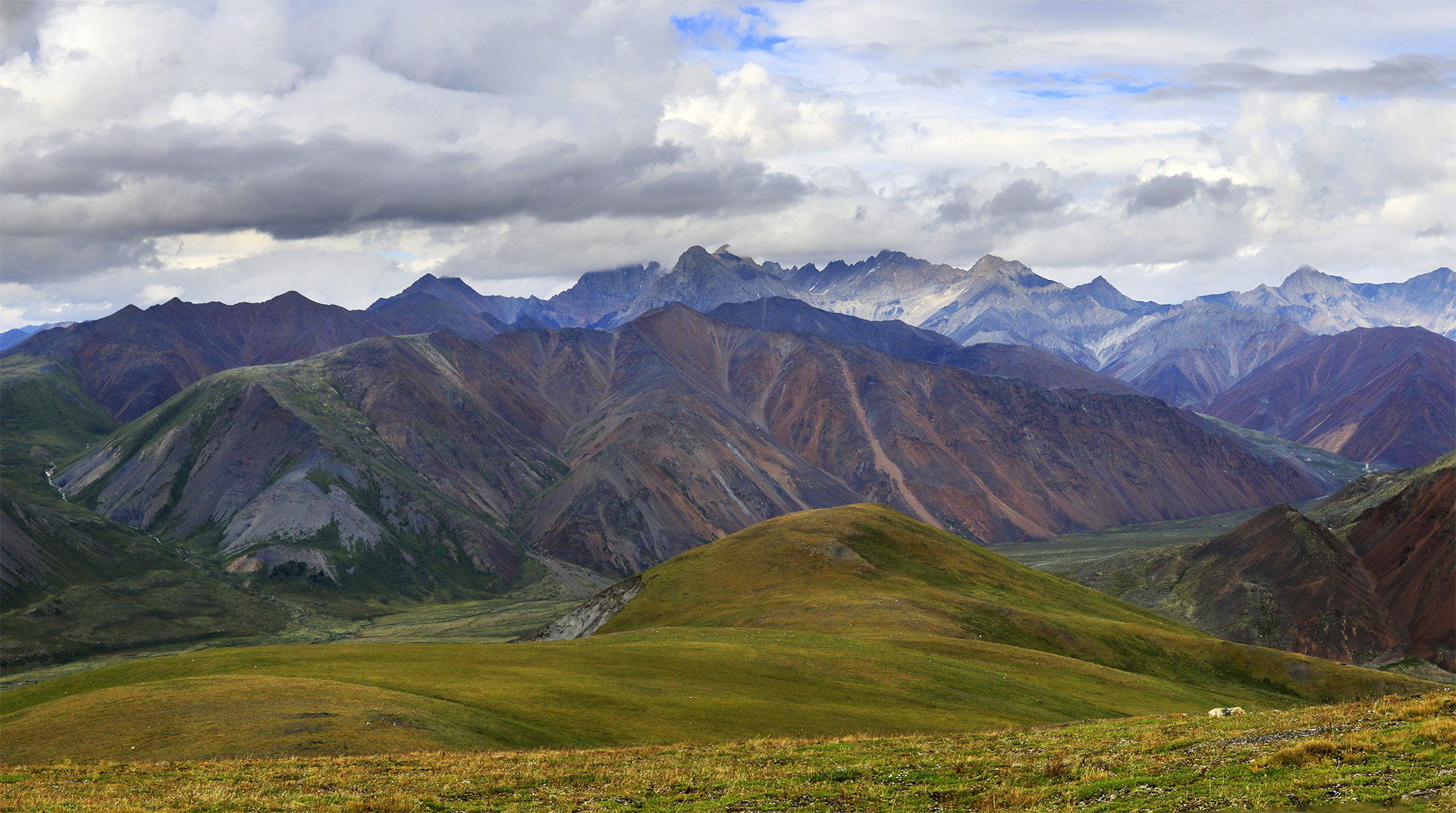
- Buordakh Mountain, Ulakhan-Chistay Range, Momsky District

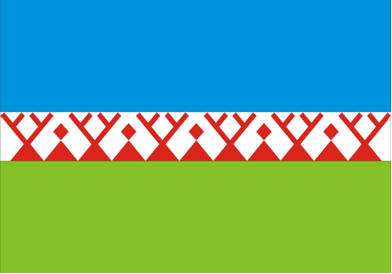
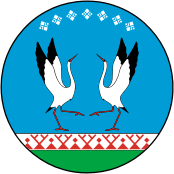
- Flag Coat of arms
- Location of Momsky District in the Sakha Republic
- Coordinates: 66°27′N 143°13′E
- Country: Russia
- Federal subject: Sakha Republic
- Established: May 20, 1931
- Administrative center: Khonuu

Area
  - Total: 104,600 km^{2} (40,400 sq mi)

Population (2010 Census)
  - Total: 4,452
  - Density: 0.04256/km^{2} (0.1102/sq mi)
  - Urban: 0%
  - Rural: 100%

Administrative structure
  - Administrative divisions: 6 Rural okrugs
  - Inhabited localities: 7 rural localities

Municipal structure
  - Municipally incorporated as: Momsky Municipal District
  - Municipal divisions: 0 urban settlements, 6 rural settlements
- Time zone: UTC+
- OKTMO ID: 98633000

Population of Momsky District
- 2010 Census: 4,452
- 2002 Census: 4,699
- 1989 Census: 5,505
- 1979 Census: 4,202

Momsky District (Russian: Момский улу́с; Yakut: Муома улууһа, Muoma uluuha, [muoma uluːha]) is an administrative and municipal district (raion, or ulus), one of the thirty-four in the Sakha Republic, Russia. It is located in the northeast of the republic. The area of the district is 104,600 square kilometers (40,400 sq mi). Its administrative center is the rural locality (a selo) of Khonuu. As of the 2010 Census, the total population of the district was 4,452, with the population of Khonuu accounting for 55.6% of that number.

== Geography ==
The landscape of the district is mostly mountainous. The highest point of the Chersky Range, (3,003 meters (9,852 ft)) high Mount Pobeda, is located in the district. The main river in the district is the Indigirka with its tributaries the Moma and the Chibagalakh.

=== Climate ===
Average January temperature ranges from −36 to −44 °C (−33 to −47 °F) and average July temperature ranges from +6 to +14 °C (43 to 57 °F). Average precipitation ranges from 150–200 millimeters (5.9–7.9 in) in the intermountain basin to 500–600 millimeters (20–24 in) in the mountains.

== History ==
The district was established on May 20, 1931. Prior to that, its territory was a part of Verkhoyansky District.

The Moma Natural Park, located in the Moma River valley and the Ulakhan-Chistay Range of the southern part of the district, is a major tourist attraction that was established on 18 June 1996.

== Administrative and municipal status ==
Within the framework of administrative divisions, Momsky District is one of the thirty-four in the republic. The district is divided into six rural okrugs (naslegs) which comprise seven rural localities. As a municipal division, the district is incorporated as Momsky Municipal District. Its six rural okrugs are incorporated into six rural settlements within the municipal district. The selo of Khonuu serves as the administrative center of both the administrative and municipal district.

=== Inhabited localities ===
Administrative/municipal composition
Rural okrugs/Rural settlements	Population	Rural localities in jurisdiction*
Indigirsky (Индигирский)	387	**selo of Buor-Sysy**
Momsky (Момский)	2,607	**selo of Khonuu** (administrative center of the district); selo of Suon-Tit
Sobolokhsky (Соболохский)	304	**selo of Sobolokh**
Tebyulekhsky (Тебюлехский)	198	**selo of Chumpu-Kytyl**
Ulakhan-Chistaysky (Улахан-Чистайский)	713	**selo of Sasyr**
Chybagalakhsky (Чыбагалахский)	243	**selo of Kulun-Yelbyut**

*Administrative centers are shown in bold

== Economy ==
The economy of the district is mostly based on agriculture, including breeding of horses and cattle, fur farming, and reindeer herding.

== Demographics ==
As of the 2021 Census, the ethnic composition was as follows:

- Yakuts: 62.3%
- Evens: 30.5%
- Russians: 4.9%
- Yukaghir people: 0.5%
- others ethnicities: 1.8%
