= Les Noces de Pierrette =

1905 painting by Pablo Picasso

- Artist: Pablo Picasso
- Year: 1905
- Medium: Oil on canvas
- Dimensions: 115 cm × 195 cm (45 in × 77 in)
- Owner: SBI Shinsei Bank

Les Noces de Pierrette (English: The Marriage of Pierrette) is a 1905 painting by the Spanish artist Pablo Picasso. While belonging chronologically to Picasso's Rose Period, it is artistically characteristic of the Blue Period, when the artist faced poverty and depression following the suicide of his friend Carlos Casagemas in 1901. In 1989, it was sold for $51,670,000, making it one of the world's most expensive paintings at the time although its history was considered "enigmatic".

== Sales history ==
The painting was acquired in 1907 by Josef Stránský, an art dealer and a friend of Picasso's. From 1945 to 1962, the painting was owned by Picasso's son Paulo Picasso.

Previous owners include the art dealer Hugo Perls and Georges Renand, owner of La Samaritaine department store, purchased the work. The painting was owned by the Swedish investment banker and merchant Fredrik Roos when it was sold at Binoche et Godeau in Paris on November 30, 1989. The buyer, Tomonori Tsurumaki, a real-estate developer, investment banker and owner of Autopolis racetrack, purchased the painting for the sum of $51,670,000, making it one of the world's most expensive paintings.

With the collapse of Tsurumaki's company, Nippon Tri-Trust, the painting ended up in the hands of the construction company Hazama, which had constructed Tsurumaki's racetrack. Hazama, having run into financial difficulties, put the painting up as collateral when the firm took a loan from Lake Credit Company. Thus, Lake Credit Company came into possession of Les Noces de Pierrette. When Lake Credit Company sold its stake in the mainline consumer loan business to GE Capital, Les Noces de Pierrette (along with 500 other paintings worth approximately $200 million) became the property of GE Capital. Presently, Les Noces de Pierrette is secured in the vault of Sumitomo Mitsui Trust Holdings (formerly the Mitsui Trust Bank). It was offered at $54 million in 1994 with no takers, and again, also with no takers in 1997 at $35 million. The Japanese operation of GE Capital was subsequently sold to Shinsei Bank in 2008, along with its art collection portfolio.

== See also ==
- Picasso's Blue Period
- Picasso's Rose Period
- List of most expensive paintings
