= Paul Chaleff =

American ceramic artist and professor (b. 1947)

- Born: 1947 (age 78–79); Bronx, New York
- Education: City College of New York
- Known for: Large-scale ceramic sculptures
- Style: Anagama
- Spouse: Haesook Kim
- Patrons: MoMa,The Met
- Website: https://www.paulchaleff.com/

Paul Chaleff (born 1947) is an American ceramist and professor emeritus of Fine Arts at Hofstra University. He is considered a pioneer of the revival of wood-fired ceramics in the US and credited as one of the first to use wood-burning dragon kilns in the style of the anagama tradition. He is best known as an innovator of large-scale ceramic sculpture. His work can be found in the collections of the Museum of Modern Art Department of Architecture and Design, and in the Metropolitan Museum of Art.

Paul Chaleff's work was strongly influenced by master potter Takeshi Nakazato. In 1989, Chaleff began collaborating with sculptor Sir Anthony Caro. Together they created nearly 50 works, both figurative and abstract. Caro's sculpture has had a direct influence on Chaleff's work as has the sculpture of Isamu Noguchi, and the ceramics of John Mason and Lucie Rie. Chaleff has also been recognized as an innovator of large-scale ceramic sculpture. The strength of his works stems from their being rough, gestural, split, and impure while remaining elegant.

== Education ==
Chaleff attended the Bronx High School of Science. In 1968, while studying biology at the City College of New York, Chaleff survived a drowning accident that took his friend's life. He graduated in 1969 with a degree in Fine Arts. In 1971, Chaleff received his Master of Fine Arts in Ceramic Design from City College of New York. In 1975 he traveled to Japan to study Japanese pottery and wood-burning kiln design and returned to New York in 1977 where he built a studio and kilns in Pine Plains.

== Career ==
Chaleff's anagama kiln was one of the first in the US. In 1980, the Museum of Modern Art purchased and exhibited his work from that kiln. In 1980, his wood-fired work was showcased at an official State dinner at the White House. Between 1989 and 2000, Chaleff collaborated on a series of clay sculptures with Sir Anthony Caro in his studio, first in Pine Plains and then Ancram. In 1995, he participated in Fire and Clay, a symposium of international clay sculptors held in Iksan. In 1997, Chaleff accepted a professorship from Hofstra University, where he directed the ceramics program until retirement in 2021.

== Museum collections ==
Chaleff's work is represented in the following museum collections.

- Museum of Modern Art, Department of Architecture and Design, New York
- Metropolitan Museum of Art, New York
- Los Angeles County Museum of Art
- Boston Museum of Fine Arts
- National Museum of American Art (Washington, DC)
- Carnegie Museum of Art (Pennsylvania)
- Yale University Art Gallery
- Philadelphia Museum of Art (Pennsylvania)
- Princeton University Art Museum (New Jersey)
- Amore-Pacific Museum of Art (Korea)
- Brooklyn Museum
- Museum of Arts and Design (New York City)
- Everson Museum
- Grounds For Sculpture (New Jersey)
- Longhouse Foundation (East Hampton, New York)
- Boise Art Museum
- Racine Art Museum
- Arkansas Art Center
- Rockefeller University
- Allentown Museum of Art (Pennsylvania)
- University of Colorado Art Museum (Bolder)
- University of Iowa Museum of Art (Iowa City)
- Crocker Art Museum (California)
- American Museum of Ceramic Art (California)
- Arizona State University Museum of Art (Tempe)
- Mills College (California)
- Thayer Academy (Massachusetts)
- Muju Sculpture Park (Korea)
- Idyllwild School of Music and the Arts (California)
- City College of New York (New York City)
- Studio Potter Collection (New Hampshire)
- Arrowmount School of Arts and Crafts
