= Sasyr =

Sasyr Сасыр Сааһыр (Sakha)
- Selo
- Interactive map of Sasyr
- Location of Sasyr Sasyr (Sakha Republic)
- Coordinates: 65°09′59″N 147°04′36″E
- Country: Russia
- Federal subject: Sakha Republic
- Administrative district: Momsky District
- Rural okrugSelsoviet: Ulakhan-Chistaysky National Rural Okrug
- Founded: 1932
- Elevation: 585 m (1,919 ft)

Population (2010 Census)
  - Total: 713
  - Estimate (2021): 687 (−3.6%)

Administrative status
  - Capital of: Ulakhan-Chistaysky National Rural Okrug

Municipal status
  - Municipal district: Momsky Municipal District
  - Rural settlement: Ulakhan-Chistaysky National Rural Settlement
  - Capital of: Ulakhan-Chistaysky National Rural Settlement
- Time zone: UTC+
- Postal code: 678863
- OKTMO ID: 98633435101

Sasyr (Russian: Сасыр; Yakut: Сааһыр, Saahır) is a rural locality (a selo), the only inhabited locality, and the administrative center of Ulakhan-Chistaysky National Rural Okrug of Momsky District in the Sakha Republic, Russia, located 400 kilometers (250 mi) from Khonuu, the administrative center of the district. Its population as of the 2010 Census was 713, of whom 364 were male and 349 female, down from 772 recorded during the 2002 Census.

It is the nearest village to Moma Natural Park.
