= Buor-Sysy =

Buor-Sysy Буор-Сысы Буор Сыһыы (Sakha)
- Selo
- Interactive map of Buor-Sysy
- Location of Buor-Sysy Buor-Sysy (Sakha Republic)
- Coordinates: 66°29′06″N 143°03′08″E
- Country: Russia
- Federal subject: Sakha Republic
- Administrative district: Momsky District
- Rural okrugSelsoviet: Indigirsky National Rural Okrug
- Elevation: 190 m (620 ft)

Population (2010 Census)
  - Total: 387
  - Estimate (2021): 352 (−9%)

Administrative status
  - Capital of: Indigirsky National Rural Okrug

Municipal status
  - Municipal district: Momsky Municipal District
  - Rural settlement: Indigirsky National Rural Settlement
  - Capital of: Indigirsky National Rural Settlement
- Time zone: UTC+
- Postal code: 678871
- OKTMO ID: 98633414101

Buor-Sysy (Russian: Буор-Сысы; Yakut: Буор Сыһыы, Buor Sıhıı) is a rural locality (a selo), the only inhabited locality, and the administrative center of Indigirsky National Rural Okrug of Momsky District in the Sakha Republic, Russia, located 10 kilometers (6.2 mi) from Khonuu, the administrative center of the district. Its population as of the 2010 Census was 387, of whom 198 were male and 189 female, down from 463 recorded during the 2002 Census.
