= Suon-Tit =

Suon-Tit Суон-Тит Суон Тиит (Sakha)
- Selo
- Interactive map of Suon-Tit
- Location of Suon-Tit Suon-Tit (Sakha Republic)
- Coordinates: 66°25′N 143°16′E
- Country: Russia
- Federal subject: Sakha Republic
- Administrative district: Momsky District
- Rural okrugSelsoviet: Momsky Rural Okrug

Population (2010 Census)
  - Total: 131
  - Estimate (2021): 90 (−31.3%)

Municipal status
  - Municipal district: Momsky Municipal District
  - Rural settlement: Momsky Rural Settlement
- Time zone: UTC+
- Postal code: 678860
- OKTMO ID: 98633423106

Suon-Tit (Russian: Суон-Тит; Yakut: Суон Тиит, Suon Tiit) is a rural locality (a selo) in Momsky Rural Okrug of Momsky District in the Sakha Republic, Russia, located 3 kilometers (1.9 mi) from Khonuu, the administrative center of both the district and the rural okrug. Its population as of the 2010 Census was 131, down from 154 recorded during the 2002 Census.
