= Tamara Lunger =

Italian mountaineer (born 1986)

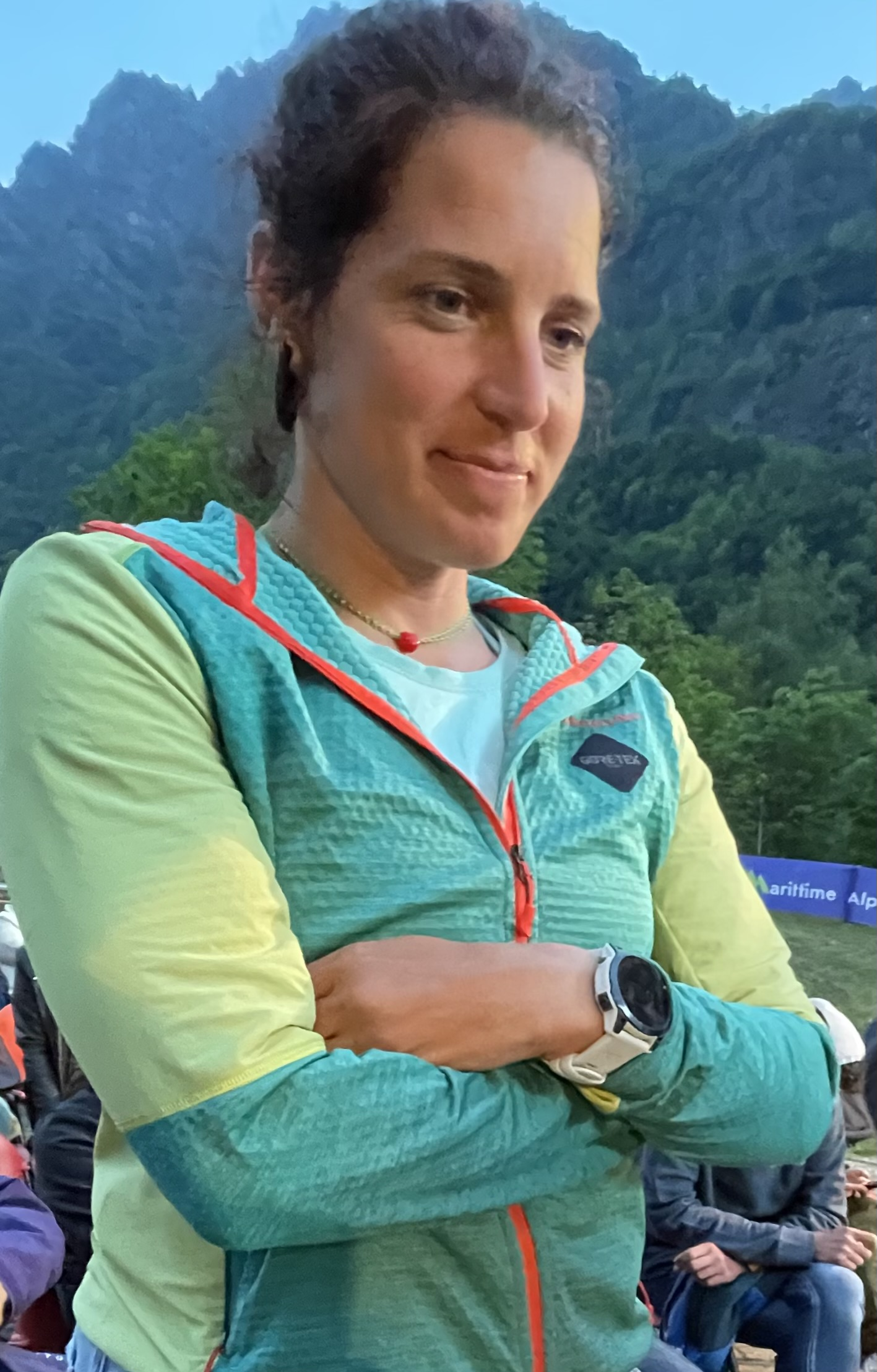

Personal information
- Born: 6 June 1986 (age 40) Bolzano, Italy

Climbing career
- Major ascents: Lhotse, 2010 (aged 23, youngest woman to summit); K2, 2014 (without supplemental oxygen)

Tamara Lunger (born 6 June 1986) is an Italian mountaineer, who started her career as a ski mountaineer.

== Early life ==
Lunger was born in Bolzano; she is the daughter of the ski mountaineer Hansjörg Lunger. She started ski mountaineering in 2002 and competed first in a vertical race event in San Martino.

== Mountaineering ==
On 23 May 2010, Lunger became the youngest female climber (aged 23 years, 11 months, and 17 days), to have reached the main summit of Lhotse. In February 2015 Tamara tried to climb Manaslu together with Simone Moro, but abandoned the climb due to heavy snow. During the 2015-2016 winter season, in her attempt with Simone Moro for the first winter ascent of Nanga Parbat, she gave up just 70 meters below the top. In February 2018, with Simone Moro, she made the first winter ascent of Pik Pobeda (Chersky Mountains, 3.003m). This summit is located in Siberia, in a very remote region. It is known to be one of the coldest places on Earth.

In December 2019, Lunger and Simone Moro attempted the first winter ascent of Gasherbrum I and Gasherbrum II in Karakoram. The expedition was called off after Moro was injured in a fall after having crossed the icefall.

== Ski mountaineering results ==
- 2007:
  - 1st, Pierra Menta "espoirs" class race (together with Silvia Cuminetti)
  - 5th, European Championship team race (together with Elisa Fleischmann)
  - 2nd, Scialpinistica del Monte Canin (together with Stefania Zanon)
  - 5th, European Cup
  - 5th, Trofeo Mezzalama (with Silvia Cuminetti and Fabienne Chanoine)
- 2008:
  - 1st, Pierra Menta "espoirs" class race (together with Elisa Fleischmann)
  - 3rd, Sellaronda Skimarathon (together with Elisa Fleischmann)
  - 9th, World Championship team race (with Silvia Cuminetti)
- 2009:
  - 5th, European Championship team race (with Corinne Clos)
