= Moma Natural Park =

Natural park in Russia

- IUCN category II (national park)
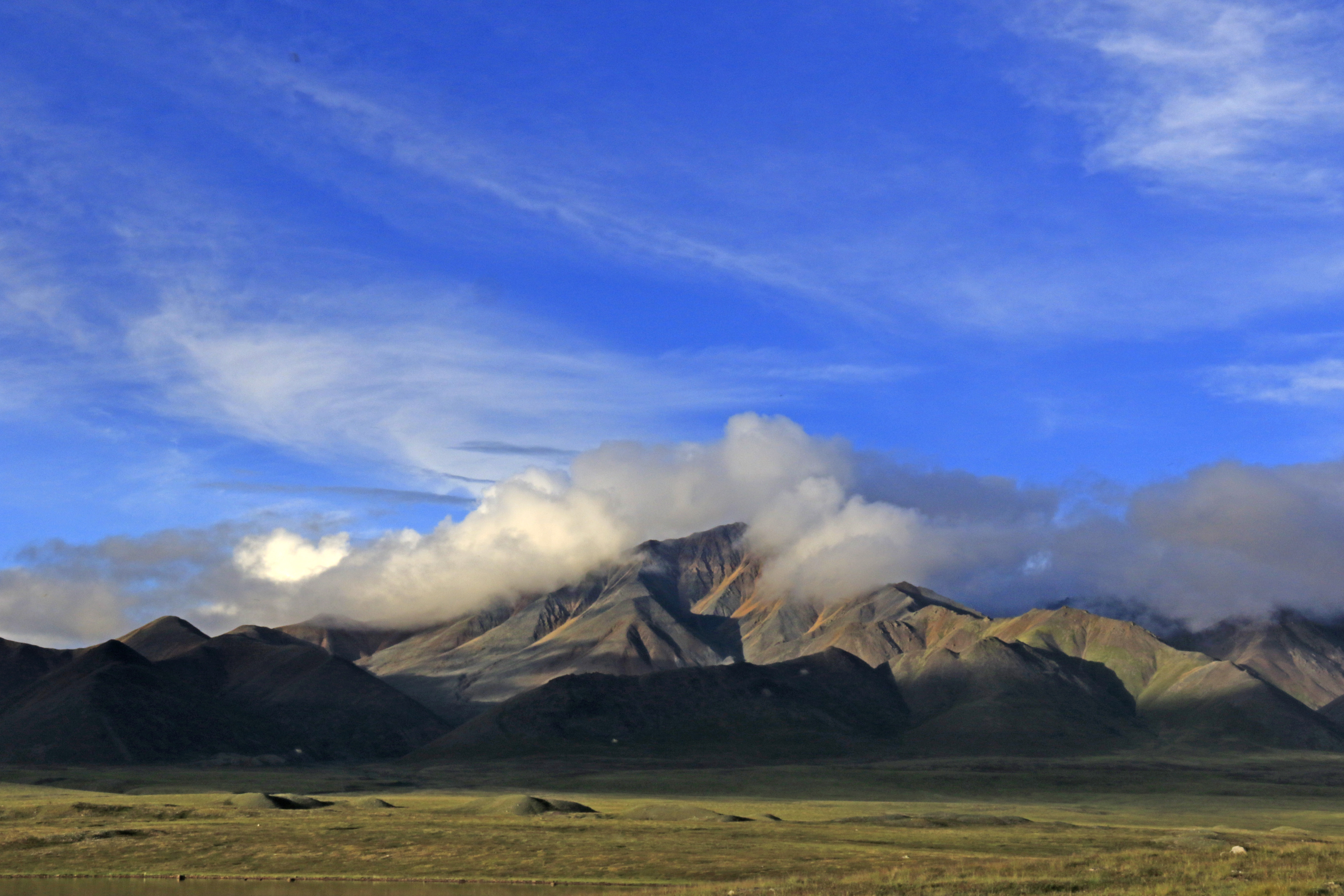
- View of the Buordakh Massif

- Location within Sakha Republic
- Location: Sakha Republic, Russia
- Nearest city: Khonuu, Moma District, Russia
- Coordinates: 65°10′N 147°4′E
- Area: 2,175,600 hectares (5,376,000 acres)
- Established: 18 June 1996
- Governing body: Ministry of Nature Protection of the Sakha Republic (Yakutia)

Moma Natural Park or Moma Nature Park (Russian: Момский природный парк, Momsky Pryrodny Park; Yakut: Аан Айылгы, Aan Aiylgy) is a protected area of the Momsko-Chersk Region of Yakutia in the upper part of the Moma River basin.

Administratively the park is a part of the Moma District, Sakha Republic, Far Eastern Russia. The nearest city is Khonuu, served by Moma Airport, and the nearest village Sasyr.

== Attractions ==
The park includes part of the mostly mountainous area of the Ulakhan-Chistay Range, featuring pristine ridges and lakes of environmental and aesthetic value. Visitors may find a whole array of educational and recreational purposes in the area. Some of the main features are:

- Mount Pobeda (3,147 metres (10,325 ft)), rising in the Buordakh Massif, is the highest point of the Ulakhan-Chistay, as well as of the Chersky mountain system. Climbing routes of varying difficulty are marked —up to category 5A.
- Moma River valley, featuring the extinct cinder cone volcanoes Balagan-Tas and Uraga-Tas.
- Ulakhan-Taryn (Bolshaya Momskaya Aufeis), a layered ice body formed by frozen river flows. By the end of winter, its dimensions can be 30 km long and 5 km wide with a thickness of 7 meters.

== See also ==
- Moma Range, located further north
- East Siberian Mountains
