= Badyarikha =

River in Yakutia, Russia

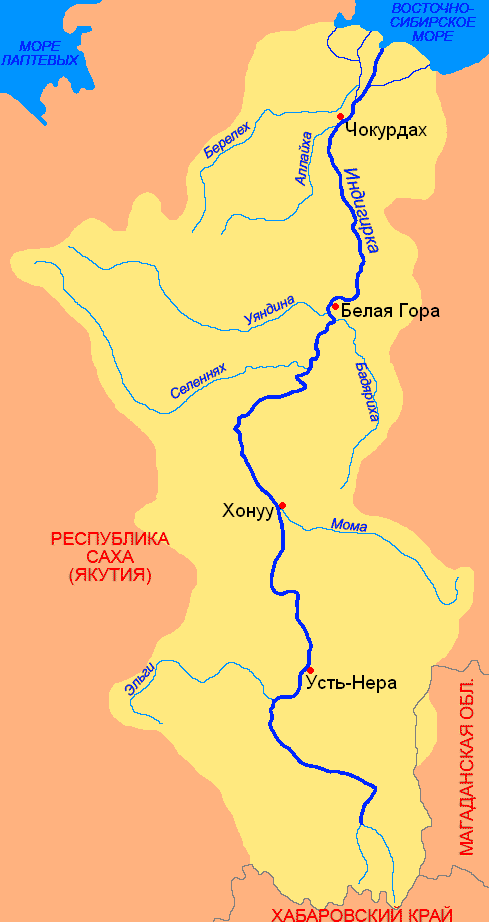
- Indigirka Basin

Location
- Country: Russia

Physical characteristics
- Source
  - location: Moma Range
- Mouth: Indigirka
  - coordinates: 68°20′39″N 146°01′02″E
- Length: 545 km (339 mi)
- Basin size: 12,200 km^{2} (4,700 sq mi)

Basin features
- Progression: Indigirka→ East Siberian Sea

The Badyarikha (Russian: Бадяриха; Yakut: Бадьаариха, Bacaariixa) is a river in Yakutia in Russia, a right tributary of the Indigirka. The length of the Badyarikha is 545 kilometres (339 mi) and the area of its drainage basin is 12,200 square kilometres (4,700 mi^{2}). Its sources are located on the northern slopes of the Moma Range

The Badyarikha flows on the eastern side of the Aby Lowland. Its main tributaries are the rivers Ogorokha, Orto-Tirekhtyakh, and Anty.

== Paleontology ==
A diverse mammoth fauna, including a mummy of Homotherium latidens cub, one of the few Eurasian records of this species from the Upper Pleistocene, was found in the Yedoma horizon at the Badyarikhskoe locality on this river.
