= Balagan-Tas =

Cinder cone volcano in Russia

- Балаган-Тас
- Location within Far Eastern Federal District

Highest point
- Elevation: 993 m (3,258 ft)
- Prominence: 300 m (980 ft)

Naming
- Native name: Балаҕан Таас (Yakut); Balaghan Taas (Yakut)

Geography
- Location: Sakha Republic, Russia
- Parent range: Chersky Range

Geology
- Rock age: 266,000 ± 30,000 years
- Mountain type: Cinder Cone
- Last eruption: 1775

Balagan-Tas (Yakut: Балаҕан Таас, Russian: Балаган-Тас) is a cinder cone volcano in Russia. It was discovered by V.A. Zimin in 1939 and is one of the main features of Moma Natural Park.

== Description ==
This volcano is located in the Chersky Range, in the Moma River valley, and is the only clearly Quaternary volcano in the area; the existence of another volcano active in the 1770s has not been confirmed. The supposed Indigirsky volcano (reported near the Indigirka river) may be actually Balagan-Tas. Its location has often been given incorrectly.

Balagan-Tas is a volcanic cone with a crater of which little remains. It covers a surface area of 1.8 square kilometres (0.69 sq mi). The crater is 200 metres (660 ft) wide and 40 metres (130 ft) deep; the cone is 300 metres (980 ft) high and has a base diameter of 1,200 metres (3,900 ft). It may be considered a composite volcano. The volcano has generated three lava flows which cover a surface area of 45 square kilometres (17 sq mi). They reach a thickness of 10 metres (33 ft).

The volcano has erupted alkali basalts typical for rift zone volcanoes. Its composition has been characterized as hawaiite. Titanium dioxide contents of 3.81% have been measured. The helium-3/helium-4 ratios approach these associated with mantle plumes.

Balagan-Tas lies on an anticline. It is associated with faulting. Further it is related to the Moma-Zoryansk rift and the Gakkel ridge, which extends to the Laptev Sea. The De Long Islands and a potentially Quaternary dyke complex of the Viliga river may also be related. This tectonic activity is related to the interaction between the Eurasian Plate and the North American Plate.

Other volcanoes are found in the neighbourhood. Northwest of Balagan-Tas lies the Uraga Khaya volcano; it is located at 66.1°N 145.4°E and is a lava dome formed by rhyolite. Its age is unclear; potassium-argon dating has yielded an age of 16.6 mya but its appearance indicates it may be considerably younger. A further volcano may exist northwest of this centre. A liparite dome named Majak is located at 66.45°N 147.15°E, but it may be the same as Uraga Khaya and the coordinates wrong.

Potassium-argon dating of Balagan-Tas has yielded an age of 266,000 ± 30,000 years ago, comparable to Anyuj volcano, and may reflect a regional or global pulse of volcanic activity. Other sources consider the volcano late Holocene in age, or even as active during historical times. Hot springs are found southeast of Balagan-Tas. They reach temperatures of 30 °C (86 °F), which together with the other activity indicates a hot upper mantle. If reports of activity of the supposed Indighirsky volcano in the 1770s refer to Balagan-Tas, then this volcano may have had historical activity, one of the few outside of Kamchatka in continental Asia.
