= Silvia Cuminetti =

Italian ski mountaineer

Personal information
- Born: 29 January 1985 (age 41) Bergamo, Italy

Sport
- Sport: Skiing
- Club: CAMOSCI-Gruppo Alpinisti Bergamaschi

Silvia Cuminetti (born 29 January 1985), is an Italian ski mountaineer.

Cuminetti was born in Bergamo. She started ski mountaineering in 2001 and competed first in the "Gara in Val di Rezzalo" race in Bormio in the same year. She has been a member of the national team since 2002. She is a member of the CAMOSCI-Gruppo Alpinisti Bergamaschi.

== Selected results ==
- 2007:
  - 3rd, European Championship vertical race "espoirs" class
  - 4th, European Championship single race "espoirs" class
  - 8th, World Cup total ranking (3rd, "espoirs" class ranking)
- 2008:
  - 9th, World Championship team race (together with Tamara Lunger)

=== Pierra Menta ===
- 2007: 1st, "espoirs" class race together with Tamara Lunger
- 2010: 10th, together with Cristina Foppoli

=== Trofeo Mezzalama ===
- 2007: 5th, together with Tamara Lunger and Fabienne Chanoine
