= Au chien qui fume =

Restaurant and Historic Monument in Paris, France

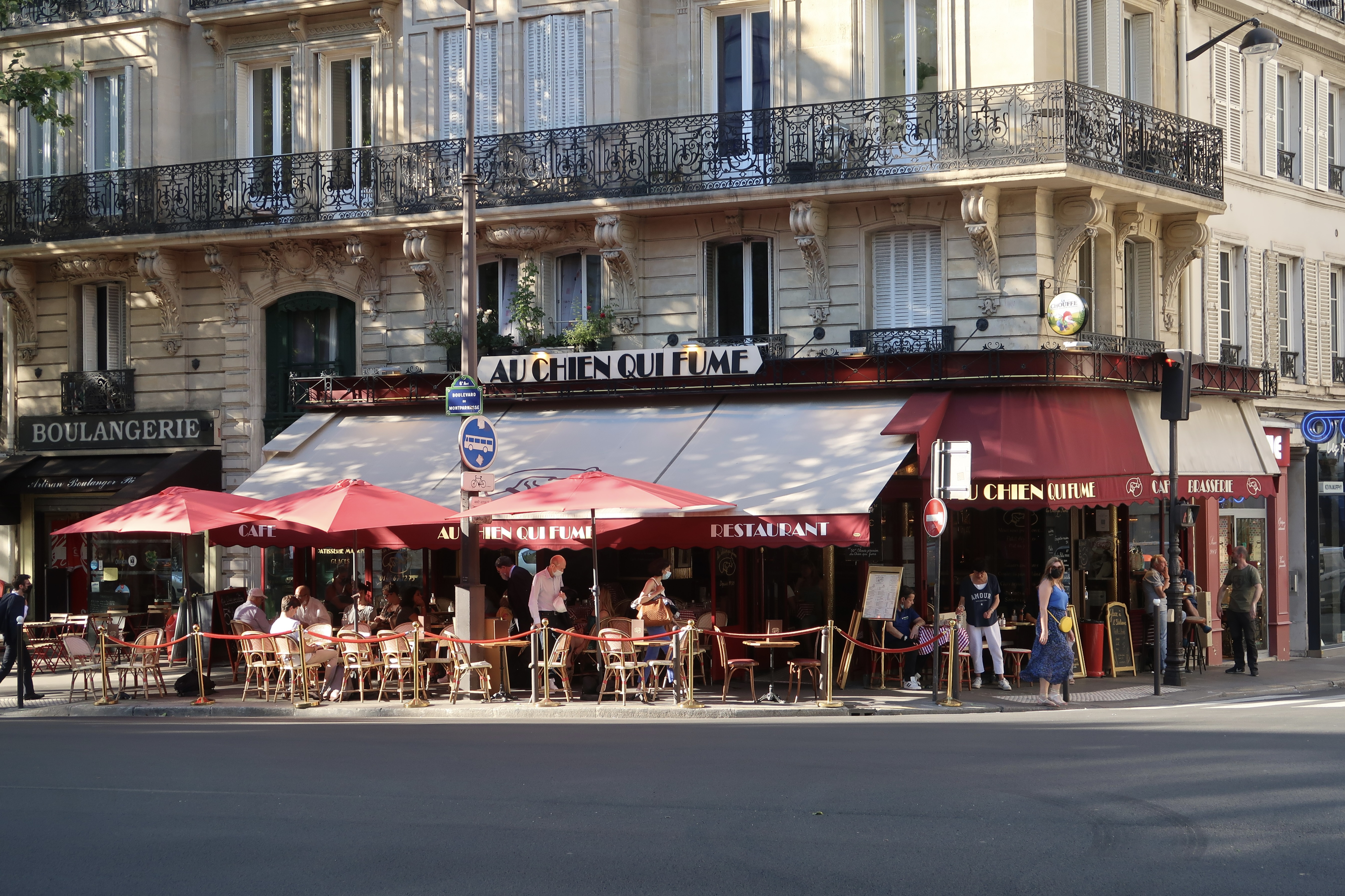

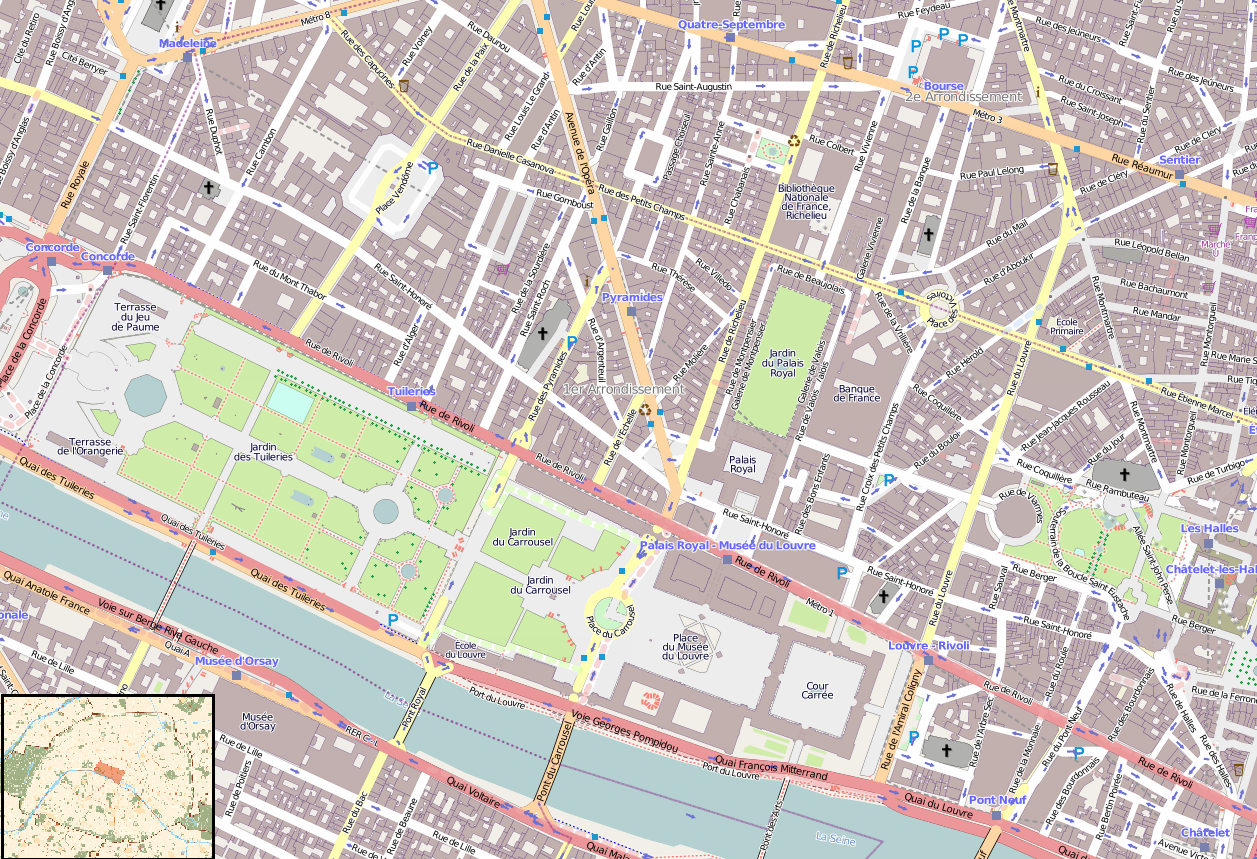
- Location within Paris Location within 1st arrondissement of Paris
- 48.861333°N 2.344861°E
- Type: French restaurant
- Location: 33, rue du Pont-Neuf; 1st arrondissement of Paris; France

Monument historique
- Official name: Bar-restaurant Au chien qui fume
- Designated: 23 May 1984
- Reference no.: PA00085783

Au chien qui fume is a traditional French restaurant located in the 1st arrondissement of Paris, France. It is listed as a Historic Monument.

== Location ==
The restaurant is located at 33 Rue du Pont-Neuf, close to the Métro stations Louvre - Rivoli (Line 1) and Les Halles (Line 4).

== History ==
The Rue du Pont-Neuf was built in the second half of the 19th century, as well as the building at No. 33. A café was opened on the ground floor.

== Description ==
In the front window, four signs show smoking dogs and extensive text. The inner room features wooden counters adorned with dog heads.

== See also ==
- List of monuments historiques in Paris
