= Moma Airport =

Airport in Russia

- IATA: MQJ; ICAO: UEMA

Summary
- Airport type: Public
- Serves: Khonuu, Momsky District, Sakha Republic, Russia
- Elevation AMSL: 200 m / 656 ft
- Coordinates: 66°27′21″N 143°15′11″E

Maps
- Sakha Republic in Russia

- Location of the airport in the Sakha Republic

Runways
Direction	Length		Surface
Direction	m	ft	Surface
16/34	1,800	5,906	Concrete
- Sources: GCM, STV

Moma Airport (Russian: Аэропорт Мома, Yakut: Муома аэропорда, romanized: Muoma aeroporda) (IATA: MQJ, ICAO: UEMA) is an airport in Sakha Republic, Russia, located 1 kilometre (0.62 mi) east of Khonuu, Momsky District. It handles small transport aircraft and contains an extremely small layout.

== Airline and destination ==
Airlines	Destinations
Polar Airlines	Yakutsk

== See also ==
- Moma Natural Park
- List of airports in Russia
