= Moma Range =

Mountain range in Russia

- Момский хребет / Муома сиһэ
- Location within Sakha Republic

Highest point
- Peak: Unnamed
- Elevation: 2,533 m (8,310 ft)

Dimensions
- Length: 470 km (290 mi) NW / SE

Geography
- Location: Sakha Republic, Far Eastern Federal District
- Range coordinates: 66°35′34″N 144°46′29″E
- Parent range: Momsko-Chersk Region, East Siberian System

Climbing
- Easiest route: From Khonuu

The Moma Range (Russian: Момский хребет, Momsky Khrebet; Yakut: Муома сиһэ, romanized: Muoma sihe) is a range of mountains in far North-eastern Russia. Administratively the range is part of the Sakha Republic of the Russian Federation. The nearest town is Khonuu, served by Moma Airport.

== Etymology ==
The name originated in the Evenki language, where "мома" means wood, timber or tree.

== Geography ==
The Moma Range extends from NW to SE for almost 500 kilometres (310 mi) southeast of the southern end of the Selennyakh Range and north of the Ulakhan-Chistay Range, the highest subrange of the Chersky Range system. It is parallel to the latter and separated from it by a wide intermontane basin, where the Moma River flows from the southeast and joins the Indigirka. Turning northwards, the Indigirka River cuts deeply across the range in its northwestern part. The Aby Lowland, part of the Yana-Indigirka Lowland, lies to the north and the Alazeya Plateau to the east.

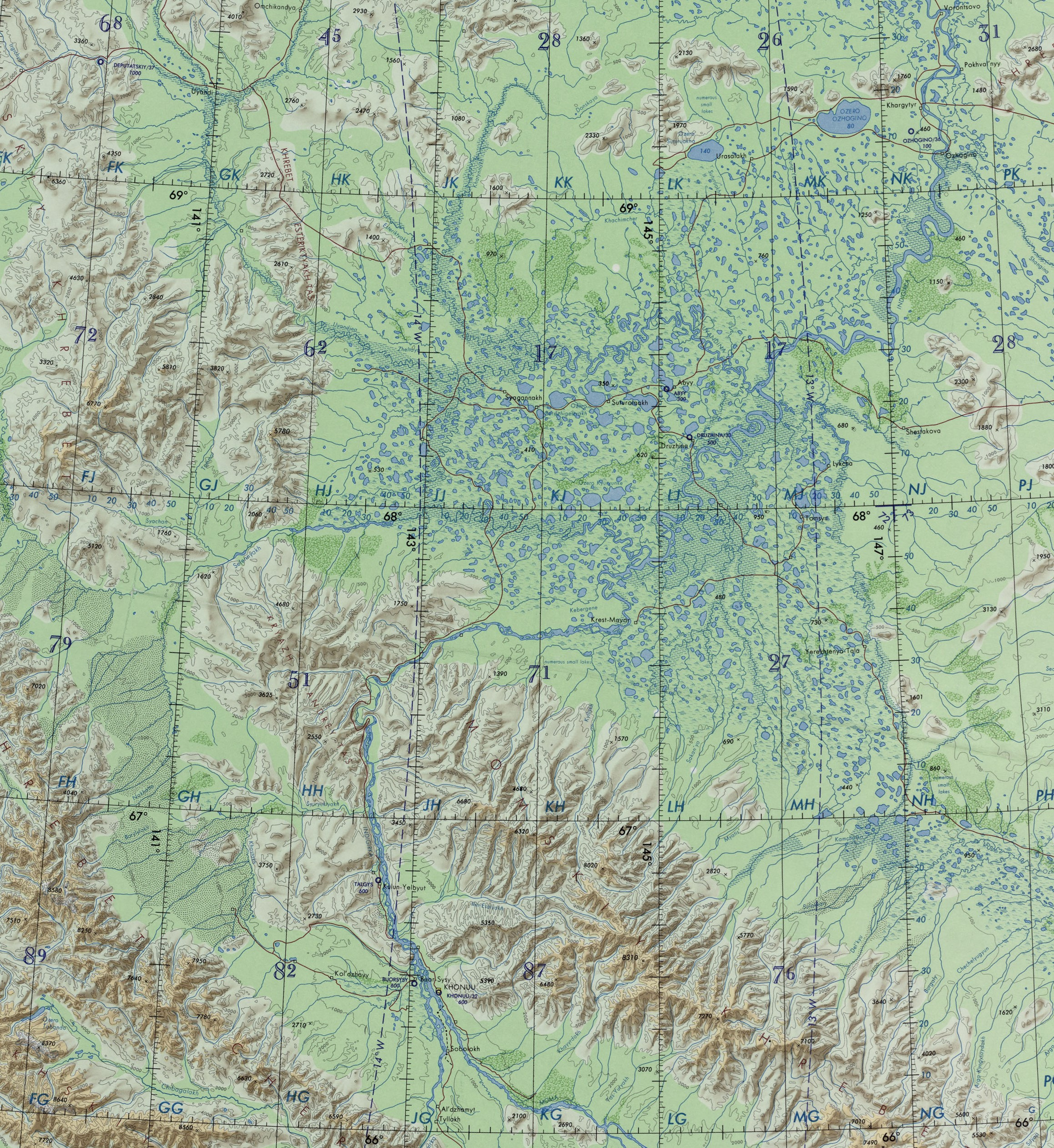
The Moma Range below and the Aby Lowland on the upper right half of the image.

The highest point of the Moma Range is an unnamed 2,533 metres (8,310 ft) high peak located very near the Arctic Circle. Rivers Badyarikha, a tributary of the Indigirka, and Ozhogina, a tributary of the Kolyma, flow from the northern slopes of the Moma Range.

In some works the Moma Range is included in the Chersky mountain system.

== See also ==
- List of ultras of Northeast Asia
