= Chybagylaakh =

Location in Yakutia, Russia

Chybagylaakh is a populated place in Yakutia, Russia.
