= La Samaritaine =

French department store

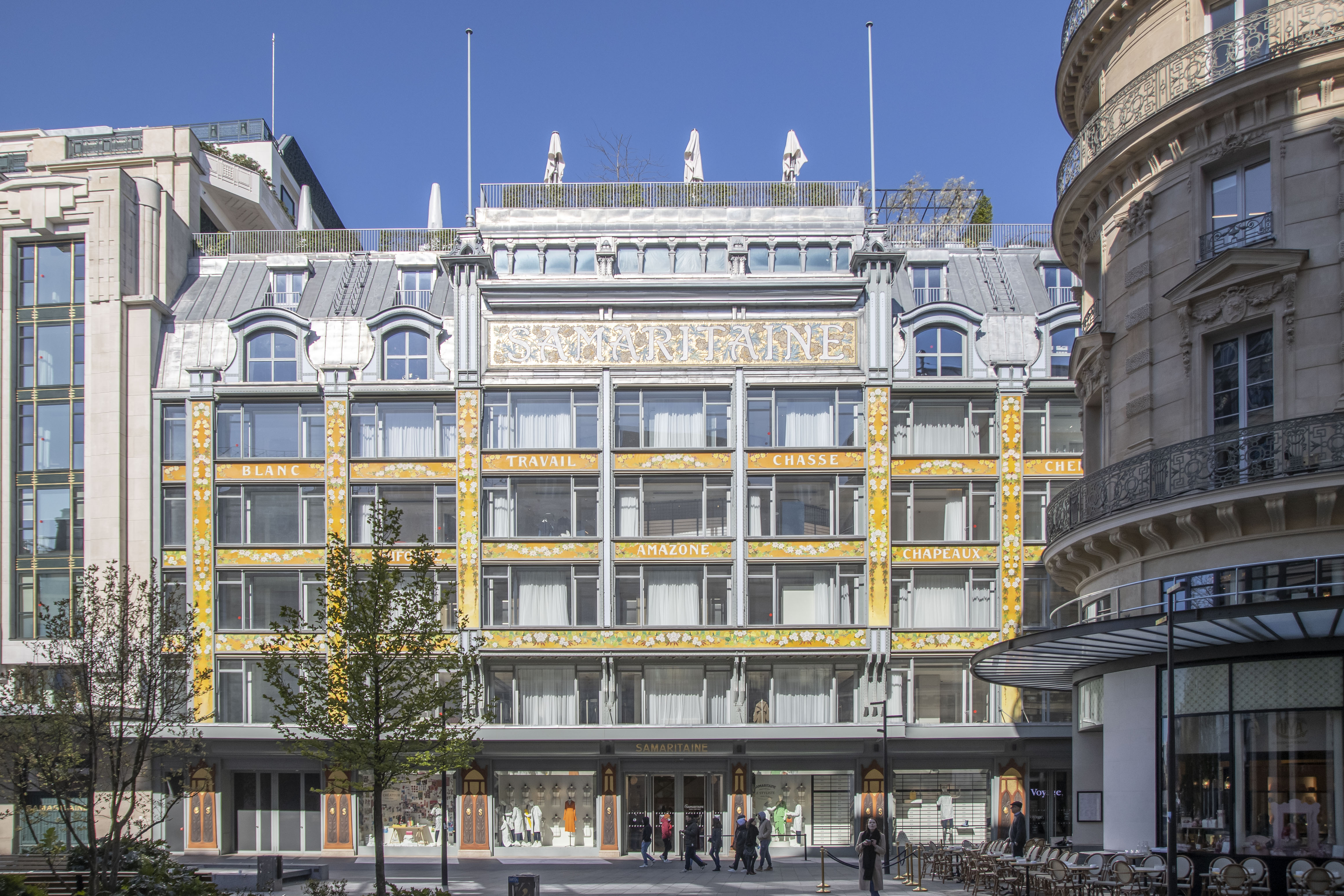
- Front of the store on Rue de la Monnaie

General information
- Type: Department store
- Architectural style: Art Nouveau, Art Deco
- Location: Paris, France
- Coordinates: 48°51′32″N 2°20′31.5″E
- Opened: 1870
- Owner: Groupe Bon Marché; LVMH

Technical details
- Floor area: 48,000 m^{2}

Website
- dfs.com/samaritaine

La Samaritaine (French pronunciation: [la samaʁitɛn]) is a large department store in the first arrondissement of Paris, France. The nearest metro station is Pont-Neuf. Established in 1870 by Ernest Cognacq, it is now owned by the luxury goods conglomerate LVMH (through Groupe Bon Marché).

== History ==
=== 1870–1930s: Early years and expansion ===
In 1870 Ernest Cognacq opened La Samaritaine, on the corner of Rue du Pont-Neuf and Rue de la Monnaie. In 1872 Cognacq married Marie-Louise Jaÿ, and they began to manage the store together. The store was named after the old Samaritaine pumping station, which until 1813 had stood on the second arch of the nearby Pont Neuf.

The interiors of magasin one (magasin means "store" in French) were redesigned in 1891, and the project was overseen by architect Frantz Jourdain. He also designed magasin two, which opened in 1910. Much of magasin two had been pre-fabricated, allowing the construction to occur rapidly. Magasin one's façade was also updated to match magasin two.

By the time the store's remodel and expansion was finished in 1910 the style of the new buildings were outdated and when the decision was made to expand in the 1920s city officials allowed for the expansion only if specifications of the city were followed (these specifications centred around a more current architectural style). This was done with little opposition from Cognacq and Jourdain as both were aware that now magasin one and two were outdated in style.

Between 1926 and 1928, Jourdain and Henri Sauvage worked together designing the stores extension towards the river Seine. By the end of this partnership the Samaritaine was made up of four buildings and was eleven floors in height.

In 1930 and 1932 two expansions were completed designed by Jourdain.

After Ernest Cognacq's death, the store was directed by his nephew Gabriel Cognacq and Georges Renand.

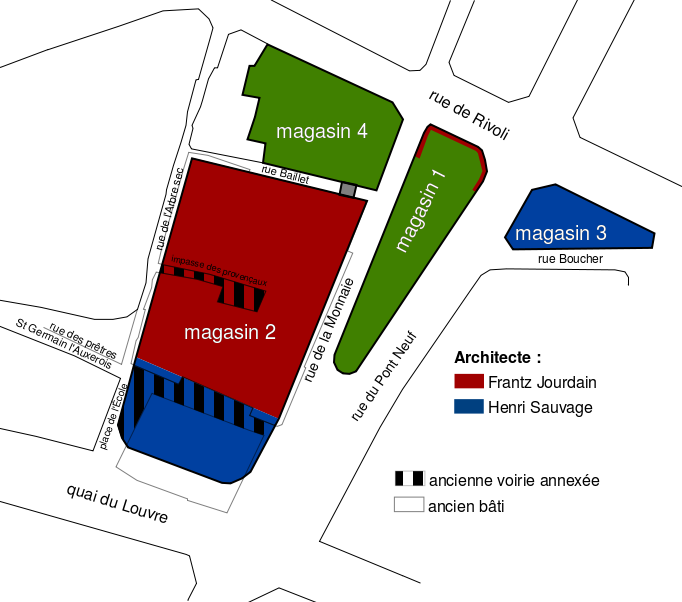
Plan of the store buildings (2013)

=== 1970s–present: Decline, closure and reopening ===
From the 1970s the company's profits began to decline.

Samaritaine was a founding anchor store at Les Quatre Temps in 1981, but the store closed two years later.

Since 1990 the buildings have been listed as a monument historique by the French Ministry of Culture.

A majority stake in La Samaritaine was purchased by LVMH in 2001.

The store was closed on 15 June 2005, as the building needed urgent renovations to mitigate fire safety hazards. However labour unions believed it was because of a restructure of the store.

LVMH purchased the remaining shares in the department store from the Cognacq-Jay foundation in late 2010, giving LVMH full ownership of the department store. The redevelopment was planned to begin in 2011.

In January 2015 work on the store was halted again after building permission was revoked by a French Court. Work started again despite opposition to the new facades designed by Japanese architecture firm SANAA. The mayor of Paris Anne Hidalgo supported the plans.

After sixteen years of closure, the department store was reopened to the public in June 2021, now co-branded as part of DFS. The store was reopened by French President Emmanuel Macron and the CEO of LVMH, Bernard Arnault. The buildings now include a Cheval Blanc hotel, nursery, offices and social housing.

The renovation, reported to have cost $750 million, involved a range of architecture and interior design firms, including SANAA, SRA Architects, Peter Marino, Maison Edouard François, Yabu Pushelberg, Malherbe Paris, Studio Ciguë, Jean-François Lagneau, Lagneau Architectes, François Brugel Architectes Associés, Egis, Vinci Construction France, Frener & Reifer, SMB-CCS, Viry, Socra, AOF, and Atelier Bouvier.

As of 2024 the store is struggling to attract customers.

== Building design and style ==
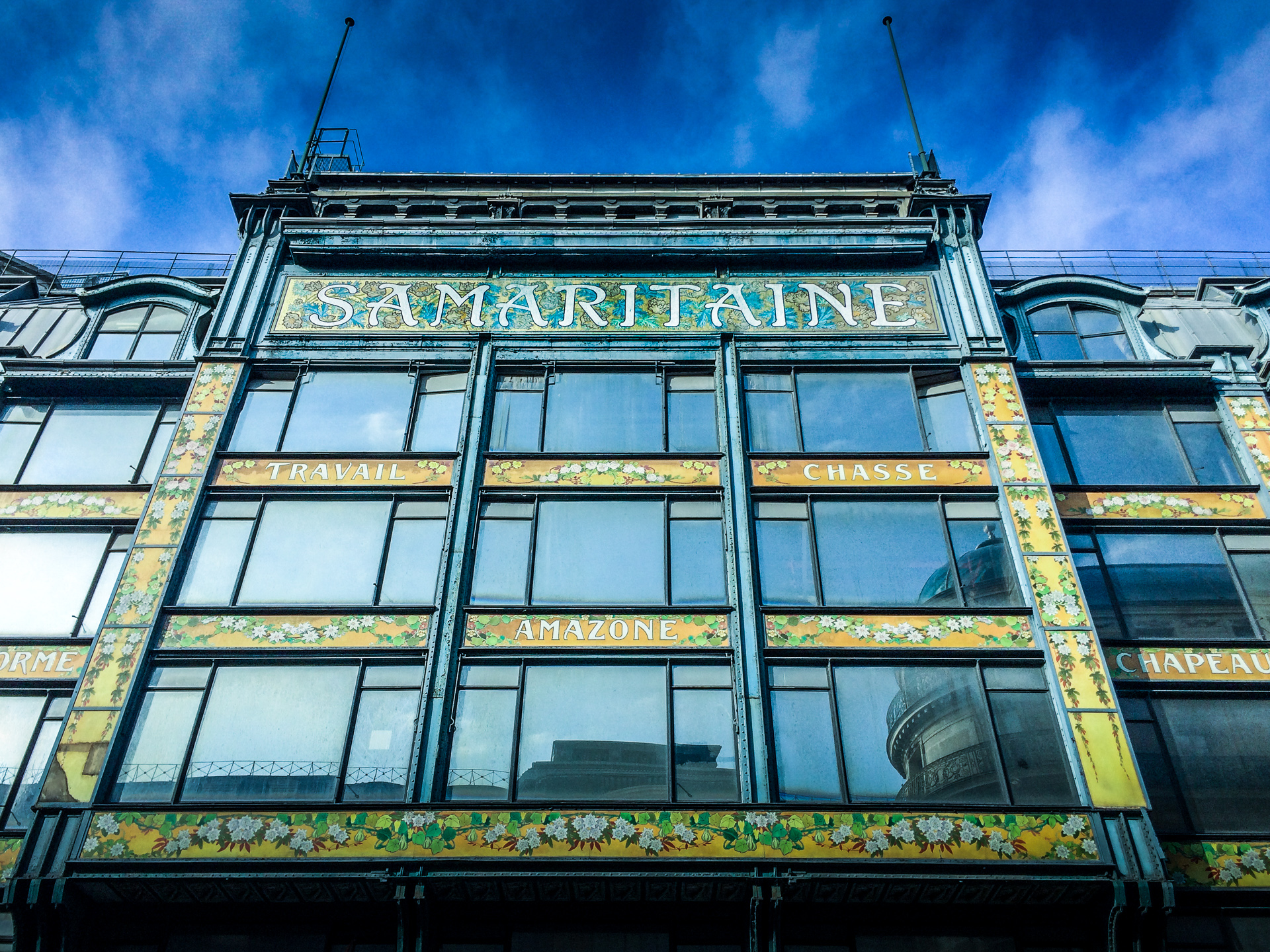
Art Nouveau façade

Jourdain's membership in multiple societies heavily influenced his personal architectural theory and design choices for the Samaritaine. Jourdain was the president of the Societe du Nouveau during the height of the Art Nouveau movement. The building's original design heavily embodies the ideals of this artistic style. While the skeletal structure of the department store is constructed of steel and glass, the building contains many applied adornments which lessen the harshness of its rigid structure. The building's exterior has two domes made of glass brick that light up in the nighttime. The extended verticals of the domes, sectioned into eight sides, accentuate the height of the building and draw the viewer's eye to the top of the store. The facade of the building consists of ceramic panels in brightly colored hues of yellow, white, green, and gold. The word "Samaritaine", as well as some of the available merchandise and ware, are displayed around the facade of the building in colorful enamel using an elaborate lettering. Dispersed around these signs are colorful naturalistic flower motifs, which continue to the interior design of the building as well. The interior features decorative iron staircases, glass tile floors, and frescoes using the repeated floral motif. These elements encompass both ornament and functionality which are core principles of the Art Nouveau movement. The foundational ideas of Art Nouveau, and the Samaritaine, led the way to the modern movements of the 1920s.

== The department store as a type and consumerism ==
The main fundamental difference that distinguishes the department store from other stores is its offering of low-priced, mass-produced goods of a wide variety. Prices were able to be placed just slightly above wholesale as the volume of sales was able to compensate for the small margin. Typically, department stores are located centrally within a city and are in close proximity to transportation. Different department stores targeted people of different class distinctions. However, their main audience is the middle-class city dwellers who were highly conscious of their status. The Samaritaine, in particular, targeted the working class who constantly traveled through the first arrondissement for work. The goal of the department store is to move the consumer through the building and to its upper floors in order to maximize the number of counters an individual has to pass. This posed as a bit of a challenge as their target audience was so used to shopping along the street level at various small boutiques. Architects had to entice these shoppers by utilizing grand and decorative elements to allure consumers to explore the building.

=== Features ===
The department store is constantly changing to keep up with the architectural trends, yet remains somewhat constant in its appearance as a building type. The design and decor of the building played a major role in enticing the human desire for the consumption of material goods. The common use of iron allowed for minimal skeletal structure and therefore maximized the amount of light that could flow through the interior and allowed more room for the circulation of customers. Many of the structural elements utilized reference to the international exhibition halls built a few years before the original department stores. Another common feature is the monumental stair design, a design element of the first department store, Bon Marche. It was later installed in the Samaritaine as well as other department stores constructed at the turn of the century. The Samaritaine also had the common department store design feature: the light court. The skeletal steel structure allowed for a maximum square footage of glass windows which was intentionally located at the center of the building to bring in ample natural light. The glazed corner rotunda became another crucial element of Parisian department store architecture. It served as a large space for display cases that could be seen by many pedestrians waiting on the street corner. The corner rotunda was also utilized as the entrance of the building, leaving the consumer with two options of vastly-stretching display windows upon entering the building. Finally, the use of a dome structure, and their strategic placement, was useful in identifying the department store as a type. The two domes of the Samaritaine create a sight line between the Seine and the left bank.

=== Consumerism ===
The organization of each individual department within the stores is based on consumption patterns. For example, impulse items, such as jewelry and cosmetics, were placed on the street floor. This would encourage consumers to make quick impulse buys upon entering or right before leaving the store. Also, demand items, such as children's clothing or household goods, were located on the upper levels. This would force consumers to move past all of the lower level departments before they reached their desired location, maximizing the opportunity for the individual to make an unplanned purchase. Once the Samaritaine consisted of four Magasins, the first was dedicated as a department store solely for women's clothing while the other three were for items such as supplies and tools.
