= Peak Pobeda (Sakha) =

Mountain in Russia

- Yakut: Победа хайа
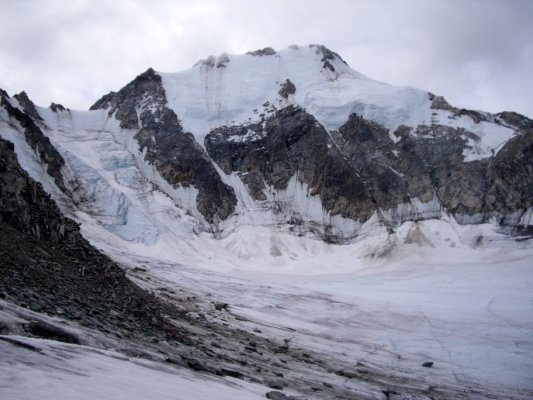
- The north-east face of Peak Pobeda

Highest point
- Elevation: 3,003 m (9,852 ft)
- Prominence: 2,443 m (8,015 ft)
- Listing: Ultra, Ribu
- Coordinates: 65°10′32″N 146°00′27″E

Geography
- Location within Sakha Republic
- Location: Sakha Republic, Russia
- Parent range: Buordakh Massif, Ulakhan-Chistay, Chersky Range

Climbing
- Easiest route: From Ust-Nera, 180 km to the SW

Peak Pobeda (Russian: Победа, "Victory"; Yakut: Победа Xайа, romanized: Pobeda Qaỹa) is a mountain in Sakha Republic, Russia.

This mountain is one of the main features of the Moma Natural Park.

== Geography ==
At 3,003 m (9,852 ft), it is the highest peak of the Chersky Range and of the East Siberian mountain system, as well as the highest mountain of Yakutia.

The mountain is located in the Buordakh Massif, part of the Ulakhan-Chistay Range, a subrange of the Chersky mountain system.

== Climbing history ==
Italian climbers Simone Moro and Tamara Lunger achieved the first winter ascent of Peak Pobeda on February 12, 2018. They reported that the temperature was about -40°C (-40°F) at base camp when they made their ascent.

== See also ==
- List of highest points of Russian federal subjects
- List of mountains and hills of Russia
- List of ultras of Northeast Asia
