= Moma Clarke =

British journalist

Maria Elvins Clarke née Pountney (1869 – 20 June 1958) was a British journalist based in Paris from the early 1900s until 1937 who wrote under the name Moma Clarke. She was the Paris fashion correspondent for the British newspaper The Times from the early 1910s until 1937, also writing articles about topics including the theatre, the arts, and Parisian life.

She was born Maria Elvins Pountney in Great Barr, Staffordshire, England, 1869. Her parents were Benjamin Pountney and Ellen (born Spencer). She had an older brother, Frederick Spencer Pountney, who was also a journalist. After the death of their parents, the siblings travelled in Europe and visited Paris. On 19 August 1903, Maria married Herbert Edward Clarke, an English publisher living and working in Paris, owner of the Imprimerie Vendôme at 338 Rue St-Honoré. Herbert died in 1931, and Moma Clarke lived in Paris until 1937, when she returned to Britain. After World War II, Clarke resided at Turleigh Cottage, in the village of Turleigh near Bradford on Avon, Wiltshire, moving to Rivers St in Bath in 1952. She died in Worthing, Sussex on 20 June 1958.

She published several books, including Paris Waits, 1914 (1915); Cameos of French Life (1925); Paris (1929); Versailles (1930); Light and Shade in France (1939); and A Stranger Within the Gates (1942).
