= Ulakhan-Chistay Range =

Mountain range in eastern Russia

- Улахан-Чистай
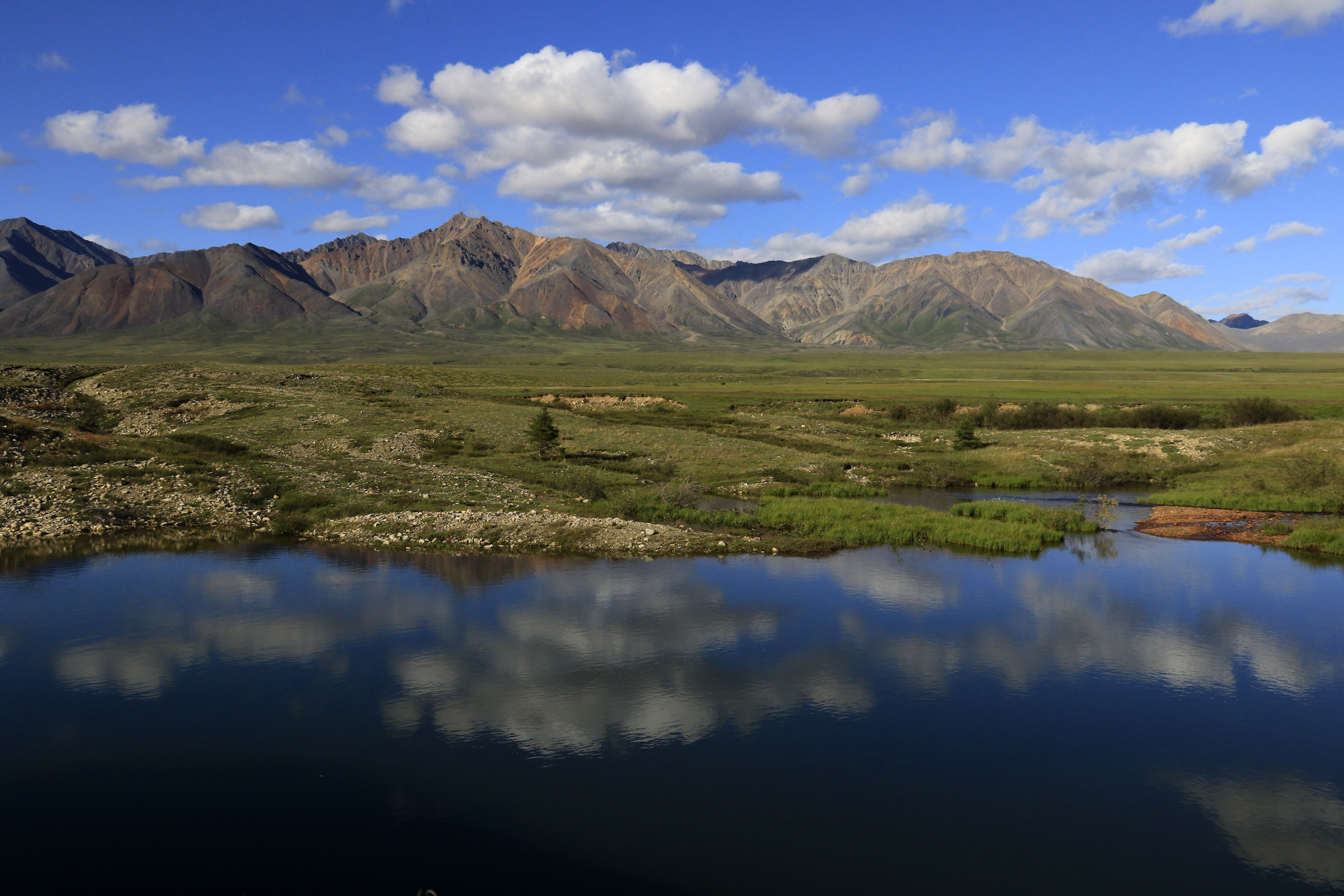
- A ridge of the Ulakhan-Chistay Range reflected on Lake Buyunge

Highest point
- Peak: Mount Pobeda
- Elevation: 3,003 m (9,852 ft)
- Coordinates: 65°8′N 145°59′E

Dimensions
- Length: 250 km (160 mi) NW / SE

Geography
- Location within Sakha Republic
- Location: Sakha Republic, Far Eastern Federal District
- Parent range: Chersky Range, East Siberian System

Geology
- Rock type: Granite

The Ulakhan-Chistay Range (Russian: Улахан-Чистай; Yakut: Улахан Чыыстай сис, romanized: Ulaxan Çııstay sis) is a range of mountains in far North-eastern Russia. Administratively the range is part of the Sakha Republic of the Russian Federation.

A section of the range, including the upper course of the Moma River basin, as well as the Buordakh Massif with Mount Pobeda, is part of the Moma Natural Park, one of the protected areas of Russia.

== Geography ==
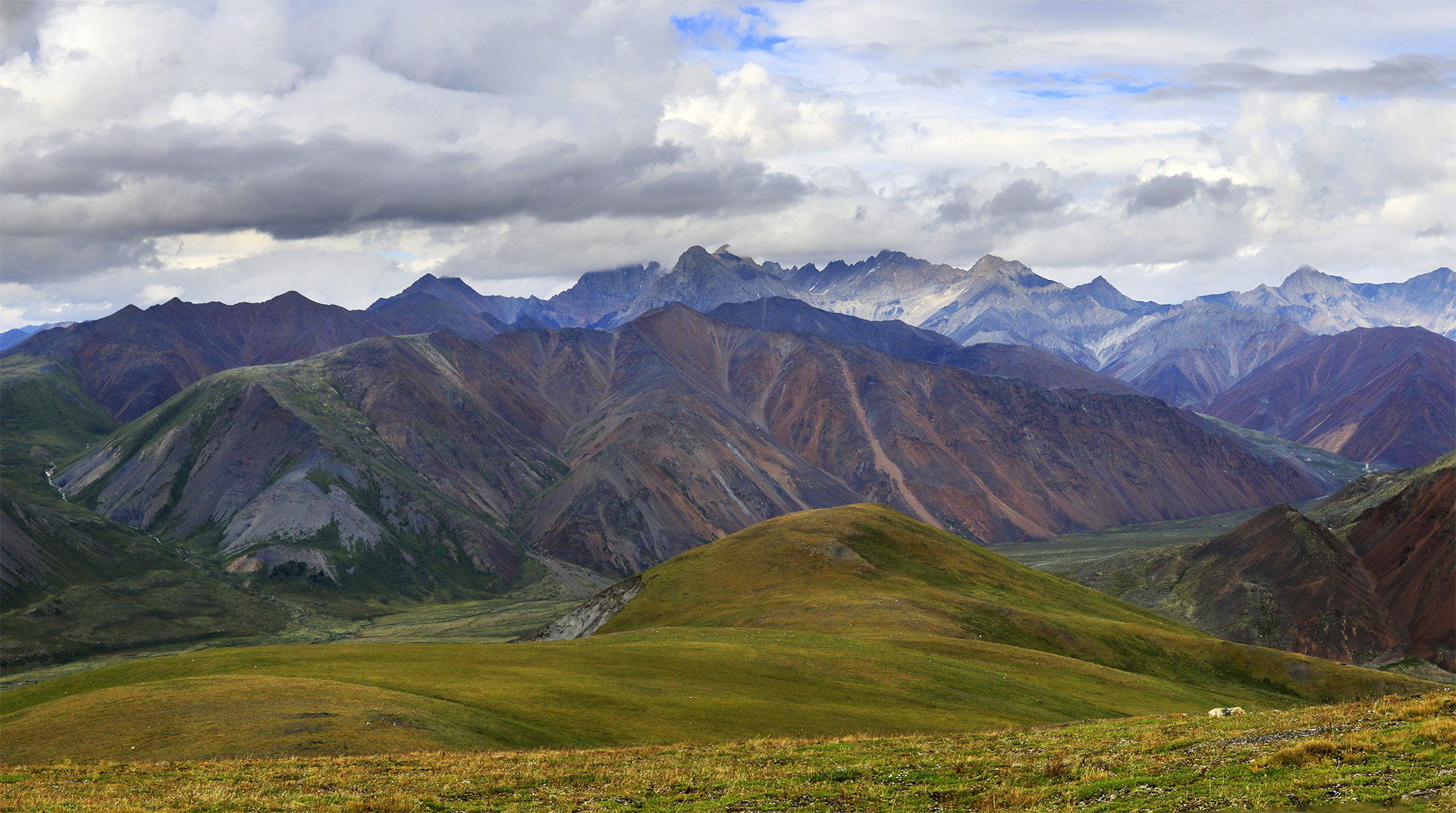
View of the Buordakh Massif, where the highest elevations of the range are found.

The Ulakhan-Chistay Range is the highest subrange of the Chersky Range system. It displays a clear Alpine relief and extends from NW to SE for about 250 kilometres (160 mi) south of the Moma Range. It is parallel to the latter and separated from it by a wide intermontane basin, where the Ulakhan-Chistay River and the Moma River flow from the southeast and join the Indigirka. From the southwest, the range is bound by the Erikit River, a left tributary of the Moma, and the Nera Plateau, beyond which rises the Tas-Kystabyt, also known as (the Sarychev Range).

The highest point of the Ulakhan-Chistay Range is 3,003 metres (9,852 ft) high Mount Pobeda. It is the highest mountain of the Chersky Range and also the highest of Yakutia. In the range there are glaciers with a total area of about 100 square kilometres (39 sq mi).

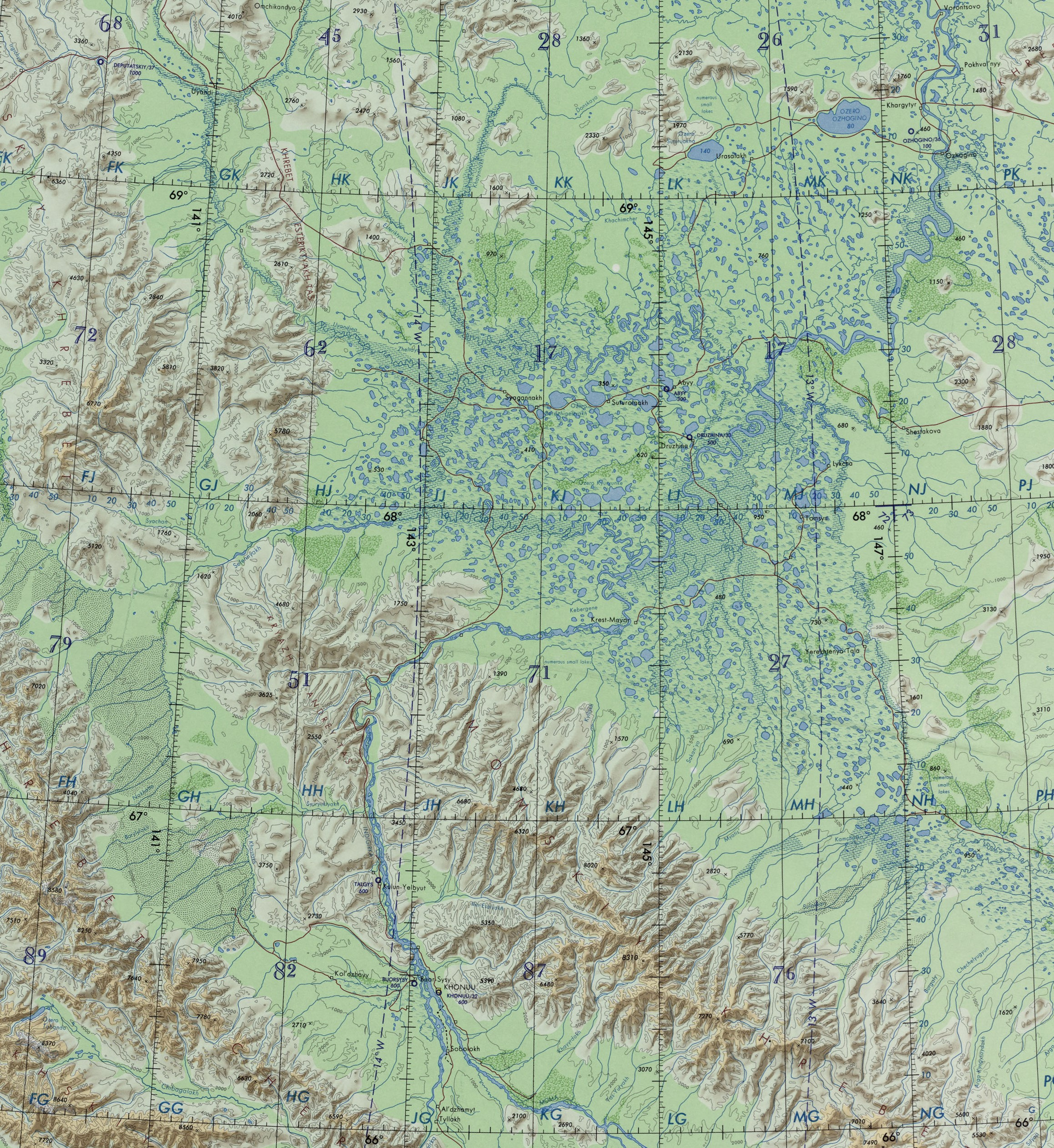
Part of the Ulakhan-Chistay Range on the bottom left side of the image.

== See also ==
- Chersky-Kolyma mountain tundra
