= Quartier Saint-Germain-l'Auxerrois =

Coordinates: 48.8614725°N 2.3368747°E

Saint-Germain-l'Auxerrois
- Quartier Saint-Germain-l'Auxerrois
- Napoleon III's Louvre expansion
- Interactive map of Saint-Germain-l'Auxerrois
- Country: France
- Region: Île-de-France
- Ville: Paris
- Arrondissement: 1st

Area
  - Total: 0.869 km^{2} (0.336 sq mi)

Population (2016)
  - Total: 1,401
  - Density: 1,612/km^{2} (4,180/sq mi)

The Quartier Saint-Germain-l'Auxerrois is the first administrative district of Paris, forming part of the 1st arrondissement.

Covering an area of 87.1 hectares, it encompasses the section of the Île de la Cité west of Boulevard du Palais, as well as the area of the 1st arrondissement on the Right Bank of the Seine—specifically south of Rue de Rivoli and between Boulevard de Sébastopol and Place de la Concorde.

The majority of the area is occupied by the Louvre Palace and the Tuileries Garden, along with the Palais de Justice; consequently, the only inhabited parts are the tip of the Île de la Cité and the area between Boulevard de Sébastopol and Rue de l'Amiral-de-Coligny. The district takes its name from the Late Gothic parish church of Saint-Germain l'Auxerrois, where the royal family from the nearby Louvre Palace attended services.

== Description ==
The four administrative districts of the 1st arrondissement of Paris.

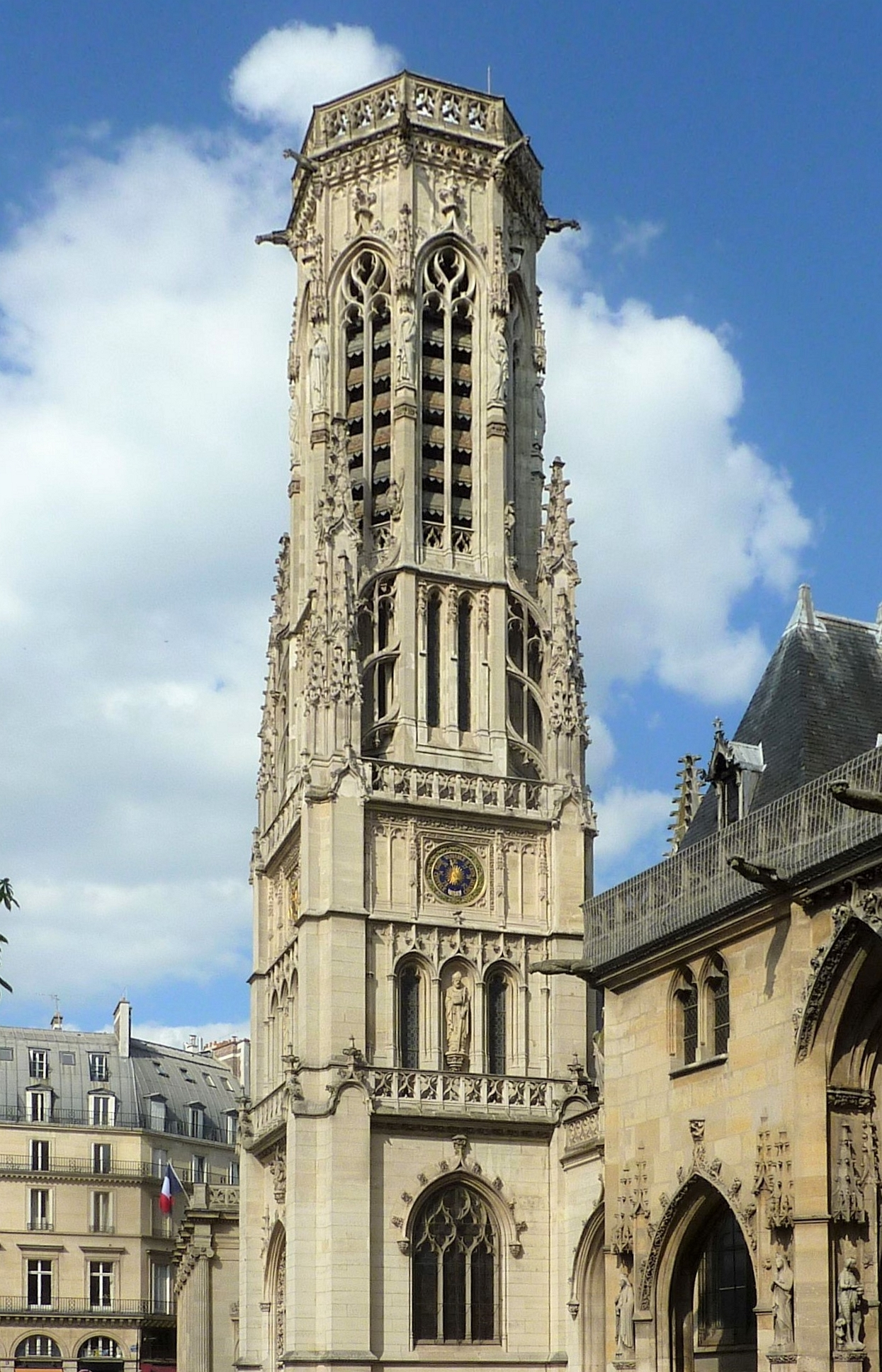
Saint-Germain-l’Auxerrois.

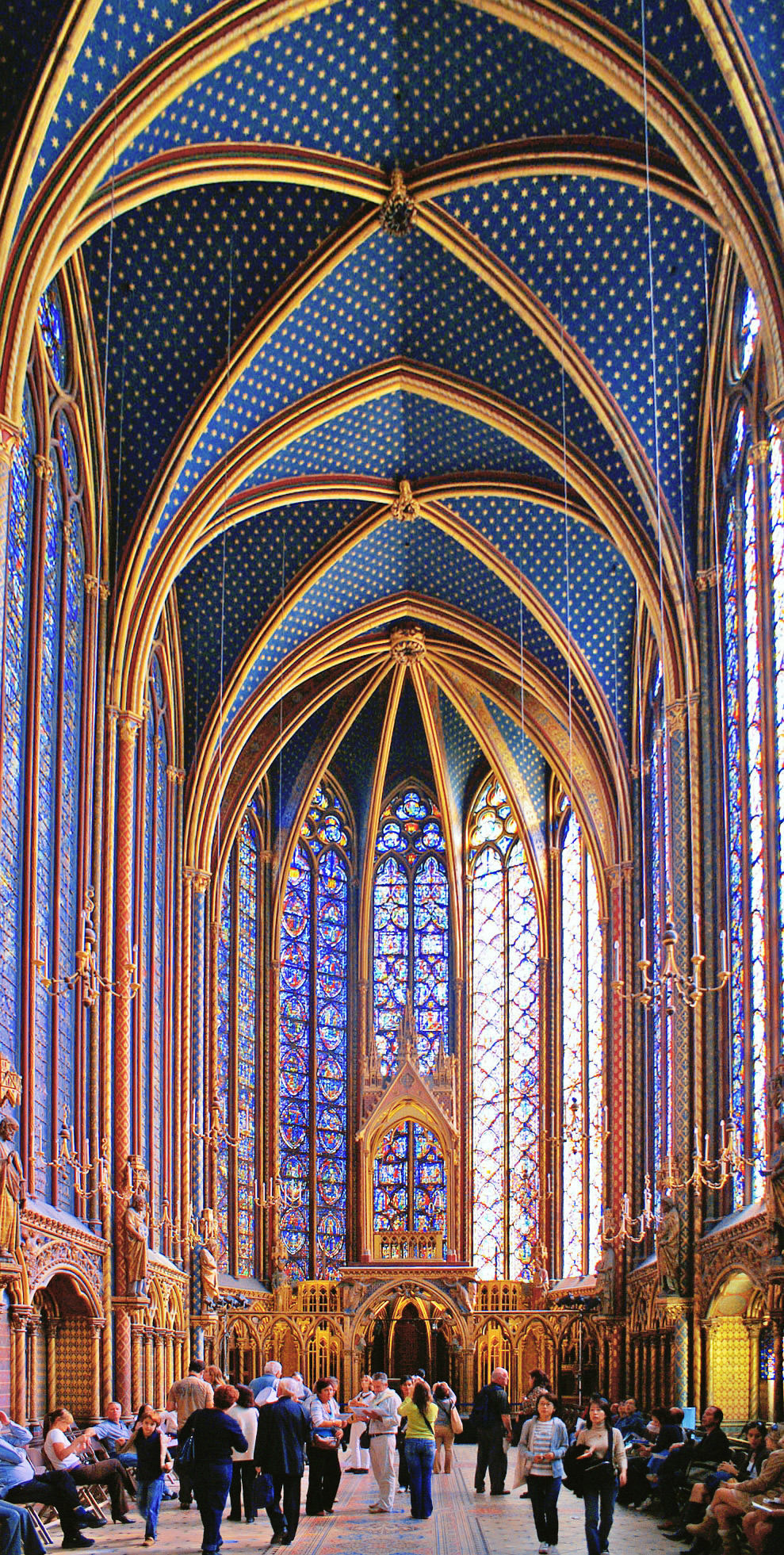
Sainte-Chapelle.

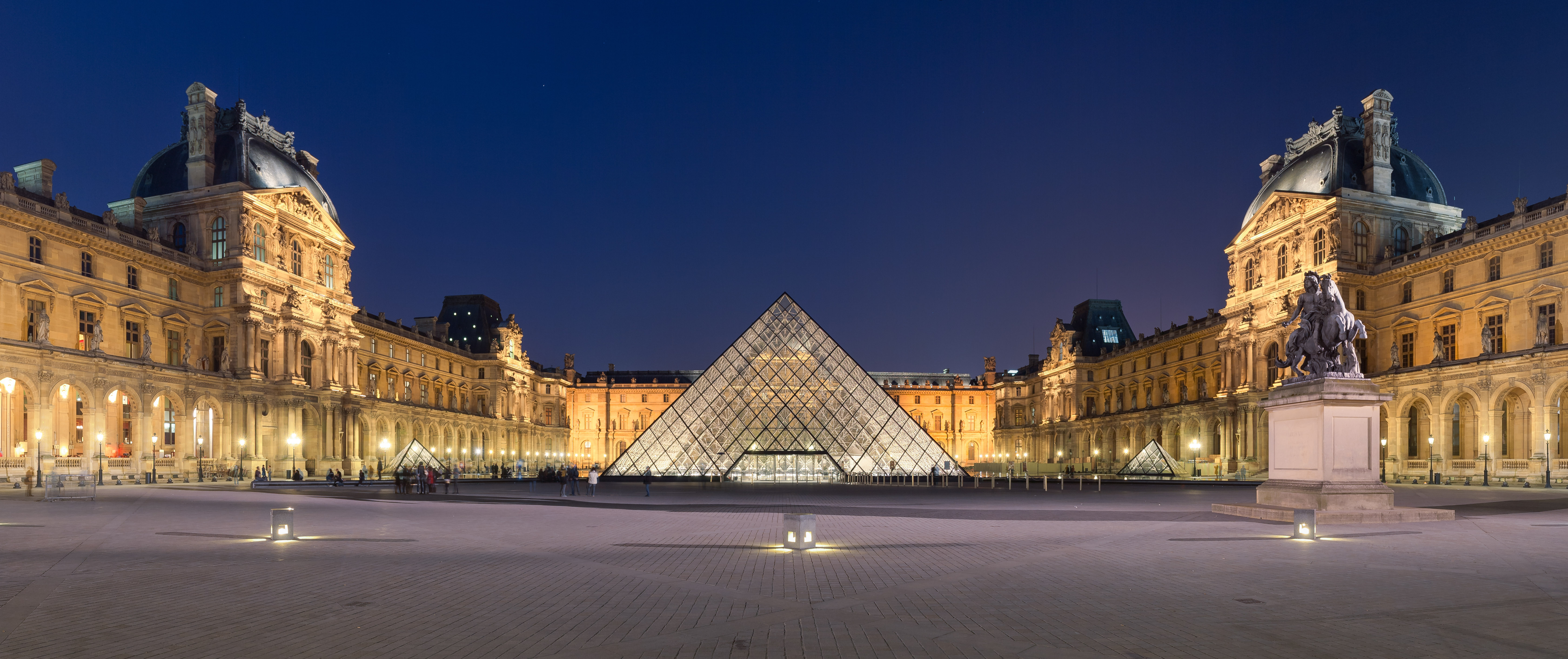
Louvre.
