= Moma (river) =

River in Yakutia, Russia

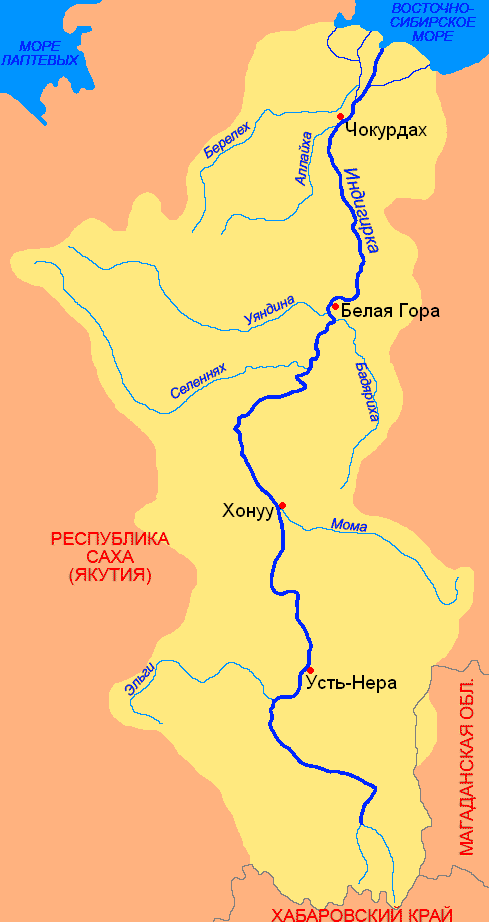
- Indigirka Basin

Location
- Country: Russia

Physical characteristics
- Source
  - location: Lake Sisyktyah
  - elevation: 703 metres (2,306 ft)
- Mouth: Indigirka
  - coordinates: 66°26′10″N 143°10′55″E
  - elevation: 192 metres (630 ft)
- Length: 406 km (252 mi)
- Basin size: 30,200 km^{2} (11,700 sq mi)

Basin features
- Progression: Indigirka→ East Siberian Sea

The Moma (Russian: Мома; Yakut: Муома, Muoma) is a river in Yakutia in Russia, a right tributary of the Indigirka. The length of the river is 406 kilometres (252 mi), the area of its drainage basin is 30,200 square kilometres (11,700 mi^{2}).

The extinct cinder cone volcanoes Balagan-Tas and Uraga-Tas are some of the main features of Moma Natural Park.

== Course ==
The Moma originates from Lake Sisyktyah on the northern slope of the Ulakhan Chistay Range, the highest subrange of the Chersky Range. The river flows in the wide intermontane basin separating the Ulakhan Chistay Range from the Moma Range in the north and flows into the Indigirka about 1,086 kilometres (675 mi) from its mouth.

There are black coal deposits in the river basin. The district centre – the village of Khonuu – is located at the mouth of the river.

== Etymology ==
The name comes from the Evenki language, “мома” means "wood, timber, tree". This is the name for the rivers with steep, easy to wash banks that crumble together with trees growing on them, cluttering the river bed.

== Hydrology ==
Rain, snow and ice feed the river. It freezes in October, the ice breaks up in late May – early June. In the middle and lower courses the river bed abounds rocky rapids, icing is typical. The average annual water consumption – 377 kilometres (234 mi) from the mouth – is 11.02 cubic metres per second (389 cu ft/s). The river is not navigable.

== See also ==
- Balagan-Tas
