= Khonuu =

Khonuu Хонуу Хонуу (Sakha)
- Selo
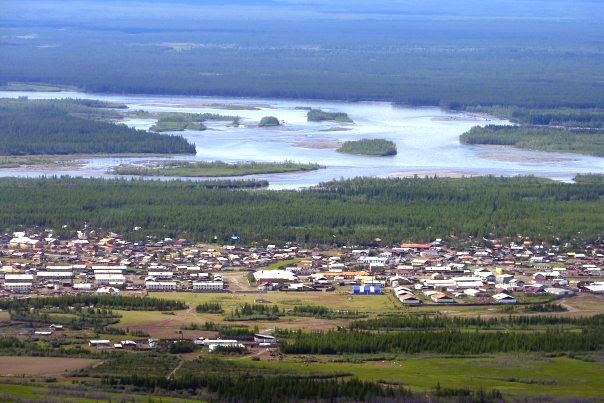

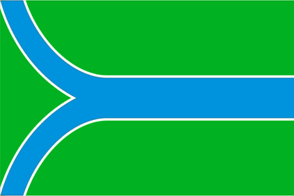
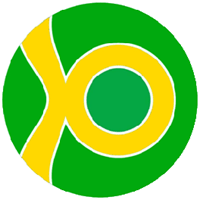
- Flag Coat of arms
- Interactive map of Khonuu
- Location of Khonuu Khonuu (Sakha Republic)
- Coordinates: 66°27′N 143°14′E
- Country: Russia
- Federal subject: Sakha Republic
- Administrative district: Momsky District
- Rural okrugSelsoviet: Momsky Rural Okrug
- Founded: 1931

Population (2010 Census)
  - Total: 2,476
  - Estimate (2021): 2,052 (−17.1%)

Administrative status
  - Capital of: Momsky District, Momsky Rural Okrug

Municipal status
  - Municipal district: Momsky Municipal District
  - Rural settlement: Momsky Rural Settlement
  - Capital of: Momsky Municipal District, Momsky Rural Settlement
- Time zone: UTC+
- Postal code: 678860
- OKTMO ID: 98633423101

Khonuu (Russian: Хонуу; Yakut: Хонуу, romanized: Xonuu) is a rural locality (a selo) and the administrative center of Momsky District in the Sakha Republic, Russia, located on the right bank of the Indigirka River. Population: 2,476 (2010 census); 2,494 (2002 census); 3,057 (1989 Soviet census).

== Geography ==
Khonuu is located approximately 800 kilometers (500 mi) northeast of the republic's capital city of Yakutsk, in the lowlands between the Moma Mountains to the northeast and the Chersky Range to the southwest. It is also situated on the right bank of the Indigirka River, just downstream of the confluence with its tributary the Moma.

== History ==
It was founded in 1931.

The nearby Moma Natural Park is a major tourist attraction that was established on 18 June 1996.

== Demographics ==
Yakuts, who are primarily hunters or reindeer herders, make up 67% of the population. Other ethnicities include Russians (15.1%), Evens (11.8%), Evenks (0.5%), and Yukaghirs (0.1%).

== Transportation ==
There are no railroads or paved roads, but there is a flight service to Yakutsk via the nearby Moma Airport.

== Climate ==
Khonuu has an extreme subarctic climate (Köppen Dfd/Dwd). Winters are extremely cold with average temperatures between −40 and −45 °C (−40 and −49 °F) and absolute minima below −60 °C (−76 °F), while summers are quite warm for the latitude with average temperatures between 12 and 17 °C (53.6 and 62.6 °F) and absolute maxima above 35 °C (95 °F). Frosts are possible in all months of the year. Precipitation is quite low but is markedly higher in summer than at other times of the year.

Climate data for Khonuu
Month	Jan	Feb	Mar	Apr	May	Jun	Jul	Aug	Sep	Oct	Nov	Dec	Year
Record high °C (°F)	−13 (9)	−4.2 (24.4)	3.7 (38.7)	11.5 (52.7)	28.5 (83.3)	35.3 (95.5)	37.8 (100.0)	34.3 (93.7)	27.1 (80.8)	15.2 (59.4)	2.7 (36.9)	−6.9 (19.6)	37.8 (100.0)
Mean daily maximum °C (°F)	−38.1 (−36.6)	−32.3 (−26.1)	−17.3 (0.9)	−2.3 (27.9)	11.1 (52.0)	21.3 (70.3)	23.4 (74.1)	19.1 (66.4)	9.6 (49.3)	−7.4 (18.7)	−26.5 (−15.7)	−37.3 (−35.1)	−6.4 (20.5)
Daily mean °C (°F)	−41.6 (−42.9)	−38.4 (−37.1)	−26.4 (−15.5)	−10.5 (13.1)	4.8 (40.6)	14.2 (57.6)	16.3 (61.3)	12.0 (53.6)	3.6 (38.5)	−12.4 (9.7)	−30.6 (−23.1)	−40.4 (−40.7)	−12.5 (9.6)
Mean daily minimum °C (°F)	−44.8 (−48.6)	−42.9 (−45.2)	−34.4 (−29.9)	−19.4 (−2.9)	−1.3 (29.7)	7.6 (45.7)	10.0 (50.0)	6.0 (42.8)	−1.2 (29.8)	−16.9 (1.6)	−34.2 (−29.6)	−43.2 (−45.8)	−17.9 (−0.2)
Record low °C (°F)	−62.1 (−79.8)	−62.1 (−79.8)	−58.1 (−72.6)	−44.8 (−48.6)	−30.2 (−22.4)	−7.1 (19.2)	−5.0 (23.0)	−11.1 (12.0)	−23.6 (−10.5)	−44.8 (−48.6)	−59.7 (−75.5)	−61.1 (−78.0)	−62.1 (−79.8)
Average precipitation mm (inches)	6 (0.2)	6 (0.2)	5 (0.2)	6 (0.2)	14 (0.6)	29 (1.1)	51 (2.0)	43 (1.7)	24 (0.9)	13 (0.5)	11 (0.4)	7 (0.3)	213 (8.4)
Average precipitation days	8.4	6.9	6.1	5.2	4.4	6.7	8.3	7.2	6.1	8.2	10	8.3	85.8
Average relative humidity (%)	76	74	67	62	57	54	64	70	76	75	77	75	69
Source: climatebase.ru
