= Anna Czerwińska =

Polish mountaineer (1949–2023)

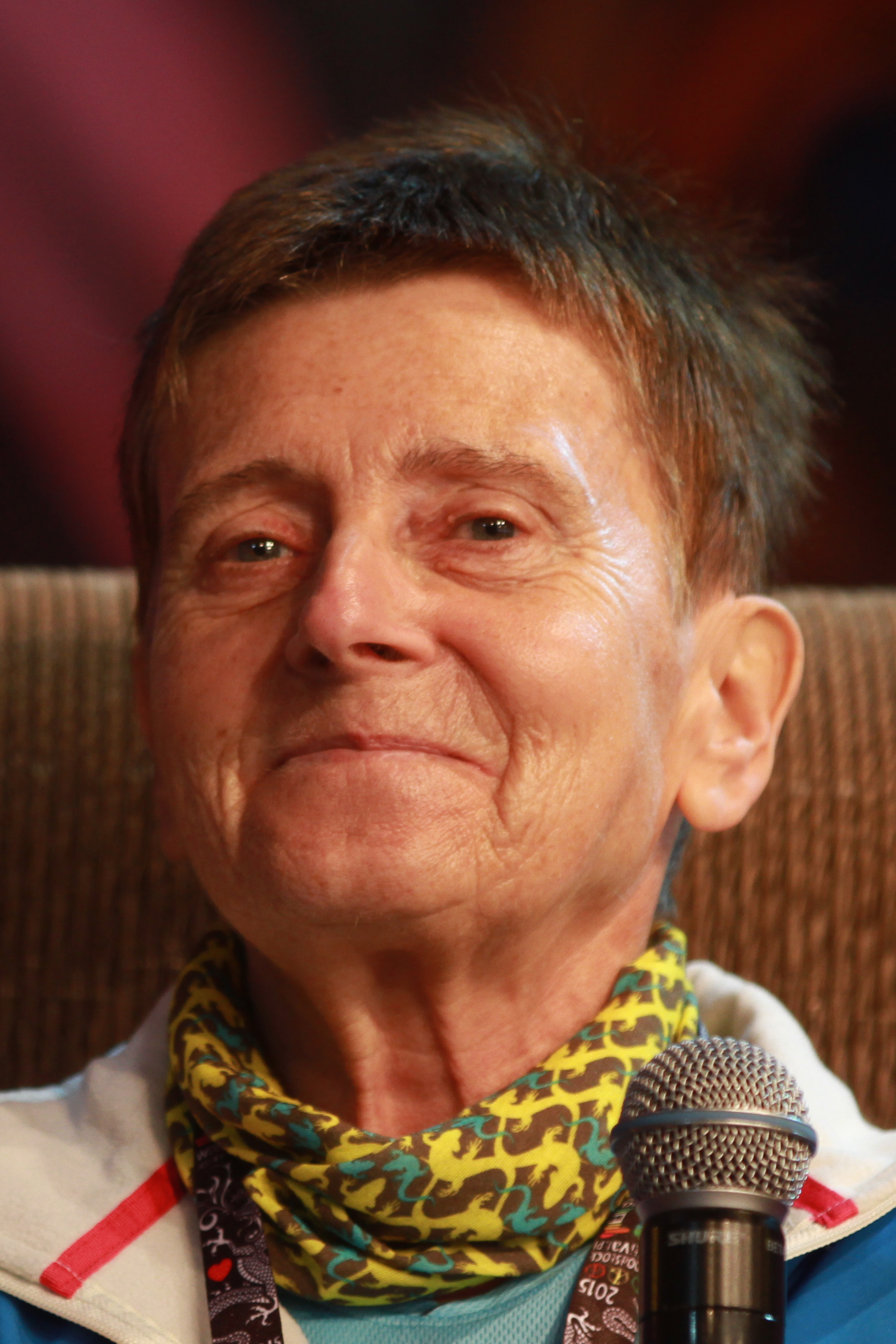
Czerwińska at the Polish Woodstock 2015

Anna Czerwińska (10 July 1949 – 31 January 2023) was a Polish climber. She is known for being the then-oldest woman to summit Mount Everest, doing so at the age of 50. She also published several books about mountaineering.

== Climbing career ==
Czerwińska was born in Warsaw, and was the first Polish woman to reach the Seven Summits. A pharmacist by education, she also used her knowledge to provide aid to people she encountered in the mountains.

Czerwińska was a member of a 1975 Polish Expedition, which marked International Women's Year. The expedition consisted of an all-woman team, as well as a men's team that served as support, with a mixed gender team marking the first ever ascent of Gasherbrum III. A serious leg injury, however, meant that she was unable to take part in the peak assault.

In March 1978, she climbed the north face of the Matterhorn with Krystyna Palmowska, Wanda Rutkiewicz, and Irena Kesa Czerwińska, marking the first all-female winter ascent of this route.

In 1979, Czerwińska climbed a new route, Rakaposhi (7788 m), in Pakistan with Krystyna Palmowska. On 30 June 1983 they both climbed Broad Peak, making the first women's ascent thereof.

Czerwińska took part in four K2 expeditions: in 1982, 1984, 1986, and 2010. It was in 1986 that she bore witness to tragedy when 13 climbers died on the mountain. On 15 July 1985, she was on the summit of Nanga Parbat with Wanda Rutkiewicz and Krystyna Palmowska, the first all-woman team to reach the top without the support of men.

Czerwińska led the Makalu Expedition in 1988 and was also a member of the Makalu Expedition in the winter of 1990. She likewise led an expedition to Kanchenjunga in 1990.

Over the course of five years, Czerwińska summited the highest peaks of all continents: Aconcagua (South America) and Kilimanjaro (Africa) in 1995, Denali (North America), Elbrus (Europe) and Mount Kosciuszko (Australia) in 1996, Mount Vinson (Antarctica) in 1998, Carstensz Pyramid (Australia with Oceania) in 1999, and Mount Everest (Asia) on 22 May 2000. She was, at the time, the oldest woman to summit Mount Everest and the second Pole (and first woman Pole) to have completed the seven summits.

On 6 June 2000, she reached the peak of Shishapangma. In 2001, Czerwińska summited Lhotse and Cho Oyu.

In addition to her mountaineering work, Czerwińska also authored or coauthored many books about climbing on Matterhorn, Gasherbrum, Broad Peak, Nanga Parbat, and K2.

== Notable mountains climbed ==
List of eight-thousander mountains climbed:

- 1983 - Broad Peak-Rocky Summit (not considered as independent eight-thousander)
- 1985 - Nanga Parbat
- 1986 - K2 (to an altitude of 8200 m)
- 2000 - Mount Everest
- 2000 - Shisha Pangma (Central-Peak)
- 2001 - Lhotse
- 2001 - Cho Oyu
- 2003 - Gasherbrum II
- 2006 - Makalu

== See also ==
- List of 20th-century summiters of Mount Everest
- List of Mount Everest records
