= Naila Kiani =

Pakistani mountaineer

Naila Kiani SI
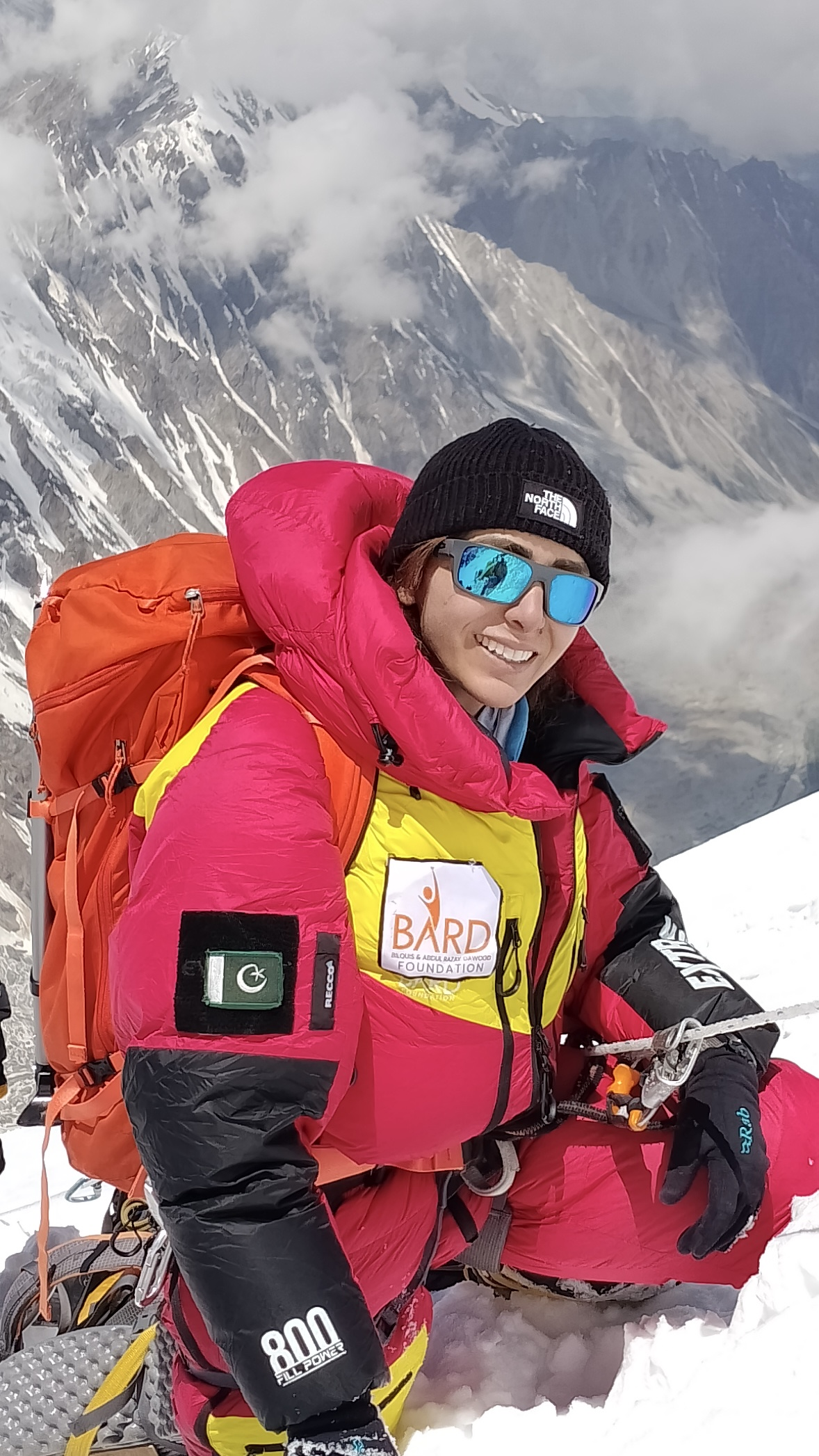

Personal information
- Native name: نائلہ کیانی
- Born: 10 November 1989 (age 36) Rawalpindi, Pakistan
- Education: Queen Mary University of London
- Occupation: Mountaineer

Climbing career
- Type of climber: Alpine climbing; Expedition climbing
- Updated on 21 April 2024

Naila Kiani (Urdu: نائلہ کیانی); is the leading Pakistani female high altitude and one of the world’s most accomplished female mountaineer. Kiani is the first Pakistani woman to climb 12 of the 14 eight-thousanders. She is one of the ten mountaineers worldwide and the only Pakistani who climbed multiple (7 peaks) above 8000m in less than six months. Kiani is also the fastest Pakistani (male or female) to climb all twelve 8,000-metre peaks in less than three years.

She has a degree in aerospace engineering from the School of Engineering and Materials Science at Queen Mary University of London, and has served as an Associate Vice President at HSBC bank. Along with being a mountaineer, she is also a competitive boxer.

Kiani has been appointed as the National goodwill ambassador for girls’ education by the Ministry of Federal Education. Kiani is a goodwill ambassador for several organisations supporting women's education and empowerment of youth through sports.

Kiani is the only female athlete to receive Sitara-i-Imtiaz, the highest civilian honour given to any athlete in Pakistan. Kiani was born on 10 November 1989 to a Kiani family in Rawalpindi.

== Career ==
In July 2021, Kiani became the first Pakistani female mountaineer to ascend the 8,035-metre Gasherbrum II — the world's 13th highest mountain. She was also the first Pakistani female to climb any of the 8,000-metre peaks in Pakistan.

Kiani became the second Pakistani woman to climb the 8,611-metre-high K2 — the 2nd highest mountain in the world in July 2022.

Kiani reached the peak of the 8,080-metre-high (26,510 ft) Gasherbrum I — the 11th highest mountain in the world in August 2022, the first Pakistani team to climb another mountain straight after K2.

In April 2023, Kiani became the first Pakistani woman to scale the 8,091-metre Annapurna — the world's 10th highest mountain located in Nepal.

Kiani became the second Pakistani woman to climb the 8,848-metre-high Mount Everest in May 2023. Later in May 2023, Kiani became the first Pakistani woman to successfully climb the 8,516-metre Mount Lhotse — the world's 4th highest peak. She was the first Pakistani climber Lhotse two days after climbing Everest.

In July 2023, Kiani became the first Pakistani woman to summit the 8,125-metre Nanga Parbat — the world's ninth-highest peak. Later in July 2023, Kiani became the first Pakistani woman to summit the 8,051-metre-tall (26,414 ft) Broad Peak — the world's 12th highest peak. Kiani became the first Pakistani woman to climb all five of Pakistan's eight-thousanders.

Kiani became the first Pakistani woman to climb 8,163-metre Manaslu peak in Nepal – the eighth-highest mountain in the world, in September 2023.

In October 2023, Kiani became the first Pakistani woman to summit the 8,188-metre Cho Oyu — the world's sixth-highest peak. Later in October 2023, Kiani and Sirbaz Khan called off their attempted ascent of Shishapangma peak in Tibet, after surviving an avalanche near its summit.

In May 2024, Kiani climbed the 8,485 metres tall Makalu – the world’s fifth-tallest mountain – in Nepal.

In May 2025, Kiani climbed the 8,586-meter-tall (28,169 ft) Kangchenjunga – the world’s third-tallest mountain – in Nepal.

== Awards and honours ==
In March 2024, the President of Pakistan conferred Sitara-i-Imtiaz to Kiani. Kiani is the only female athlete to receive Sitara-i-Imtiaz, the highest civilian honour given to any athlete in Pakistan.
