= Broad Peak Central =

Secondary peak of the Broad Peak, located in Pakistan and China

- Zhongyang; Broad Peak Mid Peak; Broad Peak Middle
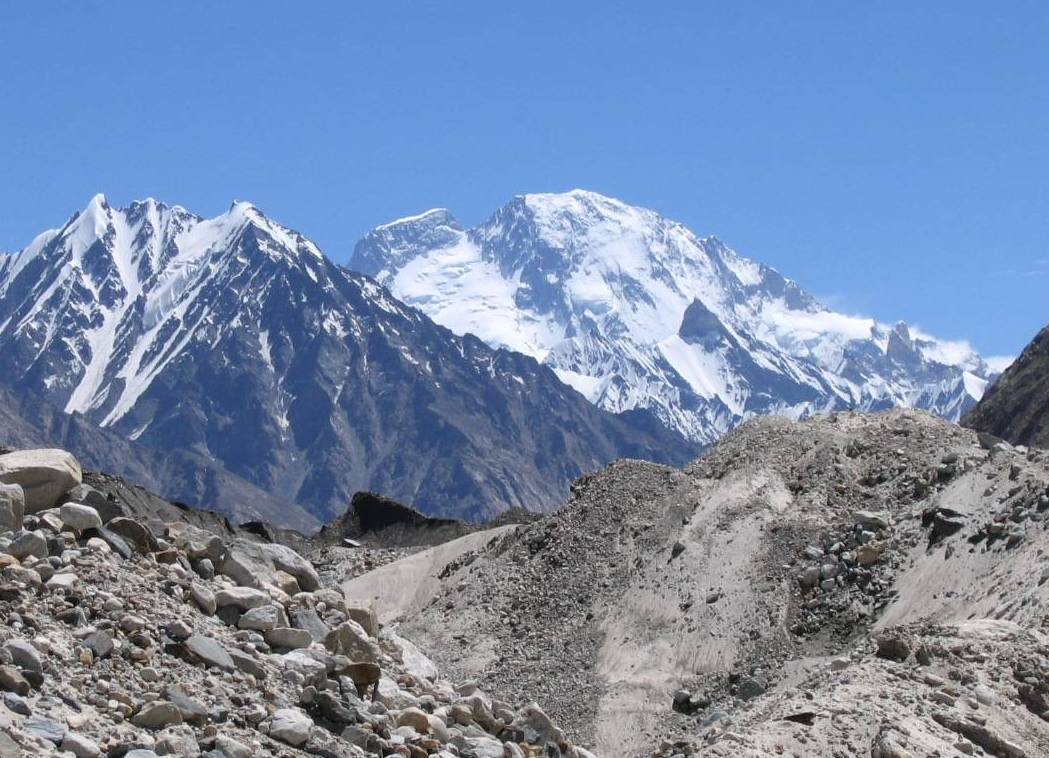
- Broad Peak in the background. Broad Peak Central on the left, the long ridge from the sub to the main summit on the right

Highest point
- Elevation: 8,016 m (26,299 ft)
- Prominence: 196 m (643 ft)
- Coordinates: 35°49′11″N 76°34′0″E

Geography
- Location within Karakoram Location within Gilgit Baltistan Location within Southern Xinjiang
- Location: Baltistan, Gilgit–Baltistan, Pakistan; Tashkurgan, Xinjiang, China, China–Pakistan border,
- Parent range: Karakoram

Climbing
- First ascent: 28.07.1975 Kazimierz Głazek, Janusz Kuliś, Marek Kęsicki, Andrzej Sikorski, Bohdan Nowaczyk
- Easiest route: snow/ice climb

Broad Peak Central is a secondary peak of the Broad Peak, which is also referred to as a relatively independent main peak.

It belongs to the Gasherbrum massif. Due to its visual independence, it was long disputed whether it was the 15th eight-thousander. The mountain lies in the disputed border region of Kashmir (Pakistan and India) and Xinjiang (China).

== First ascent ==
The first ascent was on 28 July 1975 by a Polish expedition. The six climbers Roman Bebak, Kazimierz Głazek, Marek Kęsicki, Janusz Kuliś, Bohdan Nowaczyk and Andrzej Sikorski began their summit attack from Camp III at an altitude of about 7200 m. Shortly before the summit, Bebak turned around so that a short time later five climbers reached the summit. Nowaczyk disappeared while descending in a snowstorm. The search of the other climbers was unsuccessful. Since they could not descend far due to the search, they had to bivouac near the summit. The search continued the next morning, but to no avail. During the further descent, Kęsicki, Kuliś and Sikorski slipped. Kęsicki and Sikorski died in the process. Thus, only two of the first climbers survived the expedition.

== First ascent of the east side ==
On 4 August 1992, a Spanish expedition made the first ascent of a route on the Chinese east side to Broad Peak Central (and thus the third ascent of this summit). After three failed attempts in July, Catalans Òscar Cadiach, Enric Dalmau, Lluis Ráfols and Italy's Alberto Soncini finally reached the summit, having previously bivouacked at almost 8000m. The group had already set off on a reconnaissance trip to the remote area last year; Kurt Diemberger, who first climbed Broad Peak, also took part in both trips and explored the area geographically. This ascent was not only the first on the east side of this mountain, but the first ascent of a mountain of the Gasherbrum massif from the east, from the Trans-Karakoram Tract belonging to China. It was not until 15 years later that a Swiss expedition made the second ascent from the Chinese side with the first ascent of the north face of Gasherbrum II.

== See also ==
- List of mountains in Pakistan
