= Shehroze Kashif =

Pakistani mountaineer (born 2002)

- شہروز کاشف
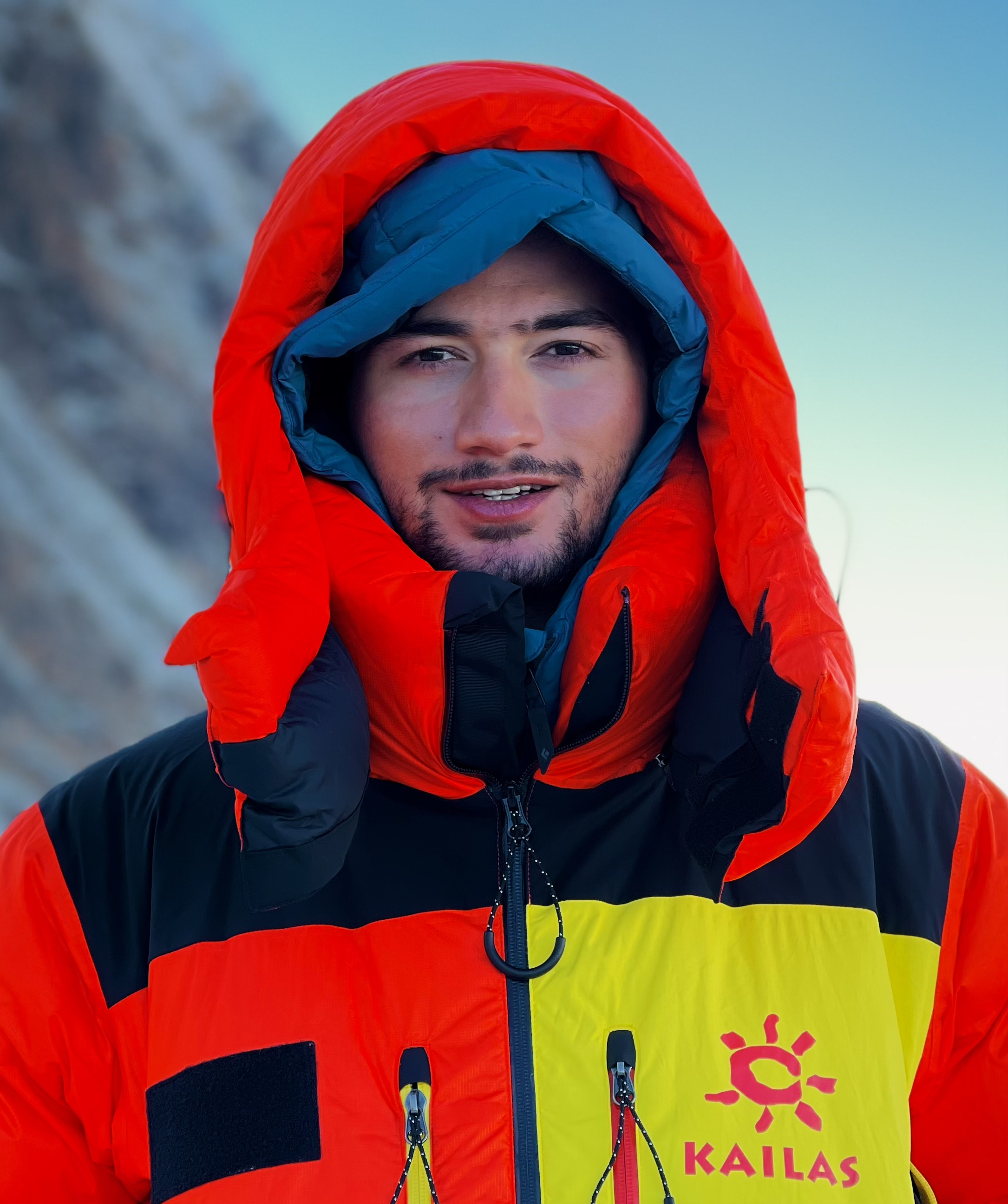
- Shehroze in 2021
- Born: 11 March 2002 (age 24); Lahore, Pakistan
- Occupation: Mountaineer
- Website: www.shehrozekashif.com

Shehroze Kashif (Urdu: شہروز کاشف; born 11 March 2002) is a Pakistani mountaineer who became the youngest climber ever to summit K2 on 27 July 2021. He became the youngest Pakistani to summit Mount Everest on 11 May 2021. After the successful summit of Mount Everest, Sports Board Punjab made him the youth ambassador of Punjab, Pakistan. He summited Broad Peak at the age of 17, after which he was called 'The Broad Boy'.

In October 2024, Kashif he became the youngest and only the second Pakistani, after Sirbaz Khan, to complete ascents of all fourteen eight-thousanders.

== Early years ==
He started climbing mountains at the age of 11, with the first one being Makra Peak, followed by Musa ka Musalla and Chembra Peak at age 12, Mingli Sar in Shimshal at age 13, Khurdopin Pass at age 15 and Khosar Gang in alpine style at 18 years of age.

== 2020s ==
On 5 May 2022, Kashif became the youngest in the world and the first Pakistani to reach the summit of Kangchenjunga - the third highest peak in the world. On 16 May 2022, Kashif summited the world's fourth-highest peak, Lhotse (8,516m), in Nepal. On 28 May 2022, Kashif and Sirbaz Khan summited 8,485 metres Makalu, the world's fifth-highest peak, in Nepal.

In July 2022, Kashif and Fazal Ali went missing between Camp 4 and Camp 3 while descending after successfully summiting Nanga Parbat. However, the duo was discovered shortly after.

On 1 November 2022, Kashif was recognised by Guinness World Records for the year 2023 for summiting Mount Everest and K2.

In February 2024, a documentary titled 'Above the Sleeping Giant' on Kashif and his journey was launched.

== Mountaineering expeditions ==
- Broad Peak 14 July 2019
- Mount Everest 11 May 2021
- K2 - 27 July 2021
- Manaslu - 25 September 2021
- Kangchenjunga - 5 May 2022
- Lhotse - 16 May 2022
- Makalu - 28 May 2022
- Nanga Parbat - 5 July 2022
- Gasherbrum II - 8 August 2022
- Gasherbrum I - 12 August 2022
- Annapurna - 16 April 2023
- Dhaulagiri - 17 May 2023
- Manaslu - 20 September 2023
- Cho Oyu - 6 October 2023
- Shishapangma - 9 October 2024
