= Sirbaz Khan =

Pakistani high-altitude mountaineer

Personal information
- Born: December 3, 1986 (age 39) Aliabad, Hunza Valley
- Occupation: Mountaineer

Climbing career
- Known for: 1st Pakistani to summit all 14 eight-thousanders.; 2nd person to complete the 3 summit project.; 1st Pakistani to summit Annapurna.; 1st Pakistan to summit Dhaulagiri.; 1st Pakistani to summit Lhotse.

Sirbaz Khan (born 3 December 1986) is a Pakistani high-altitude mountaineer. He is the first Pakistani to summit all 14 eighth-thousander peaks in the world.

== Early life ==
Sirbaz was born in Aliabad, Hunza Valley. His father was a carpenter and his first expedition was as an assistant cook for the base camp of K2 when he was in 9th grade.

== Career ==
He initially started his climbing career working as a kitchen boy and a porter for foreign climbers but in 2016 he was sponsored by the Nepalese climber Mingma Sherpa for an expedition to climb K2. Although the duo failed in their attempt but in October 2017 Sirbaz successfully summited Nanga Parbat becoming the first to climb the mountain in autumn season. In July 2018, Sirbaz climbed the 8,611-metre (28,251 ft) tall K2 — the second-tallest mountain in the world.

In May 2019, Sirbaz became the first Pakistani to successfully summit the 8,516-metre (27,940-foot) high Mount Lhotse – the world’s 4th highest mountain - without using supplementary oxygen.

In July 2019, Sirbaz climbed the summit of the 8,047-metre (26,401 ft) Broad Peak mountain in Pakistan, without using supplementary oxygen.

In September 2019, Sirbaz became the first Pakistani to scale Mount Manaslu, the world's 8th highest peak, in Nepal.

In April 2021, Sirbaz and Muhammad Abdul Joshi became the first Pakistanis to scale the 8,091 metre Annapurna peak in Nepal, the 10th highest mountain in the world.

In May 2021, Sirbaz reached the summit of the world's highest peak Mount Everest, in Nepal.

In July 2021, Sirbaz successfully climbed the 8,035-metre (26,362 ft) high Gasherbrum-II, the world's 13th-tallest peak.

In October 2021, Sirbaz climbed the 8,167-metre (26,795 ft) high Dhaulagiri mountain in Nepal.

In May 2022, Sirbaz climbed the world's 3rd-highest peak, Kanchenjunga, in Nepal. Later in May, Sirbaz summited the

8,481-metre (27,825 ft) high Mount Makalu in Nepal, the world's 5th highest peak.

In July 2022, Sirbaz climbed the 8,611-metre (28,251 ft) high K2 — the 2nd highest mountain in the world.

In August 2022, Sirbaz successfully climbed the 8,080-metre (26,510 ft) high Gasherbrum-I, the 11th highest mountain in the world.

In October 2023, Sirbaz summited the world’s sixth-highest peak, Cho Oyu (8,201 metres), in Tibet. Later in October 2023, Sirbaz Khan and Naila Kiani called off their attempted ascent of Shishapangma peak in Tibet, after surviving an avalanche near its summit.

In May 2024, Sirbaz reached the summit of the world's highest peak Mount Everest, in Nepal without using supplemental oxygen.

In September 2024, Sirbaz and Shehroze Kashif began their final ascent to Shishapangma the last of the world's 14 eight-thousander peaks and on 3 October, they successfully reached the summit making Sirbaz the first Pakistani to climb all 14 of the eight thousander mountains.

In May 2025, Sirbaz reached the summit of Kangchenjunga and became the first Pakistani to climb all 14 of the eight-thousanders without supplemental oxygen.

== Awards ==
- Pride of Pakistan (2022)
- Presidential Pride of Performance Award (2023)
- Nazir Sabir Mountaineering Award (2022)
