= Romolo Nottaris =

Swiss mountain climber and documentary filmmaker

Personal information
- Full name: Romolo Nottaris
- Nationality: Swiss
- Born: September 7, 1946 (age 79) Lugano, Switzerland

Climbing career
- Major ascents: Summits of Gasherbrum II and Makalu, alpine style

Romolo Nottaris (born July 9, 1946, in Lugano, Switzerland) is a Swiss rock climber, mountaineer and documentary filmmaker. He was the first Swiss to climb an eight-thousander in alpine style, without supplementary oxygen, sherpas or fixed ropes.

== Background ==
Nottaris was born in Lugano in 1946, the third of four children of a warehouse worker and housewife. His family loved the mountains and outdoors, and was introduced to the mountains at the age of six. At 14 he began guiding in the Alps, and later was a professional poker player in Geneva.

In the 1970s, Nottaris began collaborating with Radiotelevisione svizzera to create climbing documentaries. He would go on to make over twenty documentary films, covering expeditions to the Himalayas, Patagonia, Alaska and Antarctica.

In 1971 he was the only survivor of an avalanche on Mont Blanc, an experience which seriously affected him. He then turned to climbing in South America, making summits of Aconcagua, Chopicalqui and Huascaran.

In 1978, Nottaris organized the first expedition from Ticino to the Himalaya. He returned several times to the Himalayas, and in particular with Erhard Loretan and Jean Troillet. That year he would climb Pumori (7,161m).

Romolo Nottaris is an adherent of the "Alpine style" of mountaineering (i.e. climbing without high altitude porters, fixed ropes and oxygen masks). He would be the first Swiss climb an eight-thousander in alpine style, when he summited Gasherbrum II alongside Tiziano Zünd in 1981.

In 1984, he summited Makalu in alpine style.

Apart from the Himalayas, Nottaris has organized expeditions in Alaska, Patagonia, and Antarctica. In 2007, he led an expedition to the virgin peak, Mount Stanley in South Georgia.

In 2006, he was part of a rescue operation to find Swiss mountaineer Franco Dellatorre, who went missing while climbing in Patagonia.

In 2021, the camera was turned on the documentary filmmaker, as Nottaris filmed Walking on the Peaks/In cammino sulle creste, a thirteen episode documentary where he guided eight young people on a 140 km alpine trek. The series was later made available in new markets when it was picked up by Amazon Prime and Apple TV.

In 2024, he was part of another documentary series, Da Paese che vai alla Via Crio highlighting over twenty years of mountaineering public broadcasting.

== Main expeditions ==
Nottaris has completed the following expeditions:

- Aconcagua (6962 m), 1977
- Pumori (7161 m) 1978
- Makalu (8462 m), 1981
- Gasherbrum II (8035 m), 1981
- Makalu (8462 m), 1982 with Jean Troillet (Could not reach the summit because of bad weather)
- Mount McKinley (6194 m), 1982
- Mount Everest (8848 m), 1983 with Jean Troillet (Could not reach the summit because of bad weather)
- Makalu (8462 m), 1984
- Mount Epperly (4359 m), 1995 Antarctica with Erhard Loretan
- Pumori (7161 m), 2002 with Erhard Loretan
- Cerro Torre Cumbre (3128 m), 2006. Cumbre is a documentary film with Erhard Loretan
- Mount Vinson (4892 m) Antarctica
- Monte Sarmiento (2246 m) 2010

== Businesses ==
In 1978, he founded "New Rock", a trading company for mountain equipment. He was the first in Switzerland to secure the exclusive distribution of Scarpa mountain boots. His partnership with Scarpa turned into a collaboration, with Nottaris developing new designs for the company, including footwear for paragliding, and ski touring.

He would later go on to develop a new company, "Alpine Style" with his son Daniele. In 1993, he helped Scarpa develop the Denali ski and expedition boot. With the profits of this company, Nottaris financed his expeditions and sponsored other mountaineers like Ueli Steck and the Anthamatten brothers.

In 2023, Nottaris launched Uvarara, a wine company.

== Books ==
- Pumori: ticinesi in Himalaya del Nepal, Agno, 1980
- Fascino dell'Himalaya: Makalu 8478 m, 1 tentativo invernale: Gasherbrum 2 8035 m, Agno, 1981 (mit T. Zünd)
- Antartide: ancora una leggenda, ADV, 1993 (Text von Gianni Caverzasio, Fhoto von Romolo Nottaris)

== Filmography ==
- Cerro Torre Cumbre (Interview with Marco Pedrini, Film with Fulvio Mariani) 1986
- El Futre Mountain bike: Aconcagua (7035 m ) (Film with Fulvio Mariani) 1989
- White-Out (Mount Epperly with Erhard Loretan) 1996
- La danza della foca leopardo
- Tre passi nel regno del fantastico (with Gianluigi Quarti), 2005
- Romolo senza frontiere, 2012
- La magia del continente bianco (Film with Fulvio Mariani), 2013
- Romulus Nottaris, 2014
- Walking on the Peaks (Thirteen episode documentary)
