= Dominique Marchal =

Dominique G. Marchal
- Born: 1944 (age 81–82); Brussels
- Occupations: author, pilot, and mountaineer
- Known for: Buddhist nun

Dominique G. Marchal (born 1944) is a Belgian-born author, pilot and mountaineer who became a Buddhist nun at the age of 63.

== Biography ==
Marchal was born into a rich Roman Catholic family in Brussels in 1944. From her childhood on, she was something of a rebel, refusing to accept the family's way of life and the Catholic dogma. Keen to discover the world, she decided to become an aircraft pilot. She moved to Switzerland where she obtained her licence to fly on instruments in 1968, only to discover that she was the first woman in the country to receive her certificate. Always looking for adventure, she flew to Biafra in the late 1960s with arms for the rebels. She went on to work at transporting millionaires, including "one of the richest men in the world", in a Falcon 50, her favourite plane. In parallel, she raised two boys.

She became also increasingly disappointed with flying, especially when she started piloting Boeing 737 charters across Europe. As a result of increased automation, there was little contact with the passengers who became tantamount to freight. In the 1980s, she gave up her job as a pilot for a couple of months in order to accompany Jean Troillet in his expedition to Mount Everest, Jean Troillet's expedition. As the only non climber of the group she was able to reach a height of 5,150 m (16,900 ft). While being there, she meditated on the attractions of Buddhism.

In 1986, she finally gave up her work as a pilot and became a journalist. Three years later, at the "Prix de la Mémoire" in Paris, she saw the Dalai Lama in Paris. She decided to give up all the excitement and her marital problems (she had been through three unsuccessful marriages, two of which ended in divorce and one with the death of her third husband). She aspired to become a Buddhist nun, abandoning her make-up, shaving off her blond hair and taking on the humble orange-purple garb of the monks and nuns. In 1995, she moved to Kathmandu where, at the request of Shechen Rabjam Rinpoche and Matthieu Ricard, she started Shechen Clinic that she ran till 2007.

She officially received the status of a Buddhist nun in 2008, an achievement which was proudly welcomed by her two grown sons.

== Own publications ==
- Marchal, Dominique G. (2014). L'Envol du silence: Alpiniste, pilote d'avion, nonne bouddhiste... Les mille vies d'une femme d'exception (in French). Robert Laffont. ISBN 978-2-84111-597-6.
