= Troillet =

Troillet is a surname. Notable people with the surname include:

- Florent Troillet (born 1981), Swiss ski mountaineer
- Jean Troillet (born 1948), Swiss mountain guide
- Marie Troillet (born 1983), Swiss ski mountaineer, sister of Florent
