= Kronthaler =

Kronthaler is a German surname. Notable people with the surname include:

- Andreas Kronthaler (sport shooter) (1952–2025), Austrian sport shooter
- Andreas Kronthaler (fashion designer) (born 1966), Austrian creative director and design partner
- Markus Kronthaler (1967–2006), Austrian gendarme and mountaineer
