= Claudio Schranz =

Italian mountain guide and mountaineer

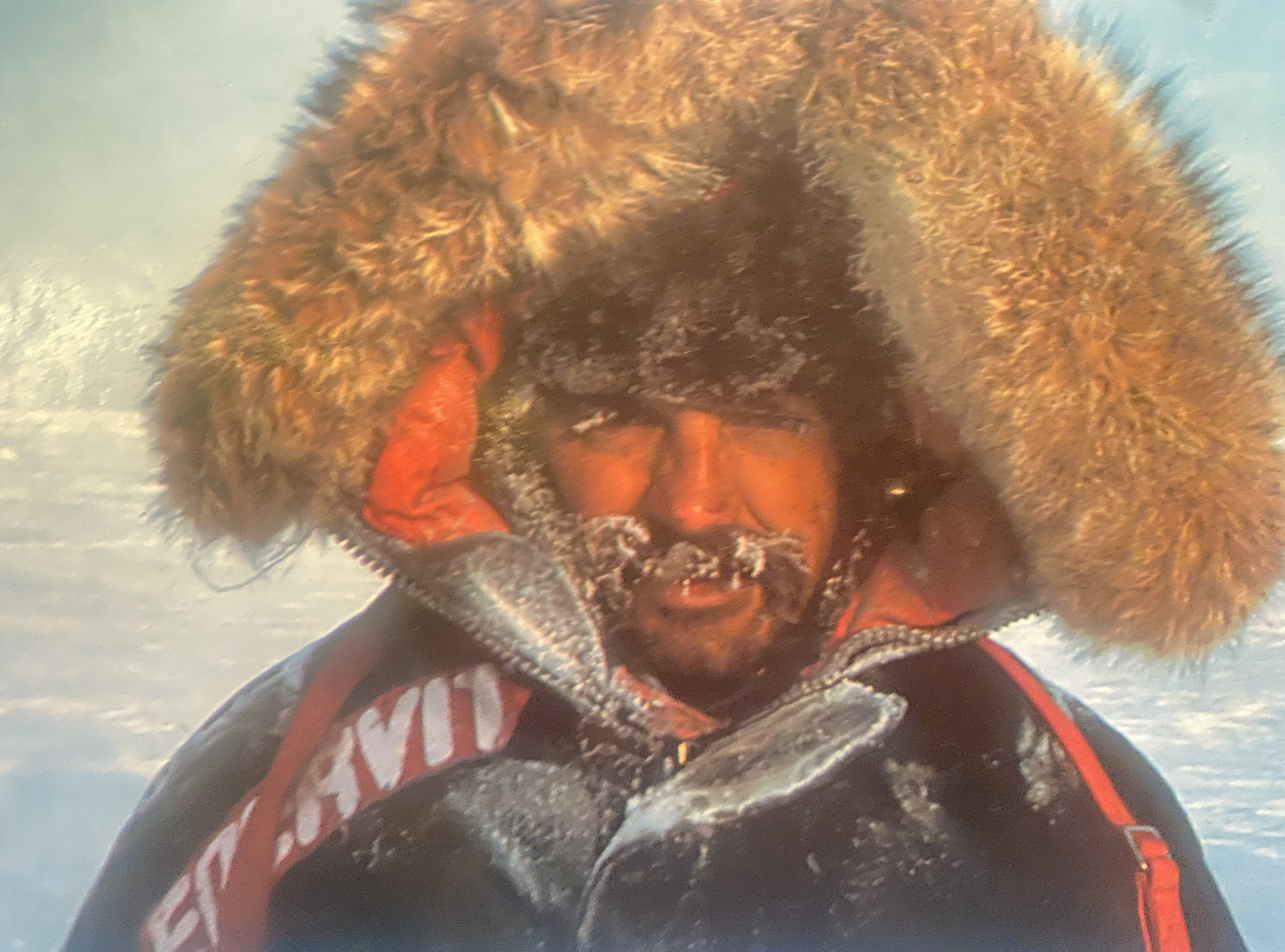
- Claudio Schranz

Personal information
- Born: 1949 (age 76–77) Macugnaga, Italy
- Occupations: Mountain guide; Mountaineer; skier

Climbing career
- Type of climber: Mountaineering
- Major ascents: Glacier Dome ascent, 1981; Aconcagua north face route, 1986; Broad Peak summit, 1988

Claudio Schranz (born 1949) is an Italian mountain guide, mountaineer and skier from Macugnaga, in the Monte Rosa area of the Alps.

He is registered with the regional association of mountain guides of Lombardy.

== Mountaineering career ==
=== Monte Rosa ===
Schranz's Alpine activity is closely connected with the Monte Rosa massif. Published sources on the mountaineering history of Monte Rosa mention, among his ascents, the Via CAI Macugnaga on the east face of Punta Zumstein, opened in 1976 with Marco Roncaglioni, and the Via Francesca Schranz, opened in 1991 with Marco Perini.

In 1977 he and Marco Roncaglioni opened a route on the Jägerhorn. The route was later discussed in specialist mountaineering media in connection with the attribution of its first ascent.

== Major climbs and expeditions ==
Year	Mountain / area	Activity
1976	Punta Zumstein, Monte Rosa	Opened the Via CAI Macugnaga with Marco Roncaglioni.
1977	Jägerhorn, Monte Rosa	Opened a route with Marco Roncaglioni.
1981	Glacier Dome, Himalaya	Reached the summit with Marco Roncaglioni, Gianfranco Tagliaferri and Gombu Sherpa.
1986	Aconcagua, Andes	Made a new route on the north face of the mountain.
1988	Broad Peak, Karakoram	Reached the summit on 1 August 1988.
1990	Mount Everest, Himalaya	Member of an Italian expedition on the Tibetan side of the mountain.

=== Himalaya and Karakoram ===
In 1981 Schranz took part in an Italian expedition to the Annapurna region. During the expedition, Claudio Schranz, Marco Roncaglioni, Gianfranco Tagliaferri and Gombu Sherpa reached the summit of Glacier Dome by the east ridge from the north side.

The ascent was also reported in other mountaineering publications, including The Himalayan Journal, Indian Mountaineer and the Alpenvereinsjahrbuch.

In 1988 he took part in an Italian expedition to Broad Peak in the Pakistani Karakoram. After the other members of the expedition turned back, Schranz reached the summit on 1 August 1988.

The expedition was also reported in publications of the Himalayan Club.

In 1990 he took part in an Italian expedition to Mount Everest from the Tibetan side, led by Oreste Forno. The team attempted the north face by the Great Couloir but did not reach the summit.

=== Aconcagua ===
In 1986 Schranz took part in an expedition to Aconcagua in the Argentine Andes. According to the American Alpine Journal, on 27 January 1986 he made a new route on the north face of the mountain, on the Polish Glacier side.

The ascent was also reported by The Alpine Journal, the journal of the British Alpine Club.

=== Mount Kenya ===
The Italian Alpine Club periodical Lo Scarpone documented a solo ascent by Schranz on Mount Kenya.

== Ski mountaineering ==
Mountaineering sources mention Schranz's ski descent of the route opened in 1977 on the Jägerhorn.

An article published by Skialper also mentions a descent of the Canalone Tuckett by Schranz in 1980.

== Exploratory expeditions ==
Schranz collaborated with Ambrogio Fogar during polar expeditions organized by the Italian explorer in the 1980s. During the North Pole expedition he provided technical support and maintained radio contact with the group travelling on the Arctic ice cap.

His involvement in Fogar's expeditions is also mentioned in Lorenzo Grossi's biography of Fogar.

== Mount Ararat ==
In the 1990s Schranz took part in expeditions to Mount Ararat in Turkey, in connection with explorations related to alleged remains traditionally associated with Noah's Ark.

His participation is described in Angelo Palego's book Come ho trovato l'Arca di Noè and in Francesco Sepioni's L'Arca di Noè tra mistero e realtà.

== Honours ==
Schranz was awarded the rank of Knight of the Order of Merit of the Italian Republic for sporting merit.
