= Hugo Ayaviri =

Bolivian mountain climber (born 1978)

- Born: December 21, 1978 (age 47); La Paz, Bolivia
- Occupations: Mountain climber and guide

Hugo Ayaviri (born December 21, 1978, in La Paz) is a Bolivian mountaineer. In 2021, he became the first Bolivian to summit Broad Peak and K2 without oxygen in ten days. He also climbed Nanga Parbat, Gasherbrum II and Gasherbrum I without oxygen in 2023.

== Biography ==
Ayaviri began instructing high-mountain rescue in 2008. The following year, he graduated as a high-mountain guide under the auspices of the Unión Internacional de Asociaciones de Guías de Montaña. In 2015, he was the general secretary of the Association of Mountain and Trekking Guides of Bolivia and the technical director of Socorro Andino Boliviano.

== Ascents ==
Ayaviri has specialized in rock and mountain ascents, climbing many of Bolivia's Cordillera Real and Cordillera Occidental ranges:

- 2008 Aconcagua
- 2011 Kilimanjaro, Mount Kenya and Mount Stanley
- 2013 Nevado Ojos del Salado, Cotopaxi, Cayambe, Iliniza Sur and Chimborazo
- 2014 Nevado Pan de Azúcar, El Cóncavo and Ritacuba Blanco
- 2015 Opened the southern face of Illimani
- 2016 Climbed Illampu and Illimani, opening a new route in the Tail of the Condor
- 2017 Socompa
- 2018 Llullaillaco, Quewar and Mont Blanc
- 2019 Wakana, Alto Toroni
- 2020 Llullaillaco, WaraWarani (central peak), Ventanani, Mullu Apacheta, Janqu Laya, Acotango and Capurata
- 2021 Broad Peak and K2
- 2023 Nanga Parbat, Gasherbrum II and Gasherbrum I

In 2021, together with Belgian climber Niels Jespers, he summited Broad Peak on July 18, followed by K2 on July 28, without oxygen in ten days; at the time, only eight persons had accomplished this feat without oxygen.
