= Erhard Loretan =

Swiss mountaineer (1959–2011)

- Born: April 28, 1959; Bulle, Switzerland
- Died: April 28, 2011 (aged 52); Grünhorn, Bernese Oberland, Switzerland
- Cause of death: Mountaineering accident
- Occupations: Mountaineer, alpine guide
- Known for: Third man to climb all 14 mountains over 8,000 metres, First traverse of Annapurna, in alpine-style, First ascent, solo, of Mt Epperly, Antarctica
- Notable work: Night Naked: A Climber's Autobiography, Himalaya
- Criminal charges: Manslaughter, for the accidental death of his son Ewan
- Children: 1, Ewan
- Honours: King Albert Medal of Merit, for distinguished contribution to mountaineering (1996)

Erhard Loretan (28 April 1959 – 28 April 2011) was a Swiss mountain climber. He was the third man to climb all fourteen peaks over 8,000 meters, and the second to do so without supplementary oxygen.

== Early life ==
Loretan was born in Bulle in the canton of Fribourg.

He climbed Dent de Broc, his first mountain at age 11 and made his first north face ascent at age 14. At 15, he climbed the east face of the Doldenhorn (3,643m) in the Bernese Alps. He trained as a cabinet maker (1979) and became a mountain guide in 1981.

== Climbing career ==
Loretan was the third person to climb all 14 eight-thousanders (second without oxygen). He made his first expedition to the Andes in 1980 and began climbing the eight-thousanders in 1982 with an ascent of Nanga Parbat.

Thirteen years later, in 1995, he climbed the last of them, Kangchenjunga. Loretan took the principles of climbing fast and light in the Alps and applied them to the biggest mountains on Earth.

In 1983, he climbed Gasherbrum II, Gasherbrum I and Broad Peak in alpine style, making the ascents in sequence across 17 days.

In 1984, he did a first ascent of Annapurna (8091m) by the 7km long east ridge with Norbert Joos and descended via the north side, a traverse that has never been repeated. That winter, he made the first winter ascent of Dhaulagiri.

In 1986, together with Jean Troillet, Loretan made a revolutionary ascent of Mount Everest in only 40 hours, climbing by night and without the use of supplementary oxygen. That winter he completed the "imperial crown" in the Valais Alps, summitting 38 peaks in 19 days.

In 1988, he completed a new route with Voytek Kurtyka on the Nameless Tower (6239m), Trango Towers, Pakistan. He continued to climb in the Alps, completing 13 peaks in 13 days across the Bernese Oberland in 1989.

In 1990 he climbed Denali (6,194m), Cho Oyu (8,201m) and Shishapangma (8,046).

In 1994, he made a solo first ascent of Mount Epperly (4508m) in Antarctica’s Sentinel Range. While making the ascent, he noticed a nameless peak, c4800m, steeper and more difficult than Epperly. In autumn 1995, after climbing Kangchenjunga (his 14th eight-thousander), Loretan returned to Antarctica and made a first solo ascent of this peak, which has been named Peak Loretan.

In 2002, he made a first ascent of Pumori's North Ridge, from the Tibetan side.

== Personal life ==
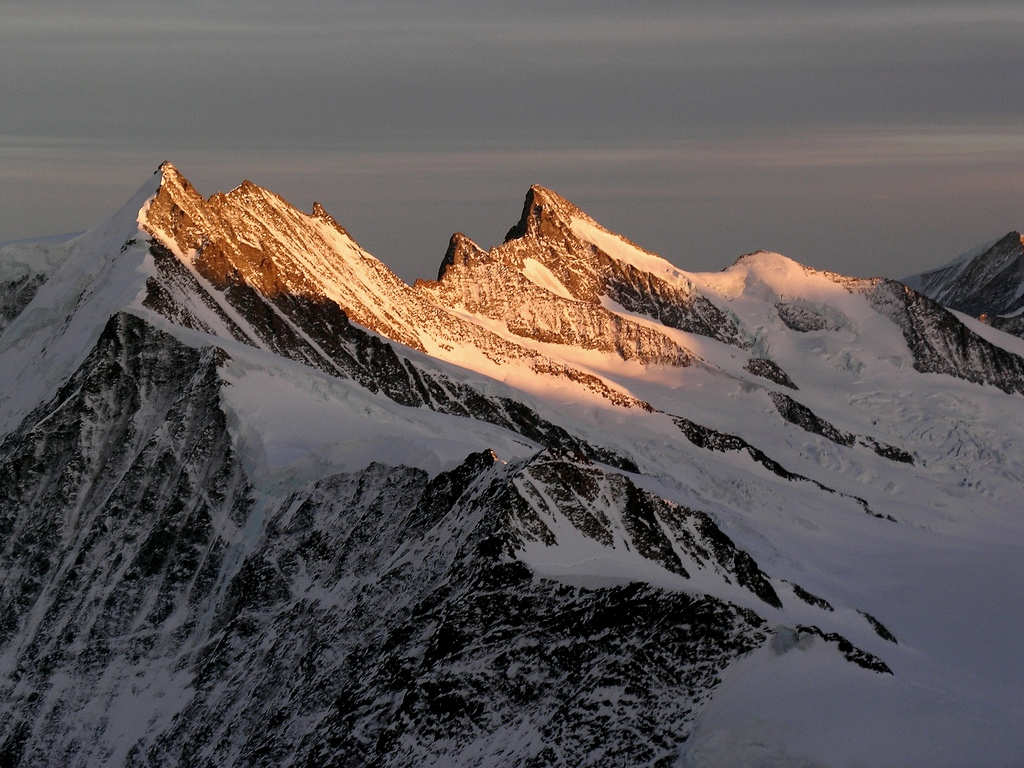
The Fiescherhorn and Grünhorn in the Alps

Loretan was convicted in 2003 of the manslaughter of his seven-month-old son, after shaking him for a short period of time to stop him crying in late 2001. He was given a four-month suspended sentence. At that time, shaken baby syndrome was largely unknown, but he decided to disclose his name to the press in the hope that other parents might avoid a similar tragedy. Publicity of the case raised awareness of the danger of shaking children due to their weak neck muscles.

=== Death ===
In April 2011, Loretan and his partner Xenia Minder were climbing the Grünhorn in the Swiss Alps when Minder slipped. The rope tying them together dragged them both down 200m. Minder was airlifted to hospital with serious injuries, but Loretan did not survive. He died on his 52nd birthday.

== Climbing history ==
| Peak | Year |
|---|---|
| Nanga Parbat | 1982 |
| Gasherbrum II | 1983 |
| Gasherbrum I | 1983 |
| Broad Peak | 1983 |
| Manaslu | 1984 |
| Annapurna | 1984 |
| K2 | 1985 |
| Dhaulagiri | 1985 |
| Mount Everest | 1986 |
| Cho Oyu | 1990 |
| Shisha Pangma | 1990 |
| Makalu | 1991 |
| Lhotse | 1994 |
| Kangchenjunga | 1995 |

== See also ==
- List of 20th-century summiters of Mount Everest
