= Krystyna Palmowska =

Polish mountaineer (1948–2025)

Personal information
- Nationality: Polish
- Born: 11 November 1948 Warsaw, Poland
- Died: 15 June 2025 (aged 76) Wyżnia Przybylińska Pass, High Tatras, Slovakia
- Occupations: Mountaineer; engineer

Climbing career
- Major ascents: 1977: Second all-female ascent of Matterhorn's North Face (with Anna Czerwińska); 1978: First successful all-female winter climb of Matterhorn (with Wanda Rutkiewicz, Anna Czerwińska, Irena Kesa); 1979: First women's ascent of Rakaposhi (7,788m), new route (with Anna Czerwińska); 1983: First woman to summit Broad Peak (8,051m) (alpine style); 1985: First all-female ascent of Nanga Parbat (8,126m); 1986: Reached 8,200m on K2's Magic Line (with Anna Czerwińska)
- Known for: First woman to summit Broad Peak first all-female summit of Nanga Parbat

Krystyna Palmowska (11 November 1948 – 15 June 2025) was a Polish alpinist, high-altitude mountaineer and engineer. Palmowska became known for her mountaineering expeditions in the late 1970s and 1980s, where she was recognized as one of Poland's most notable female climbers of her generation. In 1983, Palmowska was the first woman to summit Broad Peak and two years later was part of the first all-female summit of Nanga Parbat.

== Biography ==
Palmowska was born in Warsaw on 11 November 1948. Palmowska joined the Warsaw Mountaineering Club in 1969. There, she began to climb regularly with all-women's climbing teams, gaining experience in the High Tatras. After meeting climbing partner Anna Czerwińska, the pair would become known for their ascents of some of the Tatras' most difficult routes, including winter ascents.

=== International climbing expeditions ===
Palmowska made her first expedition to the Karakoram in 1975. That year, she reached 8035 m high on Gasherbrum II. before aborting the summit attempt.

In 1977, Czerwińska and Palmowska made the second all-female ascent of the Matterhorn's North Face. The following year, Palmowska was part of the first successful all-female winter climb of the Matterhorn.

In 1979 Palmowska and Czerwińska made a new ascent of Rakaposhi (7,788m). It was the first women's ascent of the mountain. In 1980, she was part of an expedition to Kanchenjunga.

In 1982, Palmowska was a member of the K2 Women's Expedition with Wanda Rutkiewicz and Czerwińska. Palmowska reached 7,000 m on the Abruzzi Rib before descending. The following year, she summitted her first eight thousander, Broad Peak, in an alpine style ascent, becoming the first woman to reach the summit on 30 July 1983.

In 1985, she was part of the first all-female expedition team to summit Nanga Parbat (8,126m). In 1986, Czerwińska and Palmowska reached 8,200m up K2's Magic Line route, before descending.

Outside of mountaineering, Palmowska had a PhD in electrical engineering and worked as an engineer. In 2003, Palmowska published "Zaklęty w górski kamień" (Enchanted in the Mountain Stone), a book about climbing, friendship and her passion for the mountains.

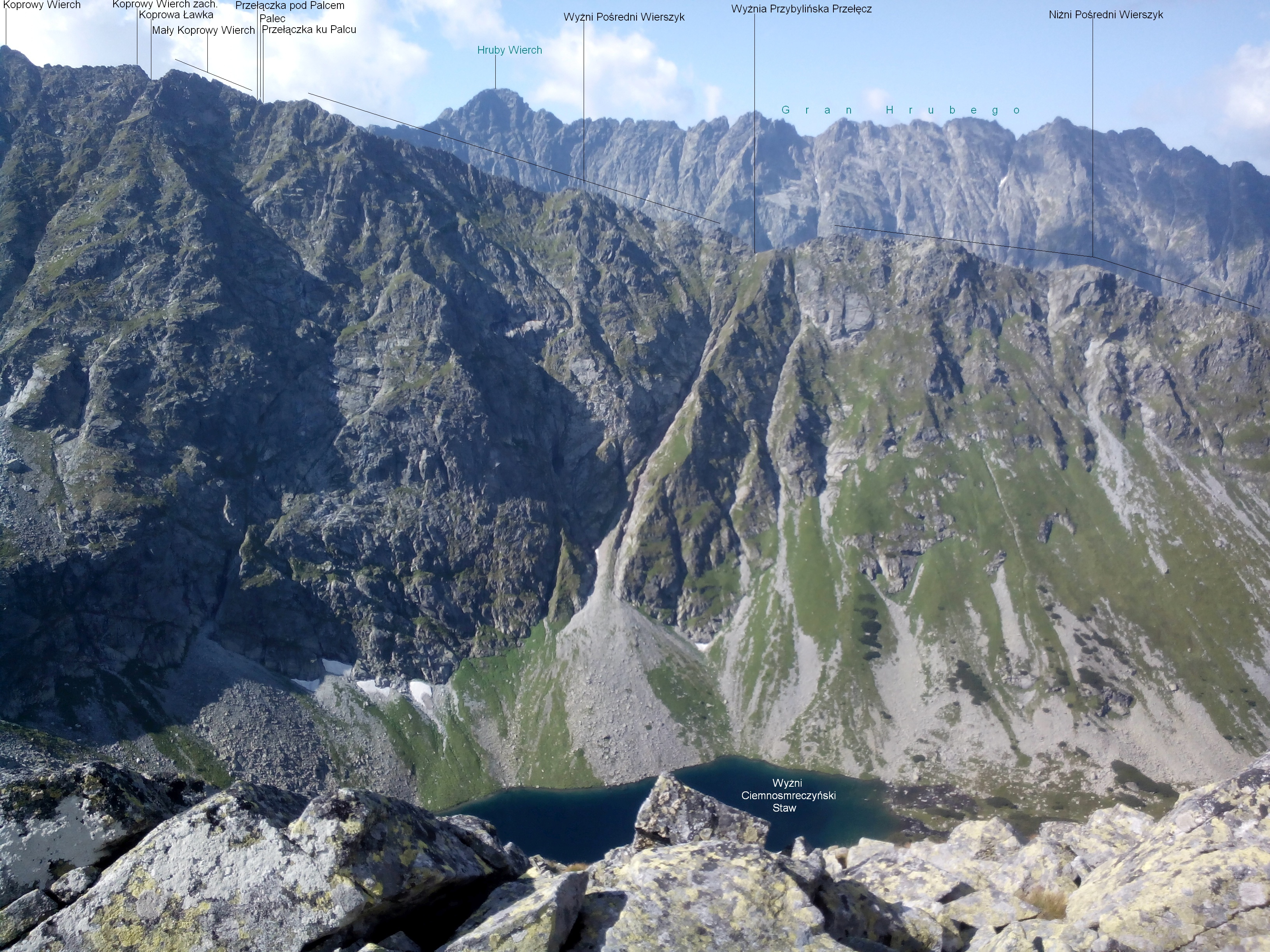
View of the Wyżnia Przybylińska Pass

=== Death ===
Palmowska died on 15 June 2025 at the Wyżnia Przybylińska Pass in the High Tatras in Slovakia. Her body was found a day later, in the area of the Piarżysta Valley near Koprowy Wierch. She was 76 years old.
