= Gasherbrum VI =

Mountain in Gilgit-Baltistan, Pakistan

Gasherbrum VI گاشربرم - 6
- Chochordin Peak
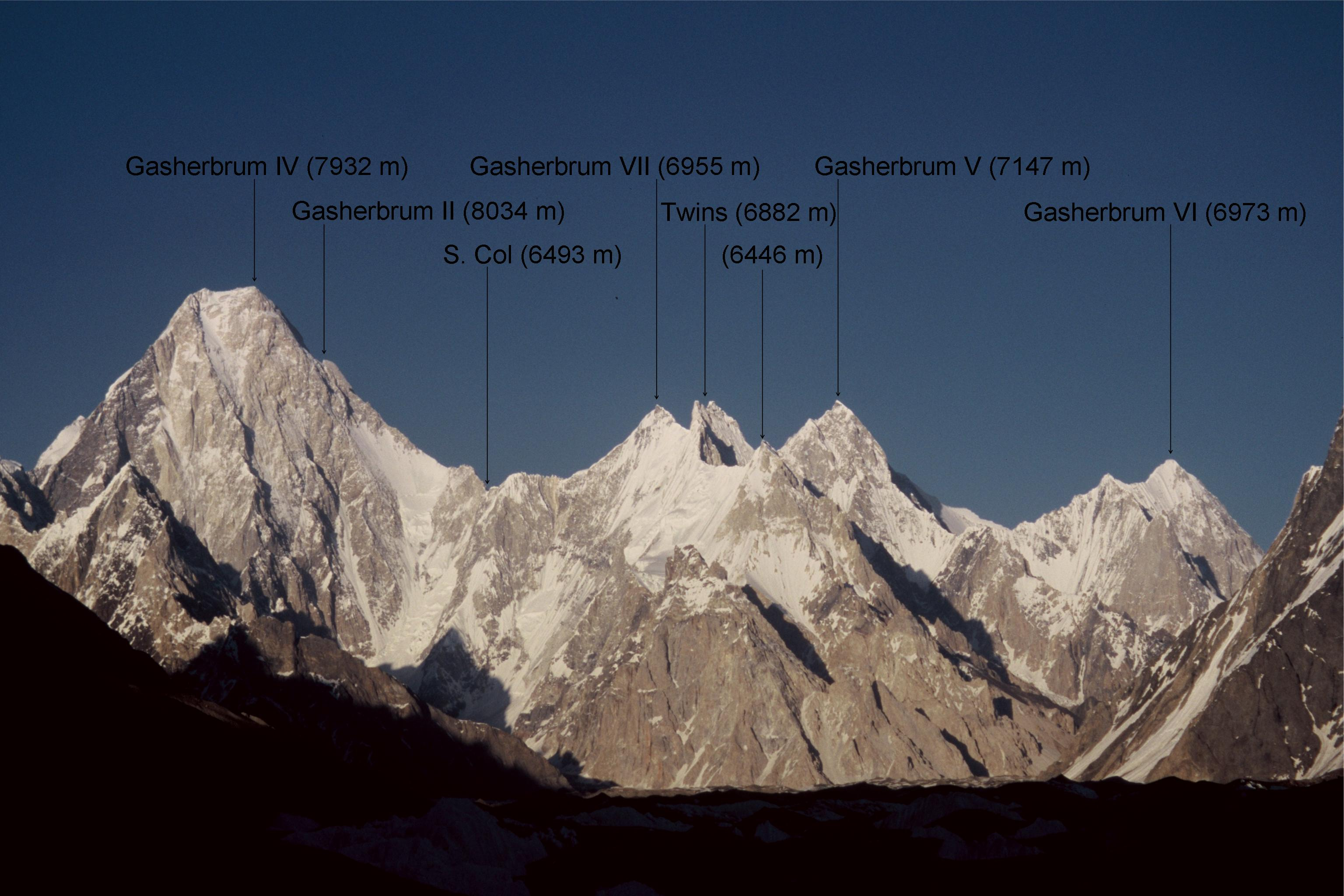
- West faces of Gasherbrum massif, VI is at right

Highest point
- Elevation: 6,979 m (22,897 ft)
- Prominence: 549 m (1,801 ft)
- Coordinates: 35°42′31″N 76°37′53″E

Geography
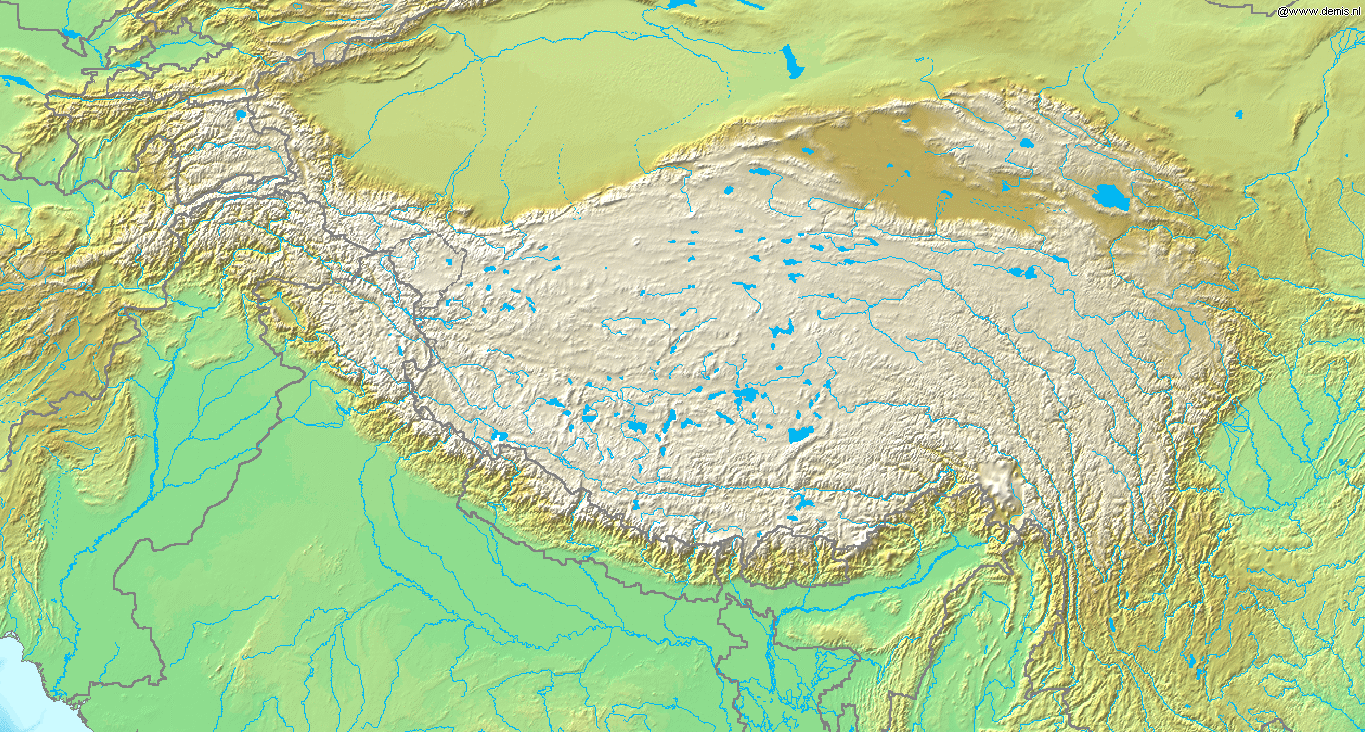
- Location within Tibetan Plateau
- Location: Gilgit–Baltistan (Pakistan)
- Parent range: Karakoram, Gasherbrum

Gasherbrum VI (Urdu: گاشر برم ۔ ۶), also known as Chochordin Peak, is a 6979m mountain in the Gasherbrum massif, located in the Karakoram range of Gilgit–Baltistan, Pakistan. Gasherbrum VI lies on a ridge south of the main crest. This ridge leads west to Gasherbrum V and then north to Gasherbrum IV. The mountain is considered unclimbed.
