= Aidin Bozorgi =

Iranian mountain climber

- آیدین بزرگی
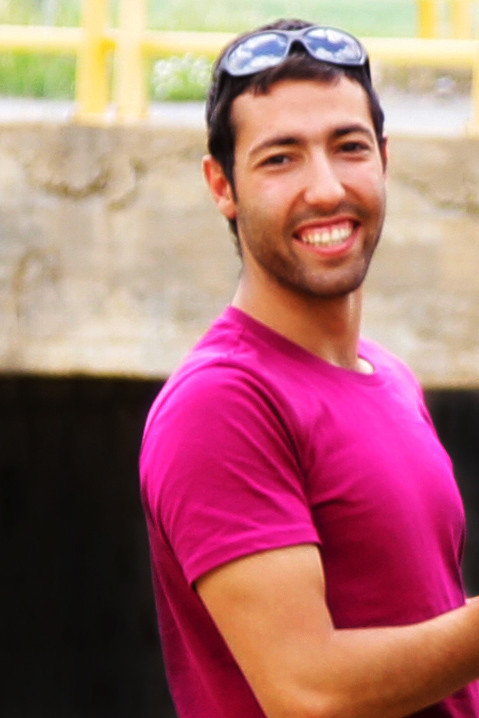
- Born: April 11, 1989; Tehran, Iran
- Disappeared: July 20, 2013 (aged 24); Broad Peak, Pakistan
- Status: Missing for 13 years, 3 months and 20 days
- Education: Bachelor of Electrical Engineering
- Occupation: Mountaineering Ice climbing Rock climbing Big wall climbing Student Electrical Engineering

Aidin Bozorgi (Persian: آیدین بزرگی; 1989– disappeared July 20, 2013 in Broad Peak, Pakistan) was an Iranian mountain climber. He was 13 years old when he started mountaineering. Soon, he had shown how talented he was by climbing Mount Damavand when he was only 15 years old. Bozorgi was good at most mountain-relating climbing sports such as ice climbing, mixed climbing, rock climbing, sport climbing, big wall climbing, traditional climbing, aid climbing and bouldering.

== Biography ==
Bozorgi had grown up in Tehran, Iran. His achievements were in variety of fields like painting, kung-fu and mountaineering. Hasan Najjarian was his motivator into the world of mountaineering. Being his trainee for couple of years, he was accepted in K.N.Toosi University of Technology and continued his mountaineering life with the university mountaineering group. In order to be a professional mountaineer, he joined Arash alpine club in 2007.

Bozorgi got third place in Khwarizmi competition 2005. He was educated in Tehran, receiving a bachelor's degree in electrical engineering at K.N.Toosi University of Technology 2013. He was ranked 5th in 18th national Economics Olympiad. He also ranked 11th in the national master's degree exam in Economics 2013.

== Setting Iran route ==
Bozorgi (with Pouya Keivan and Mojtaba Jarahi) successfully completed a new route on the Southwest Face of Broad Peak they had been working on since 2009. The descent proved to be more complicated than expected. Climber Thomas Laemmle, who helped with the unsuccessful search and rescue attempt, stated that he believed Bozorgi and his companions were dead, and the search operation on Broad Peak was formally called off. They have been presumed dead.

== Climbed mountaineering routes ==
=== 2008 ===
- Chalun (4550m), (winter ascends), Arash club team
- Siah Sangha (4604m), (winter ascends), Arash club team
- Siah Kaman (4472m), (winter ascends), Arash club team

=== 2009 ===
- Shah Alborz (4170m), (winter ascends)

==== 2009/11 ====
- Broad Peak (8051m), Iran route, 2 attempts, Arash club team

==== 2009/10/11 ====
- 6 ascends on Sabalan (4811m), north face glacier

=== 2010 ===
- Damavand (5610m), north ridge (winter ascend)
- Harze Kuh divide (autumn ascends)
- Dena divide (autumn ascends)
- Sabalan ranges, Kasra peak (4420m), west glacier

==== 2010/11 ====
- Damavand (5610m), south ridge (winter ascends)
- Kolun Bastak to Sarakchal divide (winter ascends)
- Damavand (5610m), Yakhar glacier
- Damavand (5610m), Sioole glacier

=== 2011/13 ===
- Azad Kuh (4395m), (winter ascends)

=== 2012 ===
- Damavand (5610m), Daagh ridge (winter ascend)
- Zard Kuh divide
- Sabalan ranges, Heram II peak (4450m), west glacier

=== 2013 ===
- Divide of Pasande Kuh to north Khersan (1st winter ascend), with Pouya Keivan
- Broad Peak (8051m), Iran route, 1st ascend, without supplemental oxygen, Arash club team

== Climbed big wall climbing routes ==
=== Alam-Kuh (4850m) ===
==== 2010 ====
- Polish 1973 route (52 Lahestaniha)
- German's arête (Gorde Almanha)

==== 2012 ====
- Arash (Solo climbing)
- Karajiha-Polish 1969 (48 Lahestaniha)

=== Bisotun ===
==== 2010 ====
- Gharargah

==== 2011 ====
- Harry Rost

==== 2013 ====
- Jashnvare (Route setter)

=== Pol-e Khvab ===
- Roja
- Negar (2 pitches)
- NTM (3 pitches)
- Chakosh (3 pitches)
- Marmoolak
- Gigilikh
- Omid
- Brono
- Sisakht (2 pitches)
- Arezu (3 pitches)
- Flash Tank
- Shirin
- Doustet Daram
- H
- Abroftiha (2 pitches)
- Kolahak Salaam
- Darz-e shirin
- Zire Baran
- Parastu

== Caving ==
- Paroo
- Ghalay Chay
- Namaki

== See also ==
- List of people who disappeared mysteriously: post-1970
