= Gasherbrum =

Mountain range in Pakistan and China

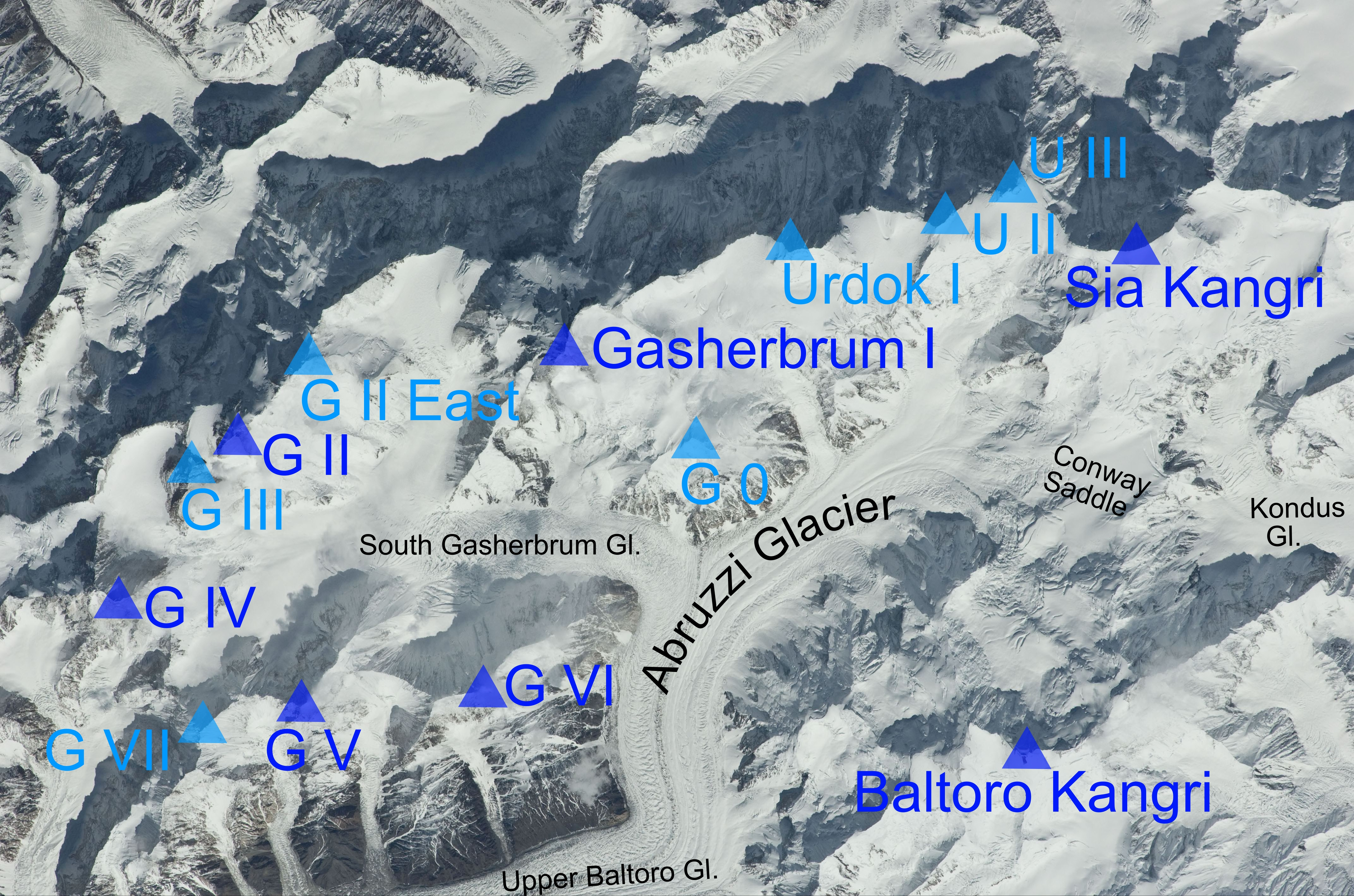
- Gasherbrum group as seen from the ISS

Highest point
- Peak: Gasherbrum I
- Elevation: 8,080 metres (26,510 ft)
- Coordinates: 35°43′N 76°42′E

Geography
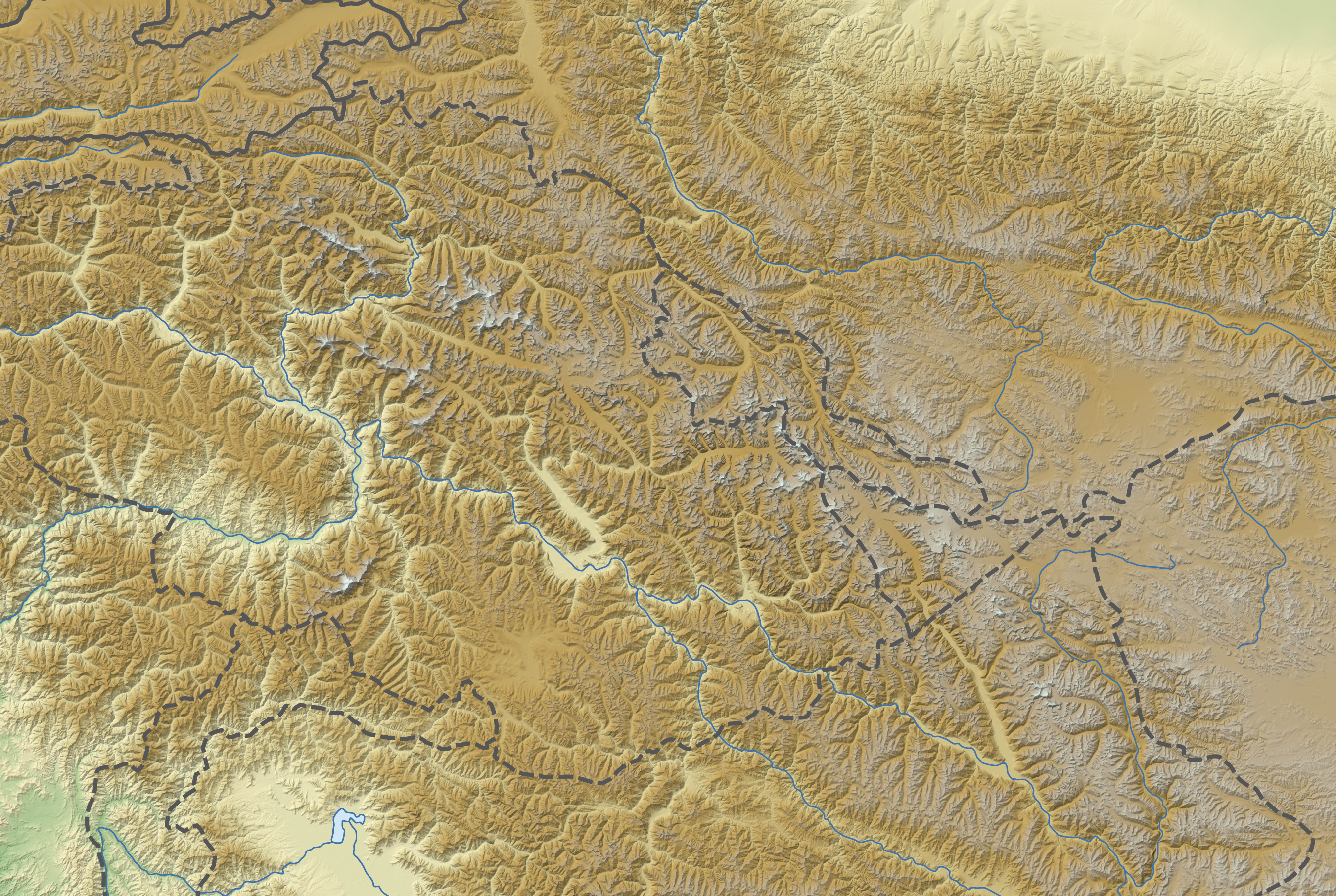
- Location within Karakoram Location within Gilgit Baltistan Location within Southern Xinjiang
- Countries: Pakistan; China
- Regions: Gilgit-Baltistan; Xinjiang
- Parent range: Karakoram

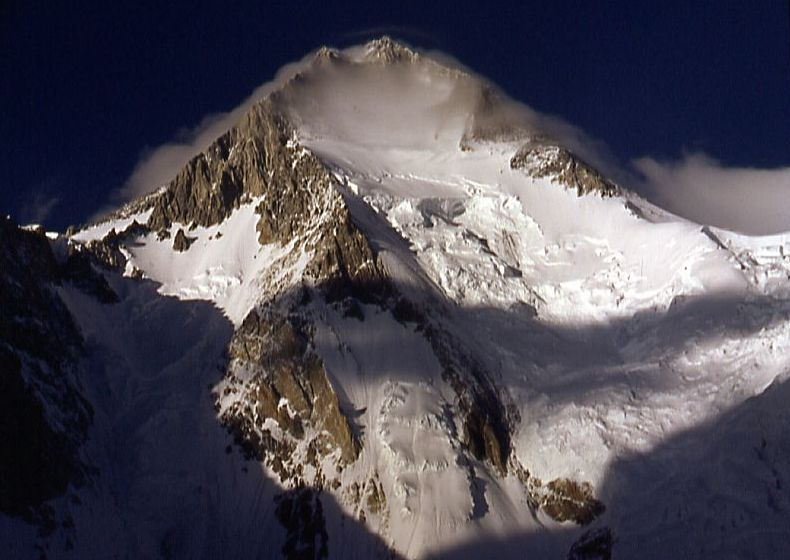
Gasherbrum I, 11th highest in the world

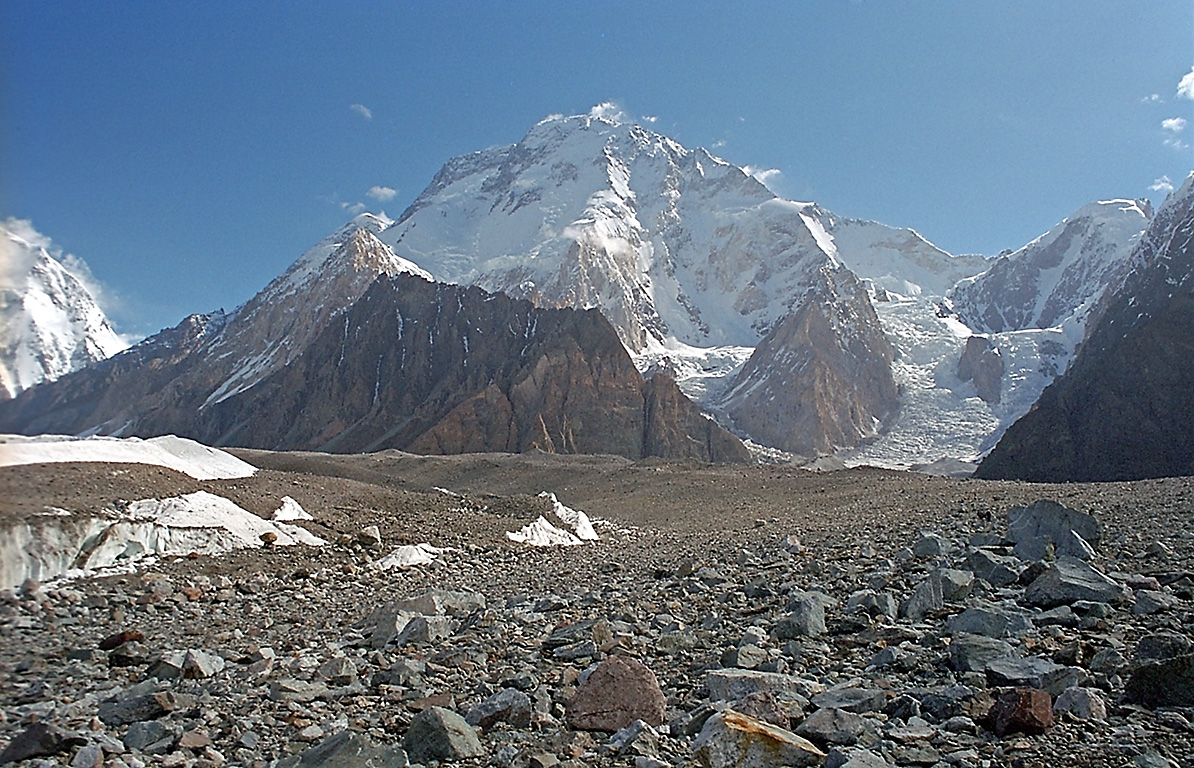
Broad Peak, 12th highest in the world

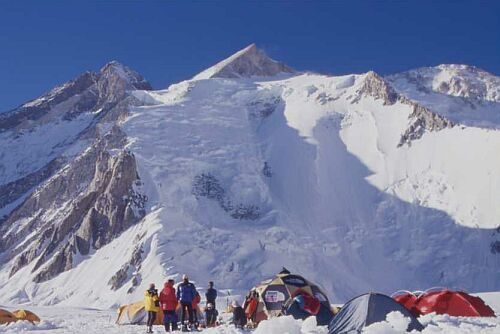
Gasherbrum II, 13th highest in the world

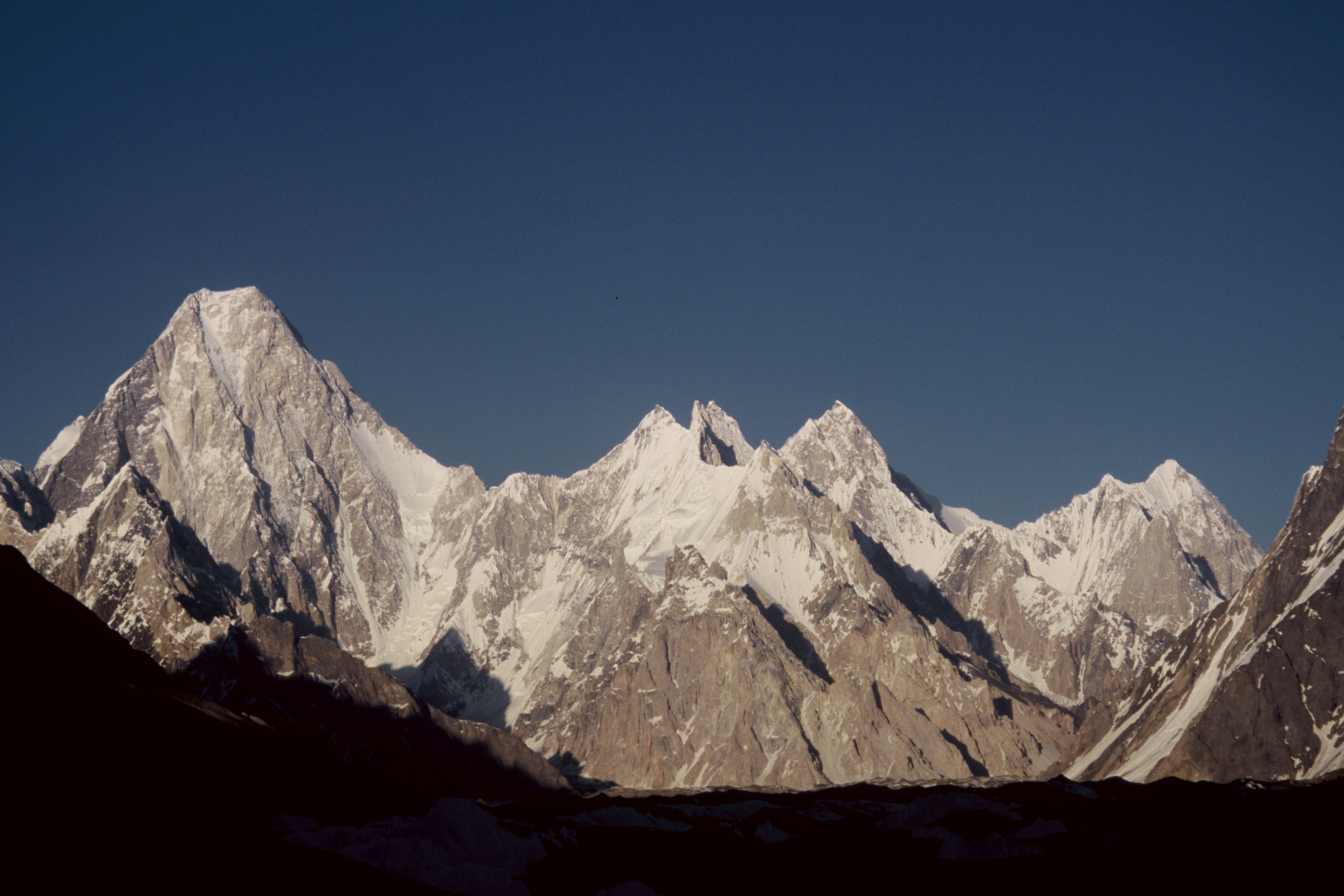
Gasherbrum Group with Gasherbrum IV, Gasherbrum V, and Gasherbrum VI

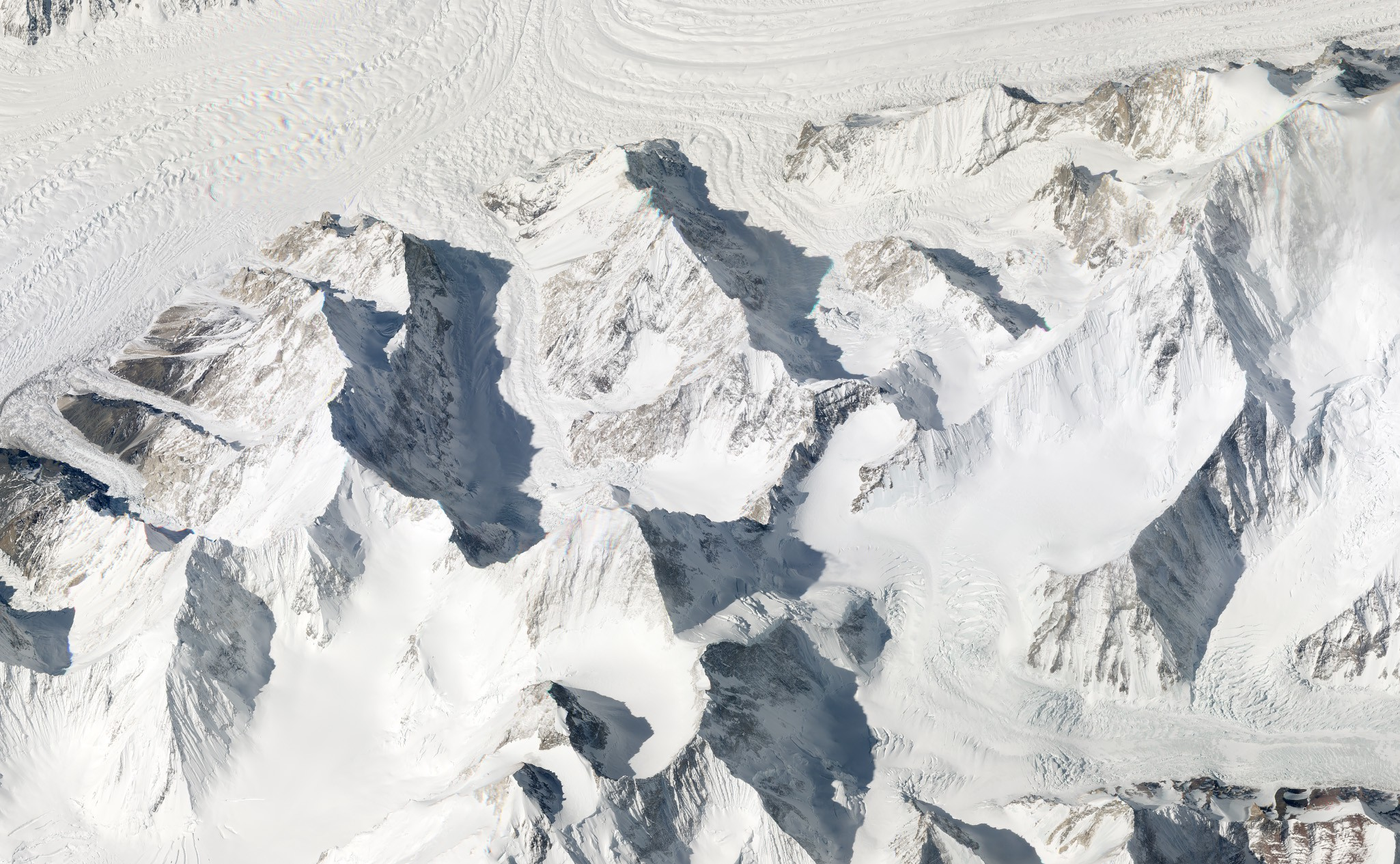
Satellite image of the Gasherbrum massif

Gasherbrum (Urdu: گاشر برم) is a remote group of peaks situated at the northeastern end of the Baltoro Glacier in the Karakoram mountain range. The peaks are located within the border region of Gilgit-Baltistan, Pakistan and Xinjiang, China. The massif contains three of the world's 8,000 metre peaks (if Broad Peak is included). The highly visible face of Gasherbrum IV has gained the nickname the "Shining Wall" and this has often been claimed as the meaning of the word "Gasherbrum". However the name Gasherbrum comes from "rgasha" (beautiful) + "brum" (mountain) in Balti, hence it actually means "beautiful mountain".

== Geography ==
The Gasherbrum range forms the continental divide of southern Asia; drainage to the north and east flows into the Tarim Basin, drainage to the south and west flows into the Arabian Sea.

Peak	Elevation	Prominence (m)	Latitude (N)	Longitude (E)
Gasherbrum I	8,080 metres (26,509 ft)	2,155	35°43′27″	76°41′48″
Broad Peak	8,047 metres (26,401 ft)	1,701	35°48′35″	76°34′06″
Gasherbrum II	8,035 metres (26,362 ft)	1,523	35°45′27″	76°39′15″
Gasherbrum III	7,952 metres (26,089 ft)	355	35°45′34″	76°38′31″
Gasherbrum IV	7,925 metres (26,001 ft)	725	35°45′39″	76°37′00″
Gasherbrum V	7,147 metres (23,448 ft)	654	35°43′45″	76°36′48″
Gasherbrum VI	6,979 metres (22,897 ft)	520	35°42′30″	76°37′54″
Gasherbrum VII	6,955 metres (22,818 ft)	165	39°44'19"	76°36'0"
Gasherbrum Twins	6,912 metres (22,677 ft) and 6,877 metres (22,562 ft)	162	35°34'13"	76°35'36"

== History ==
In 1856, Thomas George Montgomerie, a British Royal Engineers lieutenant and a member of the Great Trigonometric Survey of India, sighted a group of high peaks in the Karakoram from atop Mount Haramukh, more than 200 km away. He named five of these peaks K1, K2, K3, K4 and K5, where the "K" denotes Karakoram. Today, K1 is known as Masherbrum, K3 as Gasherbrum IV, K4 as Gasherbrum II and K5 as Gasherbrum I. Only K2, the second highest mountain in the world, has retained Montgomerie's name. Broad Peak was thought to miss out on a K-number as it was hidden from Montgomerie's view by Masherbrum.

== Climbing history ==
Mountain	altitude	first ascent	first winter ascent
Gasherbrum I	8068 m	1958 by Pete Schoening and A. J. Kauffman (USA)	2012 by Adam Bielecki, Janusz Gołąb (Poland)
Broad Peak (if included in group)	8047 m	1957 by Marcus Schmuck, Fritz Wintersteller, Kurt Diemberger and Hermann Buhl (Austria)	2013 by Adam Bielecki, Artur Małek, Maciej Berbeka, Tomasz Kowalski (Poland)
Gasherbrum II	8035 m	1956 by Fritz Moravec, S. Larch, H. Willenpart (Austria)	2011 by Simone Moro (Italy), Denis Urubko (Kazakhstan), Cory Richards (United States)
Gasherbrum III	7952 m	1975 by Wanda Rutkiewicz, Alison Chadwick-Onyszkiewicz, Janusz Onyszkiewicz and Krzysztof Zdzitowiecki (Poland)	Unclimbed in winter
Gasherbrum IV	7925 m	1958 by Walter Bonatti and Carlo Mauri (Italy)	Unclimbed in winter
Gasherbrum V	7147 m	2014 by S. Nakjong and A. Chi Young (Korea)	Unclimbed in winter
Gasherbrum VI	7001 m	Unclimbed, attempted 1998 by a French group (two dead) and a Danish group (Bo Belvedere Christensen, Mads Granlien and Jan Mathorne reaching 6200 m)	Unclimbed in winter
Gasherbrum VII	6755 m	2019 by Cala Cimenti (Italy)	Unclimbed in winter
Gasherbrum Twins		Unclimbed	Unclimbed in winter

== See also ==
- Concordia, Pakistan
- Eight-thousander
- List of highest mountains
- List of mountains in Pakistan

== Sources ==
- Mount Qogori (K2) {scale 1:100,000}; edited and mapped by Mi Desheng (Lanzhou Institute of Glaciology and Geocryology), the Xi´an Cartographic Publishing House.
- Dreams of Tibet: the pundits
