= Abdul Joshi =

Pakistani mountaineer (born 1984)

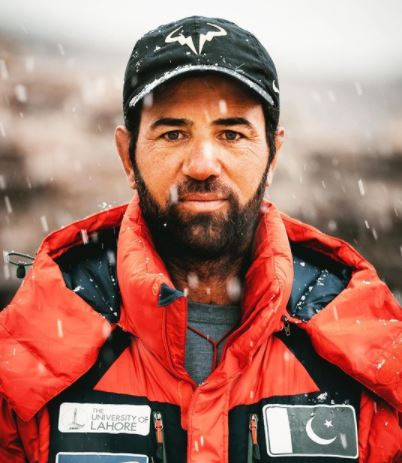
- Abdul Joshi at the base camp of Mt Annapurna
- Born: 3 December 1984 (age 41); Shimshal, Gilgit Baltistan, Pakistan
- Other name: Path Finder
- Occupation: Mountaineer
- Known for: First Pakistani to summit Mt. Annapurna

Abdul Joshi (born 3 December 1984) from Shimsal is a Pakistani mountaineer who became the first climber in the world to summit the main 6,076-metre (19,934 ft) Passu Cones peak in Pakistan's Gilgit-Baltistan on 14 August 2021. Abdul is known as the "Path Finder" amongst the local mountaineering fraternity for his talent for finding new, unclimbed routes. He is also the first person in the world to cross the F.N./Joshi Pass and Verjerav Pass. On 16 April 2021, Abdul became the first Pakistani to summit Annapurna, the tenth-highest peak in the world at 8,091 m (26,545 ft), along with his climbing partner, Sirbaz Khan. On 16 May 2022, he became the 8th Pakistani to summit Mount Everest.

Abdul started his mountaineering career as a high-altitude porter on 8,000 m (26,000 ft) mountain expeditions in Pakistan. He climbed his first peak, Manglik Sar (6,050 m [19,850 ft]), at the age of 18.

Joshi once went up to Camp 3 (7,400m) of K2 (8,611m) when an avalanche swept their tents away and crushed their summit dreams. He has also been on a G2 (8,034m) expedition.

Abdul has also been involved in multiple high-altitude rescue operations. In June 2019, Abdul, who was at Camp 3 of Passu Cones, only 500 m (1,600 ft) from the summit, received news of an avalanche that had hit an Italian-Pakistani expedition on Melvin Jones Peak (5,809 m [19,058 ft]). Abdul abandoned his expedition and joined a four-member team to rescue the stranded climbers. On 12 September 2021, Abdul led a successful rescue operation on Rakaposhi to retrieve three stranded climbers, two of whom were Czech citizens climbing without permits.

== Mountaineering expeditions ==
- Passu Cones 14 August 2021
- Annapurna 16 April 2021
- Mount Everest 16 May 2022
