= Fritz Moravec =

Austrian mountain climber (1922–1997)

Personal information
- Nationality: Austrian
- Born: 27 April 1922 Favoriten, Vienna, Austria
- Died: 17 March 1997 (aged 74) Vienna, Austria
- Occupations: Mountaineer, author

Climbing career
- Known for: Gasherbrum II first ascent

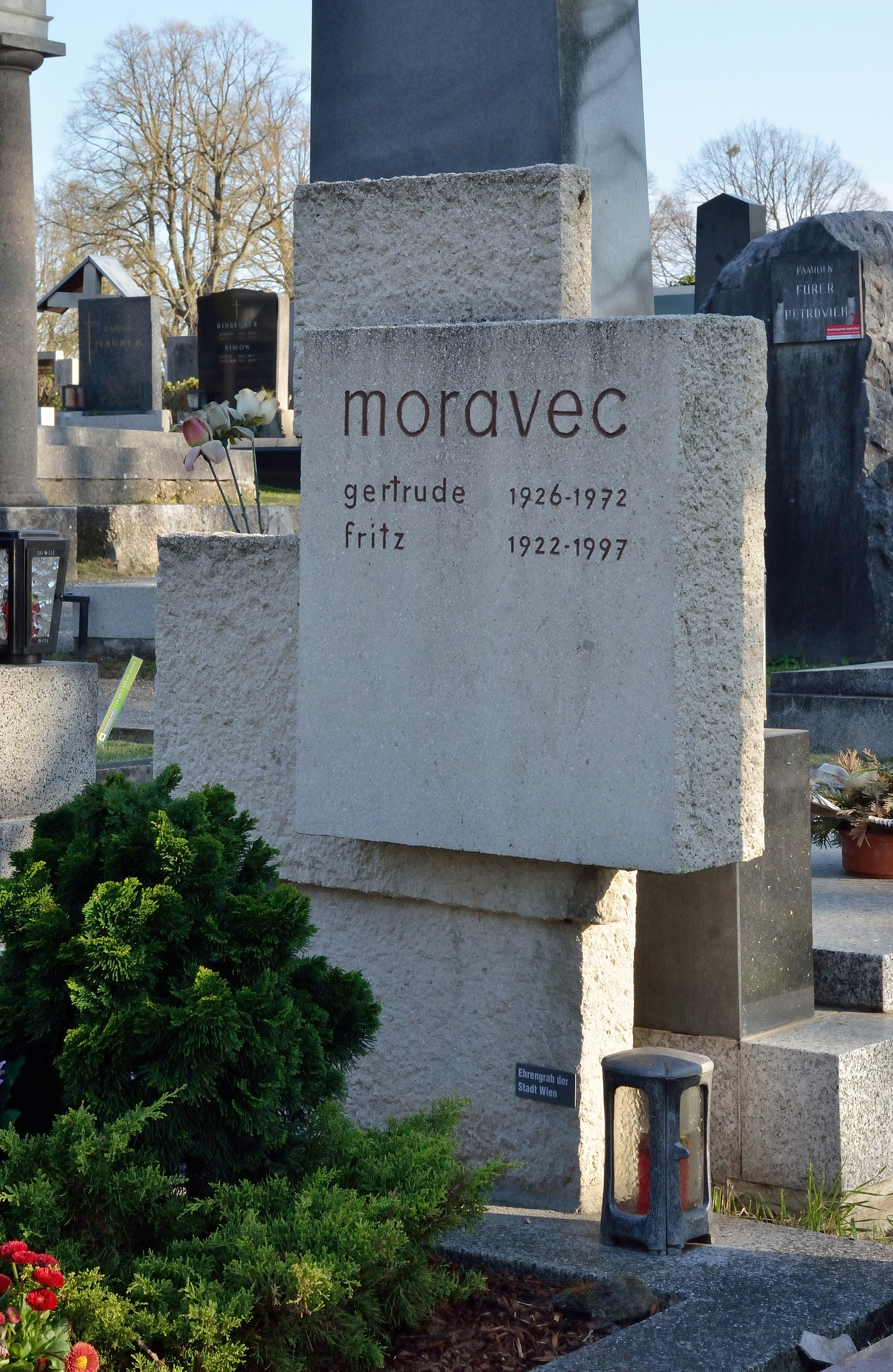

Fritz Moravec (27 April 1922 – 17 March 1997) was an Austrian mountaineer and author. He is best known for his numerous expeditions in the Karakoram range, where he participated in the first ascent of Gasherbrum II (8,034 m, 26,358 ft). Moravec was the founder of the Glockner-Kaprun mountaineering school.

== Life ==
Fritz Moravec was born on 27 April 1922 in the Favoriten tenth district of Vienna, Austria. After an apprenticeship as a motor mechanic, he studied mechanical engineering at the Technical University of Vienna. He developed a love of mountaineering from his father, a locomotive engineer, who served as a military mountain guide in the Dolomites during World War I. I 1942, Moravec served in one of the mountain units in the Caucasus during World War II.

After returning to Austria after the war in 1946, Moravec continued to study psychology and education and became a teacher in a specialized school for locksmithing. He spent his spare time with youth groups in the mountains, as in the Gesäuse, and led climbing courses. Moravec specialized in ice climbing. After 1950, he began climbing in the Western Alps, and by 1954 he climbed for the first time in the Himalayas to Saipal.

On 7 July 1956 he ascended Gasherbrum II with Josef Larch and Hans Willenpart. In the coming years, he participated in numerous other expeditions to the Spitsbergen, Dhaulagiri, and to Africa. For some time, Moravec's ascent of Gasherbrum II was questioned because he was not visible in summit photos. On 25 September 1995, in a lecture on Himalayan mountaineering held at Vienna's City Hall, Moravec stated:

At 8,035 meters in altitude it was so warm that we even took off our parkas. Not a cloud was in the sky, there was no wind, [...] Since there was no room on the two crags, Hans, Sepp and I built a small stone pyramid on the edge of the Firnfeld. I wrote down our route, day, hour, and our names on a piece of paper. I placed the paper in an empty film canister, along with a Mother of God Medallion, to whom I credit much of the success of this great mountain climb. My mother had given this medallion to me during the war, and it was very difficult leave it behind, but I wanted to make a small sacrifice in her honour. I wrapped the metal container in an Austrian state flag, and my companions placed it into the stone pyramid.

In 1959, Moravec led an Austrian expedition to Dhaulagiri. As the team approached the summit on 27 May 1959, they were forced to turn back due to poor weather conditions—a mere 300 m from their goal. Although the summit attempt failed, Moravec's team prepared the way and identified the route on the northeast ridge that would be used by the Swiss expedition the following year.

In 1962, Moravec was approached to participate in a Dutch Himalayan expedition. At the same time, he was approached by naturalists who wanted him to build a climbing school. Moravec chose the latter project, and soon founded the Glockner-Kaprun mountaineering school and remained its leader for thirty years. He created training programs for ten to thirteen-year-olds which are still recognized worldwide.

Moravec died on 17 March 1997 in Vienna. He was buried in Hietzinger cemetery. Following his death, his mountaineering school was renamed the Fritz Moravec High Mountain School in his honour.

== Works ==
- Weiße Berge: schwarze Menschen, 1958
- Dhaulagiri: Berg ohne Gnade, 1960
- Gefahren und Gefährten, 1961

== Awards ==
- Karl Renner Prize, awarded on December 13, 1956

== See also ==
- List of Austrian mountain climbers
