= Khosar Gang =

Khosar Gang is a mountain located in Shigar valley of Baltistan. It is the tallest mountain in the Shigar Valley. The mountain is also referred to as Koser Gunge, which is how it is labeled in Google and other maps There is controversy over the actual height of the mountain. The official height is 6400 meters, however all who have climbed the mountain claim that its actual height is 6040 meters. The highest contour curve on Google Maps is 5980 meters. The most popular and safest time to climb is July.

== Location ==
The base camp is located at a height of 3800m, and is accessible from Skardu which is 45km away. The climb begins in the village of Sildi.

== Notable Climbs ==
- February 2022 - Denis Urubko completes the first winter summit of Khosar Gang
- April 2022 - Shane Roche, William Gawron, and Joseph Haynes attempt the first spring summit of Khosar Gang. The expedition was ultimately unsuccessful due to high avalanche risk.
