= Markus Kronthaler =

Austrian mountain climber

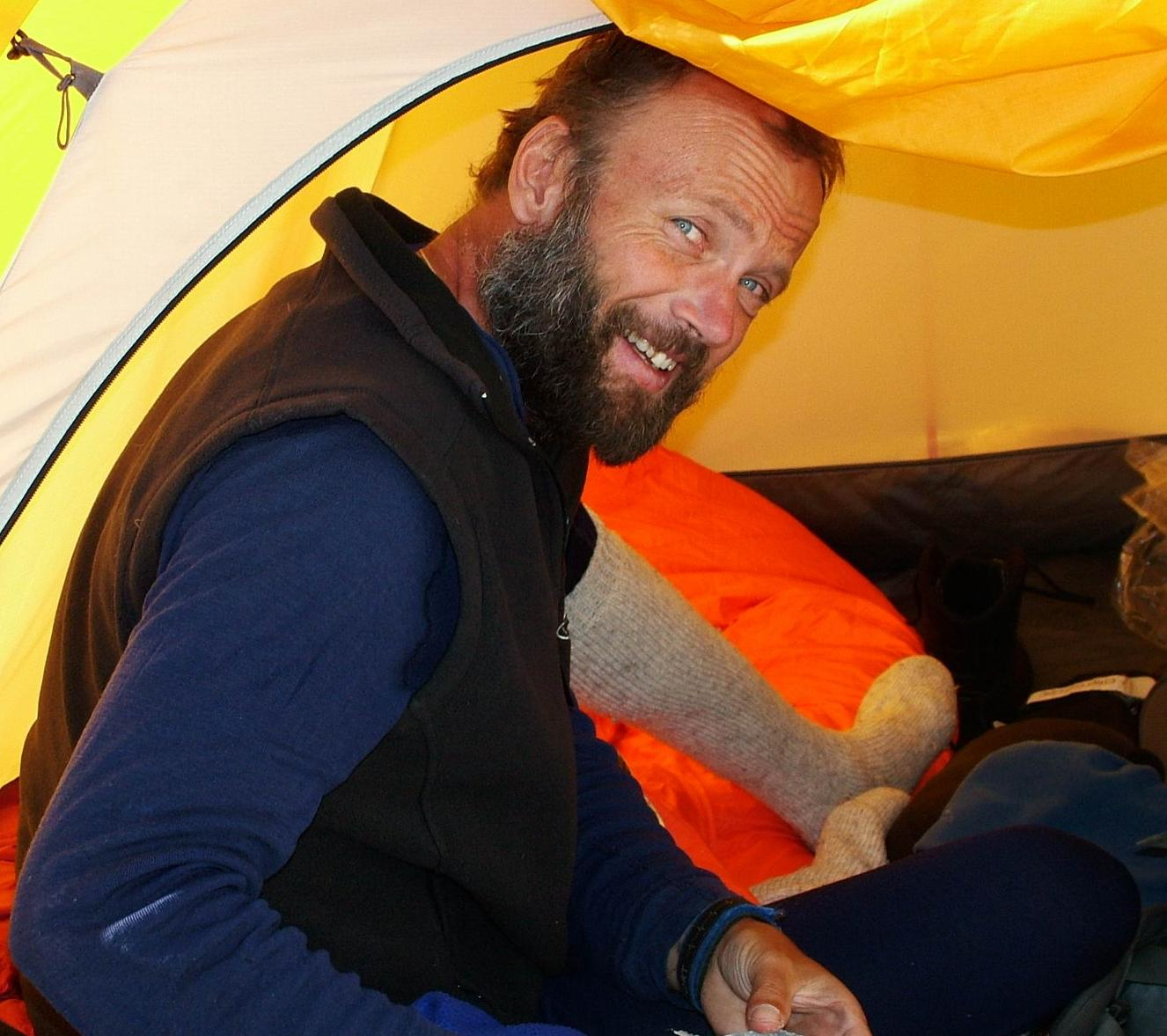
- Markus Kronthaler at Camp One, Nanga Parbat, 2004

Personal information
- Nationality: Austrian
- Born: 5 April 1967 Kufstein, Tyrol, Austria
- Died: 8 July 2006 (aged 39) Broad Peak, Karakoram, Pakistan
- Occupations: Gendarme, mountaineer

Climbing career
- Major ascents: Shisha Pangma; Ama Dablam; Muztagata; Nanga Parbat; Broad Peak

Markus Kronthaler (5 April 1967 – 8 July 2006) was an Austrian gendarme and mountaineer.

Kronthaler was born in Kufstein, Tyrol. He was an officer in the alpine section of Austria's Gendarmerie, which he left in 2003 to become a professional climber. Surviving a free fall of 150 meters (450 ft) into snow in January 2006, Kronthaler led a new expedition to Chogolisa and Broad Peak, Pakistan, in May 2006. He died of exhaustion on Broad Peak after reaching the summit on 8 July. His body was left on the mountain.

In the summer of 2007, an Austrian mountaineering team climbed Broad Peak to retrieve Kronthaler's corpse, which was brought to Austria and cremated. This was the highest-ever body recovery from a mountain. His urn was buried in Kufstein.

== Expeditions ==
- 2000: Shishapangma (8013 m), Himalaya, Tibet – Gendarmerie-Mountain Guides-Expedition
- 2002: Ama Dablam (6856 m), Himalaya, Nepal
- 2004: Muztagata (7546 m), Pamir, China
- 2004: Nanga Parbat (8125 m), Kashmir, Pakistan – „Nanga Parbat - Edelweissexpedition 2004“
- 2006: Broad Peak (8047 m) and Chogolisa (7665 m), Karakoram, Pakistan
