= Cala Cimenti =

Italian mountaineer (1975–2021)

- Born: Carlalberto Cimenti; 14 February 1975; Turin, Italy
- Died: 8 February 2021 (aged 45); Susa Valley, Italy
- Occupation: Mountaineer
- Spouse: Erika Siffedri

Carlalberto "Cala" Cimenti (14 February 1975 – 8 February 2021) was an Italian mountaineer.

== Biography ==
A child prodigy of mountaineering, Cimenti climbed Mont Blanc with his father at age 12. In 2015, he became the first Italian to win a Snow Leopard award. He also climbed Cho Oyu, Manaslu, Dhaulagiri I, Nanga Parbat and Gasherbrum VII, where he saved the life of his friend, fellow mountaineer and former rugby player Francesco Cassardo.

Six days before his 46th birthday, Cimenti was killed by an avalanche in the Susa Valley with his friend, Patrick Negro. He had been married to Erika Siffedri since 2018 and had a book published in 2020, titled Sdraiato in cima al mondo.
