= Jägerhorn =

Mountain in Switzerland

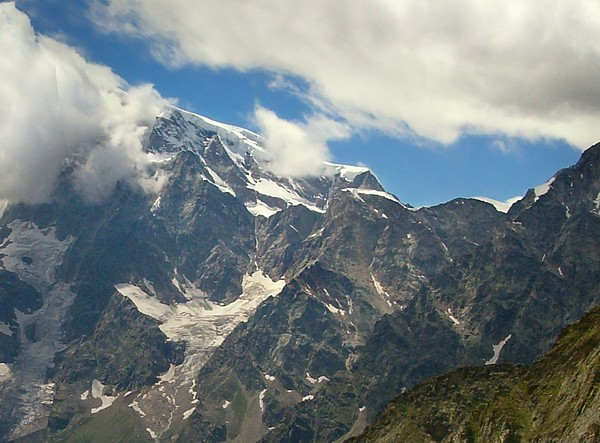

Highest point
- Elevation: 3,970 m (13,020 ft)
- Prominence: 58 m (190 ft)
- Parent peak: Monte Rosa
- Coordinates: 45°57′8.2″N 7°52′37.9″E

Geography
- Location within Alps
- Location: Valais, Switzerland; Piedmont, Italy
- Parent range: Pennine Alps

The Jägerhorn is a mountain of the Pennine Alps, located on the border between Switzerland and Italy. It is the northernmost summit of Monte Rosa, at a height of 3,970 metres above sea level, and overlooks the village of Macugnaga on its east side (in the Italian region of Piedmont), 2,600 metres below. On its west side it overlooks the Gorner Glacier (Swiss canton of Valais).

Near the summit (3,960 m) is located a small mountain hut, the Bivacco Città di Gallarate. It is owned by the Italian Alpine Club.
