= Jean Troillet =

Swiss mountaineer

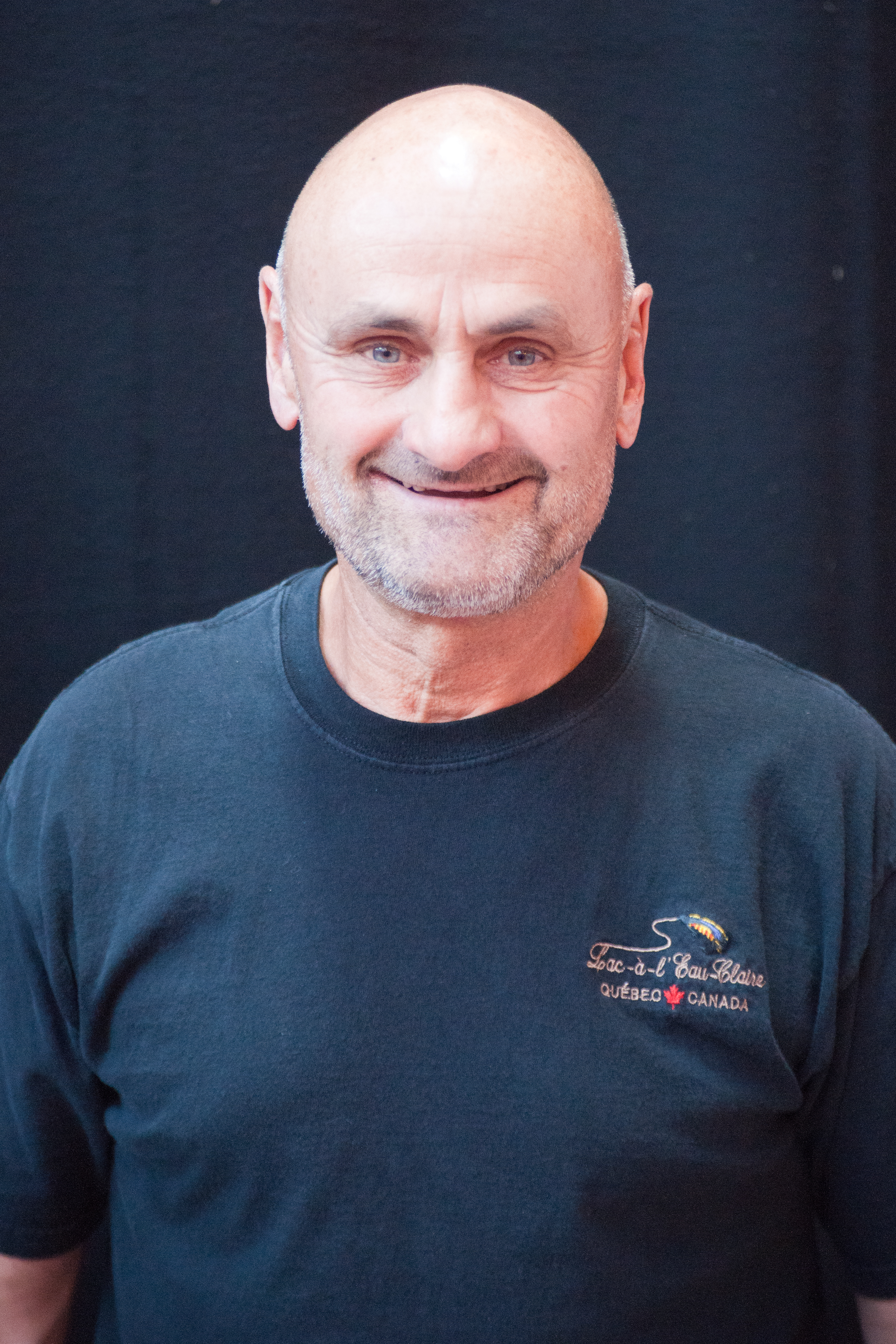
- Jean Troillet
- Born: 10 March 1948 (age 77); Orsières, Valais, Switzerland
- Known for: Fastest speed ascent of Mount Everest
- Spouse: Mireille Troillet
- Children: 1, Gustine
- Website: http://www.troillet.ch/

Jean Troillet (born 10 March 1948) is a professional mountain climber.

Of Swiss and Canadian nationality, he obtained his mountain guide qualifications in 1969. That year, at the age of 21, he set a speed record for an ascent of the Matterhorn of four hours and ten minutes. He has climbed 10 peaks of more than 8000 meters, all in alpine style and without oxygen.

Together with Erhard Loretan, Troillet climbed Everest in 1986. The pair holds the speed record for the ascent of Everest by the North Face, 43 hours to the summit and back.

In 1997, he returned to Everest to make the first snowboard descent from the world's tallest mountain. After summiting without supplementary oxygen, he began his descent at 28,500 feet. The ride set an unprecedented altitude record at the time, although was a bit more than 500 feet below the actual summit.

In the 1990s, he began sailing.

In 2001, Troillet, Mike Horn and Erhard Loretan attempted to cross Greenland on skis pulled by kites for a world record attempt. Poor winds prevented their attempt.

In 2009, he completed a new route on the north face of the Matterhorn. He climbed the route in memory of his friend Sébastien Gay, who died the year before in a skiing accident. Troillet placed his friend's ashes at the summit.

== The 8000-metre peaks of Jean Troillet ==
- K2, 8611 m
- Dhaulagiri, 8167 m
- Everest, 8848 m
- Cho Oyu, 8201 m
- Shisha Pangma, 8013 m
- Makalu, 8463 m
- Lhotse, 8516 m
- Kangchenjunga, 8586 m
- Gasherbrum I, 8068 m
- Gasherbrum II, 8035 m

== Filmography ==
- 30 Years between 20 Meters of Rope, 2004
- Montagnes de rêve: la Haute Route, 2005
- South Face Annapurna: Living is Victory, 2008
- La Voie Sébastien Gay, 2009
- Un Violon au Shishapangma, 2010
- Vertiges à l'Annapurna, 2012
- Montagnes de rêve: le Grand Paradis, 2013
- Bylot Island, 2013
- Groenland pourquoi pas?, 2016
- Jean Troillet, Toujours Aventurier - 2016

== See also ==
- List of 20th-century summiters of Mount Everest
