= Broad Peak =

12th-highest mountain on Earth

- Falchan Kangri
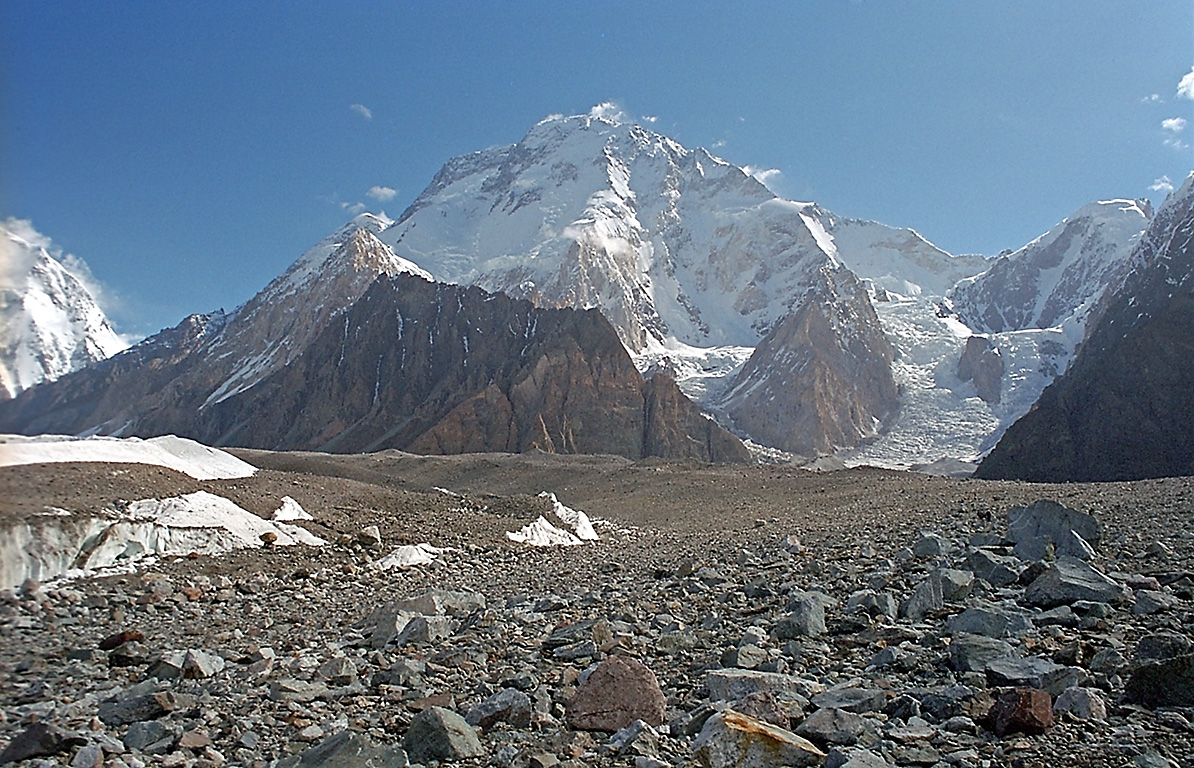
- Broad Peak

Highest point
- Elevation: 8,051 m (26,414 ft); Ranked 12th
- Prominence: 1,701 m (5,581 ft)
- Listing: Eight-thousander; Ultra; List of mountains in China; List of mountains in Pakistan
- Coordinates: 35°48′49″N 76°33′55″E

Naming
- Native name: ཕལ་ཆན་ཀང་གྲི (Balti); Urdu: بروڈ پیک

Geography
- Location within Karakoram Location within Gilgit Baltistan Location within Southern Xinjiang
- The major peaks in Karakoram are rank identified by height. Legend: 1：K2; 2：Gasherbrum I, K5; 3：Broad Peak; 4：Gasherbrum II, K4; 5：Gasherbrum III, K3a; 6：Gasherbrum IV, K3; 7：Distaghil Sar; 8：Kunyang Chhish; 9：Masherbrum, K1; 10：Batura Sar, Batura I; 11：Rakaposhi; 12：Batura II; 13：Kanjut Sar; 14：Saltoro Kangri, K10; 15：Batura III; 16： Saser Kangri I, K22; 17：Chogolisa; 18：Shispare; 19：Trivor Sar; 20：Skyang Kangri; 21：Mamostong Kangri, K35; 22：Saser Kangri II; 23：Saser Kangri III; 24：Pumari Chhish; 25：Passu Sar; 26：Yukshin Gardan Sar; 27：Teram Kangri I; 28：Malubiting; 29：K12; 30：Sia Kangri; 31：Momhil Sar; 32：Skil Brum; 33：Haramosh Peak; 34：Ghent Kangri; 35：Ultar Sar; 36：Rimo Massif; 37：Sherpi Kangri; 38：Yazghil Dome South; 39：Baltoro Kangri; 40：Crown Peak; 41：Baintha Brakk; 42：Yutmaru Sar; 43：K6; 44：Muztagh Tower; 45：Diran; 46：Apsarasas Kangri I; 47：Rimo III; 48：Gasherbrum V; Location of Broad Peak
- Location: Baltistan, Gilgit–Baltistan, Pakistan; Tashkurgan, Xinjiang, China; China–Pakistan border
- Parent range: Karakoram

Climbing
- First ascent: 9 June 1957, by an Austrian team (First winter ascent 5 March 2013 Maciej Berbeka, Adam Bielecki, Tomasz Kowalski and Artur Małek)
- Easiest route: snow/ice climb

Broad Peak
- Traditional Chinese: 布洛阿特峰
Transcriptions
Standard Mandarin
- Hanyu Pinyin: Bù luò ā tè fēng

Broad Peak (Note: Urdu: بروڈ پیک; Balti: ཕ༹ལ་ཆན་གངས་རི་།, romanized: Falchan Kangri, lit. 'Broad Peak') is the 12th highest mountain in the world at 8,051 metres (26,414 ft) elevation above sea level. It is one of the eight-thousanders, and is located in the Karakoram range spanning Gilgit-Baltistan, Pakistan, and Xinjiang, China. The first ascent of this mountain was in June 1957, accomplished by Fritz Wintersteller, Marcus Schmuck, Kurt Diemberger, and Hermann Buhl as part of an Austrian expedition.

== Geography ==
Broad Peak is part of the Gasherbrum massif in Baltistan situated on the border of Pakistan and China. It is located in the Karakoram mountain range, approximately eight kilometres (five miles) from K2. The peak's name aptly describes its physical characteristics, with a summit that extends over 1.5 kilometres (7/8 mile) in length, giving it the appearance of a "broad peak."

In addition to the main summit (8051 m), two of the mountain's subsidiary peaks are eight-thousanders: Rocky Summit (8028 m) and Broad Peak Central (8011 m), with Broad Peak North (7490 m), and Kharut Kangri (6942 m) being the other two peaks.

== Etymology ==
The literal translation of "Broad Peak" to Falchan Kangri is not used among the Balti people. The English name was introduced in 1892 by the British explorer Martin Conway, in reference to the similarly named Breithorn in the Alps.

== Climbing history ==
The first known ascent of Broad Peak was achieved between 8 and 9 June 1957, by Fritz Wintersteller, Marcus Schmuck, Kurt Diemberger, and Hermann Buhl of an Austrian expedition led by Marcus Schmuck. A first attempt by the team was made on 29 May where Fritz Wintersteller and Kurt Diemberger reached the forepeak (8,030 m). The first ascent took the West Spur and was accomplished without the aid of supplemental oxygen, high-altitude porters, or base camp support.

In July 2007, an Austrian mountaineering team climbed Broad Peak and retrieved the corpse of Markus Kronthaler, who had died on the mountain one year before, from over 8,000 metres.

In 2008, French mountaineer Élisabeth Revol made solo ascents of Broad Peak, Gasherbrum I and Gasherbrum II within 16 days and without the aid of supplemental oxygen.

In the winter and summer of 2009, there were no summits. There was one winter expedition by a Polish-Canadian team. In the summer there was one fatality, Cristina Castagna.

In the summer of 2012, five members of "Koroška 8000", a Slovenian team led by Gregor Lačen, summitted the mountain without supplementary oxygen or high-altitude porters. They established a route in deep snow from Camp 4 to the summit, used by seven additional climbers from other expeditions. All summitted on 31 July 2012.

On 5 March 2013, Maciej Berbeka, Adam Bielecki, Tomasz Kowalski and Artur Małek made the first winter ascent and conquered the mountain peak without oxygen during the winter. Broad Peak was the twelfth eight-thousander summited in wintertime and the tenth eight-thousander first summitted in winter by the Polish climbers. During the descent, Maciej Berbeka and Tomasz Kowalski did not reach Camp 4 (at 7400 m) and were pronounced missing. On 7 March, the head of the expedition Krzysztof Wielicki, said there are "no chances at all" of finding alive 58-year-old Maciej Berbeka and 27-year-old Tomasz Kowalski. On 8 March both climbers were declared dead and the expedition was ended.

In July 2013, a group of five Iranian climbers attempted to ascend through a new route from the southwestern face. Three of them — Aidin Bozorgi, Pouya Keivan, and Mojtaba Jarahi — ascended successfully but during the descent all three of them were lost and declared dead.

On 23 July 2016, Frenchman Antoine Girard's paraglider flight over Broad Peak was the first time a paraglider had flown above an 8,000-metre summit.

On 14 July 2019, 17-year-old Shehroze Kashif from Pakistan became the youngest ever to summit this peak.

=== 2026 avalanche ===
On 30 July 2026, an avalanche struck a group of ten summit-bound climbers on the slope between Camp 2 and Camp 3, sweeping them down the mountain. Three climbers — Nadhira Al Harthy of Oman, Pur Bahadur Gurung of Nepal, and Mallory Geis of United States — were confirmed dead, while seven others, including Nirmal Purja and Pakistani climber Sohail Sakhi, remained missing until confirmed dead on 1 August 2026.

== Timeline ==
- 1954 First attempt by Dr. Karl Herrligkoffer of Germany on the SW side that failed due to a storm and extreme cold.
- 1957 First ascent by an Austrian expedition.
- 1982 Reinhold Messner summits.
- 1983 First ascent by a woman, Krystyna Palmowska.
- 1984 Broad Peak climbed in one-day (solo) by Krzysztof Wielicki in 21.5 hours; the first one-day ascent of an 8000-meter peak.
- 1988 On 6 March, Maciej Berbeka climbed to the 'Rocky Summit' (8028 m), becoming the first person to reach one of the summits of Broad Peak over 8000m during the winter.
- 1988 On 1 August, Italian climber Claudio Schranz reached the summit during an Italian expedition after the other members had abandoned their summit attempt.
- 1992 On 4 August, Enric Dalmau Ferré, Òscar Cadiach, Alberto Soncini and Lluís Ràfols were the first to reach the summit from the Chinese side.
- 1994 On 9 July, Carlos Carsolio reached the summit, establishing a new solo route now known as Route Carsolio.
- 1997 On 7 July, Anatoli Boukreev achieved a solo ascent.
- 2013 On 5 March, first winter ascent by Polish expedition.
- 2013 July, Aidin Bozorgi, Pouya Keivan, and Mojtaba Jarahi of Iran ascended through a new route, named Route Iran.
- 2014 Hunza Expedition to Broad Peak made the summit on 23 July 2014, Karim Hayat reached to main summit and Naseer Uddin turned back from Rocky summit. Karim Hayat became the first person from his village who reached 8000 m.
- 2019 July 14, Shehroze Kashif at the age of 17 became the youngest ever to summit this peak. He also became the youngest Pakistani to reach this altitude.
- 2019 July 26, Nirmal Purja summits Broad-Peak with his team 'Elite Exped', as part of his expedition to climb all 14 peaks exceeding 8000m in a record time of less than 7 months.
- 2023 Nirmal Purja and Migma G summit Broad Peak as part of an effort to climb all 14 8,000 meter peaks without supplemental oxygen.
- 2026 July 30, ten climbers — Nirmal Purja (Nimsdai), Pur Bahadur Gurung (Yukta), Nima Sherpa, Nadhira Al Harthy, Kili Pemba Sherpa (Kilu), Nawang Thindu Sherpa, Gyalu Sherpa, Sohail Sakhi, Mallory Geis and Wang Zhong — were killed by an avalanche. The 2026 Broad Peak avalanche marked the biggest single fatal incident on the mountain.

== Passes ==
Windy Gap is a 6,111-metre (20,049 ft)-high mountain pass 35.8732°N 76.5769°E east of K2, north of Broad Peak, and south of Skyang Kangri.

== See also ==
- 2026 Broad Peak avalanche
- List of deaths on Broad Peak
- List of mountains in Pakistan
- Highest Mountains of the World
- List of Austrian mountaineers
