= Gasherbrum II =

13th-highest mountain on Earth

- گاشر برم - ۲ K4
- Location within Karakoram Location within Gilgit Baltistan Location within Southern Xinjiang
- The major peaks in Karakoram are rank identified by height. Legend: 1：K2; 2：Gasherbrum I, K5; 3：Broad Peak; 4：Gasherbrum II, K4; 5：Gasherbrum III, K3a; 6：Gasherbrum IV, K3; 7：Distaghil Sar; 8：Kunyang Chhish; 9：Masherbrum, K1; 10：Batura Sar, Batura I; 11：Rakaposhi; 12：Batura II; 13：Kanjut Sar; 14：Saltoro Kangri, K10; 15：Batura III; 16： Saser Kangri I, K22; 17：Chogolisa; 18：Shispare; 19：Trivor Sar; 20：Skyang Kangri; 21：Mamostong Kangri, K35; 22：Saser Kangri II; 23：Saser Kangri III; 24：Pumari Chhish; 25：Passu Sar; 26：Yukshin Gardan Sar; 27：Teram Kangri I; 28：Malubiting; 29：K12; 30：Sia Kangri; 31：Momhil Sar; 32：Skil Brum; 33：Haramosh Peak; 34：Ghent Kangri; 35：Ultar Sar; 36：Rimo Massif; 37：Sherpi Kangri; 38：Yazghil Dome South; 39：Baltoro Kangri; 40：Crown Peak; 41：Baintha Brakk; 42：Yutmaru Sar; 43：K6; 44：Muztagh Tower; 45：Diran; 46：Apsarasas Kangri I; 47：Rimo III; 48：Gasherbrum V; Location of Gasherbrum II

Highest point
- Elevation: 8,035 m (26,362 ft); Ranked 13th
- Prominence: 1,524 m (5,000 ft)
- Listing: Eight-thousander; Ultra; List of mountains in China; List of mountains in Pakistan
- Coordinates: 35°45′30″N 76°39′12″E

Geography
- Location: Baltistan, Gilgit–Baltistan, Pakistan; Tashkurgan, Xinjiang, China, China–Pakistan border
- Parent range: Karakoram

Climbing
- First ascent: July 7, 1956, by Fritz Moravec, Josef Larch and Hans Willenpart
- Easiest route: Snow/ice climb

Gasherbrum II, (Note: Balti: རྒ་ཥཱ་བྲུམ་། - ༢, romanized: rgasha brum 2, lit. 'Beautiful Mountain 2'; Urdu: گاشر برم - ۲; simplified Chinese: 加舒尔布鲁木II峰; traditional Chinese: 加舒爾布魯木II峰; pinyin: Jiāshūěrbùlǔmù II Fēng) originally surveyed as K4, is the 13th highest mountain in the world at 8,035 metres (26,362 ft) above sea level. It is the third-highest peak of the Gasherbrum massif, and is located in the Karakoram, on the border between Gilgit–Baltistan, Pakistan and Xinjiang, China. The mountain was first climbed on July 7, 1956, by an Austrian expedition which included Fritz Moravec, Josef Larch, and Hans Willenpart.

== Geography ==
Gasherbrum II is located on the border of Gilgit–Baltistan, Pakistan, and Xinjiang, China in the Karakorum range, located at the top of the Baltoro Glacier. With an elevation of 8,034 metres (26,358 ft) it is the third-highest member of the Gasherbrum group, behind Gasherbrum I (8,080 metres or 26,510 feet) and Broad Peak (8,051 metres or 26,414 feet). Gasherbrum III is sometimes considered to be a subpeak of Gasherbrum II, because the former has a topographic prominence of only 461 metres (1,512 ft).

== Naming ==
In 1856, Thomas George Montgomerie, a member of the British Royal Engineers and part of the Great Trigonometric Survey, sighted the mountain and named it "K4", meaning the fourth mountain of Karakoram. The name "Gasherbrum" comes from the Balti words rgasha ("beautiful") and brum ("mountain"). Contrary to popular belief, it does not mean "shining wall", which is how Sir William Martin Conway described nearby Gasherbrum IV on an 1892 exploration. It is also informally named G2.

== Climbing history ==
The mountains of the Gasherbrum group were explored in 1909 by the Duke of the Abruzzi and Vittorio Sella. The Abruzzi Glacier, a tributary of the Baltoro Glacier, is named after the Duke.

In 1934, Günter Dyhrenfurth and his International Himalayan Expedition, including André Roch, explored Gasherbrum I and II, making it 6,250 metres (20,510 ft) up Gasherbrum II.

The first ascent came on July 7, 1956, by Austrians Fritz Moravec, Josef Larch and Hans Willenpart by the Southwest Ridge. After they set up Camp I, they had to descend, and found the camp—and all their supplies and food—buried by an avalanche when they returned. Despite this, they decided to make a quick summit attempt. After opening up a route, they left Camp III on July 6. The group spent the night in a bivouac sack and reached the top at 11:30 am the next day.

=== 1970s ===
In 1975, four expeditions successfully climbed Gasherbrum II, including Jean-Pierre Fresafond's French expedition, a Polish group under Janusz Onyszkiewicz. On August 12, 1975 Anna Okopińska and Haliną Krüger-Syrokomską became the first women to reach the summit of the mountain, they were members of another Polish expedition which was led by Wanda Rutkiewicz.

Four years later, a Chilean group claimed to have used the "normal" route to reach the top. Several others, including Reinhard Karl, Hanns Schell, and Kurt Diemberger also reached the summit.

=== 1980s ===
Swiss Mountaineers Romolo Nottaris and Tiziano Zünd were the first to reach the summit in alpine style on August 3, 1981.

On July 24, 1982, Reinhold Messner, along with Nazir Sabir and Sher Khan, climbed the peak via the Southwest Ridge. During the ascent, Messner discovered the body of a previously missing Austrian mountaineer, whom he buried two years later at the G I – G II crossing. He wrote of his climb of Gasherbrum II in the book 3 x 8000: My Great Year in the Himalaya (German: 3 x 8000: Mein grosses Himalaja-Jahr).

In July 1984, Reinhold Messner and Hans Kammerlander reached both Gasherbrum II and Gasherbrum I without returning to base camp, in alpine style.

In August 1984, a French expedition led by Daniel Croisot, reached the summit and achieved the integral first descent by ski of Gasherbrum II, as witnessed and joined by Dominique Dock who was medical officer for the expedition. Patrice Bournat and Wim Pasquier skied the southwest ridge to Base Camp from 7,500 m (24,600 ft).

In August 1986, Gasherbrum II was successfully ascended by a Slovene expedition in only 32 hours from the base to the peak, with only 22 hours of climbing and 10 hours of rest at the altitude of 5900 m. This was by far the fastest ascent until then.

=== 1990s ===
In July 1996, Jean-Christophe Lafaille climbed Gasherbrum I and II in four days, without stopping at Base Camp in between.

In 1997 Anatoli Boukreev achieved a solo speed ascent, camp ABC (5800 metres) to summit in 9 hours 30 min.

=== 2000s ===
In 2006, Sebastian Haag and Benedikt Böhm climbed Gasherbrum II twice within a week. At 8:00 am on July 29, they reached the top and then skied down without abseiling or removing their skis. They rested for a few days before leaving Camp I again on August 3. They started out fast, reaching Camp IV in six hours, but 50 centimetres (20 in) of fresh snow slowed them down, and they reached the summit after over six hours of tough climbing. They descended on skis again, this time made even more dangerous by packed-down snow and the risk of avalanche. Despite this, they both made it safely back to Camp I in under 17 hours, whereas a normal expedition takes four to seven days.

Karl Unterkircher and Daniele Bernasconi, two Italians, climbed Gasherbrum II in 2007 in alpine style. They were the first to use the North Face through China. The route had been attempted a year earlier by a German–Swiss team, but they abandoned it after an avalanche. During the attempt they fixed around 1,200 metres (3,900 ft) of rope. They arrived at the summit around 8:00 pm on July 20, after spending the night in a bivouac shelter. A third member, Michele Compagnoni, grandson of Achille Compagnoni, turned back just 150 metres (490 ft) before the summit. The team reunited and descended down the normal, northwest route.

=== 2010s ===
On July 22, 2011, Leila Esfandyari successfully completed the ascent to the peak but she died while descending.

On February 2, 2011, Cory Richards, Denis Urubko, and Simone Moro made the first winter ascent of Gasherbrum II. Despite being buried by a class-four avalanche, they reached the summit at 11:30 am, without supplemental oxygen or porters. Richards, who was the first American to climb an eight-thousander in winter, filmed the expedition, which he turned into the film Cold.

On July 16, 2018, Felix Berg and Adam Bielecki summited Gasherbrum II making what is arguably the first ascent of the true West Face.

=== 2020s ===
In 2021, two French ski teams, including Boris Langenstein, Tiphaine Duperier, Aurelia Lanoe, and Guillaume Pierrel successfully skied Gasherbrum. On July 18, 2023, Hugo Ayaviri climbed Gasherbrum II without oxygen, the fourth 8000’er in his quest to be the first Bolivian to summit all fourteen 8000m peaks.

On July 19, 2023, Andrzej Bargiel made the highest descent from Gasherbrum II on skis. He summited the mountain without using supplemental oxygen and began his ski descent from 26,362 feet up, over 8,000m.

== See also ==
- List of deaths on Gasherbrum II
- List of highest mountains

== Bibliography ==
- Dyhrenfurth, G. O. (2011) [1955]. To the Third Pole. London. ISBN 978-1-4465-4447-1.
- Isserman, Maurice; Weaver, Stewart Angas (2010). Fallen Giants: A History of Himalayan Mountaineering from the Age of Empire to the Age of Extremes. Yale University Press. ISBN 978-0-300-16420-6.
- Messner, Reinhold (1999). All 14 Eight-Thousanders. The Mountaineers Books. ISBN 978-0-89886-660-5. Archived from the original on February 4, 2014.
