= List of deaths on eight-thousanders =

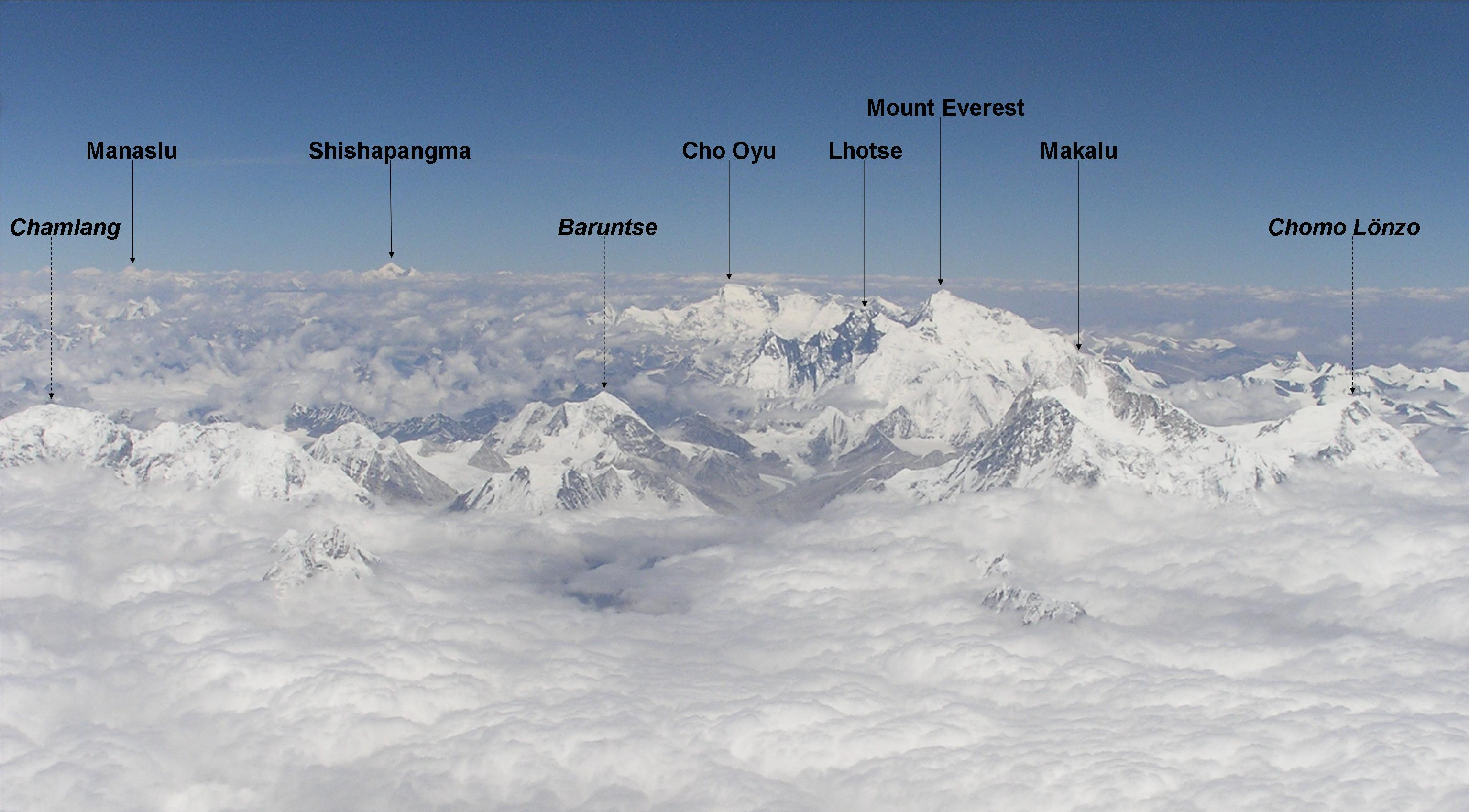
Six of the fourteen summits of the Eight-Thousanders (Manaslu, Shishapangma, Cho Oyu, Lhotse, Mt. Everest and Makalu).

The eight-thousanders are the 14 mountains that rise more than 8,000 metres (26,247 ft) above sea level. They are all in the Himalayan and Karakoram mountain ranges. This is a list of mountaineers who have died on these mountains.

== By mountain ==
=== Mount Everest ===
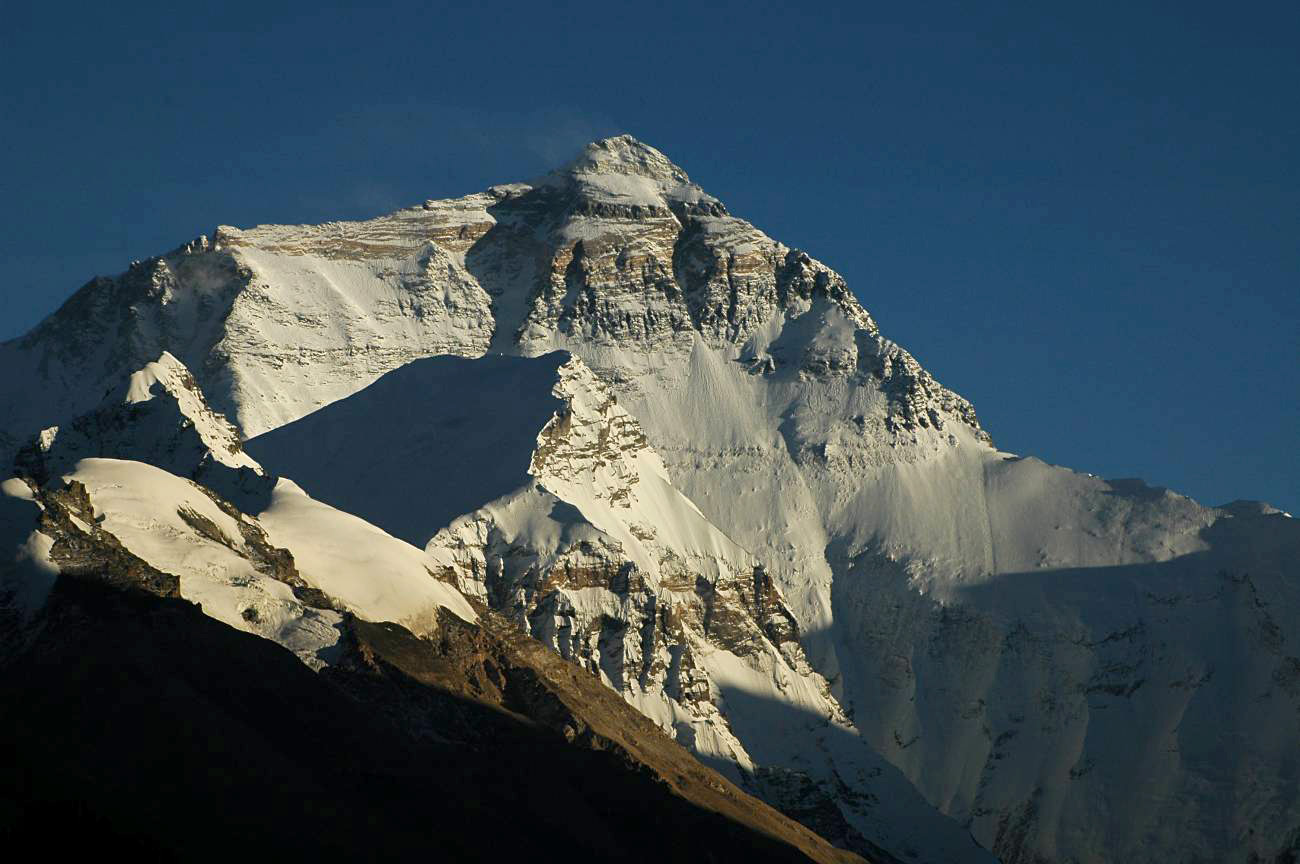
North face of Mount Everest.

Mount Everest, Earth's highest mountain at 8,848.86 metres (29,031.7 ft) above sea level, has been host to numerous tragedies. Deaths have occurred on the mountain every year since 1978, excluding 2020, when permits were not issued due to the COVID-19 pandemic. The most notable deadly events on Everest were the 1922 British Mount Everest expedition, 1970 Mount Everest disaster, 1974 French Mount Everest expedition, 1996 Mount Everest disaster, 2014 Mount Everest ice avalanche, 2015 Mount Everest avalanches and 2023 Mount Everest season. As of December 2024, there had been 12,884 successful summits, and 340 people had died either before or after reaching the peak. Since 2019 the Nepali government has initiated periodic "clean-up" campaigns on the mountain, including bodies of climbers.

=== K2 ===
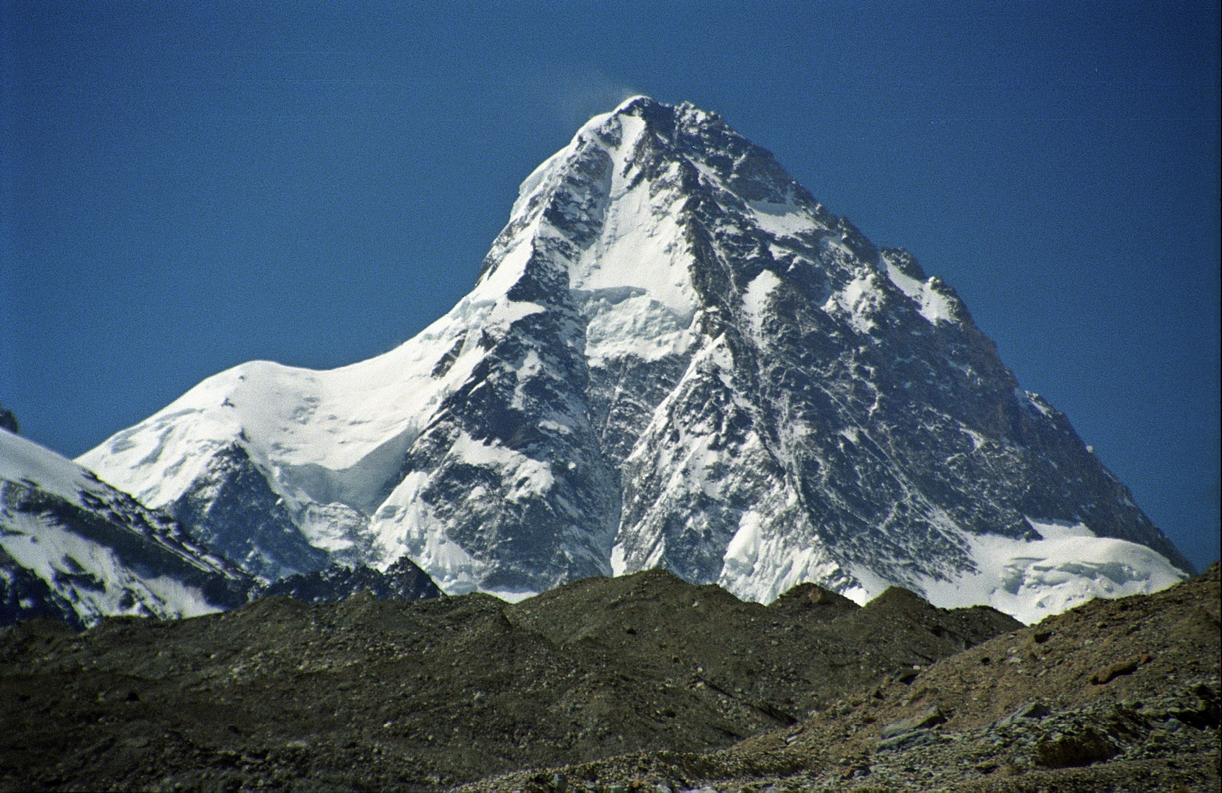
Northern vantage of K2.

K2 is the world's second-highest mountain at 8,611 meters (28,251 ft) above sea level. It lies in the Karakoram range, partially in the Gilgit-Baltistan region of Pakistan-administered Kashmir and partially in the China-administered Trans-Karakoram Tract in the Taxkorgan Tajik Autonomous County of Xinjiang. While its summit is at a lower altitude than the summit of Mount Everest, it is considered a much harder mountain to climb due to its steep faces and extreme weather. The most deadly events on K2 were the 1986 K2 disaster, 1995 K2 disaster, and 2008 K2 disaster. As of August 2023, an estimated 800 people had completed a summit, and 96 had died on the mountain.

List of deaths on K2
Date	Name	Nationality	Cause of death	References
12 August 2025	Jing Guan	China	Rock fall	
18 July 2025	Iftikhar Hussain	Pakistan	Avalanche	
28 July 2024	Kazuya Hiraide	Japan	Unknown, possible fall	
28 July 2024	Kenro Nakajima	Japan	Unknown, possible fall	
14 July 2024	Ser Muhammad	Pakistan	Acute mountain sickness	
27 July 2023	Muhammad Hassan Shigri	Pakistan	Unknown	
22 July 2022	Matthew Eakin	Australia	Fall	
22 July 2022	Richard Cartier	Canada	Fall	
21 July 2022	Ali Akbar Sakhi	Afghanistan	Unknown, suspected altitude sickness	
25 July 2021	Rick Allen	United Kingdom	Avalanche	
5 February 2021	Ali Sadpara	Pakistan	2021 K2 disaster: Froze to death in storm, remains found July 2021	
5 February 2021	Juan Pablo Mohr Prieto	Chile	2021 K2 disaster: Froze to death in storm, remains found July 2021	
5 February 2021	John Snorri Sigurjónsson	Iceland	2021 K2 disaster: Froze to death in storm, remains found July 2021	
5 February 2021	Atanas Skatov	Bulgaria	Fall during descent from Camp 3	
16 January 2021	Sergi Mingote	Spain	Fall during descent from Camp 1	
22 July 2018	Watanabe Kojiro	Japan	Fall during descent	
7 July 2018	Serge Dessureault	Canada	Fall	
30 July 2014	Miguel Ángel Pérez	Spain	Unclear, likely altitude sickness	
26/27 July 2013	Marty Schmidt	New Zealand / United States	Avalanche	
26/27 July 2013	Denali Schmidt	New Zealand / United States	Avalanche	
6 February 2012	Vitaliy Gorelik	Russia	Frostbite	
6 August 2010	Fredrik Ericsson	Sweden	Fall from the Bottleneck	
17 July 2010	Petar Georgiev Unzhiev	Bulgaria	Altitude sickness	
23 June 2009	Michele Fait	Italy	Fall with skis	
2 August 2008	Hwang Dong-jin	South Korea	2008 K2 disaster	
2 August 2008	Park Kyeong-hyo	South Korea	2008 K2 disaster	
2 August 2008	Kim Hyo-gyung	South Korea	2008 K2 disaster	
2 August 2008	Pasang Bhote	Nepal	2008 K2 disaster	
2 August 2008	Jumic Bhote	Nepal	2008 K2 disaster	
2 August 2008	Gerard McDonnell	Ireland	Second or third serac fall	
2 August 2008	Meherban Karim	Pakistan	Second or third serac fall	
1/2 August 2008	Hugues d'Aubarède	France	Fall during descent	
1 August 2008	Rolf Bae	Norway	First serac fall	
1 August 2008	Jahan Baig	Pakistan	Fall while trying to recover Mandić's corpse	
1 August 2008	Dren Mandić	Serbia	Fall during ascent	
20 July 2007	Stefano Zavka	Italy	Unknown (disappeared)	
20 July 2007	Nima Nurbu	Nepal	Fall from the Bottleneck	
13 August 2006	Arkadi Kuvakin	Russia	Avalanche	
13 August 2006	Aleksandr Foigt	Russia	Avalanche	
13 August 2006	Petr Kuznetsov	Russia	Avalanche	
13 August 2006	Yuri Uteshev	Russia	Avalanche	
19 August 2004	Manel de la Matta Sastre	Spain	Peritonitis	
2 August 2004	Davoud Khadem Asl	Iran	Lost in storm, presumed dead	
2 August 2004	Sergei Sokolov	Russia	Lost in storm, presumed dead	
28 July 2004	Aleksandr Gubaev	Kyrgyzstan	Fall	
8 June 2004	Pae Kyong-kyu	South Korea	Avalanche	
8 June 2004	Kim Jae-koung	South Korea	Avalanche	
8 June 2004	Lee Hwa-hyeung	South Korea	Avalanche	
21 July 2003	Klaus-Dieter Grohs	Germany	Fall	
22 July 2002	Muhammad Iqbal	Pakistan	Fall	
13 July 2002	Sher Ajman	Pakistan	Avalanche	
22 July 2001	Park Young-do	South Korea	Fall	
10 July 1999	Mihai Cioroianu	Romania	Hit by rockfall	
14 August 1996	Igor Benkin	Russia	Exhaustion	
29 July 1996	Lorenzo Mazzoleni	Italy	Fall	
15 August 1995	Jeff Lakes	Canada	Exhaustion	
13 August 1995	Bruce Grant	New Zealand	1995 K2 disaster	
13 August 1995	Rob Slater	United States	1995 K2 disaster	
13 August 1995	Alison Hargreaves	United Kingdom	1995 K2 disaster	
13 August 1995	Javier Escartín	Spain	1995 K2 disaster	
13 August 1995	Javier Olivar	Spain	1995 K2 disaster	
13 August 1995	Lorenzo Ortiz	Spain	1995 K2 disaster	
6 July 1995	Jordi Anglès Soler	Spain	Fall	
11 August 1994	Juan Antonio "Atxo" Apellániz	Spain	HACE	
24 July 1994	Steve Untch	United States	Fall from broken rope while trying to assist injured Michael Groom off the mountain.	
10 July 1994	Dmitri Ibragim-Zade	Ukraine	Killed in a storm	
10 July 1994	Aleksandr Parkhomenko	Ukraine	Killed in a storm	
10 July 1994	Aleksei Kharaldin	Ukraine	Killed in a storm	
31 July 1993	Daniel Bidner	Sweden	Altitude sickness, fall	
30 July 1993	Reinmar Joswig	Germany	Fall	
30 July 1993	Peter Mezger	Germany	Fall	
7 July 1993	Dan Culver	Canada	Fall	
15 June 1993	Boštjan Kekec	Slovenia	Altitude sickness	
14 August 1992	Adrián Benítez	Mexico	Fall	
28 July 1989	Hans Bärnthaler	Austria	Avalanche	
24 August 1987	Suzuki Akira	Japan	Fall	
10 August 1986	Dobrosława Miodowicz-Wolf	Poland	Exhaustion	See also: 1986 K2 disaster
10 August 1986	Alfred Imitzer	Austria	Altitude sickness	See also: 1986 K2 disaster
10 August 1986	Hannes Wieser	Austria	Altitude sickness	See also: 1986 K2 disaster
10 August 1986	Alan Rouse	United Kingdom	Altitude sickness	See also: 1986 K2 disaster
7 August 1986	Julie Tullis	United Kingdom	Altitude sickness	
4 August 1986	Mohammad Ali	Pakistan	Stonefall	
3 August 1986	Wojciech Wróż	Poland	Fall	
16 July 1986	Renato Casarotto	Italy	Fall into crevasse on De Filippi glacier, approaching base camp	
10 July 1986	Tadeusz Piotrowski	Poland	Fall	
24 June 1986	Maurice Barrard	France	Disappeared, remains found in 1998 near Camp 1	
24 June 1986	Liliane Barrard	France	Disappeared, remains found 19 July 1986, near the South Face	
21 June 1986	John Smolich	United States	Avalanche	
21 June 1986	Alan Pennington	United States	Avalanche	
7 July 1985	Daniel Lacroix	France	Unknown (disappeared)	
15 August 1982	Yanagisawa Yukihiro	Japan	Fall	
30 July 1982	Halina Krüger-Syrokomska	Poland	Stroke	
19 August 1979	Laskhar Khan	Pakistan	Stroke	
9 June 1979	Ali, Son of Kazim	Pakistan	Fall into crevasse	
12 June 1978	Nick Estcourt	United Kingdom	Avalanche	
21 June 1954	Mario Puchoz	Italy	Pneumonia	
10 August 1953	Art Gilkey	United States	Avalanche	
31 July 1939	Pasang Kikuli	Nepal	Unknown (disappeared)	
31 July 1939	Pasang Kitar	Nepal	Unknown (disappeared)	
31 July 1939	Pintso	Nepal	Unknown (disappeared)	
30 July 1939	Dudley Wolfe	United States	Altitude sickness, severe dehydration	

=== Kangchenjunga ===
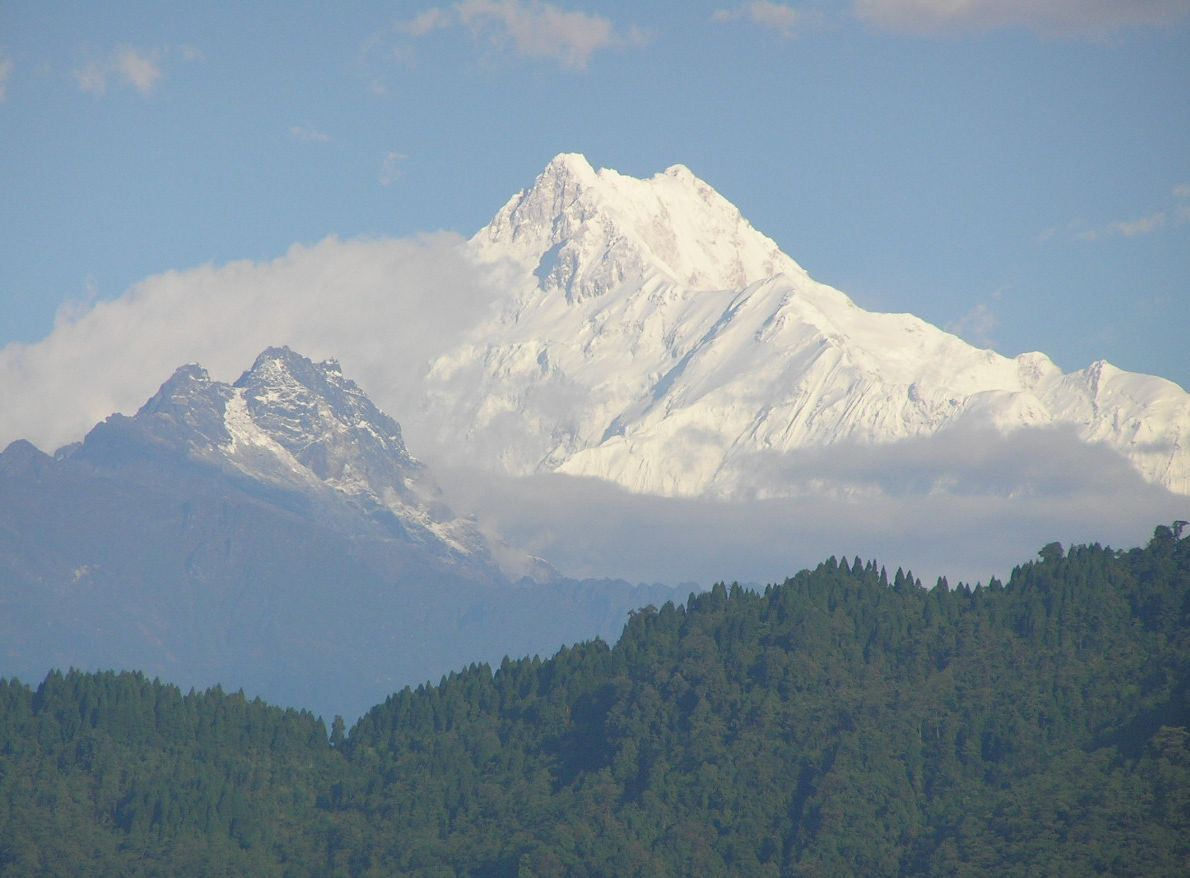
The summit of Kangchenjunga in the background.

Kangchenjunga is the third-highest mountain in the world. Its summit sits at 8,586 meters (28,169 ft) in a section of the Himalayas called the Kangchenjunga Himal. Because of its remote location in Nepal and the difficulty of accessing it from India, the Kangchenjunga region is not much explored by trekkers. Despite modern improvements to climbing gear, the fatality rate of summit attempts on Kanchenjunga is high. While there had been 532 successful summits as of May 2022, 52 climbers had lost their lives on the mountain. 10 more climbers had died on Yalung Kang (Kangchenjunga West), one of several satellite peaks in the massif, which features routes to the summit of Kangchenjunga.

List of deaths on Kangchenjunga
Date	Name	Nationality	Cause of death	References
10 May 2025	Margareta Morin	France	Fell ill and rescue could not be made	
25 May 2023	Luis Stitzinger	Germany	HAPE and HACE	
5 May 2022	Narayanan Iyer	India	Altitude sickness	
16 May 2019	Biplab Baidya	India	Exposure, frostbite	
16 May 2019	Kuntal Kanrar	India	Exposure, frostbite	
15 May 2019	Rodrigo Francisco Vivanco Figueroa	Chile	Unknown (disappeared)	
20 May 2014	Chhanda Gayen	India	Fall on descent above Camp 4 on Yalung Kang	
20 May 2014	Migma Temba Sherpa	Nepal	Fall on descent above Camp 4 on Yalung Kang	
20 May 2014	Dawa Wangchu Sherpa	Nepal	Fall on descent above Camp 4 on Yalung Kang	
20 May 2013	Bibas Gurung Sherpa	Nepal	Fall	
20 May 2013	Phu Dorchi Sherpa	Nepal	Fall	
20 May 2013	Park Nam-soo	South Korea	Fall	
20 May 2013	Péter Kiss	Hungary	Fall on descent above Camp 4	
20 May 2013	Zsolt Erőss	Hungary	Exhaustion	
24 May 2007	Íñigo de Pineda Blanc	Spain	Fall	
24 May 2002	Christopher Hugh "Chris" Grasswick	Canada	Fall	
23 April 2000	Ang Dawa Tamang	Nepal	Hit by ice block	
14 September 1999	Hyun Myeong-kun	South Korea	Avalanche	
14 September 1999	Han Do-kyu	South Korea	Avalanche	
16 May 1998	Shiina Atsushi	Japan	Altitude sickness	
16 May 1998	Akasaka Kenzo	Japan	Fall	
6 October 1995	Benoît Chamoux	France	Fall	
6 October 1995	Riku Sherpa	Nepal	Fall	
5 October 1995	Pierre Alain Royer	France	Fall	
Autumn 1995	Sukaraj Limbu	Nepal	Altitude sickness	
23 October 1994	Iordanka Ivanova Dimitrova	Bulgaria	Avalanche	
9 October 1994	Sergei Zhvirblya	Belarus	Avalanche	
9 October 1994	Ekaterina Ivanova	Russia	Avalanche	
13 May 1992	Wanda Rutkiewicz	Poland	Unknown (disappeared)	
25 April 1992	Ang Dorje Sherpa	Nepal	Suffocation	
25 April 1992	Lhakpa Nuru Sherpa	Nepal	Suffocation	
16 May 1991	Pasang Sherpa	India	Fall	
3 May 1991	Jože Rozman	Yugoslavia	Fall	
3 May 1991	Marija Frantar	Yugoslavia	Fall	
20 December 1989	Tchiring Chumbi Lama Sherpa	Nepal	Fall on Yalung Kang	
20 December 1989	Ang Dawa Sherpa	Nepal	Fall on Yalung Kang	
20 December 1989	Jin Kyo-sup	South Korea	Fall on Yalung Kang	
17 May 1988	Sanjay Borole	India	Exhaustion	
31 May 1987	Chander Singh	India	Fall	
25 May 1987	Choten Tsering	India	Fall	
25 May 1987	Phupu Bhotia	India	Fall	
25 May 1987	Phu Dorjee	India	Fall	
11 January 1986	Andrzej "Leszek" Czok	Poland	Altitude sickness	
22 April 1985	Borut Bergant	Yugoslavia	Fall on Yalung Kang	
15 January 1985	Chris Howard Chandler	United States	Altitude sickness	
15 October 1981	Jean-Jacques Ricouard	France	Fall	
4 May 1980	Alfonso Medina Rubio	Mexico	Fall on Yalung Kang	
4 May 1980	Sergio Hugo Saldaña Meneses	Mexico	Fall on Yalung Kang	
8 April 1977	Sukhvinder Singh	India	Fall	
15 May 1973	Matsuda Takao	Japan	Hit by rock after summitting Yalung Kang	
26 May 1955	Pemi Dorje Sherpa	India	Unknown illness	
9 August 1931	Hermann "Xaverl" Schaller	Germany	Avalanche	
9 August 1931	Pasang Sherpa	British Raj	Avalanche	
August 1931	Babu Lall	British Raj	Blackwater fever	
July 1931	Lobsang	British Raj	Unknown illness	
8 May 1930	Chettan Sherpa	British Raj	Avalanche	
27 May 1929	Edgar Francis Farmer	United States	Unknown (disappeared)	
1 September 1905	Unknown	British Raj	Fall	
1 September 1905	Unknown	British Raj	Fall	
1 September 1905	Unknown	British Raj	Fall	
1 September 1905	Alexis A. Pache	Switzerland	Fall	
28 August 1905	Unnamed porter	British Raj	Fall	

=== Lhotse ===
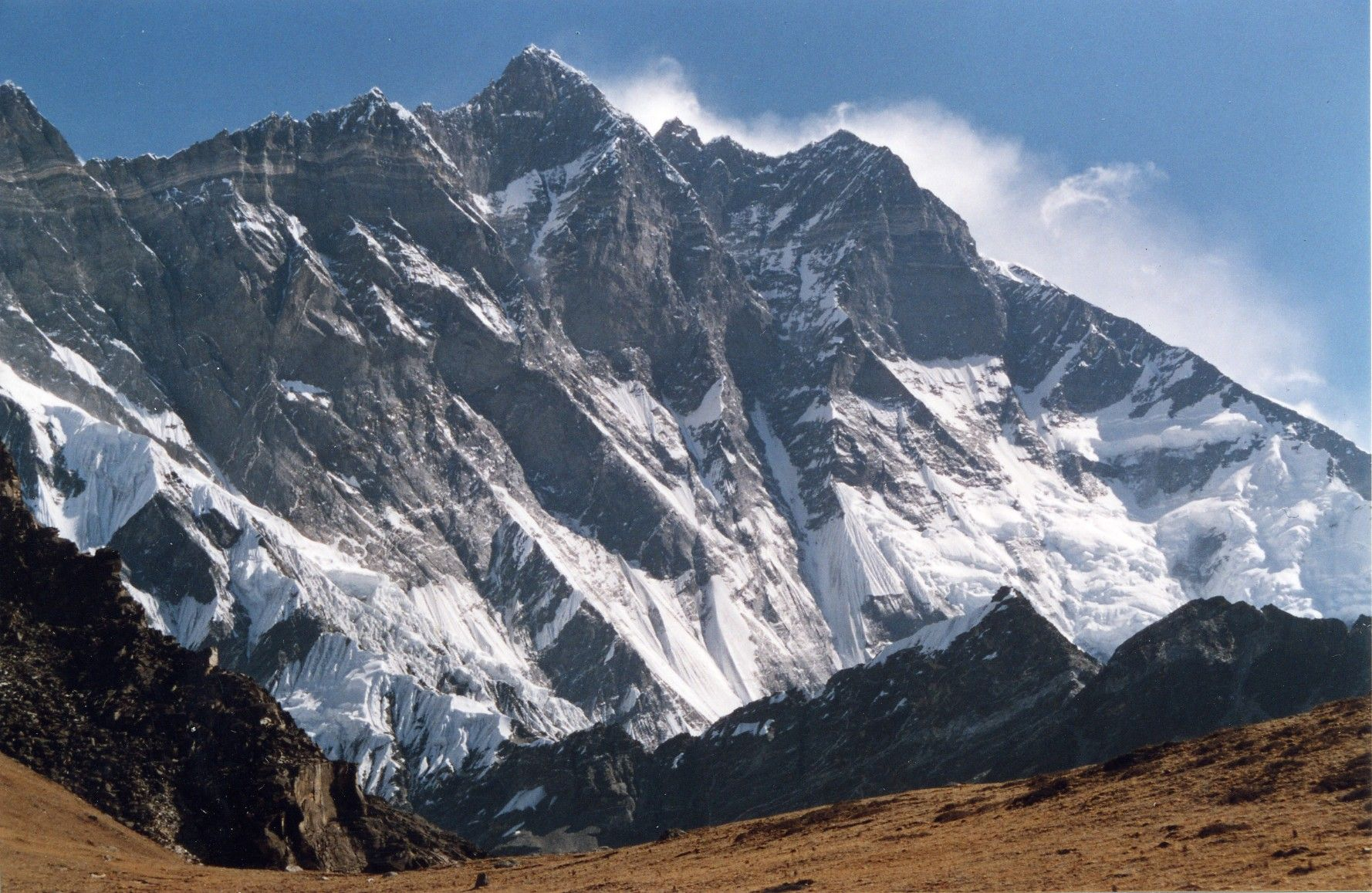
The south face of Lhotse, as seen from Chukhung Ri.

Standing at 8,516 meters (27,940 ft) above sea level, Lhotse is the fourth-highest mountain in the world. It is part of the Everest massif, and its standard climbing route follows the same path as Everest's South Col route up to the Yellow Band beyond Camp 3. After the Yellow Band, the routes diverge with climbers bound for Everest taking a left over the Geneva Spur up to the South Col, while Lhotse climbers take a right further up the Lhotse face. As of May 2022, there had been 1,089 successful summits and 22 deaths on Lhotse. A further 10 deaths had occurred on Lhotse Shar, a subsidiary mountain of Lhotse that offers a more difficult climb to Lhotse's peak than the standard route.

List of deaths on Lhotse
Date	Name	Nationality	Cause of death	References
18 May 2025	Barna Zsolt Vago	Romania	Unknown	
18 May 2025	Rakesh Kumar	India	Collapse on descent	
20 May 2024	Gabriel Viorel Tabara	Romania	Found dead in tent	
8 May 2022	Khudam Bir Tamang	Nepal	Avalanche on south face	
17 May 2019	Ivan Tomov	Bulgaria	HACE	
17 May 2018	Rustem Amirov	Russia	Altitude sickness	
19 May 2016	Ang Phurba Sherpa	Nepal	Fall	
27 April 2015	Yomagato Horoshi	Japan	2015 Mount Everest avalanche (died in Kathmandu of injuries)	
25 April 2015	Ge Zhen-fang	China	2015 Mount Everest avalanche	
18 April 2014	Asman Tamang	Nepal	2014 Mount Everest ice avalanche	
20 May 2013	Lee Hsiao-shih	Taiwan	Altitude sickness	
16 October 2012	Temba Sherpa	Nepal	Fall	
19 May 2012	Milan Sedláček	Czech Republic	Exposure, frostbite	
7 May 2010	Sergei Duganov	Russia	Altitude sickness	
25 May 2009	Sergei Samoilov	Kazakhstan	Fall	
21 May 2007	Pemba Doma Thaktopa Sherpa	Nepal	Fall	
9 May 2006	Pavel Kalný	Czech Republic	Fall	
5 October 2003	Hwang Sun-dug	South Korea	Avalanche on Lhotse Shar	
5 October 2003	Park Joo-hoon	South Korea	Avalanche on Lhotse Shar	
17 September 2000	Vladimir Bondarev	Russia	Avalanche	
27 May 1997	Vladimir Bachkirov	Russia	Altitude sickness	
24 October 1989	Jerzy Kukuczka	Poland	Fall	
27 September 1987	Antoni Sors i Ferrer	Spain	Avalanche on Lhotse Shar	
27 September 1987	Sergio Reinaldo Escalera Fernández	Spain	Avalanche on Lhotse Shar	
27 September 1987	Francisco Porras Cerda	Spain	Avalanche on Lhotse Shar	
27 September 1987	Antonio Quiñones Tores	Spain	Avalanche on Lhotse Shar	
15 September 1987	Czesław Jakiel	Poland	Avalanche	
30 October 1986	Pedro Alonso López	Spain	Fall on Lhotse Shar	
25 October 1985	Rafał Chołda	Poland	Fall	
25 October 1981	Josef Fauchere	Switzerland	Fall on Lhotse Shar	
16 October 1981	Philippe Petten	Switzerland	Fall on Lhotse Shar	
16 October 1981	Pierre Favez	Switzerland	Fall on Lhotse Shar	
17 May 1980	Pasang Nima Sherpa	Nepal	Avalanche	
28 April 1980	Nicolas Jaeger	France	Unknown (disappeared on Lhotse Shar)	
12 May 1977	Max Lutz	West Germany	Fall	
17 December 1974	Stanisław Latałło	Poland	Exhaustion	

=== Makalu ===
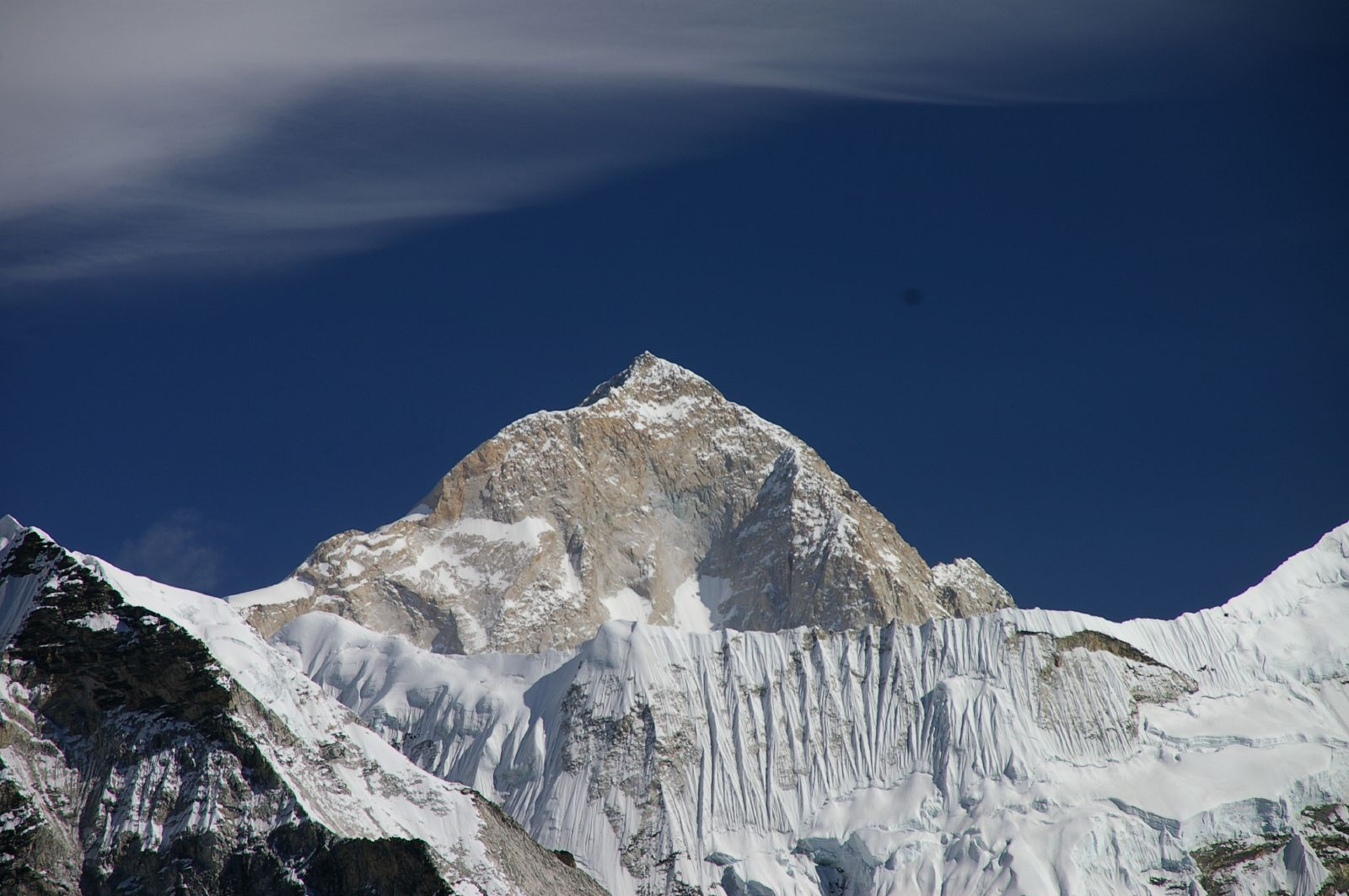
South-western vantage of the Makalu summit.

Makalu is the world's fifth-highest mountain at 8,481 meters (27,825 ft) above sea level. It is located in the Mahalangur Himalayas 19 kilometers (12 mi) southeast of Mount Everest on the China–Nepal border. As of December 2024, there had been 800 successful summits of Makalu and 50 deaths on the mountain.

List of deaths on Makalu
Date	Name	Nationality	Cause of death	References
9 May 2026	Shelley Johannesen	United States	Avalanche	
15 January 2026	Abolfazl Gozali	Iran	Went missing on descent	
15 January 2026	Phurba Ongel Sherpa	Nepal	Fall during descent	
5 May 2025	Alex Pancoe	United States	Cardiac arrest	
14 May 2024	Johnny Saliba	France	Altitude sickness	
7 May 2024	Lakpa Tenji Sherpa	Nepal	Exhaustion	
24 October 2021	Henrik T. Andersen	Denmark	Unknown (died near Base Camp; likely a trekker as no climbing permits were issued in autumn 2021)	
24 May 2019	Nima Tenji Sherpa	Nepal	Storm, altitude sickness	
16 May 2019	Dipankar Ghosh	India	Exhaustion	
16 May 2019	Narayan Singh	India	Exhaustion	
8 May 2019	Richard Leopoldo Hidalgo Jara	Peru	Died in sleep, likely altitude sickness	
15 May 2018	Ang Dawa Sherpa	Nepal	Unknown illness	
10 May 2016	Lakpa Ongyal Sherpa	Nepal	Unknown illness	
10 May 2016	Da Tenji Sherpa	Nepal	Unknown illness	
2 May 2014	Yannick Claude Sylvain Gagneret	France	HACE	
23 April 2013	Liu Xiang-yang	China	Fall during descent	
22 May 2011	Joëlle Catherine Brupbacher	Switzerland	Altitude sickness	
26 May 2010	Zaharias "Haris" Kiriakakis	Greece	Unknown (disappeared)	
1 May 2009	Sangat Ram Thakur	India	Fall	
20 May 2008	Nil Prasad Gurung	Nepal	Altitude sickness	
24 April 2008	Drabey Bahadur Rajan Magar	Nepal	Falling rock/ice	
27 January 2006	Jean-Christophe Lafaille	France	Fall into crevasse	
15 May 2005	Sumba Sherpa	Nepal	Altitude sickness	
18 May 2004	Jay Sieger	United States	Fall	
17 May 2004	Vladislav Terzyul	Ukraine	Unknown (disappeared)	
25 April 2002	Raymond David Caughron	United States	Exposure, frostbite	
Spring 2002	Pramod Sunar	Nepal	Unspecified	
Spring 2002	Karma Wangchu Sherpa	Nepal	Unspecified	
Spring 2002	Prakash Kundip Karki	Nepal	Unspecified	
Spring 2002	Ongchhu Sherpa	Nepal	Unspecified	
Spring 2002	Sarki Sherpa	Nepal	Unspecified	
Spring 2002	Nima Dorje Tamang	Nepal	Unspecified	
14 May 2001	Erich Resch	Austria	Fall	
16 May 2000	Bernd Mehnert	Germany	Altitude sickness	
11 October 1999	Sange Pemba Sherpa	Nepal	Fall	
30 April 1999	Michael Knakkergaard-Jørgensen	Denmark	Fall	
12 October 1997	Per Lyhne	Denmark	Unknown illness	
24 May 1997	Igor Bougatshevski	Russia	Falling rock/ice	
21 May 1997	Salavat Khabibulin	Russia	Exhaustion	
14 May 1996	Anatoli Chlekht	Russia	Fall	
8 May 1995	David Victor Hume	Australia	Fall	
8 October 1991	Ishizaka Takumi	Japan	Exposure, frostbite	
2 October 1991	Manu Badiola	Spain	Fall	
14 October 1988	Ryszard Kołakowski	Poland	Fall	
25 September 1986	Marcel Rüedi	Switzerland	Altitude sickness	
Autumn 1986	Kancha Gurung	Nepal	Altitude sickness	
13 September 1984	Ram Bahadur Shrestha	Nepal	Altitude sickness	
15 October 1983	Mark Peter Moorhead	Australia	Fall	
3 October 1983	Matthew William "Bill" Denz	New Zealand	Avalanche	
Spring 1983	Unknown	Nepal	Unknown	
26 September 1982	Tadeusz Szulc	Poland	Unknown illness	
6 October 1978	Andrzej Młynarczyk	Poland	Avalanche	
24 May 1976	Karel Schubert	Czechoslovakia	Exposure, frostbite	
21 May 1973	Jan Kounický	Czechoslovakia	Fall	
26 September 1954	Dilli Bahadur Verma	Nepal	Pneumonia	

=== Cho Oyu ===
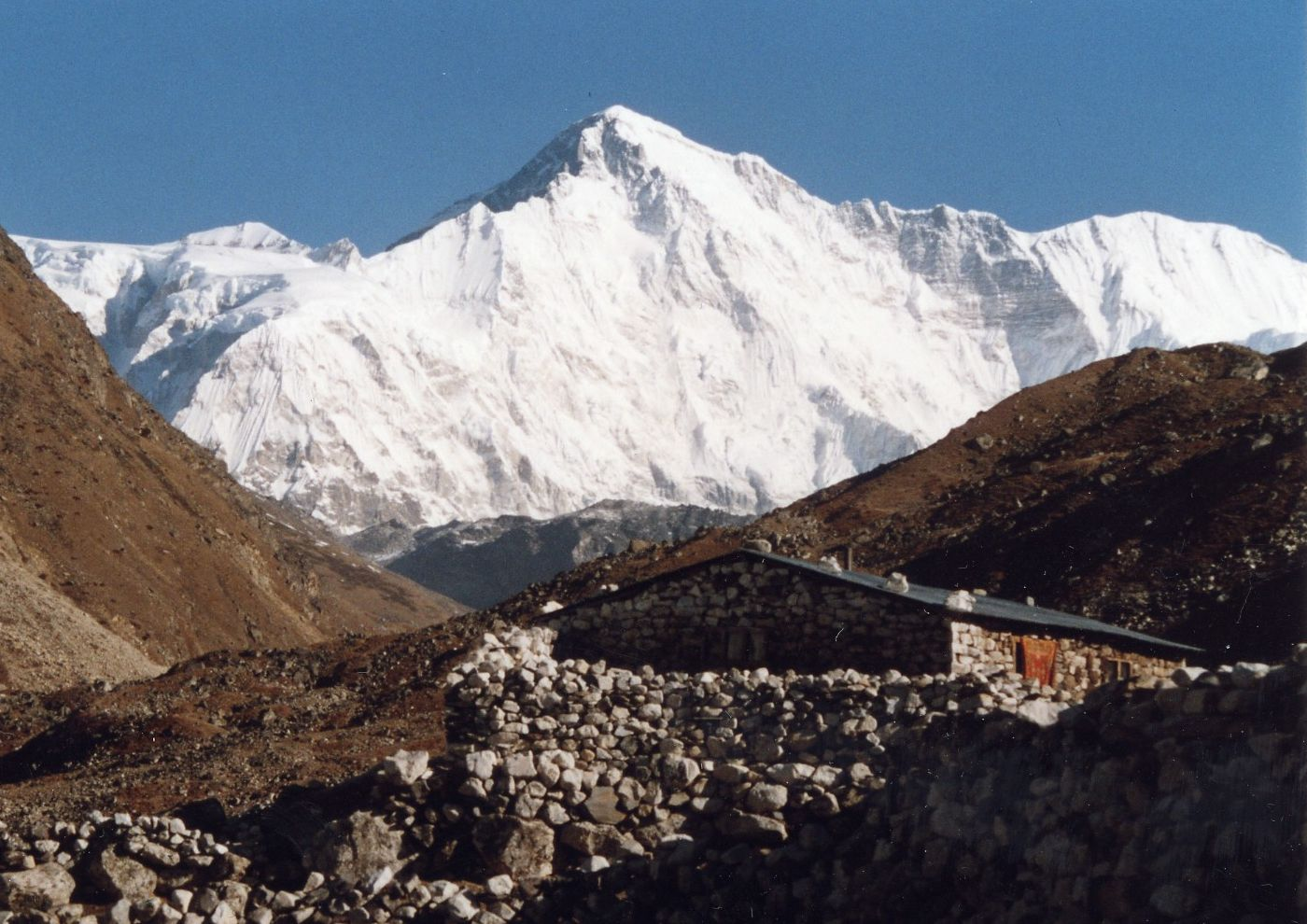
The summit of Cho Oyu, as seen from Gokyo.

Cho Oyu is the world's sixth-highest mountain at 8,188 meters (26,864 ft) above sea level. Standing on the China Tibet–Nepal Province No. 1 border, the mountain is the westernmost major peak of the Khumbu sub-section of the Mahalangur Himalaya 20 kilometers west of Mount Everest. Its standard northwest ridge route features generally moderate slopes, and it is close to Nangpa La, a glaciated pass that serves as the main trading route between the Tibetans and the Khumbu's Sherpas. For these reasons, Cho Oyu is considered the easiest 8,000-meter peak to climb. As of December 2024, there had been 4,027 successful summits and 52 deaths on the mountain.

List of deaths on Cho Oyu
Date	Name	Nationality	Cause of death	References
29 April 2019	Phujung Bhote	Nepal	Fall into crevasse	
16 May 2018	Park Shin-yong	South Korea	Exhaustion, altitude sickness	
26 September 2011	Joerg Henry Manuel Henning	Germany	Avalanche	
23 September 2011	Rostislav Krpec	Czech Republic	Unknown illness	
22 May 2011	Ronald Naar	Netherlands	Altitude sickness	
3 October 2010	Walter Nones	Italy	Fall	
3 May 2010	Serguey Nikitin	Russia	HACE	
26 September 2009	Clifton Harlan Wells "Cliff" Maloney	United States	Unknown illness	
2 June 2009	Dennis Verhoeve	Netherlands	Fall	
4 October 2008	Miha Valič	Slovenia	Altitude sickness	
3 October 2008	Guy Leveille	Canada	Fall	
9 May 2006	Raymund M. Spang	Germany	Fall	
11 May 2005	Lubos Stacho	Slovakia	Unknown illness	
13 October 2004	Xabier Ormazabal	Spain	Exhaustion, fall	
6 October 2003	Christos Barouchas	Greece	Exhaustion	
16 May 2003	Guenter Welkisch	Germany	Altitude sickness	
14 May 2003	Paul Bernard Carr	Australia	Heart attack	
14 May 2002	Adam Joseph Cinnamond	United Kingdom	Fall into crevasse	
30 April 2002	Chhong Ringee Sherpa	Nepal	Unknown	
9 September 2001	Kim Su-ya	South Korea	Altitude sickness	
11 October 2000	Pavle Milošević	Serbia	HAPE, heart problems	
20 September 2000	Pemba Gyalzen Sherpa	Nepal	Avalanche	
20 September 2000	Pasang Nuru Sherpa	Nepal	Avalanche	
20 September 2000	Pasang Nima Sherpa	Nepal	Avalanche	
4 May 2000	Pavel Bonadyssenko	Russia	Fall	
4 May 2000	Noora Toivonen	Finland	Fall	
Winter 1999	Joan Carrillo Junca	Spain	Fall	
26 September 1998	Alexander "Alex" Jaggi	Switzerland	Unknown illness	
13 May 1998	Gerald Roesner	Germany	Fall	
30 April 1998	Viktor Stepanov	Russia	Unknown illness	
10 October 1996	Lubos Becak	Czech Republic	Altitude sickness	
6 October 1996	Oya Hiroshi	Japan	Altitude sickness	
20 April 1996	Friedrich "Fritz" Zintl	Germany	Unknown illness	
8 October 1994	Lhakpa Gyalu Sherpa	Nepal	Unknown illness	
24 January 1994	Juan Carlos Piedra	Switzerland	Fall	
24 January 1994	Jean-Luc Beausire	Switzerland	Fall	
20 May 1992	Philippe Gerard Arnold Monnerat	Switzerland	Fall	
21 October 1991	Yuri Grebeniuk	Soviet Union	Falling rock/ice	
11 May 1991	Horst Wasmann	Germany	Fall	
Summer 1990	Chandra Gurung	Nepal	Unknown illness	
25 December 1989	Ang Lhakpa Nuru Sherpa	Nepal	Fall	
29 September 1988	Daniel Bovero	France	Altitude sickness	
12 May 1988	Stefan Wörner	Switzerland	Altitude sickness	
23 October 1986	Pierre-Alain Steiner	Switzerland	Fall	
19 May 1982	Reinhard Karl	West Germany	Avalanche	
7 May 1964	Alois Thurmayr	West Germany	Altitude sickness	
4 May 1964	Georg Huber	West Germany	Altitude sickness	
2 October 1959	Chhowang Sherpa	Nepal	Avalanche	
2 October 1959	Ang Norbu Sherpa	Nepal	Avalanche	
2 October 1959	Claudine van der Straten-Ponthoz	Belgium	Avalanche	
2 October 1959	Claude Kogan	France	Avalanche	
28 April 1958	Narendra Dhar "Nandu" Jayal	India	Altitude sickness	

=== Dhaulagiri I ===
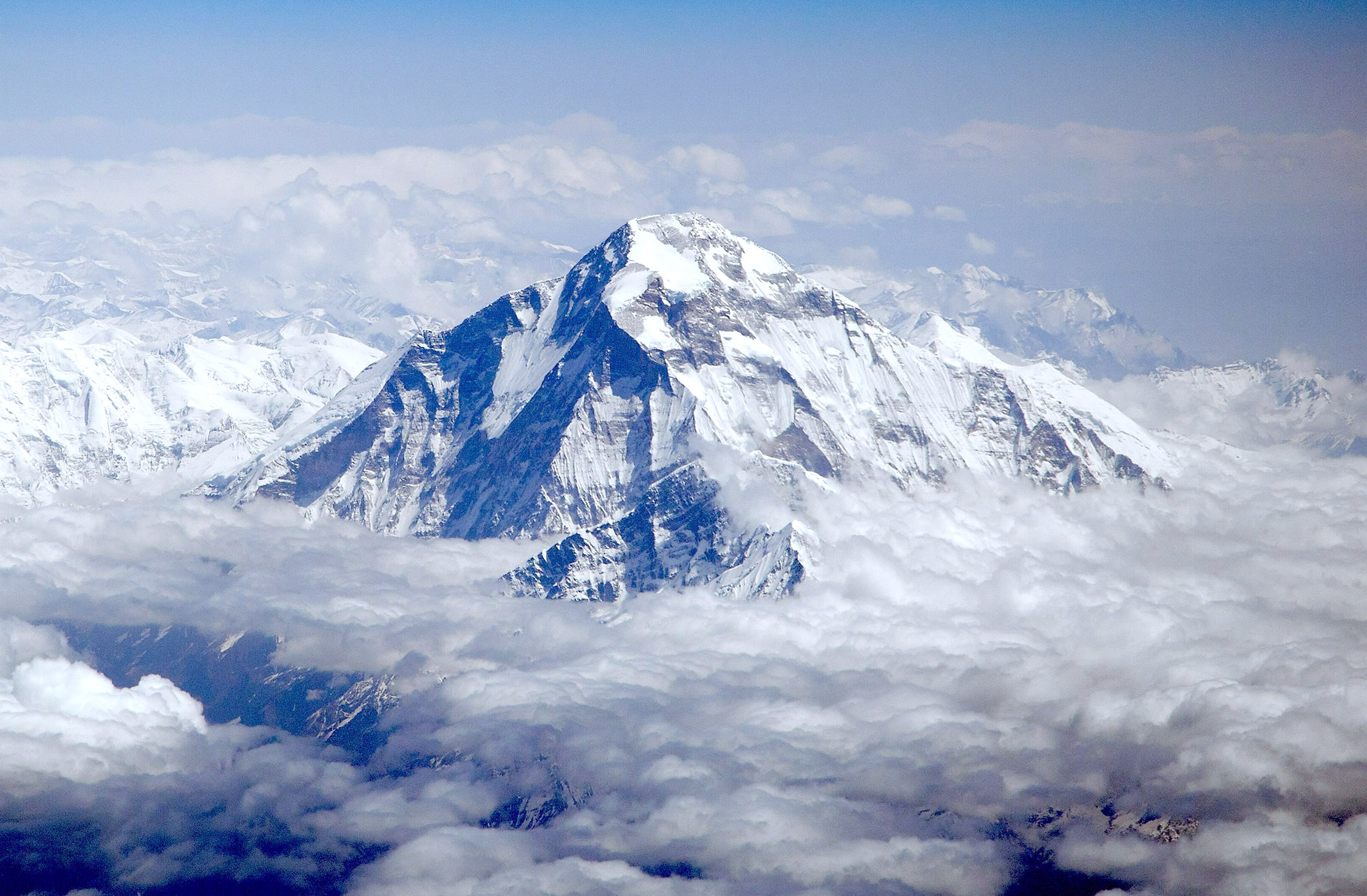
The summit of Dhaulagiri I.

Dhaulagiri I is the world's seventh highest mountain. There had been 691 successful ascents since the first in 1960. 87 people are known to have lost their lives on the slopes of Dhaulagiri I.

List of deaths on Dhaulagiri I
Date	Name	Nationality	Cause of death	References
6–8 October 2024 (Note: The climbers went missing on 6 October, and their bodies were found two days later. The precise date of death is unknown.)	Alexandr Dusheyko	Russia	Fall	
6–8 October 2024	Oleg Kruglov	Russia	Fall	
6–8 October 2024	Vladimir Chistikov	Russia	Fall	
6–8 October 2024	Mihail Nosenko	Russia	Fall	
6–8 October 2024	Dmitriy Shpilevoy	Russia	Fall	
14 October 2023	Nadezhda Oleneva	Russia	Fall	
6 October 2022	Ram Bahadur Tamang	Nepal	Unknown	
12 April 2022	Antonios Sykaris	Greece	Illness	
27 September 2018	Dawa Gyaljen Sherpa	Nepal	Avalanche	
30 April 2018	Simone La Terra	Italy	Storm	
20 May 2017	Ang Ngima Sherpa	Nepal	Fall/Exposure	
19 May 2016	Rajib Bhattacharya	India	Altitude sickness	
16 May 2016	Christiaan Johan Wilson	Netherlands	Disappeared	
15 October 2014	Ján Matlák	Slovakia	Avalanche	
15 October 2014	Vladimír Švancár	Slovakia	Avalanche	
15 October 2014	Bhoj Kumar Rai	Nepal	Avalanche	
15 October 2014	Gopal Rai	Nepal	Avalanche	
15 October 2014	Dorje Sherpa	Nepal	Avalanche	
26 May 2013	Juanjo Garra	Spain	Fall and exposure	
23 May 2013	Chizuko Kono	Japan	Exhaustion	
23 May 2013	Dawa Sherpa	Nepal	Disappeared	
28 September 2010	Daisuke Honda	Japan	Avalanche	
28 September 2010	Osamu Tanabe	Japan	Avalanche	
28 September 2010	Pasang Gyelu	Nepal	Avalanche	
28 September 2010	Toshio Yamamoto	Japan	Avalanche	
13 May 2010	Zhao Liang	China	Fall	
13 May 2010	Li Bin	China	Cold/ Exhaustion	
13 May 2010	Han Xin	China	Fall	
1 May 2009	Mehdi Etemad Far	Iran	Fall	
8 April 2009	Piotr Morawski	Poland	Fall into crevasse	
5 May 2008	Rafael Guillén	Spain	Fall	
5 May 2008	Darío Bracali	Argentina	Disappeared	
12 May 2007	Santiago Sagaste	Spain	Avalanche	
12 May 2007	Ricardo Valencia	Spain	Avalanche	
30 April 2007	Sergio Dalla Longa	Italy	Fall	
May 2004	Jože Šepič	Slovenia	Fall	
14 October 2001	Yukihiko Shinagawa	Japan	Disappeared	
14 October 2001	Ryushi Hoshino	Japan	Disappeared	
14 October 2001	Masashi Fukumoto	Japan	Disappeared	
14 October 2001	José Antonio Garcés	Spain	Fall	
7 October 2000	Gyalzen Chuldim	Nepal	Avalanche	
29 September 2000	Soo-ho Lee	South Korea	Avalanche	
24 October 1999	Ginette Harrison	United Kingdom	Avalanche	
24 October 1999	Dawa Dorje	Nepal	Avalanche	
2 October 1998	Charalampos (Babis) Tsoupras	Greece	Fall	
11 May 1998	Chantal Mauduit	France	Avalanche	
11 May 1998	Ang Tshering	Nepal	Avalanche	
1 May 1998	Nikos Papandreou	Greece	Fall	
6 October 1995	Isayoshi Tawaraya	Japan	Disappeared	
19 May 1995	Albrecht Hammann	Germany	Altitude Sickness	
18 October 1994	Galina Chekanova	Ukraine	Fall	
26 September 1994	Robert Bähler	Switzerland	Fall	
6 October 1993	Gary Ball	New Zealand	Altitude Sickness	
11 May 1992	Sanda Dumitrescu-Isaila	Romania	Disappeared	
11 May 1992	Taina Coliban	Romania	Disappeared	
2 May 1992	Hubert Weinzierl	Germany	Heart Failure	
31 October 1990	Dainius Makauskas	Lithuania	Disappeared	
29 April 1990	Wangel	Nepal	Avalanche	
25 December 1989	Scot McGrath	United States	Avalanche	
25 December 1989	Gregory Barber	United States	Avalanche	
25 December 1989	Wangchuk Nuru	Nepal	Avalanche	
10 October 1989	Francesc (Quico) Dalmases	Spain	Disappeared	
25 September 1989	Sarki Kami	Nepal	Avalanche	
25 September 1989	Ajiba	Nepal	Avalanche	
21 September 1986	Franz Mülleder	Austria	Edema	
23 October 1984	Jan Simon	Czechoslovakia	Fall	
23 May 1981	Mario Serrano	Argentina	Fall	
7 October 1980	Lynette R. Griffith	Australia	Avalanche	
14 May 1979	Sherpa Pemba	Nepal	Disappeared	
13 May 1979	Jean-Louis Sabarly	France	Avalanche	
13 May 1979	Eric Poumailloux	France	Avalanche	
20 October 1978	Katsuyoshi Kogure	Japan	Fall/Exposure	
23 September 1978	Kiyoshi Kobayashi	Japan	Avalanche	
23 September 1978	Yujiro Fukasawa	Japan	Avalanche	
23 September 1978	Hiroshi Akuzawa	Japan	Avalanche	
21 April 1978	Katsumi Naganuma	Japan	Exhaustion	
26 March 1975	Yoshitada Numao	Japan	Avalanche	
26 March 1975	Tetsu Imura	Japan	Avalanche	
26 March 1975	Pasang Kami	Nepal	Avalanche	
26 March 1975	Dorje	Nepal	Avalanche	
26 March 1975	Dakiya	Nepal	Avalanche	
28 April 1969	David Seidman	United States	Avalanche	
28 April 1969	Ross William	United States	Avalanche	
28 April 1969	Vincent Hoeman	United States	Avalanche	
28 April 1969	Paul Gerhard	United States	Avalanche	
28 April 1969	Boyd Everett	United States	Avalanche	
28 April 1969	Pemba Phutar	Nepal	Avalanche	
28 April 1969	Tenzing	Nepal	Avalanche	
29 April 1959	Heinrich Roiss	Austria	Fall	
26 May 1956	Bal Bahadur	Nepal	Avalanche	
30 June 1954	Francisco (Paco) Ibáñez	Argentina	Pneumonia/Infection	

=== Manaslu ===
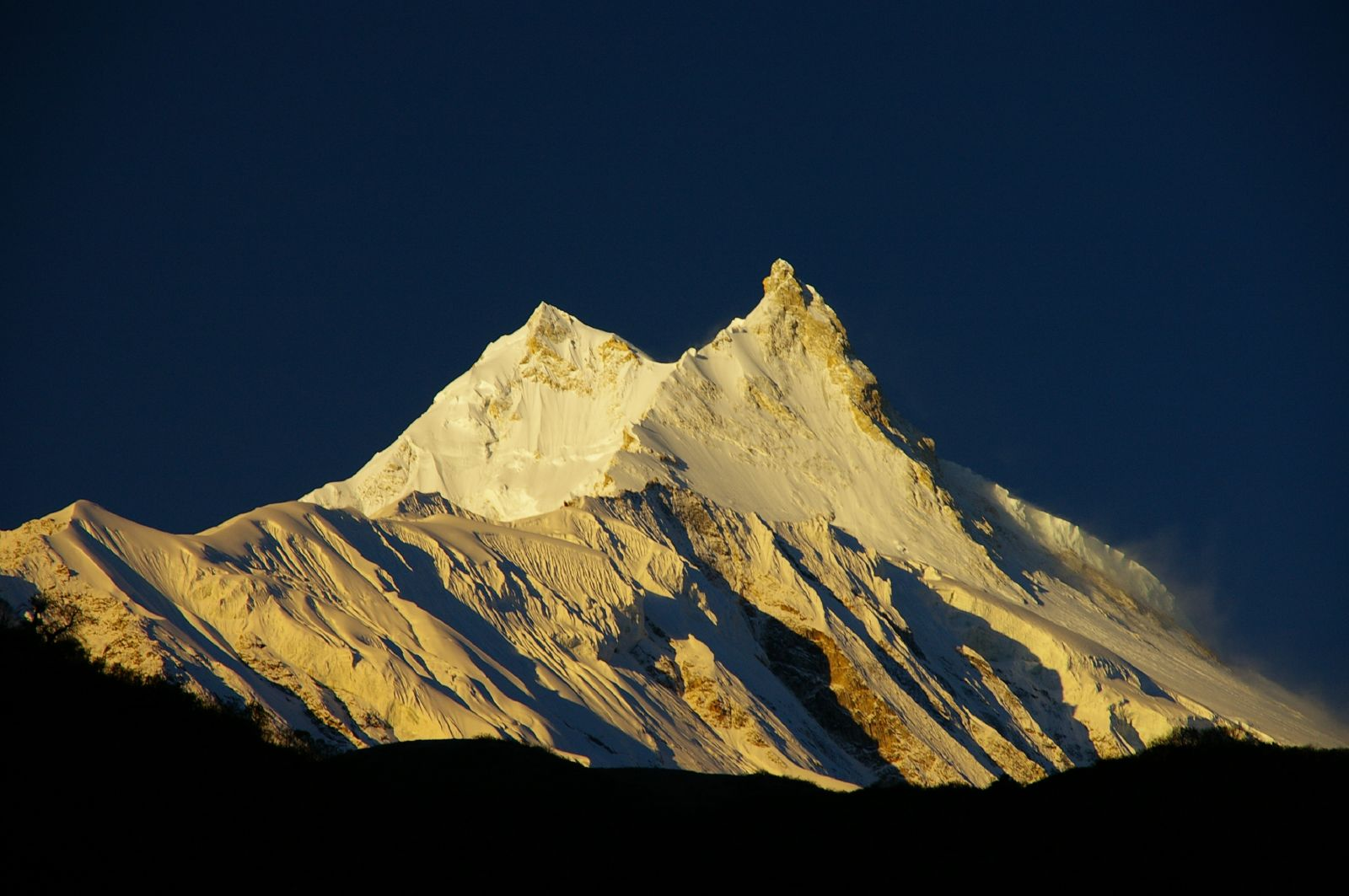
The summit of Manaslu at dawn

Manaslu is the world's eighth highest mountain. While the peak was known to the local population, foreign visitors became aware of its existence in 1950. During the next five years Japanese expeditions were exploring the area and in 1956 Toshio Imanishi and Gyalzen Norbu successfully climbed the mountain. Due to tensions between climbers and inhabitants, for the next two decades visits to Manaslu were sporadic, lasting until the 1970s. As of December 2024 there are a total of 3,317 successful summits, with 90 people dying on the mountain.

List of deaths on Manaslu
Date	Name	Nationality	Cause of death	References
20 September 2026	Dhruba Jyoti Guha	India	Avalanche	
20 September 2026	Phursemba Sherpa	Nepal	Avalanche	
17 September 2026	Lau Wee Sang	Singapore	Heart Attack	
2 October 2022	Dawa Chhiring Sherpa	Nepal	Avalanche	
26 September 2022	Hilaree Nelson	United States	Fall	
26 September 2022	Anup Rai	Nepal	Avalanche	
26 September 2022	Brent Seal	Canada	Stroke	
28 September 2019	Rita Donata Bladyko	Poland	Altitude sickness	
29 September 2018	Roman Hlávko	Czech Republic	Probably fall	
8 September 2018	Hiromi Komatsu	Japan	Rescue helicopter crash	
25 September 2017	Philip Harvey	United Kingdom	Altitude Sickness	
26 October 2016	Hirotaka Onodera	Japan	Fall	
1 October 2015	Zoltan Benedek	Austria	Probably altitude sickness	
26 September 2014	Yoshimasa Sasaki	Japan	Fall	
4 October 2012	Victor Correa	Colombia	Unknown (disappeared)	
23 September 2012	Dominique Ouimet	Canada	Avalanche	
23 September 2012	Gregory Ugo Costa	France	Avalanche	
23 September 2012	Alberto Magliano	Italy	Avalanche	
23 September 2012	Catherine Marie Andree Ricard	France	Avalanche	
23 September 2012	Christian Mittermeyer	Germany	Avalanche	
23 September 2012	Dawa Dorji Sherpa	Nepal	Avalanche	
23 September 2012	Fabrice Priez	France	Avalanche	
23 September 2012	Ludovic Challeat	France	Avalanche	
23 September 2012	Marti Gasull i Roig	Catalonia	Avalanche	
23 September 2012	Phillippe Lucien Bos	France	Avalanche	
23 September 2012	Rémy Lécluse	France	Avalanche	
11 May 2012	Jafar Naseri	Iran	Unknown (disappeared)	
12 May 2011	Tashi Chhiring	Nepal	Unknown (disappeared)	
12 May 2011	Bernard Jean Francois Milian	France	Unknown (disappeared)	
12 May 2011	Alain Pierre Marie Laurens	France	Unknown (disappeared)	
29 April 2011	Eisa Mir-Shekari	Iran	Altitude sickness	
24 September 2010	Nobuaki Kuwabara	Japan	Illness	
24 April 2010	Chi-won Yun	South Korea	Unknown (disappeared)	
24 April 2010	Haeng-su Park	South Korea	Exhaustion	
3 October 2009	Franc Oderlap	Slovenia	Hit by falling seracs, died in hospital	
19 May 2009	Levente Szabó	Hungary	Fall	
28 April 2009	Giuseppe Antonelli	Italy	Illness	
5 October 2008	Daniel Goulevitch	France	Altitude sickness	
13 May 2008	Hasta Bahadur Gurung	Nepal	Illness	
28 May 2006	Susan Erica Fear	Australia	Fall in crevasse	
13 October 2001	Isao Kuribara	Nepal	Altitude sickness, Exhaustion	
30 October 1998	Hristo Stantchev	Bulgaria	Fall	
26 October 1998	Lenin Granados	Colombia	Avalanche	
9 October 1997	Miroslav Rybansky	Slovakia	Collapsed	
8 October 1997	Juraj Kardhordo	Slovakia	Unknown (disappeared)	
1 October 1996	Masatsugu Konishi	Japan	Unknown (disappeared)	
7 May 1995	Michael Zunk	Germany	Fall	
6 May 1995	Jörg Starke	Germany	Fall	
22 October 1993	Sergei Jadrychnikov	Russia	Avalanche	
21 October 1993	Igor Khmiliar	Russia	Fall	
3 October 1992	Sven Vermeiren	Belgium	Fall	
2 October 1992	Sylwia Dmowska	Poland	Fall	
10 May 1991	Karl Großrubatscher	Italy	Fall	
10 May 1991	Friedl Mutschlechner	Italy	Lightning	
7 September 1990	Murat Galiev	Soviet Union	Fall	
7 September 1990	Zinur Halitov	Soviet Union	Fall	
7 September 1990	Grigory Lunjakov	Soviet Union	Fall	
27 March 1990	Nima Wangchuk Sherpa	Nepal	Avalanche	
27 March 1990	Charles "Chuck" Schertz	United States	Avalanche	
27 March 1990	Nancy Jackson	United States	Avalanche	
7 May 1989	Santiago Suárez	Spain	Fall	
28 October 1987	Ichigi Kudo	Japan	Fall	
4 May 1986	Dieter Oberbichler	Austria	Fall	
3 May 1986	Wilhelm Klaiber	West Germany	Unknown (disappeared)	
25 October 1985	Nima Norbu Sherpa	Nepal	Avalanche	
4 May 1985	Thomas Juen	Austria	Avalanche	
11 December 1983	Stanisław Jaworski	Poland	Fall	
24 April 1983	Ante Bućan	Yugoslavia	Avalanche	
24 April 1983	Nejc Zaplotnik	Yugoslavia	Avalanche	
18 December 1982	Takashi Sakuma	Japan	Cold, Exhaustion	
10 May 1982	Pere Aymerich	Spain	Avalanche	
10 May 1982	Enric Font Lloret	Spain	Avalanche	
8 October 1979	Edgardo Jose Porsellana	Argentina	Avalanche	
5 May 1974	Teiko Suzuki	Japan	Unknown (disappeared)	
26 April 1972	Andi Schlick	Austria	Unknown (disappeared)	
25 April 1972	Franz Jäger	Austria	Unknown (disappeared)	
10 April 1972	Wangel	Nepal	Avalanche	
10 April 1972	Rinsing Ongyal	Nepal	Avalanche	
10 April 1972	Phurba Tenzing	Nepal	Avalanche	
10 April 1972	Pemba Rinji (Nawang Chultim)	Nepal	Avalanche	
10 April 1972	Pasang Nima	Nepal	Avalanche	
10 April 1972	Gyalze	Nepal	Avalanche	
10 April 1972	Ang Tendi (Ang Dawa)	Nepal	Avalanche	
10 April 1972	Ang Rita	Nepal	Avalanche	
10 April 1972	Ang Mingma (b)	Nepal	Avalanche	
10 April 1972	Ang Mingma (a)	Nepal	Avalanche	
10 April 1972	Kazunari Yasuhisha	Japan	Avalanche	
10 April 1972	Chang-hee Park	South Korea	Avalanche	
10 April 1972	Sae-keon Oh	South Korea	Avalanche	
10 April 1972	Joon-haeng Song	South Korea	Avalanche	
10 April 1972	Ho-sup Kim	South Korea	Avalanche	
4 May 1971	Ki-sup Kim	South Korea	Fall	

=== Nanga Parbat ===
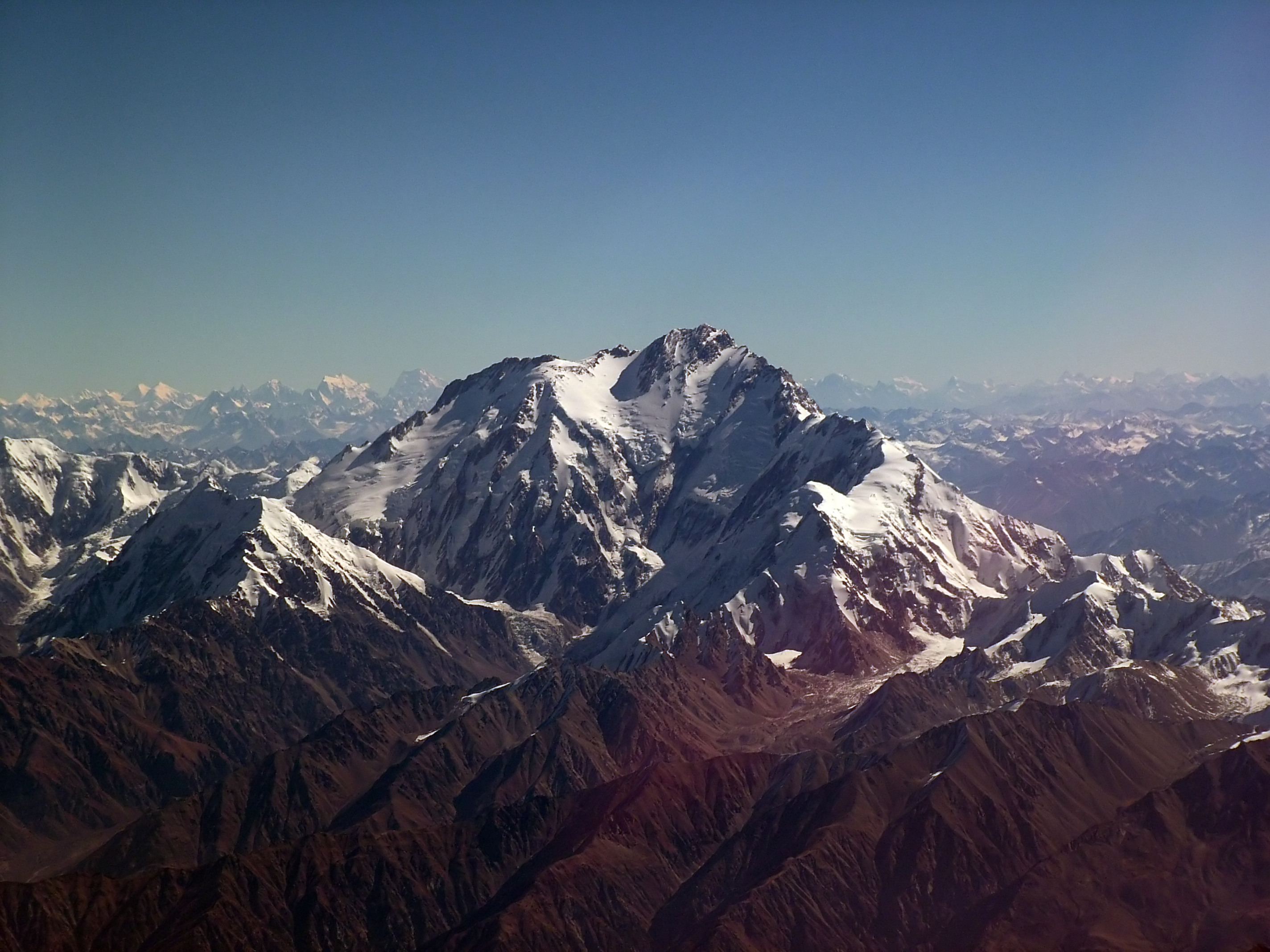
The summit of Nanga Parbat, as seen from the air.

Nanga Parbat is the world's ninth highest mountain and is known for being extremely hard to climb: it was named the "Killer Mountain" by the 1953 German expedition, the first to successfully reach the peak. In addition to the large number of climbing deaths, 11 mountaineers were killed by the Taliban in 2013.

List of deaths on Nanga Parbat
Date	Name	Nationality	Cause of death	References
3 July 2025	Klára Kolouchová	Czech Republic	Fall	
3 July 2023	Paweł Kopeć	Poland	Altitude sickness	
24 February - 7 March 2019 (Note: The last communication with these two climbers was made on 24 February, their bodies were discovered on 7 March and identified on 9 March. The precise date of death is unknown.)	Daniele Nardi	Italy	Unknown	
24 February - 7 March 2019	Tom Ballard	United Kingdom	Unknown	
27/28 January 2018	Tomasz Mackiewicz	Poland	Altitude sickness	
24 June 2017	Alberto Zerain	Spain	Avalanche	
24 June 2017	Mariano Galván	Argentina	Avalanche	
22 June 2013	Igor Svergun	Ukraine	Killed by Taliban at Diamir Base Camp	
22 June 2013	Badawi Kashaev	Ukraine	Killed by Taliban at Diamir Base Camp	
22 June 2013	Dmitry Konyaev	Ukraine	Killed by Taliban at Diamir Base Camp	
22 June 2013	Rao Jianfeng	China	Killed by Taliban at Diamir Base Camp	
22 June 2013	Yang Chunfeng	China	Killed by Taliban at Diamir Base Camp	
22 June 2013	Honglu Chen	China (Note: USA/China dual national)	Killed by Taliban at Diamir Base Camp	
22 June 2013	Sona Sherpa	Nepal	Killed by Taliban at Diamir Base Camp	
22 June 2013	Ernestas Markšaitis	Lithuania	Killed by Taliban at Diamir Base Camp	
22 June 2013	Ali Hussain	Pakistan	Killed by Taliban at Diamir Base Camp	
22 June 2013	Anton Dobes	Slovakia	Killed by Taliban at Diamir Base Camp	
22 June 2013	Peter Šperka	Slovakia	Killed by Taliban at Diamir Base Camp	
6 February 2013	Joel Wischnewski	France	Avalanche	
11 July 2009	Mi-young Go	South Korea	Fall	
10 July 2009	Wolfgang Kölblinger	Austria	Fall	
17 July 2008	Saman Nemati	Iran	Unknown	
15 July 2008	Karl Unterkircher	Italy	Fell into crevasse	
28 July 2006	Naohiro Ozawa	Japan	Unknown	
22 July 2006	José Antonio Delgado	Venezuela	Exposure	
1 July 2004	Günter Jung	Germany	Fall	
26 July 1998	Hideki Ohmiya	Japan	Fall	
30 July 1997	Joan Colet	Spain	Fell during descent	
20 June 1996	Răzvan Petcu	Romania	Avalanche	
20 June 1996	Gabriel Stana	Romania	Avalanche	
24 June 1994	Antonio López	Spain	Fall	
7 July 1993	Chun-moon Ahn	South Korea	Unknown	
18 August 1990	Osami Nakajima	Japan	Fall	
3 July 1990	Chang-gi Park	South Korea	Fall into a crevasse	
18 July 1989	Tetsuya Baba	Japan	Lightning strike	
23 June 1989	Kwang-ho Kim	South Korea	Fall	
10 July 1985	Piotr Kalmus	Poland	Avalanche	
8 December 1984	Hiromi Kameda	Japan	Fall	
7 July 1984	Fuji Tsunoda	Japan	Avalanche	
7 July 1984	Shigeoh Hida	Japan	Avalanche	
7 July 1984	Nobuyuki Imakyurei	Japan	Avalanche	
7 July 1984	Takashi Kogure	Japan	Avalanche	
12 July 1983	Nobuyoshi Yamada	Japan	Avalanche	
12 July 1983	Yuichiro Takamori	Japan	Avalanche	
12 July 1983	Satoshi Iida	Japan	Avalanche	
17 June 1983	Kazuo Shimura	Japan	Fall	
8 June 1982	Peter Hiltbrand	Switzerland	Altitude sickness	
12 June 1982	Ali Sheikh	Pakistan	Fall	
4 June 1982	Peter Forrer	Switzerland	Avalanche	
28 April 1982	Matloob Hassan Nuri	Pakistan	Fall into crevasse	
31 July 1977	Robert Broughton	United States	Avalanche	
31 July 1977	George Bogel	United States	Avalanche	
26 September 1976	Sebastian (Wastl) Arnold	Austria	Fall	
8 July 1971	Näbi Mantas Hunza	Pakistan	Fall	
29 June 1970	Günther Messner	Italy	Avalanche	
23 June 1962	Siegfried Löw	West Germany	Fall	
4 December 1950	John W. Thornley	United Kingdom	Unknown	
4 December 1950	William H. Crace	United Kingdom	Unknown	
14/15 June 1937	Karl Wien	Nazi Germany	Avalanche, 1937 Nanga Parbat tragedy	
14/15 June 1937	Martin Pfeffer	Nazi Germany	Avalanche, 1937 Nanga Parbat tragedy	
14/15 June 1937	Peter Müllritter	Nazi Germany	Avalanche, 1937 Nanga Parbat tragedy	
14/15 June 1937	Günther Hepp	Nazi Germany	Avalanche, 1937 Nanga Parbat tragedy	
14/15 June 1937	Hans Hartmann	Nazi Germany	Avalanche, 1937 Nanga Parbat tragedy	
14/15 June 1937	Adolf Göttner	Nazi Germany	Avalanche, 1937 Nanga Parbat tragedy	
14/15 June 1937	Pert Fankhauser	Austria	Avalanche, 1937 Nanga Parbat tragedy	
14/15 June 1937	Tigmay	British Raj	Avalanche, 1937 Nanga Parbat tragedy	
14/15 June 1937	Pasang Norbu	British Raj	Avalanche, 1937 Nanga Parbat tragedy	
14/15 June 1937	Nima Tsering I	British Raj	Avalanche, 1937 Nanga Parbat tragedy	
14/15 June 1937	Nima Tsering II	British Raj	Avalanche, 1937 Nanga Parbat tragedy	
14/15 June 1937	Mingma Tsering	British Raj	Avalanche, 1937 Nanga Parbat tragedy	
14/15 June 1937	Karmi	British Raj	Avalanche, 1937 Nanga Parbat tragedy	
14/15 June 1937	Gyalgen Monjo	British Raj	Avalanche, 1937 Nanga Parbat tragedy	
14/15 June 1937	Chong Karma	British Raj	Avalanche, 1937 Nanga Parbat tragedy	
14/15 June 1937	Ang Tshering II	British Raj	Avalanche, 1937 Nanga Parbat tragedy	
17 July 1934	Willy Merkl	Nazi Germany	Unknown	
17 July 1934	Sherpa Gyali	British Raj	Unknown	
12 July 1934	Willo Welzenbach	Nazi Germany	Exposure	
10 July 1934	Sherpa Dakshi	British Raj	Unknown	
10 July 1934	Dorje Nima	British Raj	Exposure	
10 July 1934	Nima Tashi	British Raj	Exposure	
10 July 1934	Pinju Norbu	British Raj	Exposure	
9 July 1934	Nima Nurbu	British Raj	Unknown	
9 July 1934	Ulrich Wieland	Nazi Germany	Unknown	
8 June 1934	Alfred Drexel	Nazi Germany	Pneumonia, HACE	
24 August 1895	Albert F. Mummery	United Kingdom	Avalanche	
24 August 1895	Ragobir Thapa Ghurka	Nepal	Avalanche	
24 August 1895	Goman Singh Ghurka	Nepal	Avalanche	

=== Annapurna I ===
Photograph of Annapurna South from Annapurna base camp (4,130 m) before sunrise.

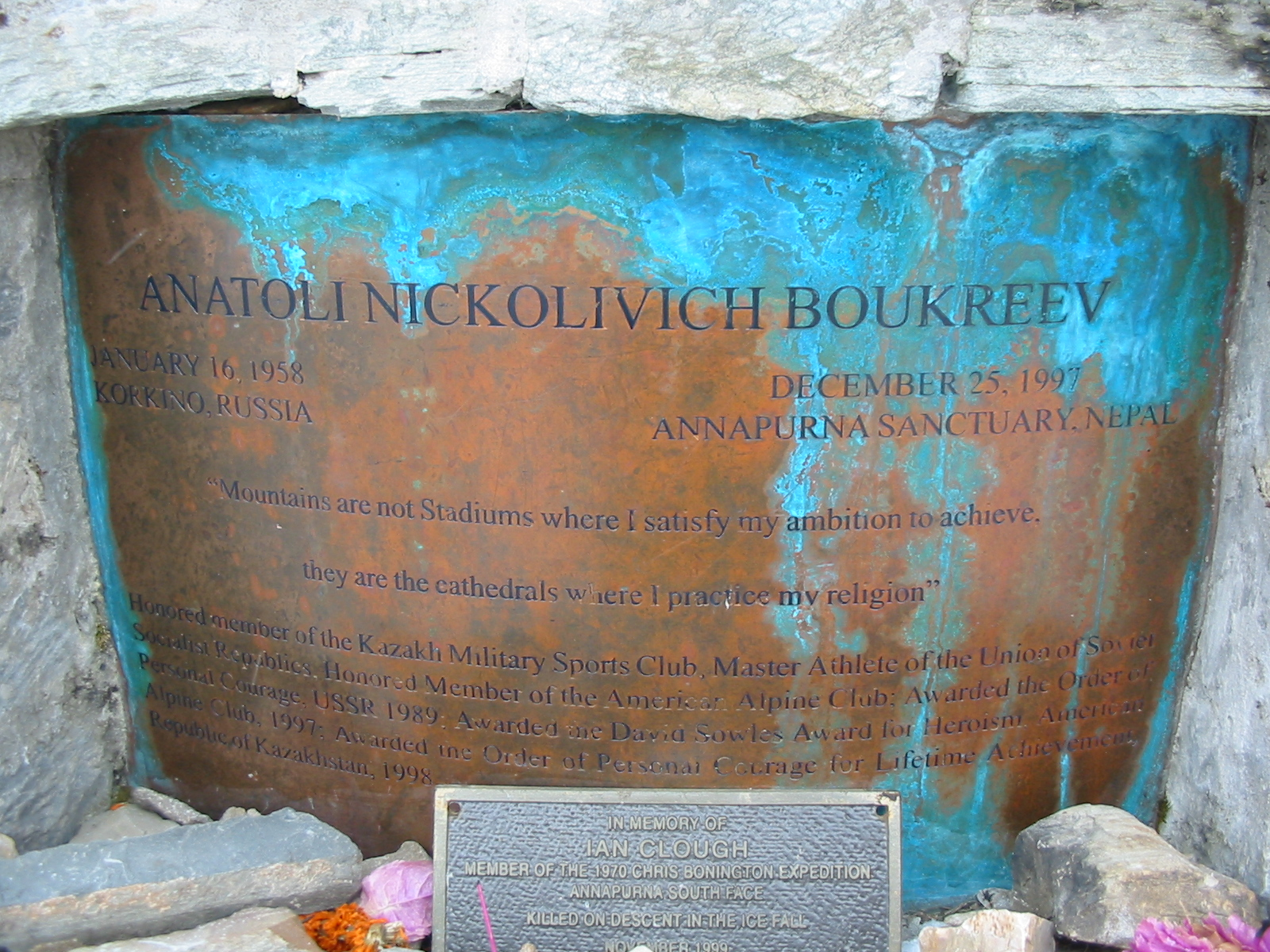
Anatoli Boukreev Memorial (1997) and Ian Clough (1970) memorials at the Annapurna Base Camp, Nepal.

Annapurna I is the world's 10th highest mountain. It is known for being an extremely difficult climb, with 75 deaths on its slopes as of April 2025.

List of deaths on Annapurna I
Date	Name	Nationality	Cause of death	References
8 April 2025	Rima Rinje Sherpa	Nepal	Avalanche	
8 April 2025	Ngima Tashi Sherpa	Nepal	Avalanche	
18 April 2023	Noel Hanna	United Kingdom	Exposure	
3 May 2019	Wui Kin Chin	Malaysia	Hypothermia/Frostbite	
24 March 2015	Samuli Mansikka	Finland	Fall	
24 March 2015	Pemba Sherpa	Nepal	Fall	
7 October 2012	Ivan Lobanov	Uzbekistan	Avalanche	
7 October 2012	Iljas Tukhvatullin	Uzbekistan	Avalanche	
5 May 2012	Tibor Horváth	Hungary	Avalanche	
18 October 2011	Young-seok Park	South Korea	Unknown	
18 October 2011	Dong-min Shin	South Korea	Unknown	
18 October 2011	Ki-seok Kang	South Korea	Unknown	
29 April 2010	Tolo Calafat	Spain	Exhaustion, HACE	
April 2009	Martin Minařík	Czech Republic	Fell into Crevasse	
23 May 2008	Iñaki Ochoa de Olza	Spain	HACE	
22 April 2007	Udhav Prasad Khanal	Nepal	Unknown	
22 October 2006	Lhakpa Rita II	Nepal	Avalanche	
18 May 2005	Christian Kuntner	Italy	Avalanche	
10 October 2004	Hideji Nazuka	Japan	Avalanche	
10 October 2004	Michio Sato	Japan	Avalanche	
29 April 1999	Hyun-ok Ji	South Korea	Unknown	
29 April 1999	Dorje Kami	Nepal	Unknown	
26 April 1998	Ang Tshering	Nepal	Avalanche	
25 December 1997	Anatoli Boukreev	Kazakhstan	Avalanche	
25 December 1997	Dmitri Sobolev	Kazakhstan	Avalanche	
23 March 1997	Ngati	Nepal	Fall	
11 October 1992	Pierre Béghin	France	Fall	
20 October 1991	Gabriel Denamur	Belgium	Unknown	
19 September 1991	Seog-jee Lee	South Korea	Avalanche	
19 September 1991	Song-gu Lee	South Korea	Avalanche	
19 September 1991	Sange Dawa	Nepal	Avalanche	
19 September 1991	Tendi Lhakpa	Nepal	Avalanche	
19 September 1991	Jangbu Nurbu	Nepal	Avalanche	
19 September 1991	Tenzing	Nepal	Avalanche	
28 October 1989	Milan Metkov	Bulgaria	Unknown	
28 October 1989	Ognian Stoykov	Bulgaria	Unknown	
18 October 1988	Ramiro Navarrete	Ecuador	Fall	
1 October 1988	Jiri Pelikan	Czechoslovakia	Fall on descent	
29 September 1988	Akihiro Mori	Japan	Avalanche	
29 September 1988	Ang Dawa	Japan	Avalanche	
20 December 1987	Toshiyuki Kobayashi	Japan	Fall	
20 December 1987	Yasuhira Saito	Japan	Fall	
24 May 1987	Andrés Ferrer	Spain	Fall	
23 September 1986	Benoit Grison	France	Fall	
7 December 1984	Pasang Norbu	Nepal	Unknown	
7 December 1984	Keepa	Nepal	Unknown	
21 April 1984	Philippe Dumas	France	Avalanche	
21 April 1984	Patrick Taglianut	France	Avalanche	
24 September 1983	Yang-kun Chung	South Korea	Avalanche	
24 September 1983	Magar Maila	Nepal	Avalanche	
24 September 1983	Rama Magar Tika	Nepal	Avalanche	
18 October 1982	Susumu Akimatsu	Japan	Avalanche	
18 October 1982	Miko Ono	Japan	Avalanche	
17 October 1982	Alex MacIntyre	United Kingdom	Rock fall	
12 May 1982	Rai Shanti	Nepal	Fall	
4 May 1982	Werner Bürkli	Switzerland	Heart attack	
31 October 1981	Yasuji Kato	Japan	Fall	
28 September 1981	Andre Durieux	France	Avalanche	
28 September 1981	Yves Favre	France	Avalanche	
27 September 1981	Ang Nima	Nepal	Avalanche	
27 September 1981	Pemba Tshering	Nepal	Avalanche	
19 September 1979	Eric Roberts	United Kingdom	Avalanche	
19 September 1979	Maynard Cohick	United States	Avalanche	
19 September 1979	Gil Harder	United States	Avalanche	
1 May 1979	Yves Morin	France	Exhaustion	
17 October 1978	Alison Chadwick-Onyszkiewicz	United Kingdom	Fall	
17 October 1978	Vera Watson	United States	Fall	
16 April 1975	Franz Tegischer	Austria	Avalanche	
26 September 1973	Leo Cerruti	Italy	Avalanche	
26 September 1973	Miller Rava	Italy	Avalanche	
18 May 1973	Tadashi Ushigoe	Japan	Avalanche	
18 May 1973	Sadatoshi Takahashi	Japan	Avalanche	
18 May 1973	Masanori Hama	Japan	Avalanche	
18 May 1973	Kazumi Katagiri	Japan	Avalanche	
18 May 1973	Rinje	Nepal	Avalanche	
30 May 1970	Ian Clough	United Kingdom	Serac fall	

=== Gasherbrum I ===
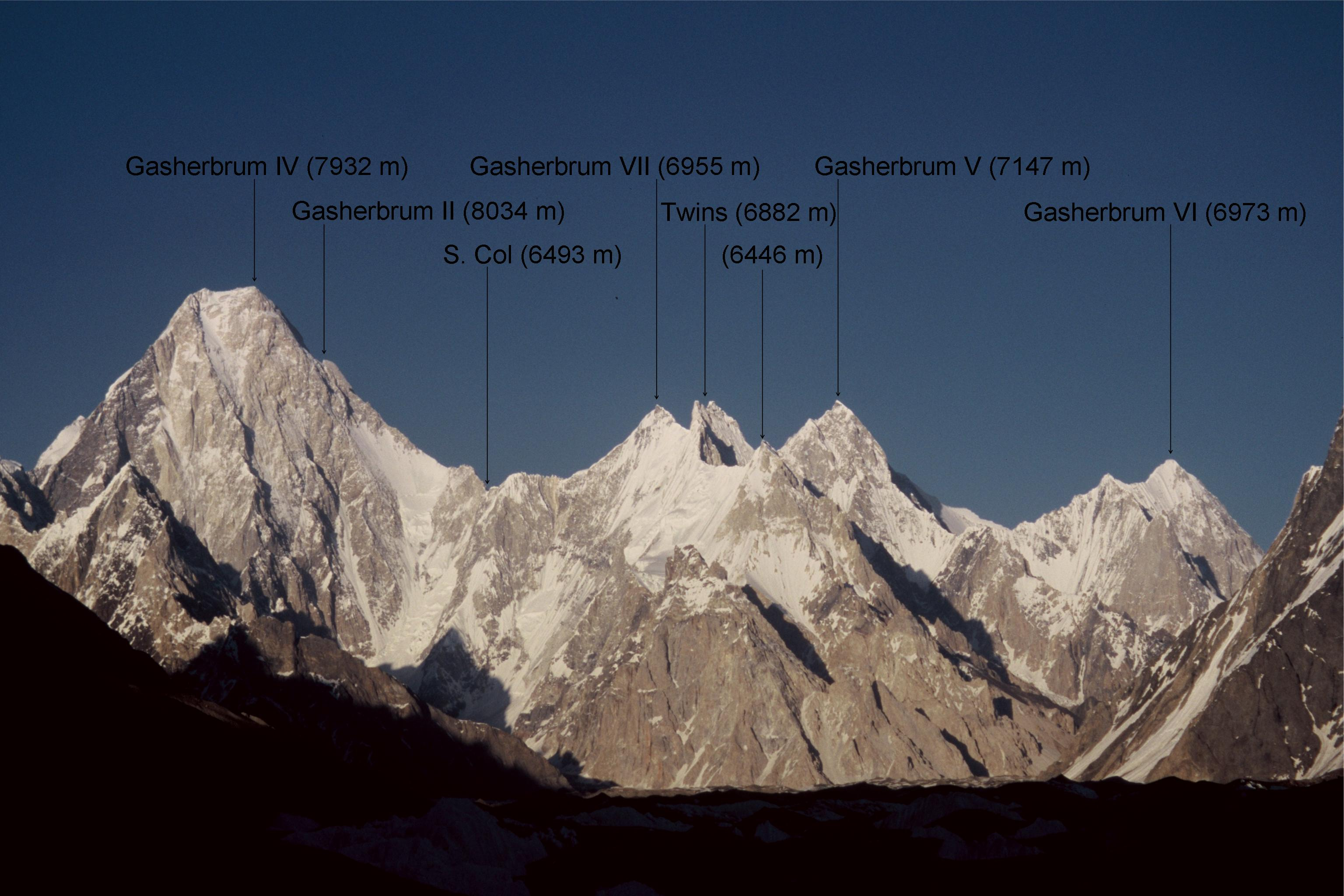
Western vantage of the Gasherbrum group of mountains

Gasherbrum I, also known as Hidden Peak or K5, is the world's 11th highest mountain. As of November 2025, Gashbrum I has 34 deaths.

List of deaths on Gasherbrum I
Date	Name	Nationality	Cause of death	References
8 August 2013	Zdeněk Hrubý	Czech Republic	Fall	
22 July 2013	Xevi Gómez	Spain	Disappeared	
22 July 2013	Álvaro Paredes	Spain	Disappeared	
22 July 2013	Abel Alonso	Spain	Disappeared	
7 July 2013	Artur Hajzer	Poland	Fall	
9 March 2012	Gerfried Göschl	Austria	Disappeared	
9 March 2012	Cedric Hählen	Switzerland	Disappeared	
9 March 2012	Nisar Hussain Sadpara	Pakistan	Disappeared	
18 June 2008	Jean-Noël Urban	France	Fall into crevasse	
29 July 2007	Jiri Danek	Czech Republic	Fall	
5 August 2005	Dawa Nurbu II	Nepal	Fall	
25 July 2004	José Antonio Antón	Spain	Fall	
7 September 2003	Mohammad Oraz	Iran	Avalanche caused injuries, died in hospital	
15 July 2003	Vladimir Pestrikov	Ukraine	Rock fall	
5 July 2003	José Manuel Buenaga	Spain	Disappeared	
5 July 2003	Nancy Silvestrini	Argentina	Disappeared	
9 July 2001	Claudio Gálvez Santibáñez	Chile	Fall, after successfully summiting	
1 August 1998	Yoshiumi Hayoshida	Japan	Avalanche	
1 August 1998	Kasunori Kutama	Japan	Avalanche	
1 August 1998	Kasutoshi Naito	Japan	Avalanche	
1 August 1998	Takashi Watanabe	Japan	Avalanche	
17 July 1996	Manuel Álvarez	Spain	Fall (between Camp III and Camp II)	
30 May 1993	Paolo Bernascone	Italy	Slab avalanche (below Camp I)	
19 August 1990	Josep Granyó	Spain	Disappeared	
19 August 1990	Albert Ibáñez	Spain	Disappeared	
12 July 1989	Dorje Tsindi	Nepal	Fall	
25 June 1988	Jorge Luis Brito	Mexico	Pulmonary edema	
29 July 1987	Mohsin Ali	Pakistan	Avalanche	
29 July 1987	Fakhar-ul-Islam	Pakistan	Avalanche	
29 July 1987	Fayyaz Hussain	Pakistan	Avalanche	
29 July 1987	Khalid Khan	Pakistan	Avalanche	
18 August 1986	Andreas Bührer	Switzerland	Fall	
31 May 1986	Muhammad Ali Ghulam	Pakistan	Pneumonia	
9–10 June 1977	Drago Bregar	Yugoslavia	Disappeared	

=== Broad Peak ===
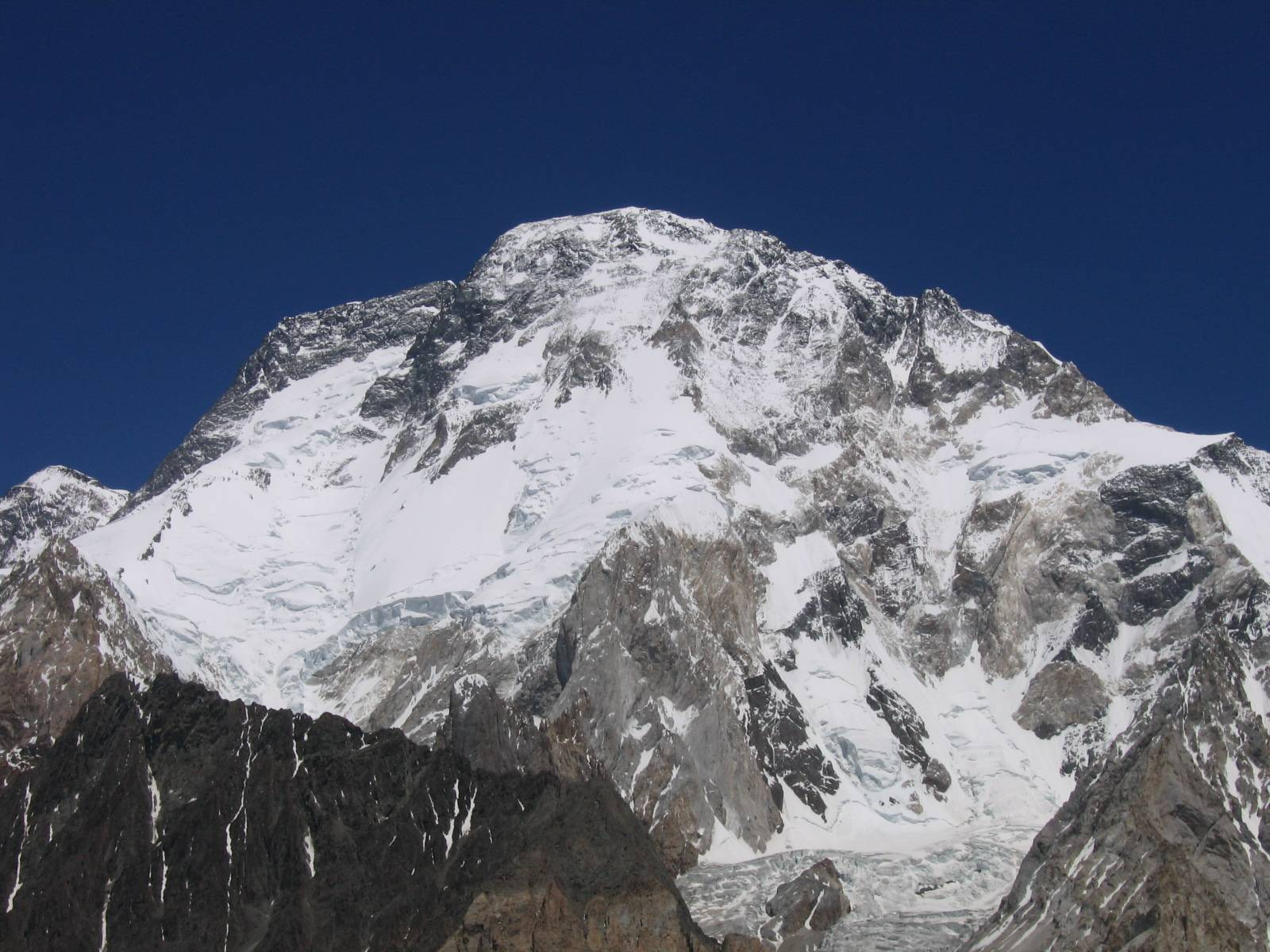
Broad Peak summit.

Broad Peak is the world's 12th highest mountain. As of July 2026, Broad Peak has 49 deaths.

List of deaths on Broad Peak
Date	Name	Nationality	Cause of death	References
30 July 2026	Nadhira Al Harthy	Oman	2026 Broad Peak avalanche: Avalanche	
30 July 2026	Pur Bahadur Gurung	Nepal	2026 Broad Peak avalanche: Avalanche	
30 July 2026	Sarah Mallory Geis	United States	2026 Broad Peak avalanche: Avalanche	
30 July 2026	Nirmal Purja ("Nimsdai")	United Kingdom / Nepal	2026 Broad Peak avalanche: Avalanche	
30 July 2026	Sohail Sakhi	Pakistan	2026 Broad Peak avalanche: Avalanche	
30 July 2026	Wang Zhong	China	2026 Broad Peak avalanche: Avalanche	
30 July 2026	Kili "Kilu" Pemba Sherpa	Nepal	2026 Broad Peak avalanche: Avalanche	
30 July 2026	Nima Sherpa	Nepal	2026 Broad Peak avalanche: Avalanche	
30 July 2026	Nawang Thindu Sherpa	Nepal	2026 Broad Peak avalanche: Avalanche	
30 July 2026	Gyalu Sherpa	Nepal	2026 Broad Peak avalanche: Avalanche	
11 August 2024	Murad Sadpara	Pakistan	Hit by falling rock	
19 July 2022	Gordon Henderson	United Kingdom	Fall	
5 July 2022	Sharif Sadpara	Pakistan	Fall	
5 July 2022	Imran Karim	Pakistan	Fall	
19 July 2021	Kim Hong-bin	South Korea	Fall	
July 2015	Qamber Ali Jangjupa	Pakistan	Avalanche	
23 July 2013	Aidin Bozorgi	Iran	Disappeared	
23 July 2013	Mojtaba Jarrahi	Iran	Disappeared	
23 July 2013	Pouya Keivan	Iran	Disappeared	
8 July 2013	Dana Heide	Germany	Slipped into a glacial stream near base camp	
6 March 2013	Maciej Berbeka	Poland	Disappeared	
6 March 2013	Tomasz Kowalski	Poland	Presumably exhaustion	
31 July 2012	Muhammad Baqir	Pakistan	Fall	
31 July 2012	Zuzana Hofmannová	Czech Republic	Disappeared	
25 July 2011	Jeffrey Wai Hung Chung	Hong Kong	Fall in crevasse	
18 July 2009	Cristina Castagna	Italy	Fall	
30 June 2008	Vladimir Plulik	Slovakia	Fall	
8 July 2006	Markus Kronthaler	Austria	Exhaustion	
11 July 1999	Seung-Kwon Hur	South Korea	Disappeared	
29 July 1998	Pascale Bessieres	France	Disappeared	
29 July 1998	Éric Escoffier	France	Disappeared	
16 July 1997	Jeffrey Ian Bubb	United States	Avalanche	
16 July 1997	Fukuzo Yokotagawa	Japan	Avalanche	
20 July 1996	Dong-keun Han	South Korea	Died on descent due to bad weather	
20 July 1996	Jae-mo Yang	South Korea	Died on descent due to bad weather	
20 July 1996	Sun-taek Lim	South Korea	Died on descent due to bad weather	
12 July 1995	Hyun-jae Park	South Korea	Fall	
22 June 1994	Alexej Himer	Czech Republic	Fall	
11 June 1994	Bohuslav Bilek	Czech Republic	Pulmonary edema	
24 July 1990	Kurt Lyncke-Krüger	West Germany	Fall	
20 August 1988	Yong-il Jang	South Korea	Avalanche	
22 August 1986	Liam Scott Elliott	United Kingdom	Fell	
18 August 1985	Barbara Kozłowska	Poland	Drowned in a glacier stream above BC	
16 May 1985	Hans Frick	Canada	Avalanche	
29 June 1983	Peter Thexton	United Kingdom	Pulmonary edema	
5 August 1981	Enric Pujol	Spain	Fall	
29 July 1975	Andrzej Sikorski	Poland	Fall	
29 July 1975	Marek Kęsicki	Poland	Fall	
29 July 1975	Bohdan Nowaczyk	Poland	Fall	

=== Gasherbrum II ===
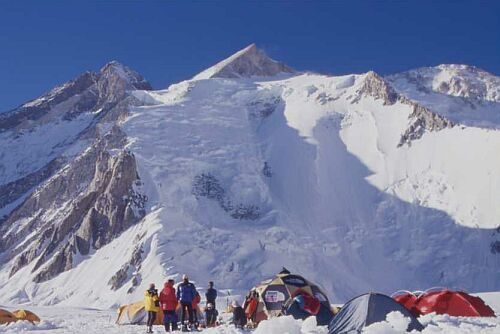
Left to right: Gasherbrum III, Gasherbrum II, Gasherbrum II East

Gasherbrum II, also known as K4, is the world's 13th highest mountain. As of November 2025, It is one of the safest 8000ers with only 25 deaths.

List of deaths on Gasherbrum II
Date	Name	Nationality	Cause of death	References
5 July 2022	Iram Karim	Pakistan	Slipped into a glacial stream near base camp	
25 July 2015	Aleksander Ostrowski	Poland	Avalanche (presumed)	
22 July 2011	Leila Esfandyari	Iran	Fall on descent	
21 July 2009	Luis María Barbero	Spain	Disappeared	
18 July 2007	Ernst-Robert Zauner	Germany	Avalanche	
18 July 2007	Arne Heckele	Germany	Avalanche	
3 July 2007	Ulrike Gschwandtner	Austria	Possibly Heart Failure	
20 July 2001	Jean-François Bassine	Belgium	Fall	
28 July 2000	Félix Iñurrategi	Spain	Fall	
13 July 1989	Antton Ibarguren	Spain	Fall	
9 July 1988	Gary Silver	United States	Fall	
6 July 1988	Michel Basson	France	Pulmonary Edema	
25 June 1988	Henri Albet	France	Fall on snowboard	
29 June 1987	Jean-Pierre Hefti	Switzerland	Fall	
12 July 1986	Carlos Rábago	Spain	Altitude sickness	
11 July 1985	Pierre Bouygues	France	Illness	
24 June 1985	Toru Nakano	Japan	Fall	
mid July 1982	Norbert Wolf	Austria	Cold	
mid July 1982	Gerhard Gruner	West Germany	Disappeared	
2 July 1982	Glenn Brindeiro	United States	Avalanche	
1 June 1976	Osamu Matsuura	Japan	Exhaustion	
27 May 1976	Yoshinori Hiramatsu	Japan	Fall	
27 May 1976	Taketoshi Miyamoto	Japan	Fall	
late June 1975	Bernard Villaret	France	Cold, exhaustion	

=== Shishapangma ===
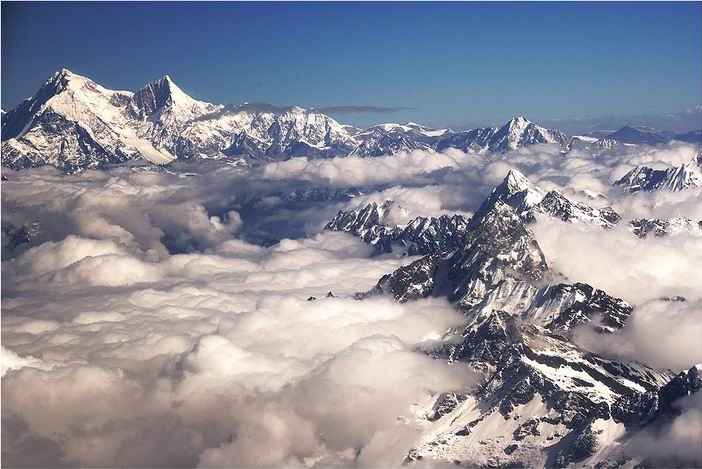
The summit of Shishapangma (far left).

Shishapangma, also called Gosainthān, is the world's 14th highest mountain. As of November 2025, Shishapangma has 36 deaths.

List of deaths on Shishapangma
Date	Name	Nationality	Cause of death	References
7 October 2023	Tenjen Sherpa	Nepal	Avalanche	
7 October 2023	Gina Marie Rzucidlo	United States	Avalanche	
7 October 2023	Anna Gutu	United States	Avalanche	
7 October 2023	Mingmar Sherpa	Nepal	Avalanche	
3 May 2018	Boyan Petrov	Bulgaria	Disappearance	
30 September 2016	Pemba Sherpa (Taplejung 8)	Nepal	Avalanche	
24 April 2016	Patrik Matiolli	Switzerland	Fall in crevasse	
24 April 2016	Jon David Johnston	Australia	Fall in crevasse	
24 September 2014	Sebastian Haag	Germany	Avalanche	
24 September 2014	Andrea Zambaldi	Italy	Avalanche	
11 May 2013	Unknown	Germany	HACE	
15 October 2009	Roberto Piantoni	Italy	Fall	
24 April 2007	Marek Hudák	Slovakia	Disappearance	
31 October 2006	Bruno Carvalho	Portugal	Fall	
3 October 2005	Stanislav Krylov	Russia	Disappearance	
28 September 2005	Martin Oczko	Czech Republic	Altitude sickness	
5 October 1999	Alex Lowe	United States	Avalanche	
5 October 1999	David Bridges	United States	Avalanche	
21 May 1998	Andreino Pasini	Italy	Illness	
5 October 1996	Viktor Pastukh	Ukraine	Avalanche	
5 October 1996	Gennadi Vasilenko	Ukraine	Avalanche	
19 May 1996/1997 (Discrepancy regarding the year of death between different sources)	Ming-Tse Kuo	Taiwan	Fall	
1 May 1996	Stefan Sluka	Slovakia	Disappeared on descent	
1 October 1994	Zdenek Slachta	Czech Republic	Avalanche	
18 September 1994	Tod Gassen	United States	Fall in crevasse	
29 September 1993	Bueoung-tae Park	South Korea	Fall	
20 September 1991	Hidekazu Gomi	Japan	Avalanche	
20 September 1991	Tetsuichi Miyashita	Japan	Avalanche	
22 May 1991	Werner Braun	Germany	Disappearance (probably avalanche)	
22 May 1991	Werner Meichsner	Germany	Disappearance (probably avalanche)	
22 May 1991	Günther Semmler	Germany	Disappearance (probably avalanche)	
22 May 1991	Karl-Heinz Thiele	Germany	Disappearance (probably avalanche)	
15 October 1990	Joan Martínez	Spain	Exposure	
4 October 1989	Luca Leonardi	Switzerland	Avalanche	
28 April 1983	Fritz Luchsinger	Switzerland	Altitude sickness	

== Deaths per mountain ==
Mountain	Number of deaths	Source
Everest	347	
K2	96	
Dhaulagiri I	92	
Manaslu	90	
Nanga Parbat	87	
Annapurna I	75	
Kangchenjunga	54	
Cho Oyu	52	
Makalu	51	
Broad Peak	49	
Shishapangma	36	
Gasherbrum I	34	
Gasherbrum II	25	
Lhotse	25	
Total	1,113	

== See also ==
- The Himalayan Database
- 1986 K2 disaster
- List of Mount Everest death statistics
- List of people who died climbing Mount Everest
- List of mountaineering disasters by death toll
- Lists of people by cause of death
- Mount Hood climbing accidents

== Bibliography ==
- Liam Neeson, Lhakpa Dorji, and Dorje Sherpa (1998). Everest (Documentary Film). Nepal, Colorado: Arcturus Motion Pictures, MacGillivray Freeman Films, Polartec.
