= Ang Tsering =

Nepali mountaineer

Ang Tshering
- Born: 1905; Thame, Nepal
- Died: May 22, 2002 (aged 96–97)
- Awards: German Red Cross medal

Ang Tshering (or Ang Tsering) (1905 – May 22, 2002) was a Nepalese Sherpa known for his participation in the 1924 British Mount Everest expedition and the 1934 Nanga Parbat climbing disaster.

Tshering was born in Thame, Nepal in 1905, and worked as a sherpa from 1924 to 1975. He worked as a sherpa for the British expedition to Mount Everest. He was paid "Twelve annas, that's three-quarters of a rupee." During the Nanga Parbat expedition, he spent seven or nine days in the storm until he reached Camp One, and then was able to alert the Germans about the disaster in which three German mountaineers, Ulrich Wieland, Willo Welzenbach and Willy Merkl, as well as six Sherpas, died. He worked as a sherpa for the 1965 Indian Everest Expedition.

In 1935, Ang Tshering was awarded the German Red Cross Medal for his bravery and dedication to duty in the 1934 Nanga Parbat climbing disaster. He was also awarded a Tiger Badge by the Himalayan Club, his 'Himalayan Club Number' was 36.

He is not the Ang Tsering who worked as a sherpa for Junko Tabei on her historic climb of Everest, when she became the first woman to summit the mountain, as Tabei's memoir clearly states that the Ang Tsering she summited Everest with in 1975 was the twenty-seven year old brother-in-law of their government liaison officer Lhakpa Tenzing.
