= Uteshev =

Uteshev is a family name of Kazakh origin.

- Nurlan Uteshev, the leader of the Jas Otan party, Kazakhstan
- Yuri Uteshev, a Russian mountaineer
