= 1934 Nanga Parbat climbing disaster =

Himalayan expedition

Coordinates: 35.319°N 74.626°E

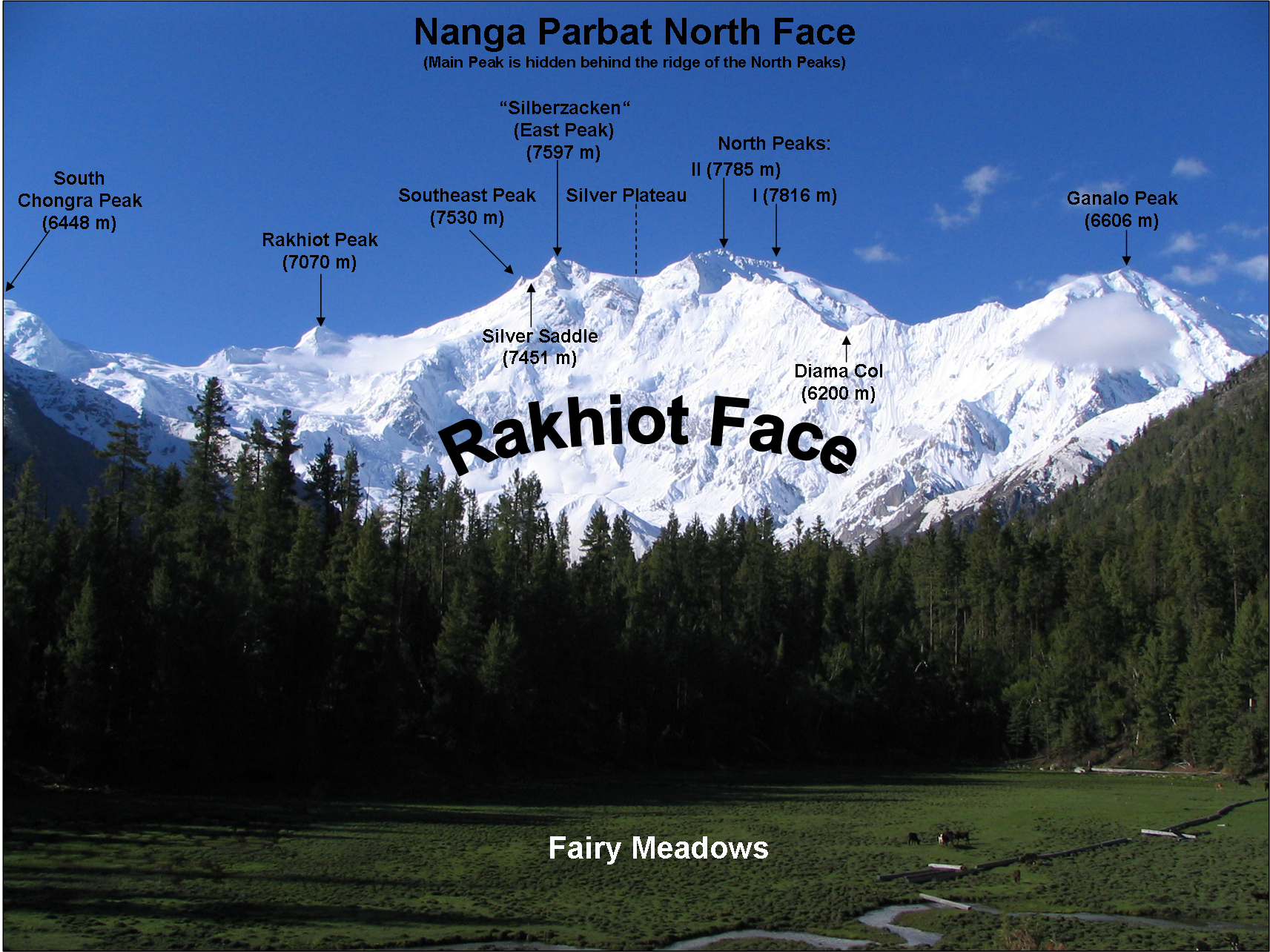
Nanga Parbat

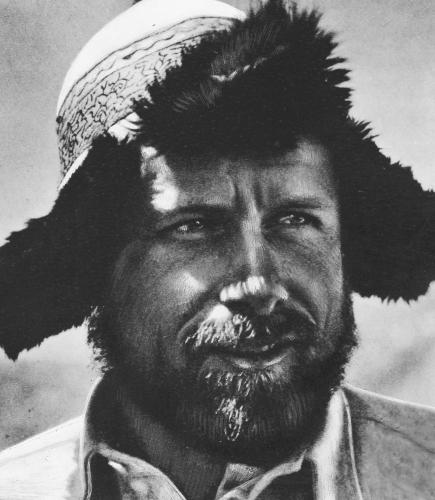
Willy Merkl, leader of the expedition

The 1934 Nanga Parbat climbing disaster resulted in the loss of 10 lives on Nanga Parbat, the world's ninth-highest mountain and one of the 14 eight-thousanders. The disaster, which happened during the 1934 climbing season, included nine climbers who died in what was, at the time, the deadliest mountaineering accident in history.

== Event ==
In 1934, German climber Willy Merkl led a well financed expedition to Nanga Parbat (located in Jammu and Kashmir, British India; present-day Gilgit-Baltistan, northeastern Pakistan), with the full backing of the newly-established Nazi Germany. Early in the expedition Alfred Drexel died, probably of high-altitude pulmonary edema (HAPE). The Tyrolean climbers Peter Aschenbrenner and Erwin Schneider reached an estimated height of (7,895 m / 25,900 ft) on July 6, but were forced to return because of worsening weather. On July 7, they and 14 others were trapped by a ferocious storm at 7,480 m (24,540 ft). During the desperate retreat that followed, three famous German mountaineers, Ulrich Wieland, Willo Welzenbach and Merkl himself, as well as six Sherpas, died of exhaustion, exposure and altitude sickness, and several more suffered severe frostbite. The last survivor to reach safety, Ang Tsering, did so having spent seven days battling through the storm. It has been said that the disaster, "for sheer protracted agony, has no parallel in climbing annals."

== Books and films ==
The official expedition report was written by Fritz Bechtold who was a member of both the 1932 and the 1934 expeditions. Bechtold and Merkl, the expedition leader, had been great friends since childhood and it has been suggested that Bechtold's accounts provide a distorted view of Merkl's actions during the expedition and, in order to appeal to circles in the Third Reich, a glorified view of the expedition and its leadership is presented. Another commentator has written that during the expedition Bechtold was "assuming more and more backstage influence over him (Merkl) and putting the expedition to his own official narrative purpose".

Jonathan Neale wrote a book about the 1934 climbing season on Nanga Parbat called Tigers of the Snow. He interviewed many old Sherpas, including Ang Tsering, the last man off Nanga Parbat alive in 1934. The book attempts to narrate what went wrong on the expedition, set against mountaineering history of the early twentieth century, the background of German politics in the 1930s, and the hardship and passion of life in the Sherpa valleys.

During the 1934 expedition Bechtold and Peter Müllritter recorded footage which was edited by the German filmmaker Frank Leberecht (1906-1970) into a 32 minute documentary. The film was praised by Hans von Tschammer und Osten and was premiered on 18 February in Munich at the conclusion of the 1936 Winter Olympics. Leberecht later created the 1936 film "Nanga Parbat: Das Schicksal deutscher Helden" (Note: The title in The English would be: would be: "Nanga Parbat - the fate of German Heroes") as a record of the 1934 expedition.

== See also ==
- List of deaths on eight-thousanders
- List of mountaineering disasters by death toll
