= Marty Schmidt =

New Zealand-American mountaineer, guide and adventurer (1960–2013)

Martin (Marty) Walter Schmidt
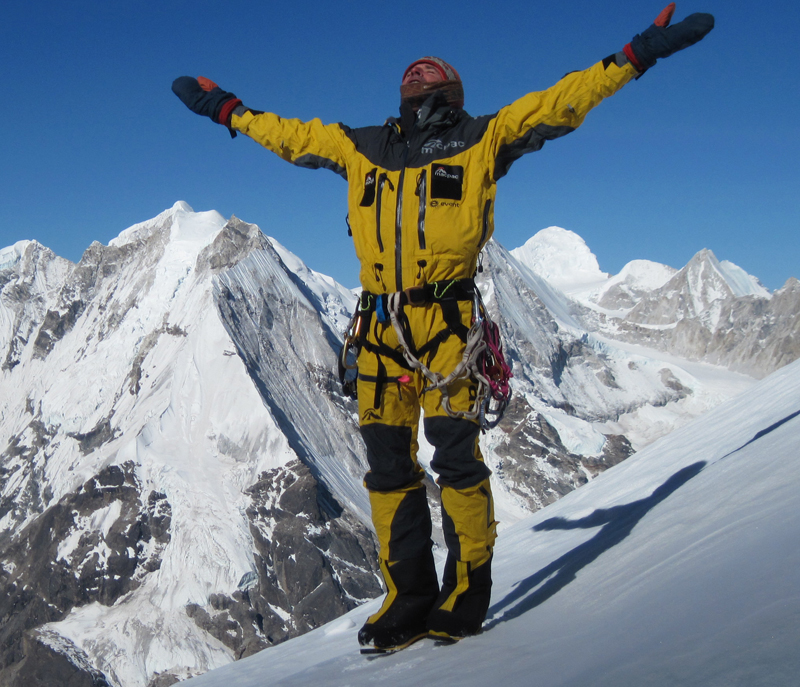
- Born: June 10, 1960; Lodi, California
- Died: July 27, 2013 (aged 53); K2, Pakistan
- Cause of death: Avalanche
- Citizenship: New Zealand
- Spouse: Joanne Patti Munisteri
- Children: Denali Schmidt (d.7/27/13) Sequoia Patti Schmidt

Martin Walter Schmidt (June 10, 1960 – July 27, 2013), known as Marty, was a New Zealand-American mountaineer, guide and adventurer.

Schmidt and his son, Denali, died in 2013, while attempting to summit the mountain K2.

== Personal life ==
Martin Walter Schmidt was born in Lodi, California on June 10, 1960, of German/American parents. He attended Castro Valley High School in Castro Valley, California. He began climbing as a young boy, mostly in the Sierra Nevada range where he moved after finishing high school in 1978. At the age of 20, Schmidt joined the United States Air Force (USAF) and served in the United States Air Force Pararescue unit known as the "PJs". As a USAF airman he served at a number of posts including the Philippines, where he earned the USAF Air Medal in 1984, for his rescues in a hotel fire; and in Alaska, where he first climbed Denali in 1983.

Marty met his first wife Joanne Patti Munisteri in Santa Cruz, California in 1986. They were married and had their first child, son Denali Schmidt in Macksville, Australia on April 27, 1988. Joanne was hired by Kahurangi National Maori Dance Theatre based in Hastings, New Zealand in 1989. Their daughter, Sequoia Patti Schmidt, was born in Napier, New Zealand on January 1, 1991. The Schmidt family were sponsored by Ngati Kahungunu and received their New Zealand citizenship in 1994. Marty and Denali used their New Zealand passports to travel and climb K2 in 2013, where they both perished.

== Climbing career ==
Schmidt climbed and guided in the mountains of Europe, South America, Africa and the Himalayas. His first high altitude ascents on Denali in Alaska were from 1983 to 1986. Schmidt acted as an assistant guide on Aconcagua in Argentina in 1988, before creating his own company and guiding in the Andes as MSIG (Marty Schmidt International Guiding). He made his first ascent of Mount Cook in New Zealand in November 1988. In the Himalayas, Schmidt attempted to climb Mount Everest in 1994 and 2008. He summited Kangchenjunga in 2001, and summited Cho Oyu in 2001, 2004 and 2009. In the Karakoram, he made unsuccessful attempts on K2 in 1992 and 2000, and summited Gasherbrum I and Gasherbrum II in 2010. In the 2010 Himalayan climbing season, Schmidt became the third New Zealander to summit Makalu solo and the first to do so without bottled oxygen. Schmidt summited Ama Dablam and attempted Lhotse in the same season. Schmidt led two successful expeditions to Mount Everest guiding for the Canada-based company Peak Freaks in 2012 and 2013. In 2012, he became the oldest New Zealander to summit Everest at the age of 51. He summited Everest again in May 2013.

Marty and Denali Schmidt created a new route on Denali in 2011. They named this route "Dad and Son". In 2013, Marty and Denali Schmidt summited Broad Peak, an 8,000-meter climb in Pakistan before attempting to summit K2. Marty, Denali and Mike Horn participated in a rescue attempt on Broad Peak for the three young Iranian climbers in July 2013, but they were unsuccessful and the Iranian climbers were never found. After this rescue work, Marty, Denali and other climbers started on their ascent of K2. However, they were advised by expedition sherpas that conditions were too dangerous to attempt to climb higher at that time. All the other teams and climbers turned around except for Marty who made the decision to continue on alone with his son, Denali. Marty and Denali climbed toward K2's Camp 3, but went missing after an avalanche hit their camp on 26 July; Marty Schmidt's daughter, Sequoia Di Angelo, confirmed their deaths via Twitter on 29 July 2013.

Schmidt climbed and guided clients on all of the Seven Summits—the highest mountains on each continent—and climbed five of the world's fourteen 8,000 meter peaks. Throughout his career, he climbed and summited – Denali 29 times, Aconcagua 34 times (five different routes including the south face), Aoraki / Mount Cook 26 times, Mount Aspiring / Tititea 16 times, Mount Tasman 7 times and Mount Everest two times. Schmidt was a member of the American Alpine Guides and became a member of the New Zealand Alpine guides in 2003.

== Legacy ==
Peter Hillary noted the loss of Schmidt and remarked on his enthusiasm. The place of his residency, Christchurch, New Zealand, held a memorial service for Schmidt and his son at the Horticultural Society Hall in Hagley Park. Schmidt's daughter, Sequoia, traveled to Pakistan and K2 to search for the remains of her father and brother in 2015. Her book, Journey of Heart-A Sojourn to K2, was a finalist for the International Book Award for Non-Fiction in 2016.

== See also ==
- Listing of deaths on K2
