= Ji Hyeon-ok =

South Korean mountaineer (1961–1999)

- Born: Ji Hyeon-ok; January 20, 1961; Nonsan, South Korea
- Died: April 29, 1999 (aged 38); Annapurna, Nepal
- Occupation: Mountaineer
- Known for: First Korean woman to climb Mr. Everest

Korean name
- Hangul: 지현옥
- Hanja: 池賢玉
- RR: Ji Hyeonok
- MR: Chi Hyŏnok

Ji Hyeon-ok (Korean: 지현옥; January 20, 1961 – April 29, 1999) was a South Korean mountaineer.

Born in Nonsan, she climbed several of the tallest mountains in the world, including Denali (Mount McKinley) in 1988, Mount Everest, in 1993, becoming the first Korean woman to do so, Gasherbrum I, in 1997 and Gasherbrum II, in 1998.

On April 29, 1999, she went missing while climbing the Annapurna; Ji set foot on the peak but failed to return to the base camp.

On 20 January 2015, Google Doodle commemorated her 56th birthday.
