= Nadezhda Oleneva =

Russian mountaineer (1985 to 2023)

Personal information
- Nationality: Russia
- Born: Надежда Александровна Оленёва; November 19, 1985 Perm, Russian SFSR, USSR
- Died: October 14, 2023 (aged 37) Dhaulagiri, Nepal

Sport
- Rank: 2nd (2020); 3rd (2019)
- Event: Rock class of Mountaineering

Nadezhda Alexandrovna Oleneva (19 November 1985 – 14 October 2023: Ru: Наде́жда Алекса́ндровна Оленёва) was a Russian mountaineer, alpinist and rock climber, and member of the Russian national mountaineering team. She was twice nominated for a Piolet d'Or, and up until her death in a fall on Dhaulagiri I in 2023, was considered one of Russia's most decorated and strongest female climbers.

== Biography ==
Oleneva was born on November 19, 1985, in Perm, Russian SFSR. She became interested in mountaineering in 2006 during her first trip to the mountains. Oleneva graduated from the Central Russian School of Mountaineering Instructors in 2017 and founded the Perm School of Mountaineering that same year. In 2020, she won the silver medal in the rock class in the Russian Mountaineering Championship, having won the bronze in the same class a year prior. Between 2006 and 2023, Oleneva made a total of over 200 ascents. The Ministry of Sports of Perm Krai declared Oleneva as Russia's best mountaineer.

On October 14, 2023, Oleneva fell while ascending Dhaulagiri in Nepal. At the time, she was at an altitude of 6,680m. Roman Abildaev and Rasim Kashapov, two climbers with her at the time, stated that she had fallen over 500 meters. On October 20, the head coach of the Russian mountaineering team stated Oleneva's body would never be found as an avalanche had occurred and her body would be inextricable from the ice.
