= Nancy Silvestrini =

Argentine climber (1972–2003)

Personal information
- Full name: Nancy Noemí Silvestrini
- Born: 5 April 1972 Guaymallén Mendoza, Argentina
- Died: July 5, 2003 (aged 31) Gasherbrum I, Pakistan

Climbing career
- Major ascents: First Argentine woman to summit an eight-thousander

Nancy Noemí Silvestrini (5 April 1972; Mendoza, Argentina - 5 July 2003; Gasherbrum I, Pakistán) was an Argentinian alpinist who was known for her six summits of Aconcagua and for being the first Argentine woman to summit an eight-thousander.

== Biography ==
Originally trained as a computer systems analyst, she sought refuge in the mountains and began climbing in 1996 after her brother and husband were killed in separate accidents. She trained at the Valentín Ugarte Guide School and worked for many years as a guide on Cerro Aconcagua (6962 m), the highest mountain in America.

In 1999, she summited Argentina's Monte Pissis volcano with an all-female expedition. Later climbed Nevado Sajama and Huayna Potosí in Bolivia, and Tocllaraju in Peru. On 1 June 2003 she joined an expedition team of Spanish climbers including Eva Zarzuelo, Jorge Egocheaga, José Manuel Buenaga for an attempt on Gasherbrum.

=== Final climb ===
On 5 July 2003, at the age of 31, she summited Gasherbrum I, becoming the first Argentine woman to do so. As the team descended, a strong storm battered the climbers between the summit and Camp III at 7,300 metres (24,000 ft). Nancy fell and broke her arm, but was able to recover. As she got up, high winds tore Nancy and José Manuel Buenaga Villanueva from the mountain, where they fell to their deaths at 6,300 metres (20,700 ft). Nancy fell into a crevasse on the Pakistani side of the mountain. Buenaga Villanueva was swept off towards the Chinese side. Buenaga's body was found and buried on the mountain, Nancy's was unable to be recovered.
