= Cedric Hählen =

Swiss mountaineer (1981–2012)

Cedric Haehlen
- Cedric Hählen
- Born: 19 September 1981; Aargau, Switzerland
- Disappeared: 9 March 2012; Gasherbrum I
- Monuments: Gilkey Memorial
- Occupations: Landscape gardener, trainee mountain guide

Cedric Hählen (19 September 1981 – missing 9 March 2012) was a Swiss mountaineer. During his lifetime, he was the youngest European to climb K2, and climbed five eight-thousanders before the age of thirty.

== Biography ==
Cedric Hählen began climbing in the Alps as a child. In his teens, he would spend 30 to 40 weekends a year on mountain tours. He developed his skills in climbing competitions for the Swiss Alpine Club, taking part in sixteen climbing competitions between 1995 and 2003.

Later he began taking part in expeditions to climb eight-thousanders in the Himalayas and Karakoram.

In 2002, at age 19, he travelled to climb in South America. There, he made a number of ascents across Peru and Bolivia, including Huayna Potosi. Less than six months later, Hählen made his first attempt to climb an eight-thousander, Shishapangma. Hählen reached 7700 m before returning to base camp. On his first visit to Pakistan, Hählen became captivated by the country, and would return to climb there again and again.

In 2004, he became the youngest European person to climb K2. The next year, he was part of a Swiss-German team that made the first probable ascent of Central Farol Peak (6,350 m) in the Masherbrum Mountains in Baltistan in Pakistan.

In 2006, Hählen, alongside Hans Mitterer and Ueli Steck made the first ascent of the north face of Gasherbrum II East (7,772m), from China. At the time, the climb was called one of "the finest achievements in the Karakoram".

By the age of 30, Hählen had summitted five eight-thousanders and been on eleven expeditions. Between expeditions, he would return home to his work as a landscape gardener. In an effort to support himself and his climbing, in 2010, Hählen began training to become a certified alpine guide. As a training guide, he brought an expedition of tourists to climb to the summit of Mount Kilimanjaro in 2011.

In 2011, Hählen was invited by Gerfried Göschl to take part in an expedition attempting the first winter ascent of Gasherbrum I. On 9 March 2012 the expedition team (Hählen, along with Gerfried Göschl and Nisar Hussain Sadpara) lost contact with base camp after relying that they were 450m below base camp. Multiple search and rescue expeditions were launched for the missing climbers. Despite considerable efforts, no trace of the climbers has ever been found.

During the expedition, a film crew was following the climb for a mountain film documentary. After the climbers were lost, the footage was turned into a tribute, Der letzte Weg, produced by Red Bull Media House.

== Mountaineering ==
- 2003 - Shishapangma
- 2004 - K2 8611 m
- 2004 - Aconcagua
- 2006 - Gasherbrum II East First ascent from China
- 2006 - Broad Peak
- 2011 - Kangchenjunga
- 2011 - Kilimanjaro
- 2012 - Gasherbrum I
