= Stefano Zavka =

Italian mountaineer (1972-2007)

Personal information
- Born: 24 June 1972 Terni, Italy
- Died: 20 July 2007 (aged 35) K2, Pakistan
- Monuments: Gilkey Memorial, K2; asteroid 8943 Stefanozavka is named in his honor
- Occupations: Mountain guide, President of the Association of Guides of Monti Sibillini National Park

Sport
- Sport: Alpine mountaineer
- Club: Club Alpino Italiano Sezione di Terni

Stefano Zavka (24 June 1972 – 20 July 2007) was an Italian mountaineer and alpinist. Zavka's disappearance on K2 received wide exposure as the expedition was documented by Italian journalist Marco Mazzocchi and public broadcaster RAI for the documentary K2: The Dream, the Nightmare (original title: K2: Il sogno, l'incubo).

== Life ==
Zavka was born in 1972 in Terni, Umbria, to Sergio and Rita Zavka. He began mountain climbing at age 17 after participating in a climbing course by the Club Alpino Italiano in his hometown. He soon dedicated himself to mountaineering full time, becoming Umbria's first climbing guide, a ski mountaineer, as well as participating in cycling competitions. In 2005, he became the president of the Association of Guides of Monti Sibillini National Park, where he was responsible for promoting the park to visitors.

The K2 Freedom Exhibition was climbing via the Abruzzi Spur, pictured above in route F

Before he began climbing in the Himalayas, he made a number of ascents in the Dolomites and across the Alps, including Gran Sasso d'Italia, La Farfalla and Marmolada.

In 2004, he made his first attempt at the summit of K2 as a member of the Italian expedition K2 2004 – 50 years later. The expedition was to mark the 50th anniversary of the first successful Italian ascent of K2, but quickly ran into difficulties when five porters were killed on the way to base camp. Only five climbers of the 19 member climbing team successfully summited, with Zavka turning back 400 meters before the summit. In his way down, Zavka assisted in a high mountain rescue of Juanito Oiarzabal, who suffered frostbite and had been lost on the descent. Later he said the experience climbing K2 was beautiful, but "very stressful, in which the effort outweighed the fun."

=== Final climb ===
In 2007, Zavka made his second attempt at K2 as a part of the K2 Freedom Expedition. The expedition was led by Daniele Nardi and filmed by sports journalist Marco Mazzocchi and a team from the Italian public broadcaster, RAI. The expedition left Italy on 3 June. Zavka was carrying a sculpture by Agabito Miniucchi, an artist from his hometown of Terni, to place at the summit.

On 10 July the team arrived at camp 2, where the weather worsened. On 20 July 2007 the team left camp 4 and headed to the summit. It was a busy summit push day, with climbing teams from Russia, Korea and the United States also making summit attempts. The Italian team left three hours after the other teams. Daniele Nardi pushed ahead of his team to summit first, passing Zavka and Mario Vielmo on the ascent, while expedition member Michele Fait stopped 500m from the summit and returned to camp 4. Nardi summited at 1 pm Italian time, sharing the details with Mazzocchi and broadcasting online in real time. As he began to descend, he passed Zavka and Vielmo, telling them the summit is "an hour, an hour and a half" away, even though weather conditions were beginning to deteriorate.

Zavka and Vielmo finally summited together at 6.49 pm Italian time, before starting their descent down to camp 4. Zavka was beginning to suffer from frostbite and encouraged Vielmo to go ahead of him, which caused the climbers to separate. American climber Don Bowie photographed Vielmo and Zavka together near the Bottleneck couloir before Vielmo continued downwards and safely made it to camp 4. After reaching the camp, Vielmo looked for Zavka further up the mountain, but could not see him. On 21 July the team headed to base camp without sighting Zavka. Zavka's body has never been found.

==== Controversy ====
After the release of the documentary K2: Il sogno, l'incubo, questions remained around Zavka's disappearance. Several aspects of the expedition were critiqued, such as expedition leader Nardi making a solo summit push, the role of the embedded journalist, the route, Nardi's role in allowing Vielmo and Zavka to continue their summit push despite the deteriorating weather and late hour, Vielmo separating from Zavka and leaving him without a radio, and the team returning to base camp without searching for Zavka.

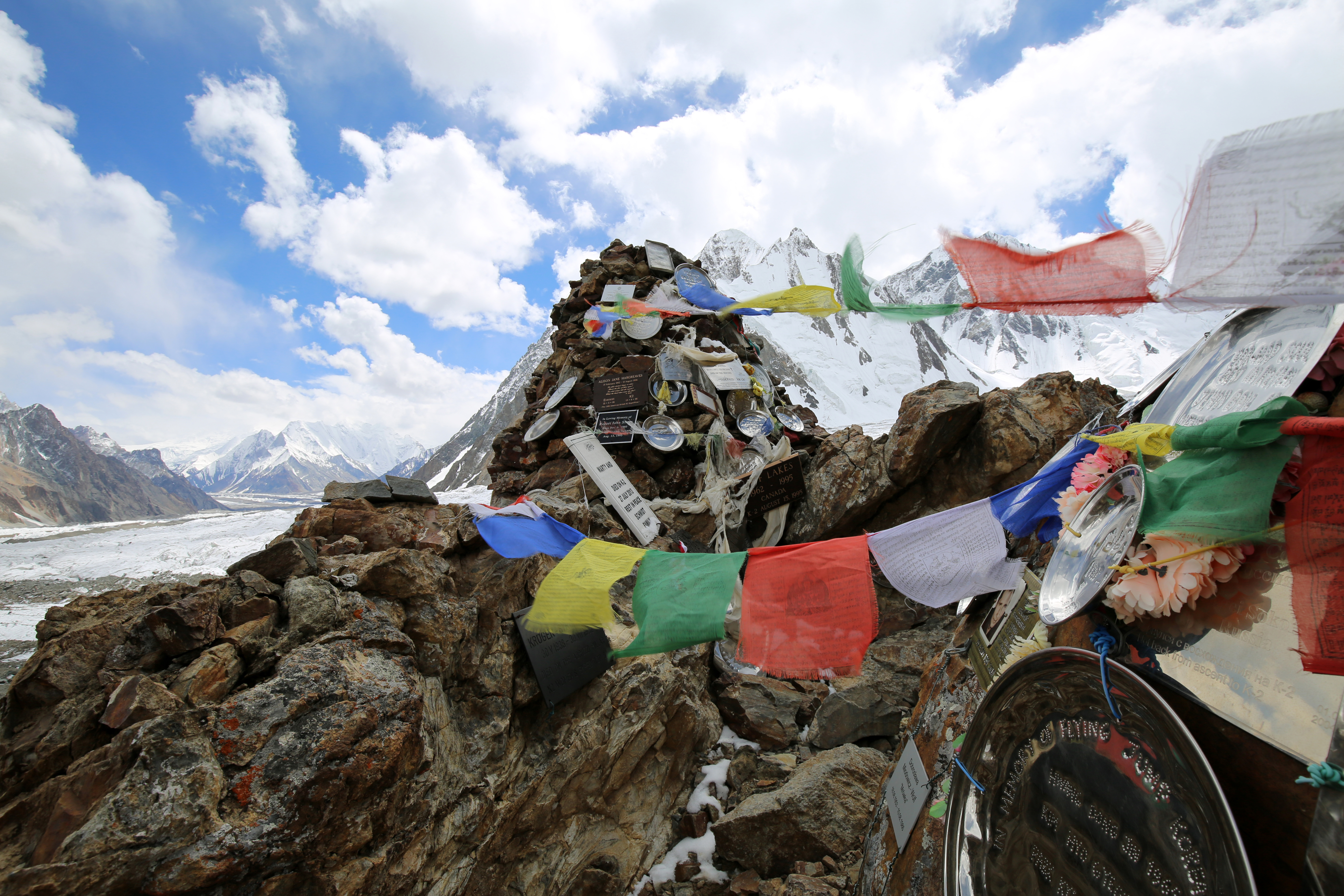
After his disappearance, Zavka's name was inscribed on the Gilkey Memorial at K2 Base Camp.

=== Memorials ===
After his death, Zavka's friends and family formed the Associazione Stefano Zavka to promote alpinism and ethics in mountaineering. The organization hosts events related to mountaineering ethics and culture as well as the traditional mountain festival 'Vette in Vista' in Terni.

The alpine club in Terni, Zavka's hometown, was renamed to Club Alpino Italiano Sez. di Terni Stefano Zavka in his memory.

In 2008, a team of climbers from the Italian Alpine Club established four new routes on Castle Peak, at the southern rim of the Chhudong Glacier in Himachal Pradesh, and named one route after Zavka. In June 2008, Daniele Nardi, the expedition leader of the K2 Freedom Expedition, dedicated his summit of Nanga Parbat to Zavka.

In 2009, the asteroid 8943 Stefanozavka was named after him.

In 2017, Lorenza Moroni wrote Salir con Stefano Zavka, a biography of Zavka's life and the controversy over his death.

In 2022, a path along the Nera river in his hometown of Terni was named after him.
