= Yuri Uteshev =

Russian mountain climber (1955–2006)

- Born: 12 January 1955
- Died: August 13, 2006 (aged 51); K2, Karakoram range, Pakistan
- Cause of death: Avalanche
- Occupation: Mountaineer

Yuri Uteshev (January 12, 1955 — August 13, 2006) was a Russian mountaineer who ascended Dhaulagiri in 1995, Makalu in 1996, Lhotse in 1997 and Mount Everest in 2001.

He died in an avalanche on the Karakoram mountain K2, where he led a team of four from Kuzbass.
