= Willy Merkl =

German mountain climber (1900–1934)

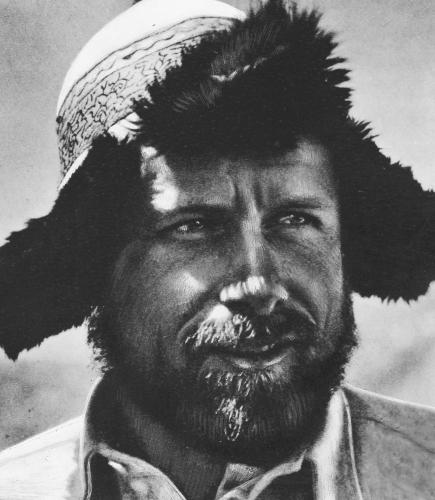
- Willy Merkl, 1934

Personal information
- Born: 6 October 1900 Kaltennordheim, Germany
- Died: 15–17 July 1934 (at 33 years of age) Nanga Parbat, Karakoram, Pakistan
- Occupations: engineer and mountaineer

Climbing career
- First ascents: Hörndlwand, Chiemgau Alps, 1916 - 1920; Kleine Mühlsturzhorn, S Wall, Berchtesgaden Alps, 1923; Rothorn, northern buttress, Loferer Steinberge, 1927; S face & N Ridge of Punta Civetta, Dolomites, 1925; Traverse of the Lastei Towers, Pala group, Dolomites, 1926; N.W. wall of Cima di Campido, Pala group, Dolomites, 1926; North Ridge of Koshtan-Tau, Caucasus, 1929
- Known for: 1932 & 1934 expeditions to Nanga Parbat

Willy Merkl (6 October 1900 – 15/17 July 1934) was a German mountain climber who is most notable for his attempt to lead a German-American team up the Nanga Parbat (the Naked Mountain) in the Himalayas in 1932.

His team were known to be very experienced in Alpine and European mountain expeditions. Merkl and Fritz Bechtold had also climbed in the Caucasus in 1929. However, they were unprepared for the trials of the Himalayas. Despite being forced to turn back in 1932, the team did make excellent progress and found a way through the Rakhiot Peak and the main ridge.

In 1934 he led another expedition up the same mountain that proved to be fatal. Although this expedition was better prepared and financed by Nazi Germany, due in large part to the Nazis' desire to symbolically 'conquer any peak', the weather proved too strong and overtook the climbers. On July 6, the team was at a good point to attempt the final stretch of the climb. Had the climbers set out right then, some could have likely been well on their way to the top. However, Merkl wanted the entire team to arrive at the same time, so they waited a day to rest the group, assuming all would be well. Instead, the next day saw the beginning of a snowstorm and blizzard that lasted for nine days. When it let up, Merkl, two other members of the team, and six Sherpas were dead. It is apparent that their deaths had been slow and extremely arduous, caused by an extended exposure to the cold and starvation.

The frozen bodies of Merkl and Sherpa Gaylay were found in 1938 after another German expedition stumbled upon the snow cave in which they had taken refuge.

Karl Herrligkoffer, Merkl's half-brother, initiated and then led the Willy-Merkl-Gedächtnisexpedition, the 1953 German–Austrian Nanga Parbat expedition which was the first to reach the summit.
