= List of 2010 films based on actual events =

This is a list of films and miniseries released in 2010 that are based on actual events. All films on this list are from American production unless indicated otherwise.

== 2010 ==
- 2 Frogs in the West (French: 2 frogs dans l'ouest) (2010) – Canadian comedy drama film inspired by director Papineau's own experience travelling from his home province of Québec to Alberta during his undergraduate degree
- 22 Bullets (French: L'Immortel) (2010) – French gangster-action film telling a part of the life story of Jacky Imbert
- 71: Into the Fire (Korean: 포화 속으로) (2010) – South Korean war drama film based on a true story of a group of 71 under-trained and under-armed, outgunned student-soldiers of South Korea during the Korean War, who were mostly killed on August 11, 1950, during the Battle of P'ohang-dong
- 127 Hours (2010) – biographical psychological survival film based on the story of Aron Ralston, the American mountain climber who amputated his own arm to free himself after being trapped by a boulder for six days in Bluejohn Canyon in 2003
- A Few with Courage (Spanish: Unos Pocos con Valor) (2010) – Honduran biographical crime film following a group of special forces police officers who come up against the most dangerous gang in Honduras, based on real life events
- Aftershock (Mandarin: 唐山大地震) (2010) – Chinese disaster drama film depicting the aftermath of the 1976 Tangshan earthquake
- All Good Things (2010) – crime romantic drama film inspired by the life of accused murderer Robert Durst, the film chronicles the life of the wealthy son of a New York real estate tycoon, a series of murders linked to him, and his volatile relationship with his wife and her subsequent unsolved disappearance
- Amish Grace (2010) – biographical crime drama television film based on the 2006 West Nickel Mines School shooting at Nickel Mines, Pennsylvania, and the spirit of forgiveness the Amish community demonstrated in its aftermath
- Among Wolves (Spanish: Entrelobos) (2010) – Spanish adventure drama film based on the true story of feral child Marcos Rodríguez Pantoja
- Angel of Evil (Italian: Vallanzasca – Gli angeli del male) (2010) – Italian crime film about Italian bank robber and mobster Renato Vallanzasca
- Animal Kingdom (2010) – Australian crime drama film inspired by events which involved the Pettingill criminal family of Melbourne
- Antardwand (Hindi: अंतरद्वन्द) (2010) – Indian Hindi-language crime film based on the cases of groom kidnapping reported in Bihar in India
- The Arbor (2010) – British biographical film about Andrea Dunbar
- The Assault (French: L'Assaut) (2010) – French action thriller film based on the 1994 hijacking of Air France Flight 8969 by Algerian Islamic fundamentalist terrorists and the raid to free the hostages by the GIGN, the elite counter-terrorism unit of the French National Gendarmerie
- The Bang Bang Club (2010) – Canadian-South African biographical drama film based on the lives of four photojournalists active within the townships of South Africa during apartheid, especially between 1990 and 1994
- Belgrano (2010) – Argentine biographical adventure drama television film based on the life of the Argentine national hero Manuel Belgrano
- Beneath Hill 60 (2010) – Australian war drama film set during World War I, telling the story of the 1st Australian Tunnelling Company's efforts in mining underneath Hill 60 in the Ypres Salient on the Western Front, during the war, a series of mines filled with explosive charges were placed beneath the German lines to aid the advance of British troops
- Bernhard, Scoundrel of Orange (Dutch: Bernhard, schavuit van Oranje) (2010) – Dutch biographical drama miniseries depicting the life of Prince Bernhard of Lippe-Biesterfeld
- Black Venus (French: Vénus noire) (2010) – French drama film based on the life of Sarah Baartman, a Khoikhoi woman who in the early 19th century was exhibited in Europe under the name "Hottentot Venus"
- Blood Done Sign My Name (2010) – drama film based on the autobiographical book Blood Done Sign My Name (2004) by historian Timothy Tyson
- Bond of Silence (2010) – thriller drama television film based on the 1997 Murder of Bob Hutchinson in Squamish, British Columbia
- Bonded by Blood (2010) – British crime film loosely based on the Rettendon murders in 1995
- The Breath of Heaven (German: Der Atem des Himmels) (2010) – Austrian biographical disaster film based on the worst avalanche catastrophe in Alpine history
- Bruce Lee, My Brother (Cantonese: 李小龍) (2010) – Hong Kong biographical martial arts film based on the life of Bruce Lee from his teenage years through part of his adult years
- Burke & Hare (2010) – British black comedy film, loosely based on the Burke and Hare murders in 1828
- Carlos (2010) – French-German biographical miniseries about the life of the 1970s Venezuelan terrorist Carlos the Jackal
- Casino Jack (2010) – biographical crime drama film focusing on the career of Washington, D.C. lobbyist and businessman Jack Abramoff, who was involved in a massive corruption scandal that led to his conviction as well as the conviction of two White House officials
- Caterpillar (Japanese: キャタピラー) (2010) – Japanese drama film depicting a critique of the right-wing militarist nationalism that guided Japan's conduct in Asia during the Second Sino-Japanese War and World War II
- Centurion (2010) – British historical action film loosely based on the disappearance of the Roman Empire's Ninth Legion in Caledonia in the early second century AD
- The Chameleon (2010) – Canadian-French-American biographical drama film based upon the true story of Frédéric Bourdin who impersonated a missing child named Nicholas Barclay in San Antonio, Texas, in the 1990s
- Chico Xavier (2010) – Brazilian drama film about the Brazilian medium Chico Xavier
- The Client List (2010) – drama television film based on the Odessa, Texas prostitution scandal of 2004
- The Clinic (2010) – Australian horror thriller film following six abducted women and their newborn babies, according to the poster it's "inspired by true events"
- Cold Fish (Japanese: 冷たい熱帯魚) (2010) – Japanese crime drama film about a quiet and unambitious owner of a tropical fish shop whose life and family are taken over by a fellow fish entrepreneur who happens to be a serial killer, loosely based on the exploits of two Tokyo serial killers, Sekine Gen and Hiroko Kazama, a husband and wife duo who owned a pet shop and murdered at least four people
- Confucius (Mandarin: 孔子) (2010) – Chinese biographical drama film depicting the life of Confucius
- The Conspirator (2010) – mystery historical drama film telling the story of Mary Sturratt, the only female conspirator charged in the assassination of Abraham Lincoln and the first woman to be executed by the United States federal government
- Conviction (2010) – biographical legal drama film based on the story of a single mother, Betty Anne Waters, who goes to law school so she can become her brother Kenny's attorney after Kenny is wrongly convicted of murder
- Cornelis (2010) – Swedish biographical drama film about the life of the musician Cornelis Vreeswijk
- Crook (Hindi: क्रूक) (2010) – Indian Hindi-language action thriller film based on the controversy regarding the allegedly racial attacks on Indian students in Australia between 2007 and 2010
- Cyrus: Mind of a Serial Killer (2010) – thriller horror film based on real events regarding a serial killer by the name of Cyrus
- D.C. Sniper (2010) – thriller drama film based on the Beltway sniper attacks of October 2002 committed by John Allen Muhammad and Lee Boyd Malvo
- Dear Mr. Gacy (2010) – Canadian thriller drama film based on the book The Last Victim by Jason Moss
- Death and Glory in Changde (Mandarin: 喋血孤城) (2010) – Chinese war film based on the events in the Battle of Changde in 1943 during the Second Sino-Japanese War
- Dersimiz: Atatürk (2010) – Turkish biographical film based on the life of Mustafa Kemal Atatürk
- Dumas (French: L'Autre Dumas) (2010) – French biographical drama film about 19th-century French author Alexandre Dumas
- Eat Pray Love (2010) – biographical romantic drama film starring Julia Roberts as Elizabeth Gilbert, based on Gilbert's 2006 memoir of the same name
- The End Is My Beginning (German: Das Ende ist mein Anfang) (2010) – German-Italian biographical drama film based on the posthumous autobiographical best-seller with the same name written by Tiziano Terzani
- The Enlightener (Indonesian: Sang Pencerah) (2010) – Indonesian biographical film about Ahmad Dahlan and how he came to found the Islamic organisation Muhammadiyah
- The Esmeralda 1879 (Spanish: La Esmeralda 1879) (2010) – Chilean historical drama film about the naval Battle of Iquique, which took place on May 21, 1879, in the harbor of this coastal town in the Tarapacá Region
- Even the Rain (Spanish: También la lluvia) (2010) – Spanish-Mexican-French drama film based on real events in the year 2000, the Cochabamba Water War, when the population of one of the poorest nations in South America rose up against a powerful American company, Bechtel, and recovered a basic good: water
- The Experiment (2010) – thriller drama film about an experiment which resembles Philip Zimbardo's Stanford prison experiment in 1971, the film is a remake of the 2001 German film Das Experiment
- Extraordinary Measures (2010) – medical drama film based on the story of John Crowley and Aileen Crowley, whose children have Pompe disease
- Fair Game (2010) – biographical political drama film based on Valerie Plame's 2007 memoir Fair Game and Joseph C. Wilson's 2004 memoir The Politics of Truth
- The Fighter (2010) – biographical sports drama film based on the life of boxer Micky Ward and his half-brother, Dicky Eklund
- The First Grader (2010) – British-American-Kenyan biographical drama film based on the true story of Kimani Maruge, a Kenyan farmer who enrolled in elementary school at the age of 84 following the Kenyan government's announcement of free universal primary education in 2003
- Fortress of War (Russian: Брестская крепость) (2010) – Russian-Belarusian war film recounting the June 1941 defense of Brest Fortress against invading Wehrmacht forces in the opening stages of Operation Barbarossa, Nazi Germany's invasion of the Soviet Union during World War II
- Frankie & Alice (2010) – Canadian drama film based on a true story about a popular go-go dancer/stripper in the 1970s who has dissociative identity disorder
- Gainsbourg: A Heroic Life (French: Gainsbourg (Vie héroïque)) (2010) – French biographical drama film based on the life of French singer Serge Gainsbourg
- The Great Vazquez (Spanish: El gran Vázquez) (2010) – Spanish biographical comedy drama film about Manuel Vázquez Gallego
- Green Zone (2010) – British action thriller film depicting the events from the end of the invasion phase of the 2003 invasion of Iraq until the transfer of power to the Iraqis
- The Hammer (2010) – biographical film about Matt Hamill, a deaf wrestler and mixed martial artist
- Henry of Navarre (German: Henri 4) (2010) – German historical film about the life of Henry IV of France
- Hildalgo: The Untold Story (Spanish: Hidalgo: La historia jamás contada) (2010) – Mexican historical biographical film about Miguel Hidalgo y Costilla and his part in the Mexican War of Independence
- Holy Rollers (2010) – crime drama film inspired by a true story of a young Hasidic man who was lured into the world of international drug trafficking in the late 1990s
- Howl (2010) – biographical film exploring both the 1955 Six Gallery debut and the 1957 obscenity trial of 20th-century American poet Allen Ginsberg's noted poem "Howl"
- I Am Sindhutai Sapkal (Marathi: मी सिंधुताई सपकाळ) (2010) – Indian Marathi-language biographical film about Sindhutai Sapkal, a woman who became a social activist after a traumatic life
- I Am Slave (2010) – British biographical television film mostly based on the experiences of Mende Nazer, a Sudanese author, human rights activist and a former slave in Sudan and London
- Ip Man 2 (Cantonese: 葉問2:宗師傳奇) (2010) – Hong Kong biographical martial arts film based on the life of Ip Man, a grandmaster of the martial art Wing Chun, and the story of him in Hong Kong
- Iron Lord (Russian: Ярослав. Тысячу лет назад) (2010) – Russian historical adventure film telling the true story of Yaroslav the Wise
- Janie Jones (2010) – drama film about a fading, alcoholic rock star meeting his daughter for the first time after being left by her drugged-up mother, and the growing relationship they have while on tour, Rosenthal based the film's storyline on his real-life meeting with his own daughter
- Jew Suss: Rise and Fall (German: Jud Süss – Film ohne Gewissen) (2010) – German historical drama film dramatizing the creative process behind the antisemitic Nazi propaganda film Jud Süß (1940)
- Kajínek (2010) – Czech action drama film based on the story of Jiří Kajínek, who managed to escape from a strictly guarded prison in the Mírov fortress
- Keep Your Head Up, Kid: The Don Cherry Story (2010) – Canadian biographical miniseries about Don Cherry
- Khelein Hum Jee Jaan Sey (Hindi: खेलें हम जी जान से) (2010) – Indian Hindi-language historical action film based on Chittagong uprising of 1930
- King of Devil's Island (French: Les Révoltés de l'île du Diable; (Norwegian: Kongen av Bastøy) (2010) – French-Norwegian action drama film depicting a fictionalized retelling of a rebellion among the youth at the Bastøy Reform School in May 1915
- The Kingdom of Solomon (Persian: ملک سلیمان)(2010) – Iranian religious historical film based on the Islamic accounts of Solomon's prophetic life extracted from the Qur'an
- The King's Speech (2010) – British historical drama film based on King George VI, who suffered from a severe stammer and his friendship with Lionel Logue, an Australian speech and language therapist
- The Legend Is Born: Ip Man (Cantonese: 葉問前傳) (2010) – Hong Kong biographical martial arts film based on the early life of the Wing Chun grandmaster Ip Man
- Lennon Naked (2010) – British biographical television film focusing on the life of John Lennon between 1967 and 1971
- Leonie (Japanese: レオニー) (2010) – Japanese biographical film based on the life of Léonie Gilmour, the American lover and editorial assistant of Japanese writer Yone Noguchi and mother of sculptor Isamu Noguchi and dancer Ailes Gilmour
- Letters to God (2010) – Christian drama film based on the true story of Tyler Doughtie, an 8-year-old suffering from cancer with a love of writing and sending letters to God
- Lope (2010) – Spanish–Brazilian adventure drama film inspired by the youth of Lope de Vega
- Lost Loves (Khmer: ឃ្លាតទៅសែនឆ្ងាយ) (2010) – Cambodian drama film about Leav Sila, one of countless people that struggled to survive during the years of the Khmer Rouge regime
- Love Ranch (2010) – drama film based on the lives of Joe Conforte and Sally Conforte, a married couple who operated the first legal brothel in the United States, the Mustang Ranch in Storey County, Nevada
- Made in Dagenham (2010) – British comedy drama film dramatizing the Ford sewing machinists strike of 1968 that aimed for equal pay for women
- Mahler on the Couch (German: Mahler auf der Couch) (2010) – German historical drama film depicting an affair between Alma Mahler and Walter Gropius, and the subsequent psychoanalysis of Mahler's husband Gustav Mahler by Sigmund Freud
- Malik Ek (Hindi: मलिक एक) (2010) – Indian Hindi-language biographical film about Sai Baba of Shirdi
- Max Schmeling (2010) – German sports biographical film telling the story of German boxing icon Max Schmeling
- Meek's Cutoff (2010) – Western film loosely based on a historical incident on the Oregon Trail in 1845, in which frontier guide Stephen Meek led a wagon train on an ill-fated journey through the Oregon desert along the route later known as the Meek Cutoff in the western United States
- Miral (2010) – biographical political film chronicling Hind Husseini's effort to establish an orphanage in Jerusalem after the 1948 Arab–Israeli War, the Deir Yassin Massacre and the establishment of the state of Israel
- Mo (2010) – British biographical television film about the later life and career of the British Labour Party politician Mo Mowlam
- Montevideo, God Bless You! (Serbian: Монтевидео, Бог те видео!) (2010) – Serbian sports comedy film based on the events leading to the participation of the Yugoslavia national football team at the first FIFA World Cup in Montevideo, Uruguay in July 1930
- Mozart's Sister (French: Nannerl, la sœur de Mozart) (2010) – French historical drama film presenting a fictional account of the early life of Maria Anna Mozart, nicknamed Nannerl, who was the sister of Wolfgang Amadeus Mozart and his only sibling to survive infancy
- Mr. Nice (2010) – British-Spanish crime drama film loosely based on the Welsh former drug smuggler turned author, Howard Marks, who achieved notoriety through high-profile court cases
- My Name Is Khan (Hindi: मेरा नाम खान है) (2010) – Indian-British-Chinese social drama film centering on Rizwan Khan, an autistic Muslim man who tries to meet the president of the United States and convince him that he is not a terrorist to win his wife back
- Nainsukh (2010) – Indian-Swiss biographical film based on the life and works of Nainsukh, an 18th-century Indian miniature painter
- Nanga Parbat (2010) – German biographical drama film about Reinhold and Günther Messner, who climbed Nanga Parbat
- Nokas (2010) – Norwegian heist film portraying the real life NOKAS robbery that took place in Stavanger, Norway in 2004
- Of Gods and Men (French: Des hommes et des dieux) (2010) – French drama film based on the assassination of the monks of Tibhirine
- Once Upon a Time in Mumbaai (2010) – Indian Hindi-language neo-noir crime thriller film loosely based on the lives of Mumbai underworld gangsters Haji Mastan and Dawood Ibrahim
- Once Upon a Time the City of Fools (Italian: C'era una volta la città dei matti...) (2010) – Italian biographical television film about the activities of Franco Basaglia who revolutionized Italian psychiatry and shows the degrading situation that existed in Italian psychiatric hospitals before the passing of Basaglia Law
- Oranges and Sunshine (2010) – Australian-British biographical drama film based on the true story of Margaret Humphreys, a social worker from Nottingham who uncovered the scandal of "home children", a scheme of forcibly relocating poor children from the United Kingdom to Australia and Canada
- The Pacific (2010) – war drama miniseries focusing on the United States Marine Corps's actions in the Pacific Theater of Operations within the wider Pacific War
- Picco (2010) – German psychological crime film about the torture murder in the Siegburg correctional facility in autumn 2006
- Piché: The Landing of a Man (French: Piché, entre ciel et terre) (2010) – Canadian French-language drama film based on the true story of Robert Piché, an airline pilot who successfully landed Air Transat Flight 236 in the Azores after the plane lost engine power mid-air
- Portrait of the Fighter as a Young Man (Romanian: Portretul luptătorului la tinerețe) (2010) – Romanian drama film centered on the figure of Ion Gavrilă Ogoranu, a member of the fascist and anti-Semitic Iron Guard
- The Pregnancy Pact (2010) – teen drama television film based on the allegedly true story of a 2008 media circus surrounding a large group of teen girls at the Gloucester High School, Gloucester, Massachusetts, who allegedly agreed to concurrently get pregnant, give birth and raise their children communally
- Princess (Finnish: Prinsessa) (2010) – Finnish biographical film based on the life of Anna Lappalainen
- The Princess of Eboli (Spanish: La princesa de Éboli) (2010) – Spanish historical drama miniseries about the woman of the same name
- Rakta Charitra (2010) – Indian political biographical crime film based on the life of political leader and factionist Paritala Ravindra
- Restless Heart: The Confessions of Saint Augustine (Italian: Sant'Agostino) (2010) – Italian-German historical miniseries chronicling the life of St. Augustine, the early Christian theologian, writer and Bishop of Hippo Regius at the time of the Vandal invasion (AD 430)
- Revolution: The Crusade of the Andes (Spanish: Revolución: el cruce de los Andes) (2010) – Argentine historical epic film that follows the life of José de San Martín, with focus on the Crossing on the Andes
- Risen (2010) – Welsh sports drama film about the Welsh boxer Howard Winstone
- The Road to Coronation Street (2010) – British biographical television film dramatizing the creation of Coronation Street, the UK's longest-running television soap opera, from conception to its first transmission in December 1960
- The Road to Freedom (2010) – American-Cambodian historical film inspired by the real-life story of photojournalist Sean Flynn, the son of Errol Flynn, who disappeared with fellow photojournalist Dana Stone in Cambodia in 1970
- The Robber (German: Der Räuber) (2010) – German drama film based on a novel by Austrian author Martin Prinz the novel's character is based on Austrian bank-robber and runner Johann Kastenberger
- The Round Up (French: La Rafle) (2010) – French historical war drama film based on the true story of a young Jewish boy, the film depicts the Vel' d'Hiv Roundup (Rafle du Vel' d'Hiv), the mass arrest of Jews by French police who were accomplices of Nazi Germans in Paris in July 1942
- The Runaways (2010) – biographical drama film based on the 1970s all-girl rock band The Runaways, focusing in particular on the relationship between rockers Cherie Currie and Joan Jett, adapted from Currie's memoir
- The Secret Diaries of Miss Anne Lister (2010) – British biographical historical drama television film about 19th-century Yorkshire landowner Anne Lister
- Secretariat (2010) – biographical sports drama film based on the story of a Thoroughbred named Secretariat, who won the Triple Crown in the Belmont Stakes and still holds the record after 37 years, and his owner, Penny Chenery
- Sex & Drugs & Rock & Roll (2010) – British biographical film about English new wave musician Ian Dury
- The Silent House (Spanish: La Casa Muda) (2010) – Uruguayan horror film allegedly inspired by real events that took place in the 1940s
- The Sinking of the Laconia (2010) – British historical miniseries about the Laconia incident; the sinking of the British ocean liner RMS Laconia during World War II by a German U-boat, which then, together with three other U-boats and an Italian submarine, rescued the passengers but was in turn attacked by an American bomber
- The Social Network (2010) – biographical drama film based on the creation, and lawsuits of Facebook
- Space Dogs (Russian: Белка и Стрелка. Звёздные собаки) (2010) – Russian computer-animated adventure comedy film based on the Soviet space dogs Belka and Strelka
- The Special Relationship (2010) – British-American political drama film based on relationship between British prime minister Tony Blair and U.S. president Bill Clinton
- Temple Grandin (2010) – biographical drama film about Temple Grandin, a woman with autism who revolutionized practices for the inhumane handling of livestock on cattle ranches and slaughterhouses
- Times You Change (German: Zeiten ändern dich) (2010) – German biographical film based on Bushido's 2008 autobiography
- Tito (2010) – Croatian historical miniseries about Yugoslav leader Josip Broz Tito
- Toast (2010) – British biographical comedy drama film based on the autobiographical novel of the same name by the cookery writer Nigel Slater
- Tropic of Blood (Spanish: Trópico de sangre) (2010) – Dominican historical film based on the true story of the Dominican Republic's heroic Mirabal sisters
- True Heroes (Spanish: Héroes verdaderos) (2010) – Mexican animated biographical adventure film chronicling the adventures of the heroes of Mexicans independence Miguel Hidalgo and José María Morelos
- Unstoppable (2010) – disaster action thriller film loosely based on the CSX 8888 incident, which tells the story of a runaway train carrying hazardous material, which puts cities and people in danger
- Veda (2010) – Turkish biographical film based on the memoirs of Salih Bozok, which traces the life of Mustafa Kemal Atatürk
- VIPs (2010) – Brazilian biographical drama film about Marcelo Nascimento Rocha, a criminal who was famous for impersonating several people, among them one of the owners of the Gol airline and one of the leaders of the PCC criminal faction
- The Way Back (2010) – survival film depicting the true story of seven men who escape from prison in Siberia (after being held by Stalin), then walk through the Gobi Desert, Himalayas and all the way to Sikkim, India
- When Love Is Not Enough: The Lois Wilson Story (2010) – biographical television film based on Lois Wilson and the true story of her husband's alcoholism and her subsequent finding of Al-Anon
- The Whistleblower (2010) – Canadian biographical thriller film which tells the story of Kathryn Bolkovac, a Nebraska police officer who was recruited to serve as a U.N. peacekeeper with DynCorp International in post-war Bosnia and Herzegovina in 1999
- White Gold (2010) – South African historical drama film revolving around the experiences of Indian indentured labourers recruited for the sugar plantations of the 19th-century Colony of Natal
- Who Is Clark Rockefeller? (2010) – police procedural television film based on the life of Christian Gerhartsreiter, a German con artist who for years impersonated many people, at one point claiming to be part of the Rockefeller family going by the faux name "Clark Rockefeller"
- Worried About the Boy (2010) – British biographical drama television film based on the life of English singer Boy George
- The Wronged Man (2010) – biographical television film about a single mother with a haunting past, based on a true story
- Yamada: The Samurai of Ayothaya (Thai: ซามูไร อโยธยา) (2010) – Thai action film based on Yamada Nagamasa, a Japanese adventurer who later became a governor in the Ayutthaya Kingdom
- You Don't Know Jack (2010) – biographical television film based in part on the book Between the Dying and the Dead: Dr. Jack Kevorkian's Life and the Battle To Legalize Euthanasia, focusing on the life and work of physician-assisted suicide advocate Jack Kevorkian
- Young Goethe in Love (German: Goethe!) (2010) – German historical drama film depicting a fictionalized version of the early years of the poet Johann Wolfgang von Goethe and the events forming the basis of his novel The Sorrows of Young Werther
- Yugapurushan (Malayalam: യുഗപുരുഷൻ) (2010) – Indian biographical film about the life and times of Sree Narayana Guru
- The Zero Hour (Spanish: La hora cero) (2010) – Venezuelan action film based on the events during the 1996 Venezuelan medical strike
