= Eduardo Corletti =

Argentinian boxer

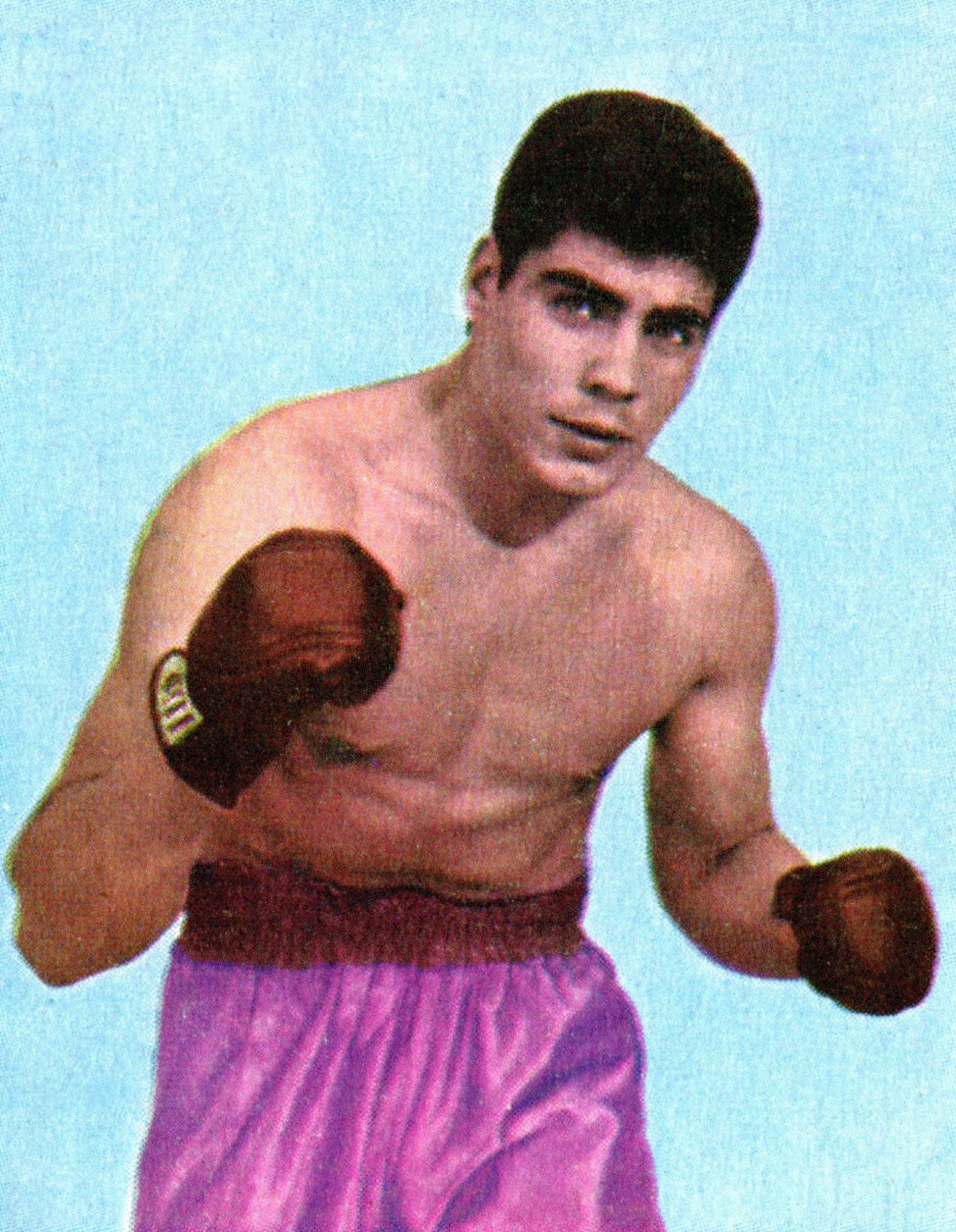

Personal information
- Nickname: Gato
- Born: 14 August 1941 (age 85) Quilmes, Argentina
- Height: 1.82 m (6 ft 0 in)
- Weight: Heavyweight

Boxing career
- Stance: Orthodox

Boxing record
- Total fights: 51
- Wins: 32
- Win by KO: 17
- Losses: 14
- Draws: 5
Medal record
Representing Argentina
Pan American Games
Silver medal – second place	1959 Chicago	+81 kg

Héctor Eduardo Corletti (born 14 August 1941) is a retired Argentinian heavyweight boxer. As an amateur he won a silver medal at the 1959 Pan American Games and finished ninth at the 1960 Summer Olympics. Next year he turned professional and in 1969 won the South American heavyweight title. He retired in 1973 after a series of eight losses.

== Boxing career ==
Eduardo fought such fighters as 'White Hope' Jerry Quarry, Joe Bugner, George Chuvalo, and Al 'Blue' Lewis. All of these fighters were of a high caliber except Blue Lewis. Eduardo lost to all of these fighters except Chuvalo.

The first of these was a bout against George Chuvalo in 1966. Eduardo won by decision in an upset. This and a victory over Billy Walker gave him a world ranking. Two years later, in 1968, he fought in a losing effort against Blue Lewis. He was billed as English until this loss. In 1970 Eduardo lost to Bugner, and in 1972 was bested by Jerry Quarry. All of these fights went the distance except the Quarry fight, in which Quarry scored a first-round knockout. He also lost in a rematch against Lewis by a knockout in 2 rounds.

== Professional boxing record ==
53 fights	32 wins	16 losses
By knockout	17	11
By decision	15	5
Draws	5	

No.	Result	Record	Opponent	Type	Round, time	Date	Location	Notes
53	Loss	32–16–5	Koroseta Kid	KO	4 (10), 0:49	31 Mar 1973	Conroy Bowl Schofield Barracks, Honolulu, Hawaii, U.S.	
52	Loss	32–15–5	Fred Lewis	TKO	6 (10), 0:50	11 Jan 1973	Sahara Tahoe Hotel, Stateline, Nevada, U.S.	
51	Loss	32–14–5	Terry Hinke	TKO	7 (10)	2 Jun 1972	Community Center, Carson City, Nevada, U.S.	
50	Loss	32–13–5	Jerry Quarry	KO	1 (10), 2:58	17 Apr 1972	Forum, Inglewood, California, U.S.	
49	Loss	32–12–5	Steve Carter	SD	10	21 Mar 1972	Civic Auditorium, San Francisco, California, U.S.	
48	Loss	32–11–5	Santiago Lovell Jr.	RTD	5 (10)	1 Aug 1971	Temperley, Distrito Federal, Argentina	
47	Loss	32–10–5	Miguel Ángel Paez	TKO	11 (12)	4 Apr 1971	Temperley, Distrito Federal, Argentina	Lost Argentine heavyweight title
46	Loss	32–9–5	Joe Bugner	PTS	10	6 Oct 1970	Royal Albert Hall, London, England	
45	Win	32–8–5	Julio Álvarez	KO	7 (10)	22 Jul 1970	Temperley, Distrito Federal, Argentina	
44	Win	31–8–5	Óscar Wondryk	TKO	10 (10)	9 May 1970	Vicuña Mackenna, Córdoba Province, Argentina	
43	Win	30–8–5	Felipe Marich	PTS	10	10 Apr 1970	Temperley, Distrito Federal, Argentina	
42	Win	29–8–5	Felipe Marich	PTS	10	18 Feb 1970	Estadio Luna Park, Buenos Aires, Argentina	
41	Loss	28–8–5	Miguel Ángel Paez	KO	4 (10)	25 Oct 1969	Estadio Luna Park, Buenos Aires, Argentina	
40	Loss	28–7–5	Miguel Ángel Paez	UD	10	24 Sep 1969	Mar del Plata, Buenos Aires Province, Argentina	
39	Win	28–6–5	Luís Faustino Pires	PTS	12	7 Jun 1969	Estadio Luna Park, Buenos Aires, Argentina	Won South American heavyweight title
38	Win	27–6–5	Santiago Lovell Jr.	PTS	12	14 Dec 1968	Estadio Luna Park, Buenos Aires, Argentina	Won vacant Argentine heavyweight title
37	Win	26–6–5	Roy Wallace	UD	10	8 Nov 1968	Civic Auditorium, San Jose, California, U.S.	
36	loss	25–6–5	Roger Rischer	SD	10	16 Sep 1968	Civic Auditorium, San Francisco, California, U.S.	
35	Loss	25–5–5	Alvin Lewis	TKO	2 (10)	24 Jul 1968	Olympia Stadium, Detroit, Michigan, U.S.	
34	Win	25–4–5	Bob Stallings	PTS	10	5 Apr 1968	Frölundaborg, Gothenburg, Sweden	
33	Win	24–4–5	Francisco San José	TKO	5 (10)	22 Mar 1968	Palazzetto dello Sport, Bologna, Italy	
32	Win	23–4–5	Benito Penna	TKO	7 (10)	2 Dec 1967	Rome, Lazio, Italy	
31	Win	22–4–5	Everett Copeland	KO	5 (10)	17 Nov 1967	PalaRuffini, Turin, Italy	
30	Win	21–4–5	Ski Goldstein	KO	2 (10)	10 Nov 1967	Rome, Lazio, Italy	
29	Win	20–4–5	Johnny Prescott	PTS	10	17 Oct 1967	Royal Albert Hall, London, England	
28	Win	19–4–5	Gerry de Bruyn	PTS	10	15 May 1967	King's Hall, Manchester, England	
27	Win	18–4–5	Joe Bygraves	PTS	10	20 Mar 1967	Hilton Hotel (Anglo American SC), London, England	
26	Win	17–4–5	Roberto Véliz	PTS	10	5 Nov 1966	Buenos Aires, Distrito Federal, Argentina	
25	Win	16–4–5	José Giorgetti	PTS	10	1 Oct 1966	Estadio Luna Park, Buenos Aires, Argentina	
24	Win	15–4–5	Alberto Benassi	PTS	10	16 Aug 1966	Necochea, Buenos Aires Province, Argentina	
23	Win	14–4–5	Silvestre Serena	TKO	6 (10)	16 Jul 1966	Temperley, Distrito Federal, Argentina	
22	Win	13–4–5	Telmo González	TKO	2 (10)	3 Jun 1966	Tres Arroyos, Distrito Federal, Argentina	
21	Win	12–4–5	George Chuvalo	PTS	10	25 Jan 1966	Olympia, London, England	
20	Win	11–4–5	Billy Walker	TKO	8 (10)	19 Oct 1965	Empire Pool, London, England	
19	Draw	10–4–5	Billy Walker	PTS	10	19 Aug 1965	Teatro Ariston, Sanremo, Italy	
18	Loss	10–4–4	Oscar Bonavena	KO	1 (12)	23 Jul 1965	Córdoba, Córdoba Province, Argentina	
17	Draw	10–3–4	Benito Penna	PTS	10	14 Jun 1965	Piacenza, Emilia-Romagna, Italy	
16	Draw	10–3–3	Albert Westphal	PTS	10	27 Mar 1965	Stadthalle, Wolfsburg, West Germany	
15	Win	10–3–2	Roberto Bracco	PTS	6	18 Mar 1965	Palazzo dello Sport (Pad. 3 Fiera), Milan, Italy	
14	Draw	9–3–2	Dante Cane'	PTS	6	12 Feb 1965	Bologna, Emilia-Romagna, Italy	
13	Loss	9–3–1	Giorgio Masteghin	TKO	6 (10)	12 Nov 1964	Milan, Lombardy, Italy	
12	Loss	9–2–1	Ray Patterson	TKO	5 (6)	9 Oct 1964	Masshallen, Gothenburg, Sweden	
11	Win	9–1–1	Gianfranco Tommasini	TKO	2 (8)	19 Sep 1964	Milan, Lombardy, Italy	
10	Win	8–1–1	Helmut Ball	TKO	7 (10)	29 Aug 1964	Stadthalle, Wolfsburg, West Germany	
9	Draw	7–1–1	Celio Turrini	PTS	6	29 Jul 1964	Rome, Lazio, Italy	
8	Win	7–1	Colombo Lorenzi	TKO	2 (6)	26 Jun 1964	Turin, Piedmont, Italy	
7	Win	6–1	Bruno Segura	KO	2 (10)	3 Apr 1964	Temperley, Distrito Federal, Argentina	
6	Win	5–1	Telmo González	TKO	2 (10)	8 Nov 1963	San Nicolás, Distrito Federal, Argentina	
5	Loss	4–1	Walter dos Santos	PTS	8	12 Oct 1963	Auditório da TV-Excelsior, Rio de Janeiro, Brazil	
4	Win	4–0	Julio López	TKO	3 (10)	1 Dec 1962	Buenos Aires, Distrito Federal, Argentina	
3	Win	3–0	Rogelio Fernando Gregorutti	TKO	6 (10)	19 Sep 1969	Estadio Luna Park, Buenos Aires, Argentina	
2	Win	2–0	Osvaldo Besares	TKO	3 (10)	20 Jan 1962	Temperley, Distrito Federal, Argentina	
1	Win	1–0	Aurelio Díaz	PTS	10	23 Dec 1961	Temperley, Distrito Federal, Argentina	
