= The Naked Mountain =

2002 book by Reinhold Messner

- Author: Reinhold Messner
- Original title: Der nackte Berg
- Translator: Tim Carruthers
- Language: German
- Publisher: Malik
- Publication date: 2002
- Publication place: Germany
- English publication date: 2003
- Pages: 317
- ISBN: 9783890292113

The Naked Mountain: Nanga Parbat – Brother, Death, Solitude (German: Der nackte Berg. Nanga Parbat – Bruder, Tod und Einsamkeit) is a 2002 memoir by the Italian mountaineer Reinhold Messner. It is about Messner's 1970 ascent of Nanga Parbat, one of the major peaks of the Himalayas, which began his career in Himalayan climbing but also resulted in the death of his brother Günther.

== See also ==
- Nanga Parbat, a 2010 drama film about the same events
