= Muhammad Ali vs. Al Lewis =

Muhammad Ali boxing match in 1972

- Date: 19 July 1972
- Venue: Croke Park, Dublin, Ireland

Tale of the tape
Boxer	(United States) Muhammad Ali	(United States) Alvin Lewis
Nickname	"The Greatest"	"Blue"
Hometown	Louisville, Kentucky, U.S.	Detroit, Michigan, U.S.
Pre-fight record	37–1 (26 KO)	26–4 (16 KO)
Age	30 years, 6 months	29 years, 8 months
Height	6 ft 3 in (191 cm)	6 ft 3 in (191 cm)
Weight	218 lb (99 kg)	224 lb (102 kg)
Style	Orthodox	Orthodox
Recognition	Former undisputed heavyweight champion	

Result
- Ali won by an 11th round TKO

Muhammad Ali vs. Alvin Lewis was a professional boxing match contested in Croke Park, Dublin, Ireland on 19 July 1972.

== Background ==
Killorglin-born circus strongman and publican, Michael "Butty" Sugrue, put up £300,000 to persuade Ali to face his former sparring partner Alvin Lewis at Croke Park.

== The fight ==
Ali won the bout through a technical knockout in the 11th round.

== Aftermath ==
A 2012 Irish television documentary called When Ali Came to Ireland presented the story of Ali's visit to Ireland.

This was the last boxing event held at Croke Park until 5 September 2026, when an estimated 83,000 fans watched a card main-evented by the retirement fight of Irish women's boxing icon Katie Taylor. She would retire as the undisputed super lightweight champion after defeating Flora Pili by unanimous decision.

== Undercard ==
Confirmed bouts:

== Broadcasting ==
Country	Broadcaster
Mexico	Telesistema Mexicano
Philippines	ABS-CBN
United Kingdom	BBC

Preceded by vs. Jerry Quarry II	Muhammad Ali's bouts 19 July 1972	Succeeded by vs. Floyd Patterson II
Preceded by vs. Oscar Bonavena	Alvin Lewis's bouts 19 July 1972	Succeeded by vs. Charlie Reno
