= When Ali Came to Ireland =

Documentary film (2013) about a Muhammad Ali boxing fight (1972) in Ireland

- Ali during a 1972 interview in Ireland
- Directed by: Ross Whitaker
- Starring: Muhammad Ali; Alvin Lewis; Cathal O'Shannon; Jimmy Magee
- Country of origin: Ireland
- Original language: English

Production
- Producer: Aideen O'Sullivan
- Running time: 50 minutes
- Production company: True Films

Original release
- Network: RTÉ One
- Release: 1 January 2013

When Ali Came to Ireland is a 2013 Irish documentary film directed by Ross Whitaker. It tells the story of how Killorglin-born circus strongman and publican Michael "Butty" Sugrue put up £300,000 and persuaded the renowned American boxing champion Muhammad Ali to make his first visit to Ireland to fight against Alvin Lewis in Croke Park, Dublin in 1972.

Ali went to Ireland with an entourage on 11 July 1972 to spend time training for the fight on the 19th. While there, he was interviewed at length for RTÉ Television by Cathal O'Shannon, and was taught the rudiments of hurling (an Irish stick-and-ball field sport) by the champion hurler, Eddie Keher. He visited Leinster House, seat of the Irish parliament, where he was mobbed by politicians and parliamentary staff, alike, and he signed many autographs. The taoiseach (Irish prime minister) Jack Lynch conversed with him for half an hour. Lynch was surprised to learn that he was the first Western head of government to invite Ali for an official visit to parliament. The taoiseach later attended the fight itself.

Ali revealed to the media that, apart from winning the fight, his main ambition in Ireland was to meet the Northern Irish member of parliament, Bernadette Devlin, whom he admired. He wanted to talk about her politics, philosophy, and aims in public life. Devlin visited Ali's camp for a few hours on the day of the fight and had lunch with him. That evening, she also attended the fight.

Ali won the Lewis fight, attended by a little over 18,000 people, with a technical knockout in the 11th round, and Butty Sugrue lost a lot of money bankrolling it. The documentary was first broadcast on RTÉ One on New Year's Day, 2013.

Ali returned to Ireland twice in later years. He took part in the opening ceremony of the Special Olympics in Dublin in 2003, and visited the Irish birthplace of his great-grandfather, Abe Grady, in Ennis, County Clare in 2009. Grady had sailed from Ennis to Louisiana in the United States during the 1860s, ultimately settling in Kentucky where he married an emancipated slave woman of unknown name. The couple had a son in about 1887. When Ali visited Ennis in 2009 he was greeted by 10,000 people and was made an honorary freeman of the town.

== Cast ==
- Muhammad Ali
- Butty Sugrue
- Alvin Lewis
- Cathal O'Shannon
- Jimmy Magee
- Rock Brynner
- Eddie Keher
- Dave Hannigan
- George Kimball

== Awards ==
The documentary won the Best Sports Programme award at the 10th Irish Film & Television Awards in 2013.

== See also ==
- List of boxing films
- Muhammad Ali vs. Al Lewis, fight report
