= Karl Herrligkoffer =

German mountaineering expedition organizer (1916–1991)

Karl Maria Herrligkoffer
Personal information
- Born: 13 June 1916 Schweinfurt, Germany
- Died: 9 September 1991 (aged 75) Munich, Germany
- Occupations: Physician, Leader of mountaineering expeditions

Climbing career
- Type of climber: Expedition climbing
- Known for: Leading notable mountaineering expeditions to Nanga Parbat, Broad Peak, K2, Kangchenjunga, and Everest

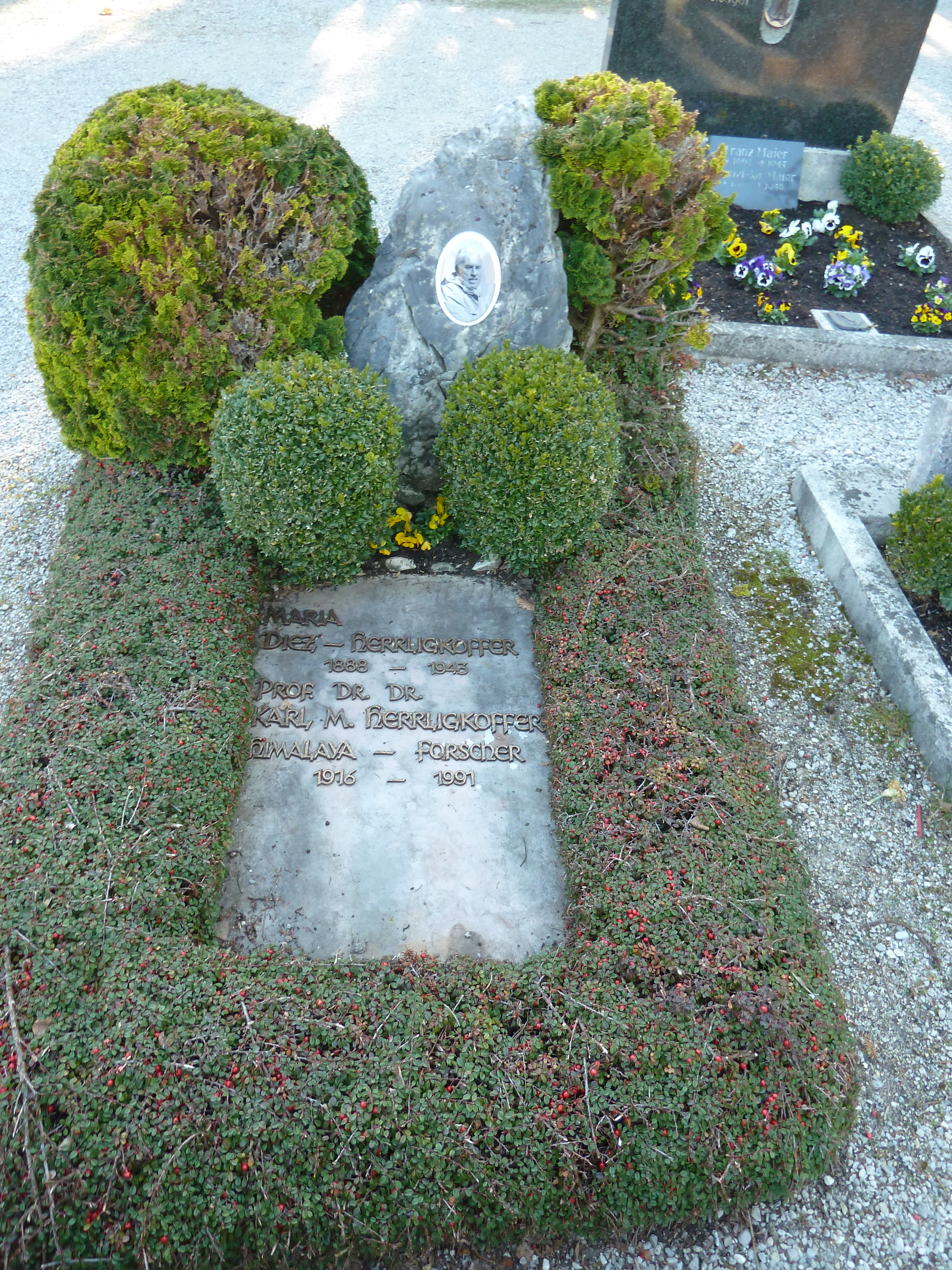
Grave of Karl Maria Herrligkoffer and Maria Diez-Herrligkoffer

Karl Maria Herrligkoffer (13 June 1916, in Schweinfurt – 9 September 1991, in Munich) was a German medical doctor, who from 1953 and 1986, organized and directed numerous German and Austrian mountaineering expeditions including 13 expeditions to five of the world's highest peaks in the Himalayas and the Karakoram. There were some notable successes on these expeditions including the first ascent of Nanga Parbat (8126m) (by the Rakhiot Face), and also the second and third ascent of that mountain (by the Diamir Face and the Rupal Face), the successful ascent of Everest (8849m) by 15 people from one expedition, the first ascent of the South Ridge of K2 (8611m), the first attempt on Broad Peak (8051m), and the first ascent of about 35 peaks during two expeditions to east Greenland.

The expeditions organised by Herrligkoffer gave many mountaineers their first experience of mountaineering in the Greater Ranges, notable examples are Reinhold Messner, Doug Scott and Hermann Buhl; Messner and Scott both went on to receive the Piolet d'Or Lifetime Achievement Award, one of mountaineering's highest honours. Buhl also established a reputation as a notable Himalayan mountaineer, being one of only two people to make the first ascent of two 8000ers and the only person to have made the first ascent of an 8,000-metre peak alone; he was awarded Austrian Sportsman of the Year in 1953 for these achievements.

Many of these expeditions generated significant controversy and in some cases led to legal action between Herrligkoffer and some of the other participants.

== Early life and profession ==
His parents were the railway superintendent Rudolf Herrligkoffer and his wife Therese, née Merkl. In 1920 the family moved to Traunstein. Karl attended the secondary school in Rosenheim. When he decided to become a doctor rather than a forester, as desired by his father, he was disinherited. After graduating from high school, he studied medicine at the Ludwig-Maximilians-Universität München from 1935 to 1940 and then became an assistant doctor there. During the war, he worked at the police hospital in Munich. Afterwards, from 1946 he was a medical practitioner and from 1948 he worked from his own practice in Munich. From 1946 to 1951, he was also studying psychology.

Herrligkoffer had a half-brother Willy Merkl, Willy was 16 years older than Karl, he had made numerous first ascents in Europe and was involved in mountaineering in the Greater Ranges when his younger brother was still a teenager.

== Mountaineering activities ==
Willy Merkl, Herrligkoffer's half-brother, had both initiated and led the German Nanga Parbat expedition in 1934 and had died there with two other German mountaineers and six Sherpas in a ferocious storm. At that time Karl was 19 years old, and the mountaineering ethos of his half-brother became a focus of Herrligkoffer's life, leading him to invest considerable time and energy into the planning, organization, and management of eight-thousander climbs. His repeated expeditions to Nanga Parbat, in 1953, 1961, 1962, 1963, 1964, 1968, 1970, 1975, 1981 and 1982, led one commentator to write that he had "come to cultivate the same attitude toward the mountain, vengeful and obsessive, as had Ahab to his whale".

Because Herrligkoffer never climbed one of the high peaks, instead focusing on financing, preparation, and the organizational management of these expeditions from the base camp, commentators have written that "Herrligkoffer wanted to become a climbing entrepreneur" and have described him as a "climbing impresario".

== Notable expeditions ==
=== Nanga Parbat 1953 - Rakhiot Face: the first ascent of Nanga Parbat ===
The 1953 German–Austrian Nanga Parbat expedition was noteworthy because Hermann Buhl succeeded in making the first ascent of Nanga Parbat (8125m). This was Buhl's first visit to the Greater Ranges. He reached the summit on 3 July, exactly five weeks after Hillary and Tenzing made the first ascent of Everest, the only other 8000m peak which had been ascended at that time was Annapurna.

Karl Herrligkoffer both initiated and led the expedition. It was the first that he had been involved with and it was named the Willy-Merkl Memorial Expedition in commemoration of his half-brother who lost his life in the 1934 Nanga Parbat climbing disaster. The line of ascent started up the Rakhiot face on the north side of the mountain and the base camp was below the face, at Fairy Meadows, the same base camp and line of ascent used when the 1934 expedition made their attempt.

=== 1954 Broad Peak expedition ===
Following the success of Nanga Parbat, Herrligkoffer turned to Broad Peak (8051m) which was one of only four of the 8000m peaks that had not then been attempted. He organized and led the Munich Expedition in the autumn of 1954. The team included three of the 13 Europeans who were with Herrligkoffer on the 1953 Nanga Parbat expedition but Hermann Buhl was not included. An attempt was made on the SW side, up the Broad Peak glacier, this was unsuccessful. However, in 1957 Hermann Buhl was part of a team that made the first ascent of the mountain.

=== 1961 Nanga Parbat expedition - Diamir Face ===
Herrligkoffer's successful 1953 expedition to Nanga Parbat had taken the north-east slopes but in 1961 he led an expedition attempting the peak from the north-west, by the Diamir Face. Nanga Parbat's summit is at 8126m, the climbers reached 7150m, Herrligkoffer's summary closed with the words "...the Diamir flank was reconnoitred and climbed in its entire height. Only the summit assault was prevented by the monsoon".

=== 1962 Nanga Parbat expedition - the first ascent of the Diamir Face and the second ascent of Nanga Parbat ===
Herrligkoffer returned to the Diamir Face of Nanga Parbat in 1962. Most of the 1961 climbing team were present in 1962, they were supplemented by three additional mountaineers who had not previously climbed in the Greater Ranges. On this expedition Toni Kinshofer and Siegi Löw (who had reached the high point on the 1961 expedition), along with Anderl Mannhardt (on his first Himalayan expedition) made the second ever successful ascent of Nanga Parbat and the first by the Diamir Face. At the time, apart from Everest and Cho Oyu, none of the other 8000ers had been ascended more than once (and only Everest had been climbed by a route different from that used on the first ascent). The line taken in 1962 is now generally accepted as the "normal route"; the team's success in 1962 was marred by the death of Siegi Löw who fell on the descent after the three climbers had spent a night on the mountain without shelter at 8080m.

=== 1963 & 1964 Nanga Parbat expedition - Rupal Face ===
In 1963 Herrligkoffer made his fourth visit to Nanga Parbat, this time there were only four members of the team, and their goal was a reconnaissance of the still unclimbed Rupal Face which is on the south side of the mountain. That face is the highest mountain face in the world, it rises over 4.5 km (4,600m, 15,090 ft) above its base. No ascent was attempted in 1963 but the foundations were laid for subsequent expeditions to this side of the mountain.

He returned to the Rupal face early in 1964. This was one of the first attempts on a high Himalayan peak in winter but the choice of season was determined by Herrligkoffer's plans to undertake an Antarctic expedition in autumn 1964, rather than any special mountaineering considerations. Remarkably none of the team, apart from Herrligkoffer, had previously been to the Greater Ranges, even in the less challenging spring/summer months. Climbing took place throughout most of March but a problem with the permits resulted in a premature end to the activities before the team had ascended above 5,800m.

=== 1966 East Greenland expedition - Stauning Alps ===
In 1966 Herrligkoffer led the first of several expeditions that he organized to Greenland, on this occasion, they were climbing in the Stauning Alps and made the first ascent of 25-30 peaks. Apart from Herrligkoffer himself, only two other members of the team had been on any of his earlier expeditions. The summits in Greenland are considerably lower than those encountered on his other expeditions, none being higher than 3700m, in the area of this expedition none are above 3000m.

=== 1968 Nanga Parbat expedition - Rupal Face ===
After a three and half year interlude, Herrligkoffer returned to the Rupal Face with the Toni Kinshofer Memorial Expedition (Kinshofer, who was on the Herrligkoffer 1962 expedition and reached the summit from the Diamir face, had fallen to his death in Germany in 1964). Only two members of the climbing team had previously been on an expedition with Herrligkoffer. Although the expedition was unsuccessful the climbers did reach about 7766m.

=== 1970 Nanga Parbat expedition - the first ascent of the Rupal Face and the third ascent of Nanga Parbat ===
Herrligkoffer's 1970 expedition to the Rupal Face was named the Siegi Löw Memorial Expedition (Löw had died whilst descending the Diamir Face on Herrligkoffer's 1962 expedition). Again there were only two members of the climbing team who had previously been on an expedition with Herrligkoffer; one of those, Peter Scholz, reached the summit along with Felix Kuen, so did Reinhold Messner and his brother Günther; neither of the Messner brothers had previously visited the Greater Ranges and their greatest altitude had been on Reinhold's expedition to the Andes in 1969. This was the first ascent of the unclimbed Rupal Face and only the third ascent of the mountain (the two previous ascents having taken place during Herrligkoffer's expeditions). The Messner brothers started to descend by the Diamir Face after reaching the summit but at some point on the descent Günther was killed in an avalanche, Reinhold completed the first traverse of the mountain. The line of ascent is now generally referred to as the Rupal Direct or Messner Route.

1970 marked the start of the second phase of Himalayan mountaineering, described by Bonington as "the year of the big walls in the Himalaya", and Herrligkoffer's expedition was in the vanguard. At the time that the expedition became established on the wall, in May 1970, the only 8000ers which had been ascended more than once were Everest, Cho Oyu and Nanga Parbat; only Everest and Nanga Parbat had been climbed by a route different from that used on the first ascent (and the new line on the latter had been ascended during Herrligkoffer's 1962 expedition). A month before the success on the Rupal Face, Annapurna was ascended twice (one ascent following the new and technically challenging south face route), and the second ascent of Makalu was also achieved by a new line.

Messner places both the Nanga Parbat Rupal face and the south face of Annapurna amongst his selection of the "50 biggest big walls" globally, that selection also includes the north ridge of Rakaposhi, the south-west face of Everest and the south face of K2 - all three were targets for Herrligkoffer's later expeditions but only the latter was successfully climbed by a team operating on those expeditions.

=== 1971 Rakaposhi expedition ===
In 1971 Herrligkoffer organized an expedition to attempt the unclimbed North Ridge of Rakaposhi (7788m). Apart from the Greenland expeditions, Rakaposhi is the only peak below the 8000m level to which Herrligkoffer led an expedition, it is nonetheless among the 30 highest peak on the planet. The attempt was unsuccessful.

=== 1972 Everest - the European Mount Everest Expedition ===
In 1972 Herrligkoffer moved east to Nepal, where the first expedition he led was an attempt on Everest by the southwest face, a line which had not been climbed at that time. The team included Don Whillans, Doug Scott, Hamish MacInnes, it was Scott's first experience of mountaineering above 7,000m. Although Felix Kuen and Adi Huber reached a height of 8550m the expedition was unsuccessful. It was 1975 when the line was successfully climbed, during the British Mount Everest Southwest Face expedition led by Chris Bonington, Scott was one of the summiteers on that occasion.

=== 1973 Rakaposhi expedition ===
The Peter Scholz Memorial Expedition of 1973 marked a return to Rakaposhi for a second attempt on the still unclimbed North Ridge. The 13-member party included only four from the 1971 group(Scholz, who was with the 1971 Rakaposhi team, had died on Mount Blanc in 1972). The attempt was again unsuccessful. This was the last time that Herrligkoffer led an expedition to Rakaposhi, the first ascent of the North Ridge was made by a Japanese party in 1979.

=== 1974 East Greenland - Watkins Mountains ===
Herrligkoffer made his second visit to east Greenland in 1974 and the target was the Watkins Range, the home of Greenland's highest peak. Little was achieved because the light aircraft they were using crash landed whilst the base camp was being established.

=== 1975 Nanga Parbat expedition - Rupal Face ===
After a five-year break from Nanga Parbat Herrligkoffer organized the Felix Kuen Memorial Expedition (Kuen had reached the summit of Nanga Parbat on Herrligkoffer's expedition in 1970 and had been climbing leader on Herrligkoffer's 1972 Everest expedition but he had taken his own life in 1974).

The expedition attempted three routes on the Rupal Face of the mountain: a line on the left/west of the face (which had been attempted on Herrligkoffer's 1968 expedition), the line followed on the successful 1970 expedition, and the unclimbed east pillar on the right-hand side of the face. The expedition had a delayed start and faced abnormally adverse weather, the maximum altitude reached was c.7550m. The left hand line was successfully climbed in 1976 by an Austrian team led by Hanns Schell and is now known as the Schell Route or the Kinshofer Route. Herrligkoffer returned to the east pillar in 1981/82.

=== 1976 East Greenland ===
Herrligkoffer's third visit to Greenland was made in 1976. He planned to return to the Watkins Range (after the abortive visit in 1974). For financial reasons that was not possible so the party went to the Stauning Alps instead but, after Herrligkoffer's expedition to the same location ten years earlier, they could only identify limited opportunities for first ascents. The only really new development was the first ascent of the north face of Mittenwalder Tinde (2620m).

=== 1977 East Greenland - Klosterbjerge ===
This was Herrligkoffer's fourth and final visit to Greenland, nine first ascents were achieved in the Klosterbjerge area of Nathorst Land.

=== 1978 Everest - German-French Expedition ===
Herrligkoffer led his second expedition to Everest in 1978, this was a combined Franco-German expedition that used the "normal" South Col route. Pierre Mazeaud led the French part of the team, with Herrligkoffer leading the German contingent. When the expedition was being planned less than 100 people had summited Everest and no French or German citizens were amongst that number.

Pierre Mazeaud, Nicolas Jaeger, Jean Afanassieff, Kurt Diemberger, Wanda Rutkiewicz, Sigi Hupfauer and Hans Engl were amongst the fifteen people who reached the summit, at that time this was a record number for one expedition. Mazeaud, Jaeger and Afanassieff were the first French nationals to do so, however the German first ascent had been achieved 6 months earlier by Reinhard Karl. Kurt Diemberger's ascent on Herrligkoffer's expedition was the fourth eight-thousander that he had climbed, his third being Makalu which he had ascended only six months earlier, at that time no climber had ascended all 14 of the 8000ers. Jaeger and Afanassieff then became the first Everest summiteers to ski down the mountain (from 8200m, below the south summit, to camp 1 at 6200m).

=== 1980 Kangchenjunga ===
Following the success of his Everest expedition Herrligkoffer turned his attention to the World's 3rd highest mountain, Kangchenjunga. German teams had made several unsuccessful attempts on the mountain in the 1930s but until 1980 only 9 people had reached the summit and the only Europeans amongst that number were from the UK

Herrligkoffer's expedition attempted the SW face, the line that 1955 British Kangchenjunga expedition took on the first ascent. Georg Ritter reached the summit with two sherpas, the first successful ascent of this route since 1955.

=== 1981 & 1982 Nanga Parbat - Rupal Face, East Pillar ===
The East Pillar, which Herrligkoffer's party attempted in 1975 had still not been climbed and the 1981 expedition set out with this as the target. Because of the prevailing conditions, the team's objective was soon changed to the Schell Route/Kinshofer Route which had also been attempted by Herrligkoffer's party in 1975 (but had since been climbed by an Austrian team). Their attempt reached c. 7450m but was ultimately unsuccessful.

In 1982 Herrligkoffer led his final expedition to Nanga Parbat, again the target was the unclimbed East Pillar, on the right-hand side of the Rupal face. On this occasion, Ueli Bühler reached the south summit (8042m) by this route, although he did not continue to the main summit (8125m) the expedition was deemed a success. The full ascent of this route, finishing at Nanga Parbat's main summit, was completed by a Polish team in 1985, it is now referred to as the South-East Buttress or South-East Spur.

=== 1986 K2 and Broad Peak: the first ascent of K2's South Face ===
Herrligkoffer was 70 in 1986 and he was again in the Karakoram, this time with a permit for the South Face of K2 and a new route on Broad Peak. This was described as "a semi-commercial undertaking" and involved climbers from Austria, Germany, Poland and Switzerland.

The South Face of K2 had not previously been ascended, initially, six of the team were involved in that attempt but that number dwindled to just two Polish mountaineers, Jerzy Kukuczka and Tadeusz Piotrowski. At that time no climber had ascended all 14 of the 8000ers but K2 would be Kukuczka's 11th. Although both of the Poles reached the summit, by what is now called the "Polish Line", Piotrowski fell and died on the descent after his crampons worked loose. 1986 was the year of the K2 Tragedy, thirteen climbers from several expeditions lost their lives on K2 in that season, Piotrowski's was the 5th of those deaths.

The other 4 climbers who started climbing with the two Poles moved to join the Broad Peak team who were attempting the 'normal route' which was taken on the first ascent in 1957, up the west spur, rather than a new route specified on the permit. Overall 9 climbers reached either the fore-summit at 8033m or the main summit of Broad Peak at 8051m. About two weeks later two of these climbers, Beda Furster and Rolf Zemp, also climbed the 'normal route' up the Abruzzi spur of K2 (against the explicit instructions of Herrligkoffer, who had been evacuated by helicopter for medical reasons).

== Legacy ==
In the early 1950s Herrligkoffer established the Deutsches Institut für Auslandforschung (German Institute of Foreign Affairs), which later became the Herrligkoffer Foundation. The organization acted as a vehicle to support and provide credibility for his arranged expeditions. Doug Scott has recounted that, a few weeks before the 1972 Everest expedition commenced "I delivered all the equipment gathered in the UK to the Deutsches Institut für Auslandforschung which is the rather grandiose title of Herrligkoffer's expedition organizing enterprise. The Institut turned out to be his doctor's surgery". From its initiation, until 1986, Herrligkoffer led all but two of the expeditions conducted under the foundation's auspices; he remained its chairman until he died in 1991, Reinhold Messner has subsequently been amongst his successors in that role.

When Herrligkoffer was trying to arrange his first expedition in 1953 there was a view, described by Paul Bauer (the leader of two German expeditions to Kangchenjunga and the principal voice of the German Himalaya Foundation) that Herrligkoffer was "a man unknown in mountaineering circles and without experience of the subject". When Herrligkoffer approached the Bavarian government and the German Alpine Club for financial support for the 1953 expedition he was turned down and after the expedition had concluded he complained of a press campaign against him in which it was asserted that he was not fit to be a leader.

This negative image was one of the problems that Herrligkoffer faced when he unsuccessfully attempted to mount expeditions to Antarctica both in 1957/58, linked to the International Geophysical Year, and also in 1962/63 to the Mühlig-Hofmann Mountains. In addition, the German IGY Commission and the "Deutsche Forschungsgemeinschaft" (German Science Foundation) took the view that Herrligkoffer "did not have the scientific expertise to lead a scientific expedition to Antarctica".

Herrligkoffer's leadership style was controversial. The German mountaineering magazine, Alpinismus, published a letter from Hans Saler (a member of the 1970 Nanga Parbat expedition) criticizing Herrligkoffer's ability as a leader, but a court injunction served on Alpinismus prevented most of the copies being sold. In the same year, the Austrian mountaineer Peter Baumgartner leveled several accusations against Herrligkoffer, including that of 'leading from behind', and of criticizing his team after the 1968 Nanga Parbat expedition.

Several times, after successes on the mountain, there were disputes between the expedition leader and individual participants which tarnished the magnificent achievements achieved, the most striking being the bitter dispute with Reinhold Messner after the Nanga-Parbat-Expedition in 1970, and with Hermann Buhl after the 1953 expedition.

In the run-up to each expedition, Herrligkoffer required all participants to sign a contract, and among the conditions was the requirement that all publicity, publication and photographic rights were assigned to the Deutsches Institut für Auslandforschung - which was established and controlled by Herrligkoffer. Having signed over all rights, none of the expedition participants were able to publish a personal perspective of their experiences during the expeditions. Those who ignored this, notably Hermann Buhl and Reinhold Messner, were involved in lengthy court proceedings that Herrligkoffer won.

Chris Bonington has written that Herrligkoffer "had a profound influence on Himalayan adventure". It was Herrligkoffer's skill in raising funds from sponsors which provided the opportunity for the participation of most of the mountaineers involved in these expeditions and Kurt Diemberger commented that the expeditions organized by Herrligkoffer have "given many mountaineers their first chance to go to the Himalayas", Reinhold Messner, Doug Scott and Hermann Buhl being three of the more notable cases.

== Selected Publications and Filmography ==
- Nanga Parbat 1953. Lehmann, München 1954.
- Deutsche am Broad Peak 8047 m. Durch Pakistan zur Wunderwelt des Himalaya. Lehmann, München 1955.
- Nanga Parbat. Ullstein, Berlin 1967.
- Sieg am Kanchenjunga. Die deutsche Erstbesteigung. Droemer Knaur, München 1983, ISBN 3-426-03716-5.
- Mein Weg in den Himalaya. Pietsch, Stuttgart, 1989.
- Abschied vom Himalaya. Erfolg und Tragik am K2 und Broad Peak. Bayerland, Dachau 1989, ISBN 3-89251-029-6.

Hans Ertl joined the 1953 Nanga Parbat expedition to film the documentary Nanga Parbat which recounts the first ascent of that mountain by Hermann Buhl.

Herrligkoffer directed the film Deutsche Diamir Expedition which documented the successful expedition to the Diamir face of Nanga Parbat in 1962.

Two significant posthumous productions focusing on Herrligkoffer are:

- Joseph Vilsmaier's film Nanga Parbat which was made as a collaboration between Vilsmaier and Messner. The depiction of the Herrligkoffer's personality in this 2010 production led Herrligkoffer's son, Klaus, to publicly demand an apology from the production company.
- The 2016 film Karl Maria Herrligkoffer - Visionär und Wegbegleiter which marked the hundredth anniversary of Herrligkoffer's birth, incorporates extracts from filming on his expeditions and interviews with both his son and a number of the expedition members, including Reinhold Messner.
