= Love Ranch =

2010 film by Taylor Hackford

- Theatrical release poster
- Directed by: Taylor Hackford
- Written by: Mark Jacobson
- Produced by: David Bergstein; Lou DiBella; Taylor Hackford
- Starring: Helen Mirren; Joe Pesci
- Cinematography: Kieran McGuigan
- Edited by: Paul Hirsch
- Music by: Chris P. Bacon
- Distributed by: Capitol Films; Road Rebel
- Release date: June 30, 2010
- Running time: 117 minutes
- Country: United States
- Language: English
- Budget: $25 million
- Box office: $137,885

Love Ranch is a 2010 American drama film directed by Taylor Hackford and starring Helen Mirren, Joe Pesci, Sergio Peris-Mencheta, Gina Gershon and Bryan Cranston. It was written by Mark Jacobson.

The film is based on the lives of Joe Conforte and Sally Conforte, a married couple who operated the first legal brothel in the United States after the widespread criminalization of prostitution in the U.S. earlier in the 20th century, the Mustang Ranch in Storey County, Nevada, Violence results when their marriage is tested by infidelity. The story also alludes to the mysterious circumstances surrounding the assassination of famous Argentinian boxer Ringo Bonavena in the Mustang Ranch.

== Plot ==
Charlie "Goodtimes" Bontempo and his wife, Grace, run a legal brothel known as the Love Ranch on a large, remote property near Reno, Nevada. Grace's mother had been a prostitute, so Grace knew the business, but it was Charlie who persuaded her to open a brothel in a part of Nevada where doing so would not violate the law. The business runs smoothly but is not without its headaches, such as unruly customers needing to be dealt with by a bouncer or prostitutes who get out of line. Grace is amazed when Charlie procures the contract of a professional heavyweight boxer, Armando "Bruza" Bonavena, who is from Argentina and has had fights against the likes of Muhammad Ali and Joe Frazier.

Charlie is eager to have a fighter but coaxes Grace into becoming Bruza's actual manager because Charlie has a felony conviction that prevents him from getting a license. Grace can hardly believe Bruza is willing to live and train at the brothel, where he moves into a trailer. She is surprised even more when Bruza begins to demonstrate a physical interest in her since she is married and considerably older. She is offended at first, but the boxer's attention and outgoing personality begin to win her over. Bruza begins to voice an interest in becoming Grace's business partner in running the brothel. Charlie becomes aware of what's happening behind his back, leading to a disastrous outcome for all.

== Cast ==
- Helen Mirren as Grace Bontempo
- Joe Pesci as Charlie "Charlie Goodtimes" Bontempo
- Sergio Peris-Mencheta as Armando Bruza
- Bryan Cranston as James Pettis
- Gina Gershon as Irene
- Scout Taylor-Compton as Christina
- Taryn Manning as Mallory
- Gil Birmingham as Sheriff Cortez
- Bai Ling as Samantha
- Rick Gomez as Tom Macy
- Leslie Jordan as Mr. Hainsworth
- M. C. Gainey as Warren Stamp
- Elise Neal as Alana
- Harve Presnell as Dr. Smathers (in his final film role)
- Wendell Pierce as Naasih Mohammed

== Production and release ==
Filming began in Reno, Nevada, in January 2008.

Love Ranch was released in limited U.S. theaters on June 30, 2010. It was Harve Presnell's final film role.

== Reception ==
The film has received mostly negative reviews. On review aggregator website Rotten Tomatoes, the film holds an approval rating of 12% based on 50 reviews, and an average rating of 3.7/10. The website's critical consensus reads, "Despite its saucy setup and the always marvelous Helen Mirren, Love Ranch is disappointingly flaccid." On Metacritic, the film has a weighted average score of 37 out of 100, based on 23 critics, indicating "generally unfavorable" reviews.

== See also ==
- Oscar Bonavena – murdered real-life model for boxer Armando Bruza
