= Sally Conforte =

American brothel owner and boxing manager (1917–1992)

- Born: Jessica Elzora Burgess; January 17, 1917; Palos, Alabama, U.S.
- Died: 9 September 1992 (aged 75)
- Citizenship: United States
- Occupations: Brothel owner, boxing manager
- Movement: Legal prostitution
- Spouse: Joseph Conforte

Jessica Elzora Burgess (January 17, 1917 – September 9, 1992), better known as Sally Conforte, was the first legal brothel owner and the second female boxing manager in U.S. history. She is known as the matriarch of legal prostitution. She is infamous for her role in the murder of boxer Oscar Bonavena from Argentina and for swindling the IRS. She was married to Mustang Ranch owner Joe Conforte.

== Life ==
Sally was born in Palos, Alabama in January 1917, and had eleven siblings.

=== First marriage and first brothels ===
Sally married Barney Perlman in 1942 in Ft. Lauderdale, Florida. She divorced him in Reno, Nevada in 1951, after he ran off with a showgirl from the Riverside Hotel. Sally resumed use of her maiden name, Burgess. After the end of her relationship with Perlman, she opened the Sally J Ranch brothel in Fallon, Nevada, east of Reno near the Naval Air Station Fallon but it was closed by the sheriff. By 1955, Sally had operated four brothels in Fallon, each one closed by the sheriff.

=== Second marriage and further prostitution-related activities ===
She met her second husband, Joseph Conforte, in 1955; they were married in August 1961. According to a July 26, 1976 article in New York Magazine: "That first year (1955), on Thanksgiving Eve, Joe met Sally. He had opened a house near the town of Wadsworth, 30 miles east of Reno, and he'd driven in to pick up a girl to work the holiday. There in the girl's apartment was Sally Burgess--exactly the madam he'd been looking for."

In 1958, Joe and Sally were arrested for running a prostitution call center across from a church in downtown Reno. According to the Reno Evening Gazette: "Reno Police Chief T.R. Berrum called it 'the most brazen and flagrant' prostitution operation he has seen." Joe and Sally opened several brothels together, creating a prostitution empire that stretched across Nevada and to South Lake Tahoe.

According to Gabriel Vogliotti, Conforte and her husband Joe had a strained relationship. At times, Joe was supportive and capable and at other times he had a "crushing ego". Sally was "unhappy, cheated, [and] at home" in the later part of their relationship, and she felt "so lonely".

Joseph Conforte entered prison on January 10, 1962. Sally had begun to operate out of Stateline in Douglas County, Nevada next to South Lake Tahoe. Douglas County had no ordinance to prohibit prostitution, and Sally's business flourished. Quoting Mrs. John McMillan, manager of a 185-unit apartment house at Stateline, to the Douglas County Commission, February 1966: "It's one of the biggest businesses I've ever seen in my life."

Sally was arrested for operating a South Lake Tahoe beauty shop illegally in an apartment building, and her escort business closed.

Joseph Conforte returned to Northern Nevada in December 1965. With her husband's support and several thugs they hired, Sally waged a mini war on her competitors. From the Nevada State Journal, February 1, 1966, page 1: "A report of gunfire in the Happy Valley area... Washoe Sheriffs arrived just in time... Pursuit of the car was taken up and continued well into the Reno area... In the automobile, officers said, was Sally Conforte, former operator of a house of prostitution in the Happy Valley area. With her were three men, described by sheriff's officers as 'well-known hoods.' Also in the car, officers said, was an 'arsenal', a .38 caliber pistol, a .30 caliber carbine, a shotgun, and a plentiful amount of ammunition."

Additional news reports named George Bart Piscitelle, aka George Perry, as one of the hoods in the car with Sally. Piscitelle was an enforcer for Los Angeles mobster Mickey Cohen, who later died in a gun battle in Los Angeles.

1967, the Confortes took control of the Mustang Bridge Ranch brothel, located a mere ten minute drive from downtown Reno. Joe put the cathouse business in Sally's name so he could not be further accused of being a pimp and to keep it out of IRS reach, having been convicted of tax evasion before.

=== First legal brothel owner ===
February 26, 1971, Nevada's Governor Mike O'Callaghan signed anti-vice bill SB214, also known as the county option brothel bill, into law, giving counties the ability to license and regulate brothels while outlawing Clark County-Las Vegas to keep the Confortes out. Mustang Bridge Ranch, with Sally Conforte as licensee, was first in the nation to be licensed under the new state law.

=== Boxing and the death of Oscar Bonavena ===
In March 1976, Oscar Bonavena (Argentina), seventh-ranked heavyweight boxer, signed Sally as his manager, making her the second female boxing manager in United States history. Oscar Bonavena also was her lover, who conspired with her to kill Joseph Conforte themselves or hire someone to do it.

On May 15, 1976, Joe and Sally Conforte's Mustang Ranch brothel held its grand opening. A week after the Mustang Ranch officially opened, Oscar Bonavena was shot and killed at the front gate by Joe Conforte's enforcer, Willard Ross Brymer. The Confortes became the source of hatred for many in Argentina as a result.

The Bonavena family sued the Confortes, seeking monetary restitution. After the death of Oscar Bonavena, Farrell wrote that (1976): "[Sally] was a great white shark of suffering... scorned and robbed, a witness to things she hardly dared consider. She blamed herself, she blamed her husband, she felt slammed back into the grave of eleven years. And in her moments of breakdown, when she trembled even to the touch, she went through an agony that overwhelmed. It was a dangerous agony, one that didn't care what happened anymore."

== Financial Issues ==
=== Tax evasion ===
In 1977, Sally and Joe were convicted of tax evasion and fraud; fraud added for regularly destroying their financial records. Sally was defended by attorneys Harry E. Claiborne and Oscar Goodman.

Sally was given a fine and probation. Joe, however, was sentenced to twenty years in prison. The IRS imposed heavy fines and placed liens on Joe and Sally's assets. Conforte fled the United States to Brazil in December 1980 to avoid prison for tax evasion and also prosecution for attempting to bribe the Lyon County, Nevada district attorney.

Sally renewed her boxing program, signing managerial contracts with heavyweight Bernardo Mercado, middleweight Vinnie Curto, and Jihad Karriem and John Vasquez, two promising young middleweights.

=== Bankruptcy ===
1982, while in Brazil, Joe deeded his assets to Sally and she filed for bankruptcy in Reno.

In December 1984, Joe was released from federal prison, having served no jail time for the attempted bribery charge. The IRS drastically reduced the tens of millions of dollars of taxes Joe and Sally Conforte owed to $7.3 million. Joe and Sally created a public offering of Mustang Ranch stock that could have satisfied the remainder of their debt to the IRS, but three attempts at the IPO failed.

=== Forfeiture and IRS swindle ===
In 1990, her health in decline, Sally deeded her assets to Joe and he prepared to file his own bankruptcy when federal prosecutors obtained emergency forfeiture in court while armed U.S. Treasury Department agents seized the Mustang Ranch and other property.

Using a proxy, Joe and Sally secretly bought the Mustang Ranch back from the government at pennies on the dollar of what they owed. Joe's brothel license with Storey County had been maintained throughout all this. The shell company that took control of Mustang Ranch hired Joe to run the place. The swindling of the IRS was complete when the Mustang Ranch was sold to another company that was later found to be a subsidiary of the offshore A.G.E. Corporation of which Joe was the main shareholder. Joe retired to Rio de Janeiro in 1991.

== Death ==
Sally Conforte died in 1992. Her cremated remains are entombed at Our Lady of Sorrows in Reno, Nevada. After her death, Barry Farrell wrote in the New York magazine (1976): "She was tough, loyal, and loving and sometimes mean as a snake, and when she got around to telling stories of when she was 'with the boys,' no one was inclined to doubt her. Sally could swear like a real lady and rattle windows with her laugh...."

== In popular culture ==
Appearance in 1975 documentary movie Mustang: The House That Joe Built

Monica Lewis played a madam in the likeness of Sally Conforte in the movie Charley Varrick (1975).

Sally Conforte appeared as herself in the 1978 action film Death Dimension.

Helen Mirren played Sally Conforte in the movie Love Ranch (2010).

== See also ==
- Jackie Kallen
- Aileen Eaton
