= Billy Joiner =

American boxer (1938–2019)

Billy Joiner (10 May 1938 – June 2019), was an American professional boxer from Cincinnati, U.S.

== Early life ==
Joiner was born in Cincinnati, Ohio, on 10 May 1938. His father was a professional boxer, as was his uncle who once knocked out Freddie Miller in a bout.

== Amateur career ==
Joiner was the 1962 National Golden Gloves and National AAU Light-Heavyweight Champion and compiled an Amateur record of 86–6 (The Ring, March 1964). He won the National Golden Gloves with a win over Gerald McClure of Toledo, Ohio. He fought Cassius Clay twice as an amateur between 1960 and 1961. He made his professional debut in August 1962, stopping Jukius Dickins in two rounds.

== Professional career ==
A promising heavyweight prospect in the 1960s, Joiner is largely regarded as having failed to reach true notoriety. Joiner is best remembered for his fight with former world heavyweight champion Sonny Liston on March 28, 1969. This was their second fight. They had fought in May the year before with Liston winning a seventh-round TKO.

He also fought and lost to top heavyweight contenders Zora Folley, Oscar Bonavena, Mac Foster, Alfredo Evangelista and Larry Holmes.

== Later life ==
After retiring from the ring, Joiner for the Ohio State Highway Maintenance Department for thirty years, ending his career as a Superintendent. He was also employed as an amateur boxing coach.

== Death ==
Joiner died at the age of 81 in June 2019.

== Professional boxing record ==
12 Wins (5 knockouts, 7 decisions), 13 Losses (5 knockouts, 8 decisions), 3 Draws
| Result | Record | Opponent | Type | Round | Date | Location | Notes |
| Win | 12-13-3 | (United States) Young Louis | PTS | 10 | 13/11/1981 | (United States) Northwest Activities Center, Detroit, Michigan, U.S. | |
| Loss | 11-13-3 | (Uruguay) Alfredo Evangelista | KO | 1 | 27/05/1978 | León, Spain | |
| Win | 11-12-3 | (United States) "King" Jim Fletcher | TKO | 5 | 19/08/1976 | (United States) Washoe Fairgrounds Pavilion, Reno, Nevada, U.S. | |
| Loss | 10-12-3 | (Argentina) Oscar Bonavena | UD | 10 | 26/02/1976 | (United States) Reno, Nevada, U.S. | |
| Loss | 10-11-3 | (United States) Larry Holmes | TKO | 3 | 20/12/1975 | Roberto Clemente Coliseum, San Juan, Puerto Rico | Referee stopped the bout at 2:29 of the third round. |
| Loss | 10-10-3 | (Germany) Bernd August | PTS | 8 | 28/09/1973 | Berlin, Germany | |
| Loss | 10-9-3 | (United States) Mac Foster | KO | 5 | 29/07/1971 | (United States) Olympic Auditorium, Los Angeles, California, U.S. | Joiner knocked out at 2:55 of the fifth round. |
| Loss | 10-8-3 | (Germany) Juergen Blin | PTS | 10 | 09/10/1970 | Hamburg, Germany | |
| Loss | 10-7-3 | (United States) Alvin Lewis | UD | 10 | 15/07/1970 | (United States) Madison Square Garden, New York City, New York, U.S. | |
| Loss | 10-6-3 | (United States) Zora Folley | UD | 10 | 05/11/1969 | (United States) Silver Slipper, Paradise, Nevada, U.S. | |
| Win | 10-5-3 | (Canada) Bob Cleroux | SD | 10 | 31/07/1969 | Paul Sauve Arena, Montreal, Quebec, Canada | |
| Loss | 9-5-3 | (United States) Sonny Liston | UD | 10 | 28/03/1969 | (United States) Kiel Auditorium, Saint Louis, Missouri, U.S. | |
| Loss | 9-4-3 | (United States) Sonny Liston | RTD | 7 | 23/05/1968 | (United States) Olympic Auditorium, Los Angeles, California, U.S. | |
| Draw | 9-3-3 | (United States) Chuck Leslie | PTS | 10 | 27/03/1968 | (United States) Silver Slipper, Paradise, Nevada, U.S. | |
| Draw | 9-3-2 | (Italy) Dante Cane | PTS | 10 | 12/02/1968 | Bologna, Italy | |
| Draw | 9-3-1 | (Italy) Piero Tomasoni | PTS | 10 | 26/12/1967 | Brescia, Italy | |
| Loss | 9-3 | (United States) "King" Jim Fletcher | PTS | 10 | 04/12/1967 | (United States) Silver Slipper, Paradise, Nevada, U.S. | |
| Loss | 9-2 | (United States) Hubert Hilton | TKO | 9 | 08/09/1966 | (United States) Freeport Stadium, Freeport, New York | |
| Win | 9-1 | (United States) Mert Brownfield | KO | 2 | 13/06/1966 | (United States) Cincinnati, Ohio, U.S. | |
| Win | 8-1 | (United States) Lee Wallace Carr | UD | 10 | 13/11/1964 | (United States) Madison Square Garden, New York City, New York, U.S. | |
| Loss | 7-1 | (United States) Amos Johnson | SD | 10 | 11/09/1964 | (United States) Cleveland Arena, Cleveland, Ohio, U.S. | Ohio Heavyweight Title. |
| Win | 7-0 | (United States) Oron Johnson | TKO | 8 | 22/05/1964 | (United States) Cleveland Arena, Cleveland, Ohio, U.S. | Referee stopped the bout at 2:50 of the eighth round. |
| Win | 6-0 | (United States) Harvey C. Jones | UD | 8 | 17/04/1964 | (United States) Cleveland Arena, Cleveland, Ohio, U.S. | |
| Win | 5-0 | (United States) Lloyd Washington | UD | 10 | 11/03/1964 | (United States) Painesville Armory, Painesville, Ohio, U.S. | |
| Win | 4-0 | (United States) Lou Bailey | PTS | 10 | 17/01/1964 | (United States) Cleveland Arena, Cleveland, Ohio, U.S. | |
| Win | 3-0 | (United States) Amos Johnson | PTS | 10 | 19/11/1963 | (United States) Akron, Ohio, U.S. | |
| Win | 2-0 | (United States) Marion Connor | TKO | 5 | 06/02/1963 | (United States) Canton Auditorium, Canton, Ohio, U.S. | Referee stopped the bout at 2:05 of the fifth round. |
| Win | 1-0 | (United States) Julius Dickens | KO | 2 | 25/08/1962 | (United States) Madison Square Garden, New York City, New York, U.S. | Dickens knocked out at 1:24 of the second round. |
