= Cathal O'Shannon (TV presenter) =

Irish journalist and television personality

- Born: 23 August 1928; Dublin, Ireland
- Died: 22 October 2011 (aged 83); Dublin, Ireland
- Occupations: Journalist and TV presenter

Cathal O'Shannon (23 August 1928 – 22 October 2011) was an Irish journalist and television presenter. He was a reporter with The Irish Times, and television reporter/presenter and documentary film maker with RTÉ.

He was awarded lifetime membership of the Irish Film & Television Academy in 2010, to which he said it was "particularly gratifying that it occurs before I pop my clogs".

The Irish radio and television broadcaster Terry Wogan described O'Shannon as possibly the greatest Irish television journalist of the 20th century.

== Early life ==
O'Shannon was born in Marino, Dublin, Ireland, on 23 August 1928, the son of Cathal O'Shannon (Sr.), a Socialist and Irish Republican. He received his formal education at Colaiste Mhuire School, in Parnell Square, Dublin. Despite his father's politics, as a 16-year-old O'Shannon volunteered for war time service with the Royal Air Force in Belfast in 1945 during World War II, utilizing a forged birth certificate to disguise being underage for enlistment with the British Armed Forces. After air crew training he was posted to the Far East, as a rear gunner in an Avro Lancaster bomber to take part in the Burma Campaign, but the war ended with the downfall of the Japanese Empire before he was required to fly combat sorties.

== Career ==
O'Shannon first became a journalist with The Irish Times on leaving the R.A.F. in 1947. Later he joined the Irish state broadcasting service Raidió Teilifís Éireann (RTÉ).

In July 1972 he recorded a notable television interview with 31-year-old Muhammad Ali, when Ali was in Dublin to compete at Croke Park in a bout with Alvin Lewis.

He received a Jacob's Award for his 1976 TV documentary, Even the Olives are Bleeding, which detailed with the activities of the "Connolly Column" in the Spanish Civil War. Two years later he was honoured with a second Jacob's Award for his television biography 'Emmet Dalton Remembers' (1978).

In 1978, he left RTÉ to join Canadian company Alcan which was setting up an aluminium plant at Aughinish, County Limerick in 1978. He was head-hunted to become its Director of Public Affairs, an important post at a time when there were environmental concerns about the effects of aluminium production. He admitted that he was attracted by the salary, "five times what RTÉ were paying me", but he also later said that one of the reason for the move was that he had become unhappy with working at RTÉ, stating in an interview that: "The real reason I got out of RTÉ was that they wouldn’t let me do what I wanted to do journalistically". He had submitted proposals to the station's editors for television documentary series on the Civil War, and also one on the wartime Emergency period, but they had been rejected. While he enjoyed the social life with lavish expenses which his public relations duties involved, his friends believed that he missed the varied life and travel of journalism. He retired early from Aughinish in 1992, and returned to making television documentaries with RTÉ.

In January 2007, his last documentary, Hidden History: Ireland's Nazis, was broadcast by RTÉ as a two-part series. It explored how a number of former Nazis and Nazi collaborators from Occupied Europe went to live in Republic of Ireland after the Second World War— the best known of whom was Otto Skorzeny, who lived for a period in County Kildare. Others included such Breton nationalists as Alan Heusaff, Yann Fouéré and Yann Goulet, as well as two Belgians, Albert Folens and Albert Luykx.

On 12 January 2007 he announced his retirement at the age of 80.

== Death ==
After weakening health for two years, and spending his last days in a hospice at Blackrock, O'Shannon died at the Beacon Hospital in Dublin on 22 October 2011 in his 84th year. His body was reposed at Fanagans Funeral Home in Dublin on 25 October 2011, followed by a funeral on 26 October 2011 at Glasnevin Cemetery Chapel, where it was afterwards cremated.

== Personal life ==
His wife, Patsy, whom he met while they were working for The Irish Times office in London, died in 2006. They had been married for more than 50 years.

In a 2008 television documentary O'Shannon admitted that throughout his marriage he had been a serial womaniser, who had repeatedly engaged in extra-marital affairs unbeknownst to his wife.

== Tributes ==
Director-General of RTÉ Noel Curran said O'Shannon had brought into being "some of the great moments in the RTÉ documentary and factual schedule over the past five decades." In tribute, RTÉ One showed the documentary Cathal O'Shannon: Telling Tales on 10 November 2011. It had originally aired in 2008 to mark his 80th birthday.
