= Nanga Parbat (film) =

- Film poster
- Directed by: Joseph Vilsmaier
- Written by: Reinhard Klooss; Sven Severin
- Produced by: Jörg A.L. Schallehn; Joseph Vilsmaier
- Starring: Florian Stetter; Markus Krojer; Lorenzo Walcher; Andreas Tobias; Karl Markovics
- Cinematography: Helmfried Kober
- Edited by: Sandy Saffeels; Uli Schön; Max Zandanel
- Music by: Gustavo Santaolalla
- Production companies: Senator Film Verleih (presents); Perathon Film; Nanga Parbat Filmproduktion (on behalf of)
- Release date: 14 January 2010 (Germany)
- Running time: 104 minutes
- Country: Germany
- Language: German
- Budget: €7,000,000 (estimated)

Nanga Parbat is a 2010 German biographical drama film based on the tragic 1970 mountaineering expedition of Messner brothers to one of the tallest mountains in the world, Nanga Parbat.

== Plot ==
The movie begins with the flashback showing two brothers Reinhold and Günther Messner climbing a mountain. They reach the summit after a risky climb endangering the life of Günther. Then the movie comes to the present scenario where Karl Herrligkoffer, who led the 1970 expedition, presents the facts of the expedition to ascend the Nanga Parbat, a Himalayan peak located in Gilgit-Baltistan region in northern Pakistan. At the same time, Reinhold enters the press hall, where he is struck with surprise when Karl Herrligkoffer blames Reinhold for the loss of his brother Günther while descending. The media reporters rush towards Reinhold to know about the actual incident that took place on Nanga Parbat.

Reinhold starts the story from their childhood events when they were in South Tyrol (Italy). The story flashes back to the town of St. Peter in Villnöss where the two brothers are climbing the wall of their school located in the church. While they are climbing the wall, they are caught by the Priest of the church. The Messner brothers enter the class where the teacher is their own father, and they are scolded by their father for risking their lives while climbing. On an occasion in the church, both brothers run to the church rooftop where they can see a breathtaking view of the mountain in their town. From here, they aim to ascend the summit of the Nanga Parbat. The story then advances to their young life where they are studying in a school. Reinhold goes to a hospital to meet Karl Herrligkoffer, who had been leading the earlier expeditions to the Nanga Parbat. There, they both agree to take a German expedition to ascend the summit of Nanga Parbat.

They begin their expedition to Nanga Parbat, leaving for Pakistan where they first reach Rawalpindi, a city in the north of Pakistan. There, they have to convince the German Councilor for issuance of further fundings from the German government. They then begin their journey, first approaching their base camp, Rupal Flank, in Gilgit Baltistan province. Four men, including Reinhold and Günther, make their way on the mission. While they are climbing, they encounter cold weather, which harms them to a great extent. On their way to ascend, they are signaled by base camp for poor weather at the altitude of the peak. Reinhold decides not to change his mind and to follow the pursuit of his mission, thus convincing his brother and other team members to return to base camp, indeed saving their lives. Günther decides not to leave and to stay with his brother and to complete the mission. Both brothers succeed in ascending the summit of the mountain, where they plant their flag, in-spite of cold and heavy snowy weather at the summit. They decide to descend from the peak as soon as possible, as Günther is injured and is suffering, due to harsh weather and lack of food. On their way back, an avalanche occurs, killing Günther. Reinhold being dejected, makes his way down through the shorter way, which leads to the Diamir face of the peak, instead of taking way back to his base camp at Rupal flank. Meanwhile, the other two members reach their base camp claiming the death of Messner brothers. Their camp decides to return to Germany. Reinhold reaches the Diamir valley where he is rescued by the locals. From there, he walks to the Rupal Flank towards his base camp with his foot affected by frostbite. There, he is rescued by a Pakistan army officer, who takes him along with him and, on their way, they meet their team. The movie than shows Reinhold in a hospital in Innsbruck (Austria), and the movie ends with a scene showing the people gathering in a church, paying condolence to Reinhold and his parents for the death of Günther.

Before the end credits begin to roll, viewers are informed that Günther’s body was discovered in 2005, offering further proof of Reinhold’s long-disputed story of the events.

== Cast ==
- Florian Stetter as Reinhold Messner
- Andreas Tobias as Günther Messner
- Karl Markovics as Karl Maria Herrligkoffer
- Jule Ronstedt as Alice von Hobe
- Volker Bruch as Gerd Bauer
- Steffen Schroeder as Felix Kuen
- Sebastian Bezzel as Peter Scholz
- Michael Kranz as Hans Saler
- Markus Krojer as young Reinhold Messner
- Lorenzo Walcher as young Günther Messner

== Reception ==
Nanga Parbat received mixed reviews from critics. Derek Elley of Variety commented, "Jaw-dropping widescreen lensing is not matched by jaw-dropping human drama".

Don Groves of SBS wrote that "Mountain climbing saga fails to reach its peak".

== See also ==
- The Naked Mountain, Reinhold Messner's 2002 memoir about the events
- North Face
- Seven Years in Tibet
- K2 (film)
