= Alvin Lewis (boxer) =

American boxer (1942–2018)

Al Lewis
Personal information
- Nickname: Blue
- Born: Alvin Lewis; November 12, 1942 Detroit, Michigan, U.S.
- Died: January 31, 2018 (aged 75) Flint, Michigan, U.S.
- Height: 6 ft 3 in (191 cm)
- Weight: heavyweight

Boxing career
- Stance: orthodox

Boxing record
- Total fights: 36
- Wins: 30
- Win by KO: 19
- Losses: 6

Alvin Lewis, also known as Al Lewis, (November 12, 1942 – January 31, 2018) was an American professional boxer who fought in the heavyweight division under the alias "Al "Blue" Lewis". A powerful adversary to many, "Blue" Lewis beat: Cleveland Williams, Billy Joiner, Bill McMurray, Eduardo Corletti, and Bob Stallings.

Lewis was a long-term sparring partner of Muhammad Ali and is mentioned in Ali's autobiography. He also sparred with, among others, George Foreman before the champion's match with Ken Norton.

== Professional career ==
Lewis was born in Detroit and, after a troubled youth background, turned professional in June 1966 in Canton, Ohio. In his debut Lewis faced "Clown Prince" Art Miller. Lewis won this fight with a 1st round knockout.

One fight was struck from his record when the Licensing Authority in Illinois determined that the opponent was not licensed to fight in Illinois and had been a last minute substitution.

== Other matches ==
He accrued 15 wins from his debut. In his sixteenth bout, Bob Stallings stopped him in seven in 1967. Lewis won their rematch a year later by a 2nd round knock out. Lewis also fought Leotis Martin twice a while later, losing the first by KO in 9 and the direct rematch by decision. Lewis outpointed fringe contender Dick Wipperman in 1967.

He fought an ageing Cleveland Williams whom he stopped in four in 1970, Oscar Bonavena against whom he lost by disqualification after decking Oscar several times in 1971 and Jack O'Halloran, against whom he lost on points in 1973.

== The Ali fight ==
He is best remembered for a non-title fight with Muhammad Ali, which took place at Croke Park in Dublin, Ireland on July 19, 1972. Outclassed, Lewis was down in the 5th. While it looked like it would end then and there, he then surprised many by rallying forward and launching unexpected counter offensives, typically after an Ali burst. It wasn't enough however, and he was ultimately stopped in the 11th round. The Lewis-Ali event is described in the documentary film, When Ali Came to Ireland.

== Retirement ==
He last fought in November 1973. His retirement was sudden and unexpected. A Ring Magazine article said he had been helping a priest with a broken-down car when the battery sparked, spitting acid from the engine-bay into one of his eyes. This injury caused his boxing license to be revoked.

Lewis's final record was 30W(19Ko's)-6L-0D.

== Death ==
Lewis died in Flint, Michigan, on 21 January 2018, at the age of 75. His cause of death was not publicized.

== Professional boxing record ==
31 Wins (20 knockouts, 11 decisions), 5 Losses (2 knockouts, 2 decisions, 1 DQ)
Result	Record	Opponent	Type	Round	Date	Location	Notes
Win	4-15	(United States) JD McCauley	KO	2	November 14, 1973	(United States) Dayton, Ohio	
Win	18-5	(United States) Jimmy Cross	KO	6	September 4, 1973	(United States) Oklahoma City	
Win	29-2	(United States) Humphrey McBride	TKO	3	July 19, 1973	(Canada) Halifax, Nova Scotia	Referee stopped the bout at 1:45 of the third round.
Loss	29-15-2	(United States) Jack O'Halloran	PTS	10	March 1, 1973	(United States) Detroit, Michigan	
Win	7-7-1	(United States) Charlie Reno	PTS	10	January 22, 1973	(United States) Detroit Olympia, Detroit, Michigan	
Loss	37-1	(United States) Muhammad Ali	TKO	11	July 19, 1972	(Republic of Ireland) Croke Park, Dublin	Referee stopped the bout at 1:15 of the 11th round.
Loss	46-7-1	(Argentina) Oscar Bonavena	DQ	7	October 4, 1971	(Argentina) Estadio Luna Park, Buenos Aires	
Win	7-3-2	(United States) Bob Mashburn	TKO	5	May 7, 1971	(United States) Michigan State Fair, Detroit, Michigan	
Win	74-10-1	(United States) Cleveland Williams	TKO	4	October 21, 1970	(United States) Cobo Arena, Detroit, Michigan	
Win	10-6-3	(United States) Billy Joiner	UD	10	July 15, 1970	(United States) Madison Square Garden, New York City	
Win	4-5-2	(Jamaica) Edmund Stewart	TKO	7	June 29, 1970	(United States) Detroit, Michigan	
Win	8-4-1	(United States) Charles Williams	TKO	6	February 27, 1970	(United States) Michigan State Fair, Detroit, Michigan	
Win	25-21-2	(United States) Bill McMurray	PTS	10	November 19, 1969	(United States) Cleveland Arena, Cleveland, Ohio	
Win	10-4-1	(United States) Willie McMillan	PTS	10	April 14, 1969	(United States) Palisades Rink, McKeesport, Pennsylvania	
Loss	27-5	(United States) Leotis Martin	SD	10	February 26, 1969	(United States) Detroit Olympia, Detroit, Michigan	
Loss	26-5	(United States) Leotis Martin	TKO	9	November 26, 1968	(United States) Detroit, Michigan	Referee stopped the bout at 1:33 of the ninth round.
Win	13-17	(United States) Bob Stallings	TKO	2	September 21, 1968	(United States) Detroit, Michigan	
Win	25-2-5	(Argentina) Eduardo Corletti	KO	2	July 24, 1968	(United States) Detroit Olympia, Detroit, Michigan	
Win	27-10-1	(United States) Johnny Featherman	KO	2	May 29, 1968	(United States) Indiana State Fairgrounds Coliseum, Indianapolis, Indiana	
Win	13-15	(United States) Bob Stallings	UD	10	May 8, 1968	(United States) Palisades Rink, McKeesport, Pennsylvania	
Win	8-17-3	(United States) Dave Russell	TKO	7	April 3, 1968	(United States) Palisades Rink, McKeesport, Pennsylvania	
Win	12-11	(United States) Bob Stallings	TKO	7	December 12, 1967	(United States) Buffalo Memorial Auditorium, Buffalo, New York	
Win	32-10-1	(United States) Dick Wipperman	UD	10	October 17, 1967	(United States) Buffalo Memorial Auditorium, Buffalo, New York	
Win	11-6-1	(United States) Toro Smith	KO	3	September 25, 1967	(United States) Cobo Arena, Detroit, Michigan	
Win	9-1	(United States) Willie McMillan	PTS	8	August 24, 1967	(United States) Detroit, Michigan	
Win	11-1-1	(United States) Aaron Eastling	KO	5	June 5, 1967	(United States) Milwaukee Auditorium, Milwaukee, Wisconsin	Eastling knocked out at 1:16 of the fifth round.
Win	4-3	(United States) Earl Averette	PTS	6	May 12, 1967	(United States) Detroit, Michigan	
Win	5-6	(United States) Buddy Moore	PTS	6	January 25, 1967	(United States) Palisades Rink, McKeesport, Pennsylvania	
Win	7-7	(United States) Mert Brownfield	PTS	6	December 14, 1966	(United States) Palisades Rink, McKeesport, Pennsylvania	
Win	7-6	(United States) Mert Brownfield	PTS	4	November 14, 1966	(United States) Akron, Ohio	
Win	8-3	(United States) Mac Harrison	KO	3	October 26, 1966	(United States) Akron Armory, Akron, Ohio	
Win	6-13-2	(United States) Larry McGee	KO	2	September 13, 1966	(United States) Cobo Arena, Detroit, Michigan	
Win	4-5	(United States) Vic Brown	TKO	1	August 29, 1966	(United States) Cobo Arena, Detroit, Michigan	
Win	0-2	(United States) John Hall	TKO	1	August 5, 1966	(United States) Cobo Arena, Detroit, Michigan	
Win	0-7	(United States) Gene Hunt	TKO	2	July 11, 1966	(United States) Cobo Hall, Detroit, Michigan	
Win	7-10-1	(United States) Art Miller	KO	1	June 21, 1966	(United States) Canton, Ohio	

== Exhibition boxing record ==
1 fight	0 wins	0 losses
Non-scored	1	

No.	Result	Record	Opponent	Type	Round, time	Date	Location	Notes
1	—N/a	0–0 (1)	(United States) Muhammad Ali	—N/a	3	Jun 15, 1967	(United States) Detroit, Michigan, U.S.	Non-scored bout
