= Joseph Conforte =

Nevada brothel owner

- Born: Giuseppe Christophe Conforte; December 10, 1925; Augusta, Sicily
- Died: March 4, 2019 (aged 93); Rio de Janeiro, Brazil
- Citizenship: United States; Brazil
- Occupations: Brothel owner, restaurateur, boxing manager
- Movement: Legal prostitution
- Criminal charges: 33 counts under RICO, pattern of racketeering
- Criminal status: Deceased
- Spouse: Sally Conforte

Joseph Conforte (December 10, 1925 – March 4, 2019) was an Italian-born legal brothel owner, professional boxing promoter, restaurateur, and philanthropist. Known primarily for owning and operating the Mustang Ranch in Sparks, Nevada, he fled from the United States to Brazil in order to evade the FBI and lived there for the rest of his life.

== Early life ==
Born in Italy, Conforte was the original owner of the Mustang Ranch and a prominent advocate for legal prostitution, becoming a fixture in Sparks, Nevada. He was married to Sally Conforte (née Burgess).

Conforte was born Giuseppe Christophe Conforte in Augusta, Sicily, December 10, 1925, the youngest of one brother and three sisters. His birth date is often mistaken as January 6, 1926. His mother died when he was five.

Giuseppe traveled to Ellis Island on the Rex steamship in December 1937. Giuseppe was given the name Joseph by immigration services. Conforte's father Agostino ran a small produce shop in the Dorchester neighborhood of Boston where he taught young Joe how to sell fruits and vegetables. Agostino also sold bootleg alcohol. As printed in Rolling Stone, 1972: "...this poor immigrant boy from Augusta, Sicily. When he stepped off the boat in New York 35 years ago, he was simply the pudgy, uneducated son of a Massachusetts bootlegger."

Conforte ran away from home to Manhattan in New York City at age fifteen. He moved to Los Angeles in 1942 and soon leased the produce side of the Shermart Market in West Hollywood.

He enlisted in the United States Army on November 1, 1945, before his twentieth birthday. Because of his fake birth date, he was drafted late. He was in the military police in the army and discharged in January 1950 as a staff sergeant.

== Early career ==
Joe Conforte operated illegal brothels in Oakland, California in 1952 and 1953. He moved to Wadsworth, Nevada in 1955 and started the Triangle River Ranch brothel. His operation grew and soon he met and teamed up with Sally Burgess, with whom he had a series of run-ins with law enforcement:

- Clark County, Nevada Undersheriff Lloyd Bell (1959): "We don't care where you (Conforte) stay. But don't stay in this county, or we'll pick you up again."
- Washoe County, Nevada Sheriff C.W. (Bud) Young (1959): "My deputies have been told to pick Conforte up wherever he shows his face in Washoe County."
- Ormsby County (State Capitol), Nevada Sheriff Howard Hoffman (1961): "He was told not to let the sun set on him here in Ormsby County."

The Confortes expanded their prostitution business across Nevada.

In 1960, Conforte was convicted of extortion by threat of Washoe County District Attorney William Raggio, and was sent to prison.

Conforte married Sally Burgess in August 1961.

In 1963, Conforte pleaded guilty to federal tax evasion while in state prison for extortion.

In December 1965, Conforte was released from prison.

In 1967, Joe and Sally Conforte took over the Mustang Bridge Ranch brothel in Storey County, Nevada.

That year, the Nevada Gaming Commission had Conforte on a list to be included in their Black Book of undesirables but did not add him for unexplained reasons.

February 26, 1971, Nevada's Governor Mike O'Callaghan signed anti-vice bill SB214, also known as the county option brothel bill, into law, giving counties the ability to license and regulate brothels while outlawing Clark County-Las Vegas to keep Conforte out.

Mustang Bridge Ranch, with Sally Conforte as licensee, was first in the nation to be licensed under the new state law. The event lead to instant fame for Joe Conforte who assumed the role as leader of the legal prostitution movement.

== 1970s fame and legal prostitution spokesperson ==
Joseph Conforte and/or Mustang Bridge Ranch were featured on television and in magazines, including:

- 1971: TV shows 60 Minutes and Mantrap (Canada), and in Look magazine—photos by Marvin E. Newman
- 1972: The Donahue Show, Rolling Stone—photos by Annie Leibovitz
- 1973: Mantrap, Tomorrow
- 1974: Oui
- 1975: Hustler, The Girls of Nevada by Gabriel Vogliotti, documentary movie Mustang: The House That Joe Built filmed at Mustang Bridge Ranch, interview by Mike Wallace of 60 Minutes, and a cameo in the movie Charley Varrick filmed at Mustang Bridge Ranch
- 1976: New York and New West magazines

Conforte spoke publicly about the need and benefit of legal prostitution to organizations such as the Lions Club, Rotary Club, on national and regional TV shows, and on talk radio. From Rolling Stone, 1972: "...[he] has appeared nationally in magazine and television profiles, and is widely heralded as a folk hero for his fearless, one-man crusade to legalize prostitution in Nevada--and then "the whole goddamn country.""

He was behind a 1971 initiative in California to legalize brothels in that state.

In 1976, Conforte began sponsoring heavyweight Bernardo Mercado (Colombia) who went on to beat Trevor Berbick in 1979 to win the World Boxing Council Continental Americas Heavy Title. Mercado beat Earnie Shavers, the hardest puncher of his time, in March 1980, but lost to Leon Spinks later that year in an elimination bout to determine who would fight for the world title.

The grand opening of Joe and Sally Conforte's Mustang Ranch brothel on May 15, 1976 received little to no coverage by the news media.

== Infamy and crime ==
Conforte reportedly controlled organized crime in Northwestern Nevada, and was quoted in the Nevada State Journal on March 21, 1976: "Conforte said if organized crime elements move into Northern Nevada against his warnings, 'Then there's going to be a war.'" In March 1976, the Washoe County Grand Jury released its Final Report on Joseph Conforte, exposing his Mob ties and political connections across the country. In a statement, Conforte retorted: "The grand jury as it exists today in Washoe County is a colossal fraud. You can put 17 angels with one attorney in a grand jury room for two years, such as these grand jurors have been, and end up with 17 devils."

A week after the Mustang Ranch opened in May 1976, seventh-ranked heavyweight boxer from Argentina, Oscar Bonavena, was shot and killed at the front gate by Joe Conforte's enforcer, Willard Ross Brymer. Conforte was accused of conspiring to murder the boxer but charges were never filed against him.

In 1977, Conforte was convicted of tax evasion and fraud, and sentenced to twenty years in prison; fraud charges were added due to his regularly destroying his financial records.

In 1979, Conforte, while on appeal for tax evasion, was arrested for attempted bribery of the Lyon County, Nevada District Attorney John Giomi.

== Fugitive (1981-1983) ==
In December 1980, Conforte fled the country to avoid prison for the tax evasion conviction and also prosecution for the attempted bribery of John Giomi. Conforte lived as a fugitive of U.S. justice in Brazil for three years. While living as a fugitive, Conforte claimed he had bribed federal judge Harry E. Claiborne (Nevada 1978–1986) who was his former attorney. The Department of Justice granted Conforte a reduced sentence in exchange for his testimony. Conforte gave himself up to the U.S. federal authorities in Miami in December 1983. He provided testimony of alleged bribes paid to Claiborne before a Reno grand jury and Claiborne was indicted based on those claims.

To the embarrassment of the Department of Justice, in Harry E. Claiborne's bribery trial, Conforte flubbed the date of one of the two bribes and Claiborne had a solid alibi on the other bribe Conforte alleged to have made. Jurors were deadlocked and the trial ended in a mistrial. Conforte was prosecuted separately for the crime of attempted bribery of the Lyon County district attorney and sentenced to eighteen months in state prison to run concurrently with his federal sentence.

== Bankruptcy court ==
1982, while in Brazil, Conforte deeded his assets to Sally and she filed for bankruptcy in Reno.

December 1984, Conforte was released from federal prison after serving twelve months of what was an original twenty-year sentence for tax evasion and fraud.

Conforte served no jail time for the state crime of attempted bribery of the Lyon County district attorney.

The IRS drastically reduced the tens of millions of dollars of taxes Joe and Sally Conforte owed to $7.3 million.

Conforte created a public offering of Mustang Ranch stock that could have satisfied the remainder of his debt to the IRS, but three attempts at the IPO failed. Joe then blamed the IRS for interference through his bankruptcy attorney. Conforte's attorney, Peter A. Perry declared on September 21, 1990: "...[IRS] attempts at frustrating the sale[s] were not done in good faith in complete contravention of the agreement between Conforte and IRS to convert the Ranch to a Chapter 7."

== Forfeiture ==
In 1990, her health in decline, Sally deeded her assets to Joe and he prepared to file his own bankruptcy when federal prosecutors obtained emergency forfeiture in court while armed U.S. Treasury Department agents seized the Mustang Ranch and other property. The IRS placed a trustee to operate the brothels in hopes of getting back the taxes Joe and Sally Conforte owed.

Uncle Sam attempting to run a whorehouse became comedic fodder on late-night TV:

- David Letterman: "Overseeing the ranch might be just the thing to get Washington mayor Marion Barry interested in government work again."
- Jay Leno: "If anybody has the experience to run a brothel, the honor should go to Congress."

== IRS swindle and retirement ==
In 1985, Conforte opened a Swiss bank account under the alias José C. Montoya and began skimming profits from Mustang Ranch and sending them to the Swiss account with the aid of several accomplices.

In 1990, Storey County, Nevada commissioners and the sheriff, who controlled county liquor and brothel licensing, demanded the IRS trustee overseeing the Mustang Ranches obtain a brothel license. When the IRS trustee tried to apply, however, the commissioners rezoned the area of Mustang Ranch to outlaw prostitution, forcing the IRS to sell.

Using a proxy, Joe Conforte secretly bought the Mustang Ranch back from the government at pennies on the dollar of what he owed. Conforte's brothel license with Storey County had been maintained throughout all this. The shell company that took control of Mustang Ranch hired Joe to run the place. Conforte was quoted speaking to the Storey County Commission, December 18, 1990: "The doors are already open. I'm here for one reason and one reason only, as a common courtesy, to let you know how it is."

Conforte retired to Rio de Janeiro in 1991. The Mustang Ranch was sold to another company that was later found to be a subsidiary of the offshore A.G.E. Corporation of which Joe was the main shareholder.

Sally Conforte died in 1992.

In November 1995, the United States indicted Joe Conforte in absentia for thirty-three violations under the Racketeer Influenced and Corrupt Organizations Act (RICO), including a pattern of racketeering. A superseding indictment in August 1998 added the A.G.E. Corporation and co-conspirators. U.S. Department of Justice attempts to extradite Joe from Brazil failed.

Former IRS Special Investigator Kemp Shiffer: "Is Joe Conforte a crook? Absolutely he is. He did everything we said he did. Extortion, conspiracy, bribery, racketeering, money laundering, wire fraud; he is guilty of it all. He's a crook, but he is a brilliant crook. The man stayed a step ahead of us the entire time. I worked that case for thirteen years... He slid right through and out of the country."

In 1999, Mustang Ranch was again seized by the federal government and shuttered. The nearby Wild Horse Saloon acquired some of the buildings and furniture along with the name, and started doing business as Mustang Ranch Lounge.

== Death ==
It is believed that Joe Conforte died in Brazil on March 4, 2019, at age 93 from pneumonia associated with Alzheimer's and a heart condition. No news article, death certificate, or public sources corroborate his death. May 5, 2020, racketeering indictments of Conforte from 1995 and 1998 were dismissed by Judge Howard McKibben in the Second Judicial District Court-Reno: “…the Government believes Defendant Conforte and Defendant Neves are both deceased, although the Government has not been able to secure either American or Brazilian death certificates.” Conforte's place of burial or entombment is also unknown.

== See also ==
- Love Ranch
