= La Esmeralda 1879 =

- Directed by: Elías Llanos
- Written by: Elías Llanos
- Production company: Azul Producciones
- Distributed by: Azul Producciones
- Release date: 2010
- Country: Chile
- Language: Spanish
- Budget: $12,000,000 (estimated)
- Box office: $194,513

La Esmeralda 1879 is a 2010 Chilean film about the naval Battle of Iquique, which took place on May 21, 1879 in the harbor of this coastal town in the Tarapacá Region. Directed by Elías Llanos, it stars Fernando Godoy and Jaime Omeñaca.

The budget for the film was $12 million, funded by the Chilean Navy, the Luksic family and other enterprises, and took four years to film.

It requires the creation of two sets of floating ships Huáscar monitor corvette Esmeralda and that took a year to build, plus sophisticated sets on land.
