= Santiago Lovell Jr. =

Argentine boxer

Personal information
- Born: 19 January 1942; Avellaneda, Argentina
- Died: 8 March 2002 (aged 60)

Sport
- Sport: Boxing

Santiago Lovell Jr. (19 January 1942 – 8 March 2002) was an Argentine boxer. He competed in the men's heavyweight event at the 1964 Summer Olympics.
