= Oscar Bonavena =

Argentine boxer (1942–1976)

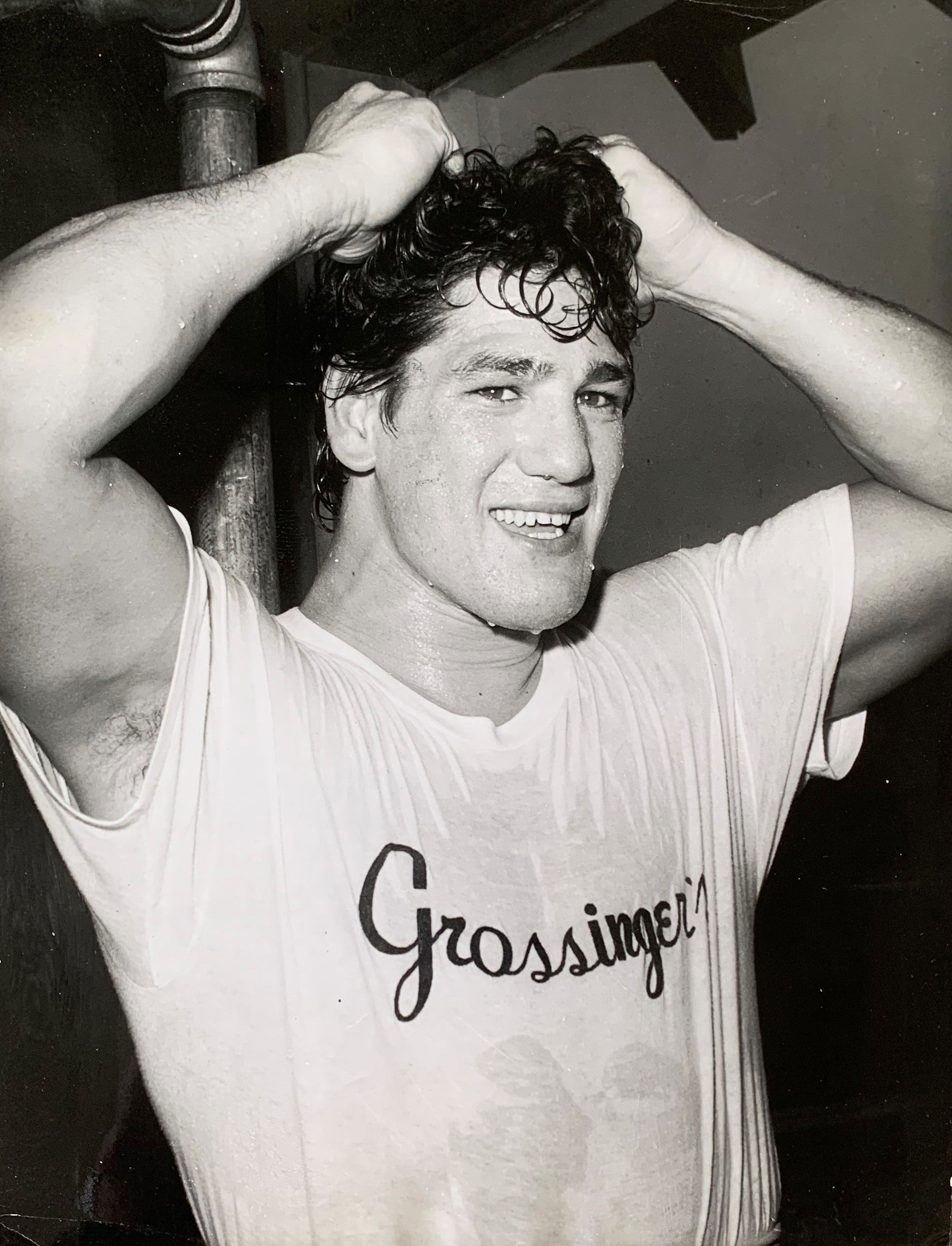
- Bonavena in 1966

Personal information
- Nickname: Ringo
- Born: Oscar Natalio Bonavena; September 25, 1942 Buenos Aires, Argentina
- Died: May 22, 1976 (aged 33) Mustang, Nevada, U.S.
- Height: 5 ft 10 1/2 in (1.79 m)
- Weight: Heavyweight

Boxing career
- Reach: 73 in (185 cm)
- Stance: Orthodox

Boxing record
- Total fights: 68
- Wins: 58
- Win by KO: 44
- Losses: 9 (1 KO)
- Draws: 1
- No contests: 0

Oscar Natalio "Ringo" Bonavena (September 25, 1942 – May 22, 1976) was an Argentine heavyweight professional boxer with a career record of 58 wins, 9 losses and 1 draw. A rugged, wild-swinging puncher, he was nicknamed "Ringo" because of his Beatles haircut, and enjoyed professional success in both Argentina and the United States. Bonavena was shot dead at the age of 33 in Reno, Nevada. He is remembered for giving Joe Frazier and Muhammad Ali hard-fought bouts.

== Life and pro career ==
Oscar Natalio Bonavena was born in Buenos Aires to Italian immigrants. He was a professional boxer, Argentine and South American champion. He also participated in several Argentine TV programs such as the Pepe Biondi Show.

== Early career ==
Bonavena began his early career in New York City under the management of World War II hero and dentist Marvin Goldberg.

Following his pro debut on February 1, 1964, he racked up a quick string of early knockouts. Sometimes fighting twice a month, he lost by decision in February 1965, in only his 15th contest, to the highly rated Zora Folley. Bonavena was far too inexperienced to take on a top veteran like Folley. Three years later he won their rematch by decision.

Returning to Argentina, his winning and knockout streak continued. In mid-1966 he was enticed back to New York where the free-swinging Bonavena ran into trouble outside the ring. He called Muhammad Ali a black kangaroo, and a chicken for draft dodging. When, much later, he saw Ali seated ringside at the George Foreman–Ken Norton fight, he went over and started a big slanging match.

In his pre-fight press conference with Frazier, Bonavena needled effectively by implying that Frazier had a personal hygiene problem. He would start sniffing and grimace. Lawsuits were brought about by reporters with broken cameras; and other such "colorful" behavior. He was always volatile, as trainers soon discovered.

=== Big name contests, Chuvalo and Frazier ===
Bonavena first came to wide public attention after a fine performance: defeating rated contender and Canadian champion George Chuvalo, boxing technically better than expected, and later going the distance against the young hard-hitting great Joe Frazier. In this, their first fight, Bonavena had the future champion down twice in the second round.

=== WBA elimination contests ===
In 1967, after the World Boxing Association stripped Muhammad Ali of the title for refusing to be inducted into the U.S. military, Bonavena participated in that sanctioning body's 1967 tournament to crown a new heavyweight champion. In a strong performance he floored favoured European champion Karl Mildenberger four times, winning by a decision in Frankfurt, West Germany. But he was himself knocked down twice and clearly outboxed by eventual tournament winner Jimmy Ellis in the semi-finals in Louisville, losing by unanimous decision in an upset. Many deemed it the best win of Ellis's career.

=== World Title shot, the Frazier rematch ===
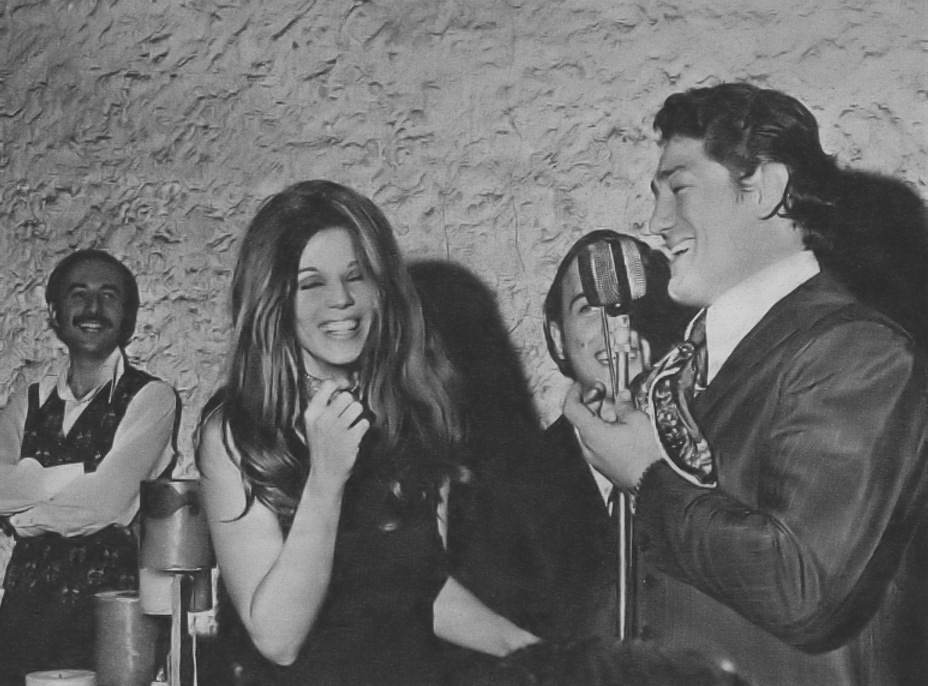
Bonavena with actress Susana Giménez in 1970.

The following year, in 1968, after outpointing Leotis Martin, he got a rematch with Frazier for the heavyweight title in Philadelphia. After a grueling fifteen rounds Bonavena lost the rematch by decision, fighting more defensively than previous. He left with a seriously battered face, as photographed in the Ring magazine. In 1969, he got a draw in a rematch with talented Gregorio Peralta, who he'd outpointed four years earlier for the Argentine title.

=== Versus Ali ===
In December 1970, he fought Ali at Madison Square Garden, in the former champ's second bout after his three-year layoff. Bonavena absorbed punishment throughout but fought well, getting through with various head and body punches. With just under 1:30 left in the 15th and final round, Ali caught Oscar rushing in and floored him with a perfectly placed left hook. Bonavena got up, but was clearly not fully recovered. Ali knocked him down twice more, and the fight was automatically stopped under the three knockdown rule, giving Ali a TKO (technical knockout). The ending was somewhat controversial, as Ali stood over Bonavena as Bonavena was getting up, never going to a neutral corner as the rules of boxing require, which allowed Ali to quickly knockdown Bonavena twice more and automatically end the fight. After the second knockdown, the referee appears to be attempting to guide Ali to a neutral corner, but Ali brushes the referee's arm away and pursues a wobbly Bonavena.

=== Other matches ===
After the loss to Ali in 1970, he had a match against Alvin Lewis (heavyweight and longtime sparing partner of Ali), where Bonavena was hit hard multiple times but eventually won by disqualification. Bonavena fought intermittently for the next few years.

Eventual losses to Floyd Patterson in 1972 and Ron Lyle in 1974 effectively relegated him to lower contender status, though he did well enough in both matches. In the Patterson fight he broke his left hand early, possibly after flooring Patterson in the fourth, and remained an advancing threat to the final bell. It was around 1973 that a match with a then rising Ken Norton was being planned but never materialized.

On February 26, 1976, an overweight and sluggish Bonavena fought what would be his last fight, winning a ten-round decision over the unranked Billy Joiner in Reno.

== Death ==
On 22 May 1976 Bonavena was shot dead at the age of 33 by security guard Willard Ross Brymer at the Mustang Ranch brothel near Reno, Nevada, after having become involved in a conflict with its owner, Joe Conforte. Following a conviction for manslaughter, Brymer spent 15 months in prison. Bonavena's body was returned to Argentina to lie in state at the Luna Park sports arena in Buenos Aires, where 150,000 people filed by. He was survived by a wife and two children.

== Professional boxing record ==
69 fights	59 wins	9 losses
By knockout	44	1
By decision	14	6
By disqualification	1	2
Draws	1	

No.	Result	Record	Opponent	Type	Round	Date	Location	Notes
68	Win	58-9-1	(United States) Billy Joiner	UD	10	1976-02-26	(United States) Reno, Nevada	
67	Win	57-9-1	(Argentina) Reinaldo Gorosito	PTS	10	1975-11-01	(Argentina) Luna Park, Buenos Aires	
66	Win	56-9-1	(Tonga) Mani Vaka	TKO	5 (10)	1974-11-12	(United States) International Center Arena, Honolulu	
65	Win	55-9-1	(Jamaica) Oliver Wright	KO	9 (10)	1974-10-18	(Italy) Rome	
64	Win	54-9-1	(United States) Bob Mashburn	KO	2 (10)	1974-09-21	(Italy) Rome	
63	Win	53-9-1	(Canada) Larry Renaud	KO	3 (10)	1974-07-13	(Italy) Rome	
62	Win	52-9-1	(United States) Larry Middleton	UD	12	1974-05-21	(United States) Capital Centre, Largo, Maryland	
61	Loss	51-9-1	(United States) Ron Lyle	UD	12	1974-03-19	(United States) Denver, Colorado	
60	Win	51-8-1	(United States) Terry Sorrell	TKO	2 (8)	1973-11-20	(United States) Oklahoma City, Oklahoma	
59	Win	50-8-1	(United States) Lou Bailey	UD	10	1973-08-15	(United States) Denver, Colorado	
58	Win	49-8-1	(United States) Roy Wallace	TKO	6 (10)	1973-08-06	(United States) Las Vegas, Nevada	
57	Win	48-8-1	(United States) Leroy Caldwell	TKO	2 (10)	1973-07-23	(United States) Circus Circus Hotel, Las Vegas, Nevada	
56	Loss	47-8-1	(United States) Floyd Patterson	UD	10	1972-02-11	(United States) Madison Square Garden, New York City	
55	Win	47-7-1	(United States) Alvin Lewis	DQ	7 (10)	1971-10-04	(Argentina) Luna Park, Buenos Aires	
54	Loss	46-7-1	(United States) Muhammad Ali	TKO	15 (15)	1970-12-07	(United States) Madison Square Garden, New York City	For NABF/Lineal Heavyweight Titles
53	Win	46-6-1	(Brazil) Luis Pires	RTD	8 (10)	1970-10-29	(Argentina) Luna Park, Buenos Aires	
52	Win	45-6-1	(United States) James J Woody	KO	5 (10)	1970-07-04	(Argentina) Luna Park, Buenos Aires	
51	Win	44-6-1	(Mexico) Manuel Ramos	KO	1 (10)	1970-05-09	(Argentina) Luna Park, Buenos Aires	
50	Win	43-6-1	(Argentina) José Menno	KO	2 (8)	1970-04-24	(Uruguay) Montevideo, Montevideo	
49	Win	42-6-1	(Argentina) Santiago Lovell Jr.	KO	7 (10)	1970-03-21	(Argentina) Luna Park, Buenos Aires	
48	Loss	41-6-1	(Argentina) Miguel Angel Paez	DQ	7 (10)	1970-01-10	(Argentina) Luna Park, Buenos Aires	
47	Win	41-5-1	(Argentina) Santiago Lovell Jr.	TKO	8 (10)	1969-12-13	(Argentina) Luna Park, Buenos Aires	
46	Draw	40-5-1	(Argentina) Gregorio Peralta	PTS	10	1969-08-08	(Uruguay) Palacio Peñarol, Montevideo, Montevideo	
45	Win	40-5	(Germany) Wilhelm Von Homburg	TKO	3 (10)	1969-06-20	(Germany) Sportpalast, Berlin	
44	Win	39-5	(Brazil) Luis Pires	RTD	8 (10)	1969-03-05	(Argentina) Mar del Plata, Buenos Aires	
43	Loss	38-5	(United States) Joe Frazier	UD	15	1968-12-10	(United States) Spectrum, Philadelphia	For NYSAC Heavyweight Title
42	Win	38-4	(United States) Jim Fletcher	KO	1 (10)	1968-11-09	(Argentina) Luna Park, Buenos Aires	
41	Win	37-4	(United States) Leotis Martin	UD	10	1968-09-07	(Argentina) Luna Park, Buenos Aires	
40	Win	36-4	(United States) Zora Folley	MD	10	1968-07-06	(Argentina) Luna Park, Buenos Aires	
39	Win	35-4	(Peru) Roberto Davila	UD	10	1968-06-01	(Argentina) Luna Park, Buenos Aires	
38	Win	34-4	(United States) Lee Carr	KO	3 (10)	1968-04-20	(Argentina) Luna Park, Buenos Aires	
37	Win	33-4	(Argentina) Alberto Benassi	KO	3 (10)	1968-03-08	(Argentina) La Rioja, La Rioja	
36	Win	32-4	(Argentina) Felipe Pedro Marich	TKO	6 (10)	1968-02-16	(Argentina) Córdoba, Córdoba	
35	Loss	31-4	(United States) Jimmy Ellis	UD	12	1967-12-02	(United States) Freedom Hall, Louisville, Kentucky	WBA Heavyweight Title elimination series; semi-finals; Bonavena-Ellis, Quarry-Spencer
34	Win	31-3	(Germany) Karl Mildenberger	UD	12	1967-09-16	(Germany) Waldstadion, Frankfurt, Hesse	WBA Heavyweight Title elimination series; quarter-finals; Bonavena-Mildenberger, Ellis-Martin, Quarry-Patterson, Terrell-Spencer
33	Win	30-3	(Argentina) Carlos Vazquez	TKO	3 (10)	1967-08-05	(Argentina) General Roca, Río Negro	
32	Win	29-3	(Brazil) Luis Pires	RTD	6 (10)	1967-07-22	(Argentina) Luna Park, Buenos Aires	
31	Win	28-3	(Argentina) Pablo Sagrispanti	KO	2 (10)	1967-06-23	(Argentina) Luna Park, Buenos Aires	
30	Win	27-3	(United States) Hubert Hilton	TKO	10	1967-04-08	(Argentina) Luna Park, Buenos Aires	
29	Win	26-3	(Argentina) Jose Giorgetti	KO	9 (10)	1967-01-21	(Argentina) Estadio Bristol, Mar del Plata, Buenos Aires	
28	Win	25-3	(Argentina) Roberto Veliz	KO	4 (10)	1966-12-01	(Argentina) Asociación Mendocina de Boxeo, Mendoza, Mendoza	
27	Win	24-3	(Argentina) Alberto Benassi	TKO	5 (10)	1966-11-18	(Argentina) Rosario, Santa Fe	
26	Win	23-3	(United States) Amos Johnson	UD	10	1966-10-22	(Argentina) Luna Park, Buenos Aires	
25	Win	22-3	(Argentina) Alberto Benassi	KO	5 (10)	1966-10-07	(Argentina) Estadio Bristol, Mar del Plata, Buenos Aires	
24	Loss	21-3	(United States) Joe Frazier	MD	10	1966-09-21	(United States) Madison Square Garden, New York City	
23	Win	21-2	(Canada) George Chuvalo	MD	10	1966-06-23	(United States) Madison Square Garden, New York City	
22	Win	20-2	(Argentina) Jose Giorgetti	UD	10	1966-04-16	(Argentina) Luna Park, Buenos Aires	
21	Loss	19-2	(Argentina) Jose Giorgetti	DQ	8 (10)	1966-03-12	(Argentina) Estadio Bristol, Mar del Plata, Buenos Aires	
20	Win	19-1	(Argentina) Bruno Segura	KO	2 (10)	1966-02-12	(Argentina) Mar del Plata, Buenos Aires	
19	Win	18-1	(United States) Billy Daniels	KO	1 (10)	1965-11-13	(Argentina) Luna Park, Buenos Aires	
18	Win	17-1	(Argentina) Hector Wilson	KO	2 (10)	1965-10-22	(Argentina) Concepción, Tucumán	
17	Win	16-1	(Argentina) Pablo Sagrispanti	TKO	1 (10)	1965-10-09	(Argentina) Rosario, Santa Fe	
16	Win	15-1	(Argentina) Gregorio Peralta	UD	12	1965-09-04	(Argentina) Luna Park, Buenos Aires	Won Argentinian Heavyweight Title
15	Win	14-1	(Argentina) Alberto Gonzales	KO	2 (10)	1965-08-06	(Argentina) Comodoro Rivadavia, Chubut	
14	Win	13-1	(Argentina) Eduardo Cartelli	KO	1 (12)	1965-07-23	(Argentina) Córdoba, Córdoba	
13	Win	12-1	(Argentina) Rodolfo Diaz	TKO	4 (10)	1965-06-26	(Argentina) Luna Park, Buenos Aires	
12	Win	11-1	(Argentina) Rogelio Gregorutti	KO	2 (10)	1965-05-28	(Argentina) San Miguel de Tucumán, Tucumán	
11	Win	10-1	(Argentina) Carlos Vazquez	KO	3 (10)	1965-04-30	(Argentina) Salón de los Deportes, Bahía Blanca, Buenos Aires	
10	Win	9-1	(Argentina) Rene Sosa	KO	2 (10)	1965-04-16	(Argentina) Mar del Plata, Buenos Aires	
9	Loss	8-1	(United States) Zora Folley	UD	10	1965-02-26	(United States) Madison Square Garden, New York City	
8	Win	8-0	(United States) Billy Stephan	TKO	6 (10)	1964-12-18	(United States) Madison Square Garden, New York City	
7	Win	7-0	(United States) Dick Wipperman	UD	10	1964-11-13	(United States) Madison Square Garden, New York City	
6	Win	6-0	(United States) Tom McNeeley	TKO	5 (8)	1964-08-21	(United States) Madison Square Garden, New York City	
5	Win	5-0	(Greece) Byron Stoimenides	KO	1 (8)	1964-05-29	(United States) Madison Square Garden, New York City	
4	Win	4-0	(Canada) Leslie Borden	TKO	3 (10)	1964-05-05	(United States) Sunnyside Garden, Queens, New York	
3	Win	3-0	(The Bahamas) Wendell Newton	TKO	5 (6)	1964-03-10	(United States) Sunnyside Garden, Queens, New York	
2	Win	2-0	(United States) Everett Copeland	KO	1 (6)	1964-02-04	(United States) Sunnyside Garden, Queens, New York	
1	Win	1-0	(United States) Lou Hicks	TKO	1 (4)	1964-01-03	(United States) Madison Square Garden, New York City	

== See also ==
- List of homicides in Nevada
- Luis Ángel Firpo
- José María Gatica
- Justo Suárez
