= Günther Messner =

Italian mountain climber

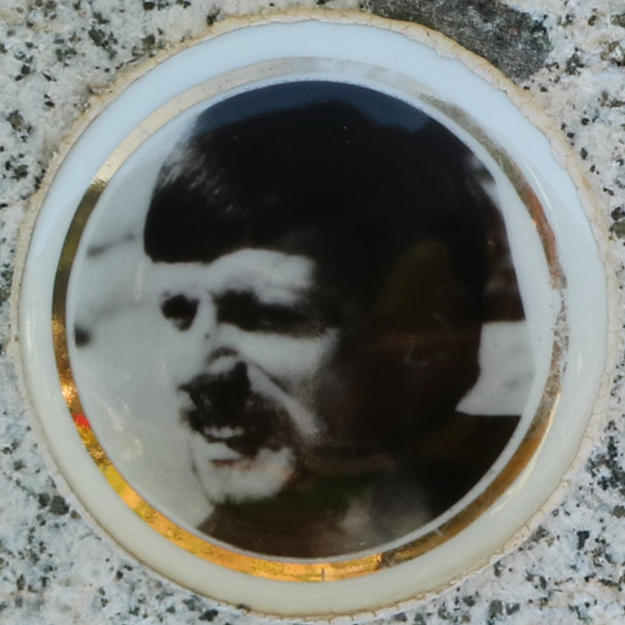
- Born: May 18, 1946
- Died: June 29, 1970
- Occupation: Mountaineer

This article has been translated from German into English, from the German version of Wikipedia.

Günther Messner (18 May 1946 – 29 June 1970) was an Italian mountaineer from South Tyrol and the younger brother of Reinhold Messner. Günther climbed some of the most difficult routes in the Alps during the 1960s, and joined the Nanga Parbat-Expedition in 1970 just before the beginning of the expedition due to an opening within the team.

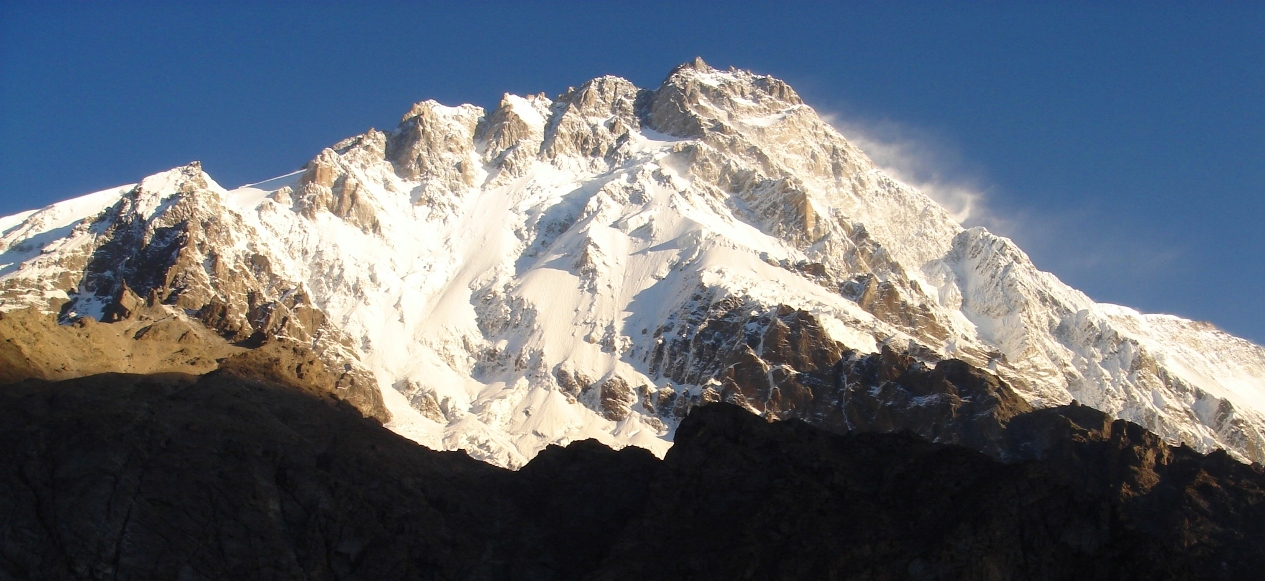
Rupal face of Nanga Parbat

== Death on Nanga Parbat ==
Günther was a member of a 1970 expedition to Nanga Parbat led by Karl Herrligkoffer. Herrligkoffer had already organized six expeditions to Nanga Parbat and was said to be obsessed with the mountain after his half-brother, climber Willy Merkl, along with eight others, died on the peak in 1934.

On 26 June 1970 Günther, his brother Reinhold and Gerhard Baur were at Camp 5 watching for a signal rocket from base camp. Blue indicated good weather, red poor. Radio Peshawar reported good weather, so the expedition leader Herrligkoffer fired a rocket, but it exploded red, not blue. Consequently, Reinhold commenced a solo quick-and-light attack without gear shortly after 2 a.m. to avoid the presumed bad weather. Günther and Gerhard were still asleep. Reinhold had a difficult time finding his way up the Merkl Couloir by headlamp but emerged at dawn. At sunrise the next morning, Günther and Gerhard Baur were installing rope to aid Reinhold's return. Baur recounts the story that Günther did something impulsive in that he impatiently dumped the ropes they were fixing and sprinted into and then soloed the difficult Merkl Couloir. Günther and Reinhold reached the summit together late in the afternoon, at which point Günther started showing signs of exhaustion, possibly due to the effort he made in trying to catch up with Reinhold earlier in the day.

What happened next was a matter of controversy for many years. According to Reinhold, the two brothers stayed near the summit overnight in an emergency bivouac (with only space blankets) close to the so-called Merkle-notch (named in honor of Herrligkoffer's half brother) since a night descent seemed impossible on the Rupal face due to Günther's exhaustion and altitude sickness. Reinhold states that Günther worried that reversing down the sheer Rupal Face would be dangerous. He says that Günther suggested a descent via the gentler Diamir Face.

The next morning, Reinhold recalls that Günther was delirious. Reinhold says that he started shouting for help at 6 a.m. and about three hours later, he saw Felix Kuen and Peter Scholz in the Merkl Couloir, heading for the summit. The two parties got to within about 100 yards of each other and there was some communication, albeit with difficulty. "Are you both OK?" Kuen yelled. "Yes! Everything's OK," Reinhold replied, controversially. Kuen and Scholz then continued to the summit.

Reinhold and Günther were then forced to do a second bivouac at the Mummery Rib. By the next morning, the third day without shelter or water, Günther could only stumble slowly along. The multi-day descent had brought the two climbers to the limit of their physical and mental strength, and was to end in tragedy when Günther disappeared at the bottom of the Diamir face, most likely killed by an ice avalanche during the descent. Reinhold, walking ahead and facing exhaustion, severe frostbite and the loss of his brother, continued down along the Diamir valley until he found some local shepherds, who helped him.

The expedition members Max von Kienlin and Hans Saler claimed that Reinhold declined the assistance of others when his brother Günther became ill. The main assertion by Hans Saler and Max von Kienlin was that Reinhold's decision to go down the Diamir face was not born of emergency, as suggested by Günther in his fatigue, but a gambit Reinhold had planned and had openly discussed with members of the team. Reinhold's version of events was that "He (Günther) had to get lower. We couldn't continue along the southwest ridge either, because it is very long and up and down. And we couldn't wait for the others to come, because they couldn't have gotten to us until the following morning, and another day and night at that altitude would have been fatal for Günther. That left only the Diamir Face". Reinhold was subsequently widely quoted as saying "We had a choice between waiting for death and going out to meet it".

== Remains and controversy ==
For the next 30 years the dispute over the events of this expedition became possibly the most controversial fight in modern-day climbing. The dispute spawned more than a dozen lawsuits, countless attacks and counterattacks, a revenge theory (stemming from a post-expedition love affair between Reinhold Messner and von Kienlin's wife), and numerous efforts by Reinhold to find Günther and vindicate himself.

In July 2000, climber Hanspeter Eisendle found a human fibula at the base of the Diamir wall of Nanga Parbat. Due to the decomposition of the DNA, it could not be definitively determined at that time whether the bone belonged to Günther Messner — it was possible that the bone could have come from climbers who died on the mountain in 1962. A subsequent analysis at the University of Innsbruck strongly suggested that the fibula was Günther Messner's.

On 17 July 2005, three local Pakistani guides found the remains of a climber at an altitude of 4,300 metres on the Diamir face, an hour's climb above the Diamir base camp, near where Reinhold had believed Günther was lost. A search of the talus yielded a leather boot entombing a wool-socked foot, and clothing that the climbers quickly realized could be from the body of Günther Messner. Reinhold trekked to the spot and recognised the boot (a brown leather Lowa Triple Boot) and jacket on the body as those of his brother. Reinhold took the boot with him, with the bones still inside. The expedition doctor, Munich-based anesthesiologist Rudolf Hipp, harvested tissue samples for the DNA testing.

On 21 October 2005 scientists at the University of Innsbruck completed a DNA analysis of tissue samples from the remains, and confirmed that the remains were that of Günther. This evidence supported the version of events told by Reinhold, that Günther was on the west side of the mountain when he was killed and not on the descent through the Rupal Wall.

Despite the undisputed DNA evidence, controversy persists. Residual argument revolves largely around whether Günther perished in a fall near the summit, upper or middle part of the Diamir Face, versus toward the bottom, where Reinhold said he had last seen his brother. The argument is based on glacial movement over a period of 35 years and the location where the remains were found. Saler has asserted that if Günther had died in the lower third of the face (as described by Reinhold) then the remains would have been found much lower than 14,110 feet (where they were reportedly recovered). The existence of a disputed handwritten note described in the 2003 book by von Kienlin, The Traverse, was allegedly a "confession" recorded by von Kienlin documenting a conversation between Reinhold and von Kienlin in a motel room in Gilgit, Pakistan, before they both returned home. The note says that "I lost Günther" and "For hours I was up there yelling for him. I don't know why, but he couldn't hear me. He was doing very badly. He didn't make it. Maybe he fell."

In June 2022, Pakistani locals found the second shoe belonging to Günther. A picture of the same was also posted by Reinhold on Instagram.

== Funeral ==
On 8 September 2005, the remains were burned at the foot of Nanga Parbat on a pyre in Tibetan tradition. Also borrowing from Tibetan tradition, Reinhold and his expedition team of 14 trekkers and two journalists built a chorten, a square-shaped stack of stones, as a monument. The participants sang "yelo Lak, the gods were merciful," and threw rice into the air.

== See also ==
- List of deaths on eight-thousanders
