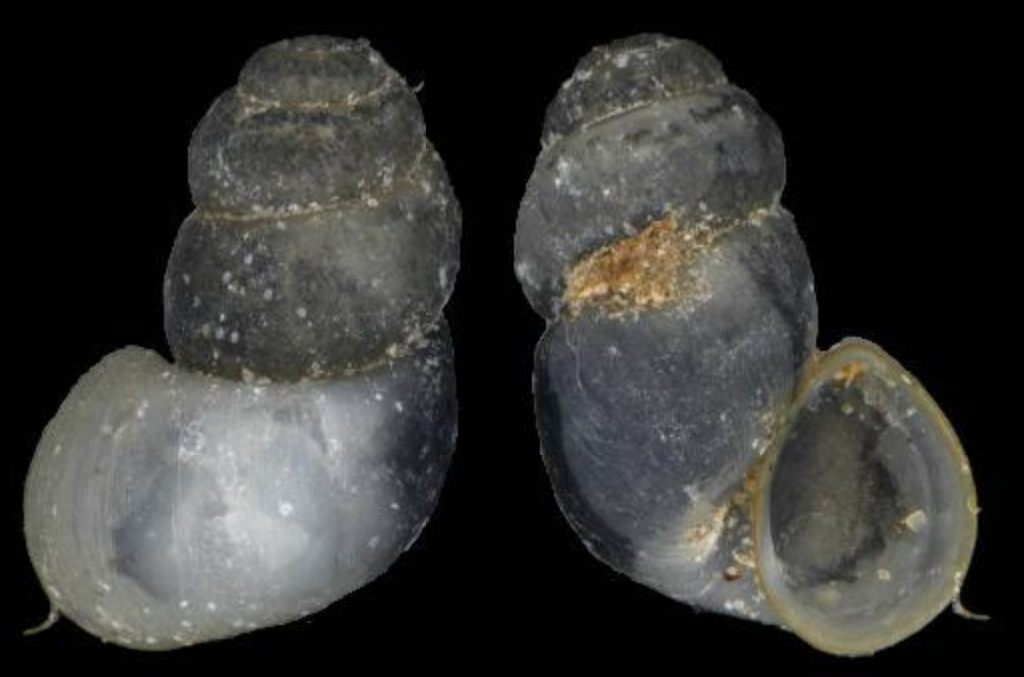
- Dorsal (left) and ventral (right) view of Bythinella conica's shell

Conservation status
- Least Concern (IUCN 3.1)

Scientific classification
- Kingdom: Animalia
- Phylum: Mollusca
- Class: Gastropoda
- Subclass: Caenogastropoda
- Order: Littorinimorpha
- Family: Bythinellidae
- Genus: Bythinella
- Species: B. conica

Binomial name
- Bythinella conica (Clessin, 1910)

Synonyms
- Bythinella (Bythinella) conica Clessin, 1910

= Bythinella conica =

Species of freshwater snail

Bythinella conica is a species of freshwater snail in the family Bythinellidae. The species can only be distinguished from Bythinella austriaca through DNA analyses and geographic distribution. B. conica comprises two subspecies, B. conica conica and B. conica isolata, which are genetically similar but differ in morphology and region of occurrence. B. conica isolata's smaller shell is possibly an adaptation to its colder habitat. Stefan Clessin first described B. conica in 1910, from a B. conica conica specimen found near Burgkirchen an der Alz in Germany. Hans D. Boeters described the subspecies B. conica isolata in 2006, from a specimen found on the Geigelstein mountain, also in Germany.

B. conica conica occurs in Germany and Austria, while B. conica isolata is known only from alpine meadow springs on Geigelstein. Both subspecies live in clear, cold, nutrient-poor water. It is sensitive to changes in pH and water balance, making B. conica a useful bioindicator of wetland quality. Researchers believe B. conica spawns from October (late autumn), though direct observations are lacking. Where B. conica isolata lives, springs can dry out in summer, and snails of this subspecies go dormant in mud under stones until the water returns.

== Description ==
B. conica cannot be distinguished from Bythinella austriaca by shell morphology or anatomy, but DNA analyses and geographic distribution can separate them. B. conica consists of two subspecies (B. conica conica and B. conica isolata) which are genetically similar but differ regarding their geographic distribution and morphology.

=== Bythinella conica conica ===
B. conica conica's shell is small, conical, and has fine incisions. Its shell has a length between 2.25–3.05 mm (0.089–0.120 in) and diameter between 1.45–1.85 mm (0.057–0.073 in). The spire (pointed upper part of the shell) ends in a blunt apex (the shell's tip) and is often encrusted with brown mud. The shell has five whorls (spiral turns) that are fairly convex and separated by deep sutures (lines separating whorls). The whorls increase in size toward the aperture (the shell's opening) at a moderate pace, with the body whorl (the last, bigger whorl) making up slightly less than one-third of the total shell height. The aperture is oval-shaped and pulled slightly toward the right when viewed with the aperture facing the observer and the spire pointing upwards. The aperture is slightly pointed at the top. The peristome (edge of the aperture) is sharp, continuous, and does not expand. B. conica conica has gills with 27–28 filaments arranged along it. The colour of B. conica conica's body can change from white to bright green depending on the presence of algae.

=== Bythinella conica isolata ===
Compared to B. conica conica, B. conica isolata has a smaller shell, which Boeters and Knebelsberger suggested in 2012 was a morphological variation arising from its colder habitat. The subspecies has a shell length between 1.85–2.65 mm (0.073–0.104 in) and diameter between 1.20–1.60 mm (0.047–0.063 in). The shell is oval or slightly conical, with a nearly flat or rounded apex. It has 3 3/4 fairly curved whorls separated by deep sutures. The body whorl rises clearly where it meets the preceding whorl. The aperture is slightly slanted and oval-shaped. The lower edge of the aperture is barely broadened, while the edge near the columella (the central pillar running internally through the shell, around which the whorls coil) is sharp. The columella is sometimes filled with sediment but is fused just above the umbilicus (a small opening at the base of the shell, directly opposite the apex). The umbilicus is barely perceptible.

Boeters and Knebelsberger have described B. conica isolata's body anatomy in 2012 as follows: the animal has a grey mantle (tissue covering the animal's visceral mass) and a gill with 16–17 filaments arranged along it. Its gills have thus fewer filaments than B. conica conica and are also larger. The intestine in males has a narrow V-shaped bend, while in females it has a U-shape. In males, the reproductive organ is unpigmented. The penis is two times as long as the accessory organ and drop-shaped. However, the penis can sometimes be only as long as the accessory organ or only slightly longer and with a more rounded tip. The gland of the accessory organ is about three times as long as that organ. In females, the genital tract has a drop-like receptaculum (sperm storage sac) and a pedunculus (connecting the receptaculum to the rest of the genitalia) which surrounds the receptaculum in a U-form.

== Taxonomy ==
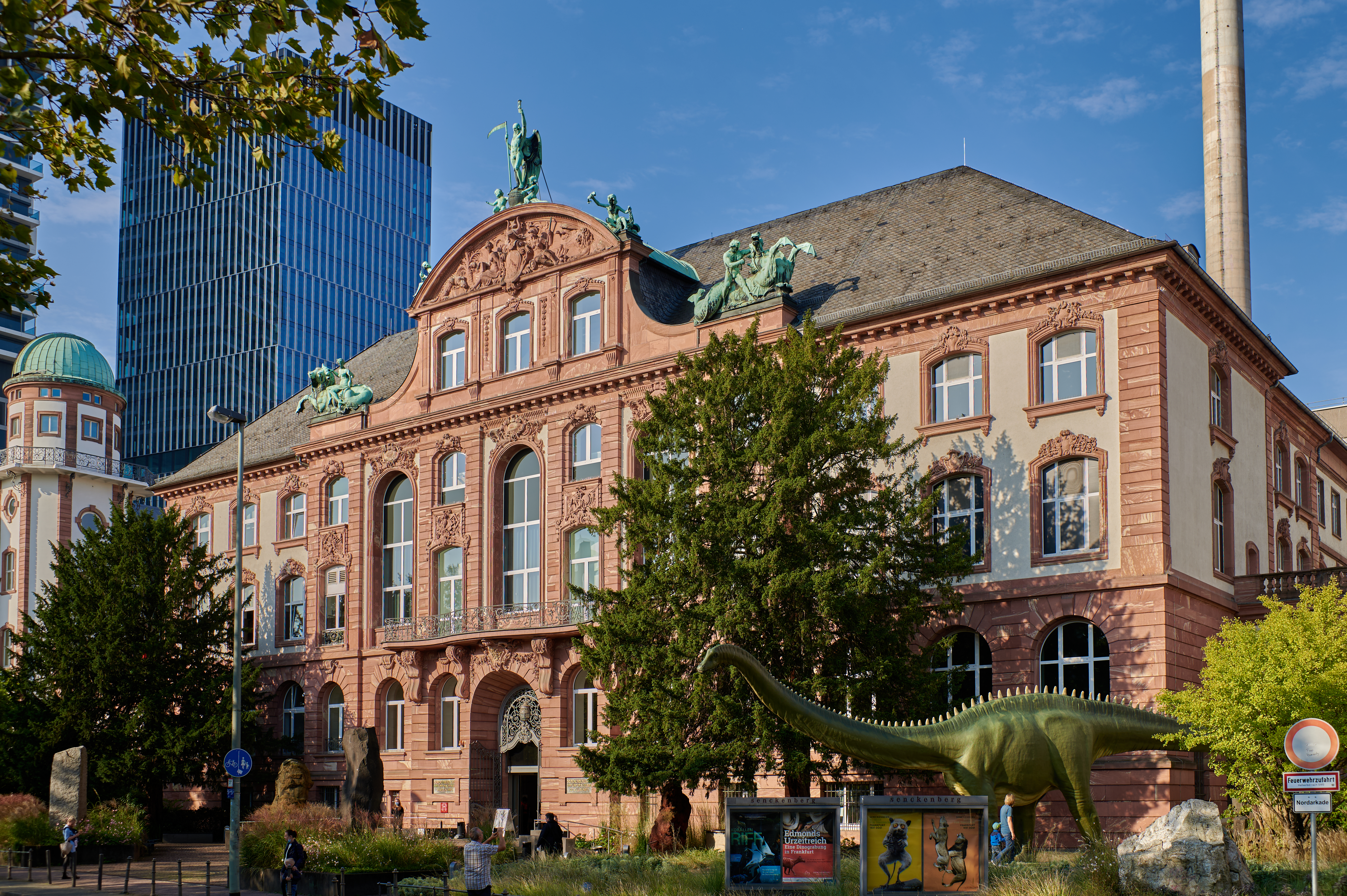
The Senckenberg Museum in Frankfurt, where the neotype of B. conica conica and holotype of B. conica isolata are stored.

B. conica was first described in 1910 by Stefan Clessin, a German malacologist, based on a specimen of B. conica conica found in a deposit of the river Alz near Burgkirchen an der Alz, Germany. Clessin's original shell collection was destroyed during World War II, such that its neotype (a replacement specimen selected to represent the species) is stored at the Senckenberg Research Institute and Natural History Museum in Frankfurt. Since the original description of B. conica corresponds to the B. conica conica subspecies, it is the nominate subspecies for B. conica. The subspecies B. conica isolata was first described by German malacologist Hans D. Boeters in 2006 at the Geigelstein mountain at 1,510 m (4,950 ft) above sea level. Its holotype (original specimen used to describe the group) is also located at the Senckenberg Research Institute.

In 2012 Boeters and Knebelsberger proposed the following taxonomic classification for B. conica based on a combination of genetic analyses, shell morphology, anatomy, geographic distribution, and ecological features:

- - - - - Bythinella conica
        - Bythinella austriaca
      - Bythinella bavarica
    - Bythinella compressa
    - Bithynia tentaculata

== Distribution and habitat ==
=== Distribution ===
B. conica occurs in Germany (B. conica conica and B. conica isolata) and Austria (B. conica conica).

==== Bythinella conica conica ====
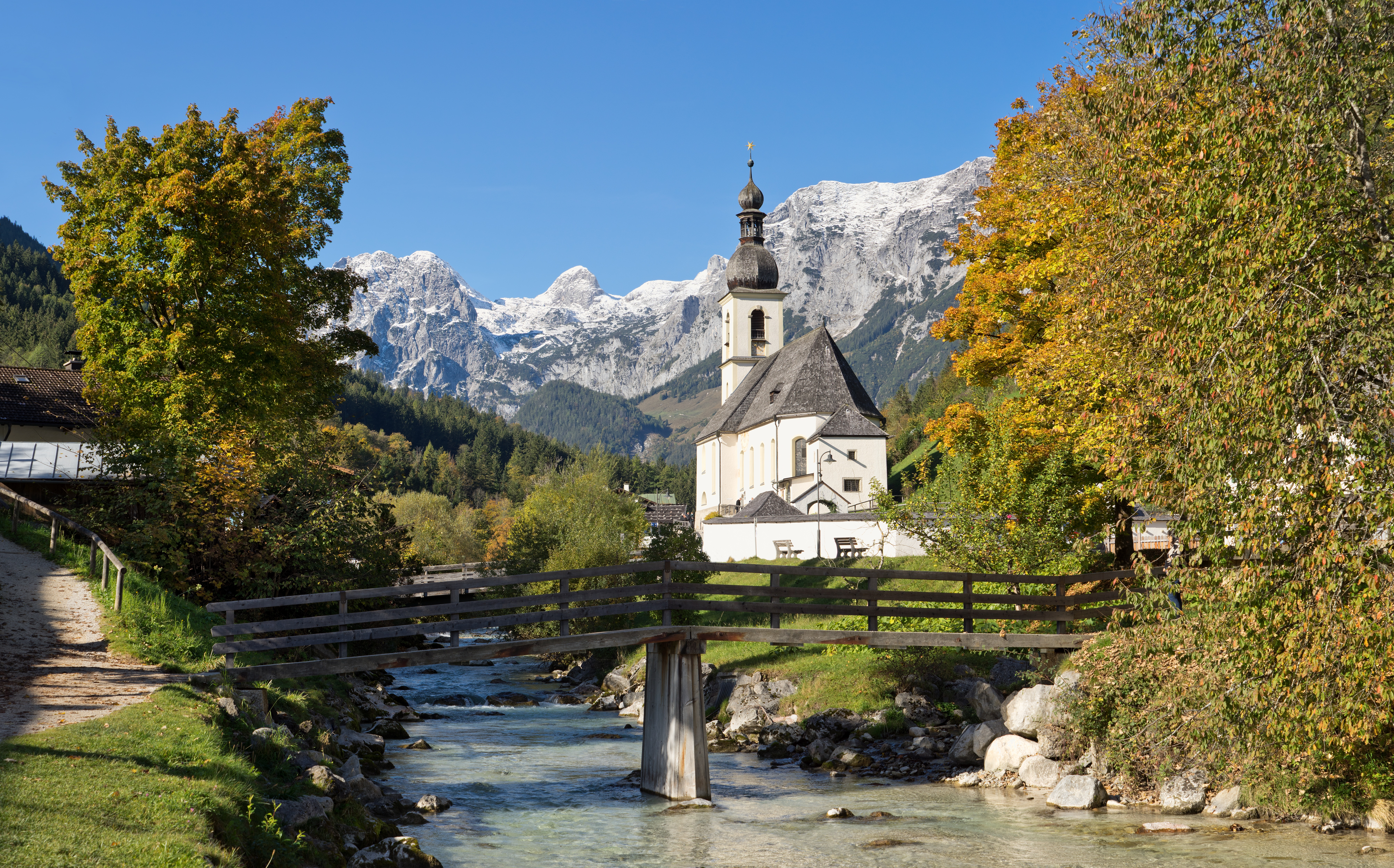
Ramsau bei Berchtesgaden, where B. conica conica is commonly found.

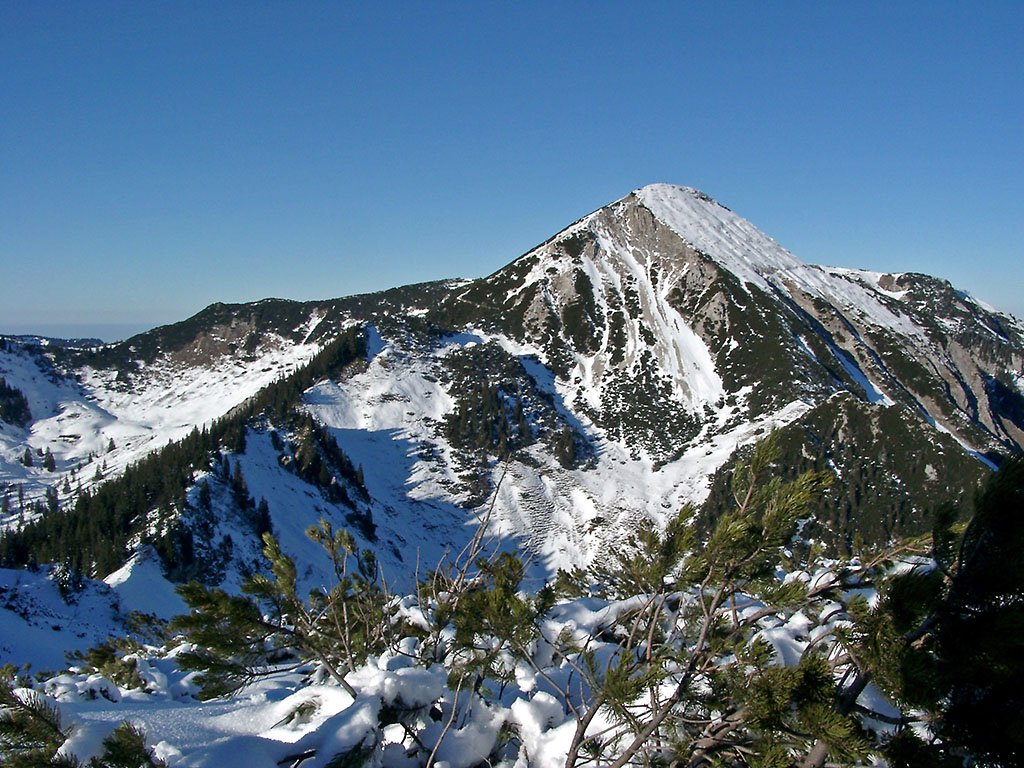
The Geigelstein mountain is the only place where B. conica isolata has been found as of 2012.

In Germany, B. conica conica occurs in the alpine municipality of Ramsau bei Berchtesgaden. In 2024 Klar-Weiß reported B. conica conica's occurrence in the region as "common" to "very common", estimating over 100 individuals per m^{2} at one of the sampled springs. In 2025 the subspecies was also found near Attenkirchen.

In Austria, B. conica conica has been reported at various tufa springs throughout Upper Austria. It was also found near the city of Salzburg, at its surrounding mountains, at a ditch near Obertrumersee and at a stream within the Untersberg Landscape and Plant Protection Area.

The distribution of B. conica conica is one of the features used to distinguish it from B. austriaca. According to Boeters and Knebelsberger (2012), while both are found in the Danube basin, B. conica conica lives upstream of the Enns tributary, while B. austriaca lives beyond the Traisen tributary.

==== Bythinella conica isolata ====
B. conica isolata has only been found in alpine meadow springs between 1,385–1,510 m (4,544–4,954 ft) at the Geigelstein mountain in Germany.

=== Habitat ===
B. conica lives in clear, nutrient-poor water. Since the species is sensitive to changes in environmental pH and water balance, it can serve as bioindicators, informing about the quality of wetland habitats. B. conica isolata specifically inhabits lives under stones by springs and was once found under a "knee-deep" layer of coarse scree.

B. conica populations are most dense in cold habitats. The water temperature in the River Alz at Burgkirchen, where B. conica conica was first described, was 10 °C (50 °F) as measured in June 2009. Water temperature at B. conica isolata habitats during the same period did not exceed 4.5 °C (40.1 °F).

== Ecology and behaviour ==
Boeters and Knebelsberger inferred in 2012 that B. conica spawns starting from October (late autumn), since springs reach their maximum temperature about two months after the air temperature has peaked, although they did not directly observe spawning.

At the elevations where B. conica isolata occurs, springs may dry out from summer to October and the snails enter a dormant state in mud under stones.
