= Chiemgau Alps =

Mountain range in Germany and Austria

Coordinates: 47°43′N 12°33′E

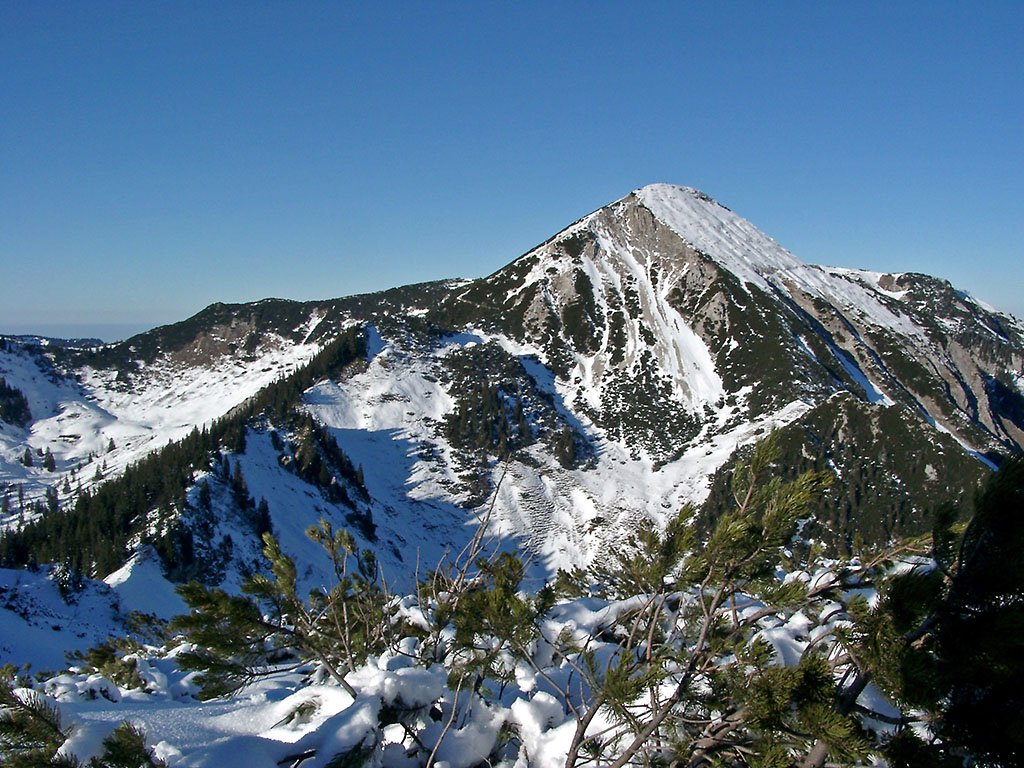
- Geigelstein (1808 m) seen from the southern peak Breitenstein

Highest point
- Peak: Sonntagshorn
- Elevation: 1,961 m (6,434 ft)

Dimensions
- Length: 60 kilometres (37 mi)
- Width: 25–30 kilometres (16–19 mi)

Geography
- Countries: Germany and Austria
- States: Bavaria, Salzburg and Tirol
- Parent range: Northern Limestone Alps

Geology
- Orogeny: Alpine orogeny
- Rock ages: Mesozoic and Cenozoic
- Rock type: sedimentary rocks

The Chiemgau Alps (German: Chiemgauer Alpen) are a mountain range in the Northern Limestone Alps and belong to the Eastern Alps. They are crossed by the Austria–Germany border: their major part is situated in Bavaria, Germany, and only a small section is within the states of Salzburg and Tirol in Austria. They reach their highest elevation (1,961 m (6,434 ft)) in the Sonntagshorn, a peak straddling the German-Austrian border.

== Geography ==
The Chiemgau Alps stretch from the Inn River in the West to the Salzach River in the East and cover a distance of 60 km (37 mi) in strike direction; their maximum width in North-South direction amounts to about 25–30 km (16–19 mi). They are surrounded by the following mountain ranges:

- Bavarian Prealps in the West
- Kaisergebirge in the Southwest
- Leoganger Steinberge in the South
- Loferer Steinberge in the Southeast
- Berchtesgaden Alps in the Southeast and East

Their northern edge often drops off quite drastically to the foothills.

=== Major peaks ===
- Sonntagshorn - 1,961 m
- Steinplatte - 1,869 m
- Geigelstein - 1,808 m
- Zwiesel - 1,781 m
- Dürrnbachhorn - 1,776 m
- Hochstaufen - 1,771 m
- Fellhorn - 1,764 m
- Hochgern - 1,748 m
- Rauschberg - 1,671 m
- Hochries - 1,569 m
- Ristfeuchthorn - 1,569 m
- Klausenberg - 1,548 m
- Unternberg - 1,425 m
- Heuberg - 1,338 m

Peaks for rock climbing:

- Hörndlwand 1684 m
- Kampenwand 1664 m
