= Weitsee =

Lake in Germany

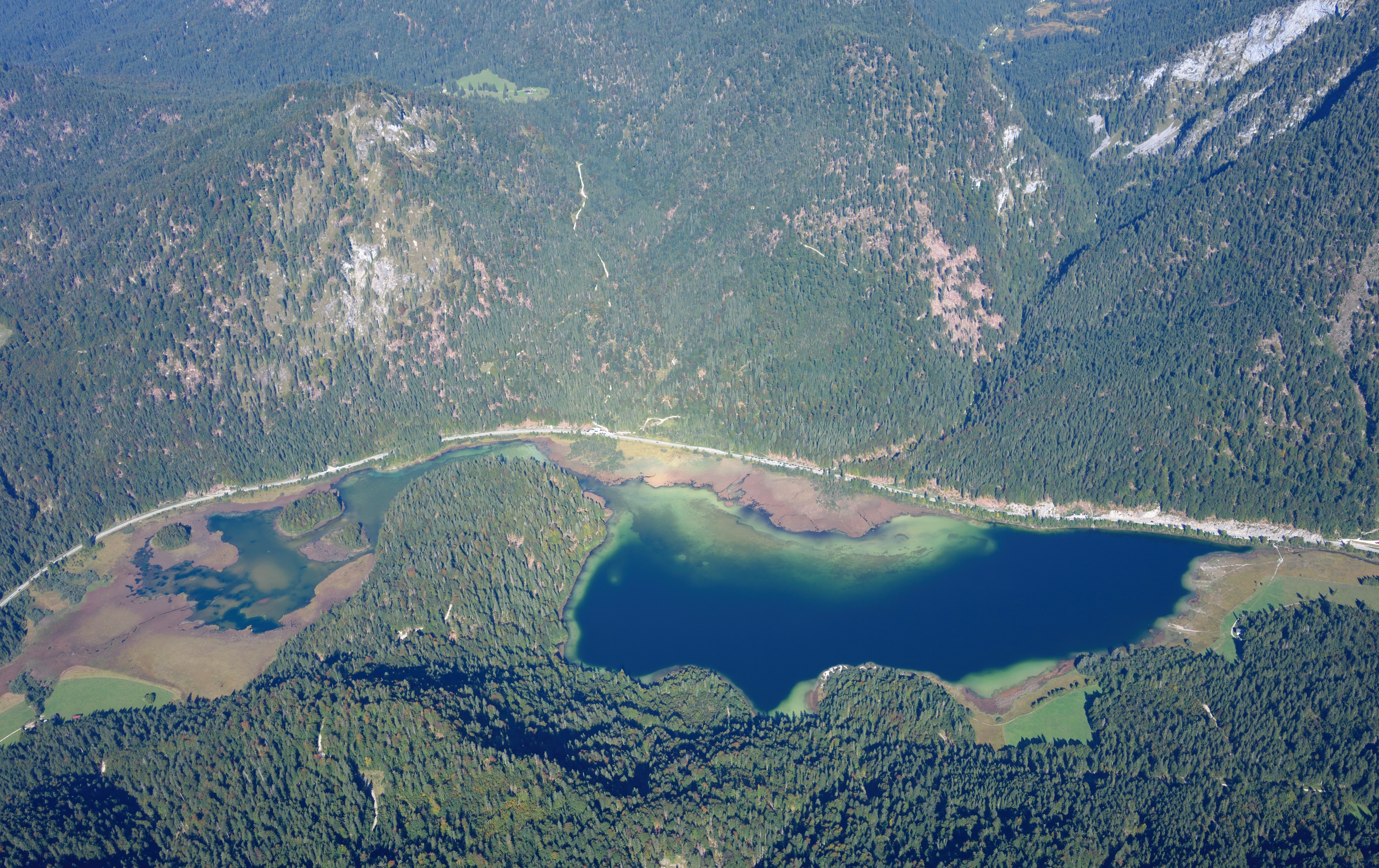

- Location within Bavaria
- Location: Bavaria
- Coordinates: 47°40′57″N 12°33′40″E
- Primary inflows: Spring
- Basin countries: Germany
- Max. length: 2.67 km (1.66 mi)
- Max. width: 0.24 km (0.15 mi)
- Surface area: 63.60 ha (157.2 acres)
- Average depth: 3.50 m (11.5 ft)
- Max. depth: 9.30 m (30.5 ft)
- Water volume: 2,217,000 m^{3} (78,300,000 cu ft)
- Shore length^{1}: 7.60 km (4.72 mi)
- Surface elevation: 753.00 m (2,470.47 ft)
- Settlements: Seegatterl, Reit im Winkl
- ^{1} Shore length is not a well-defined measure.

Weitsee is a small lake on between Reit im Winkl and Ruhpolding with an area of 63.60 ha and a maximum depth of 9.30 m. The lake itself is separated into a shallow western and a deeper eastern part by a mountain peninsula. It is the first lake in the Dreiseengebiet (Three Lake Area) followed by the Mittersee and Lödensee. The lakes are located in the valley between the Gurnwandkopf und Dürrnbachhorn next to the Deutsche Alpenstraße B305 (German Alpine Street).

Only a few small tributaries bring water to the lake. Most of the water comes from a 5 m deep spring which is located at the narrowest part of the lake. All the water from the outflow of the lake ends in seepage at the end of the Lödensee after it has gone through Mittersee. Geological research showed that the water finds its way under the Hochgern mountain to the bog near Bergen, Upper Bavaria.

The lake with its beach, the clean water and the distance to the next village attract many people during the summer. The beach also has a nudist part which is located furthest from the street. In the winter, the cross-country ski run between Reit im Winkl and Ruhpolding crosses the lake.

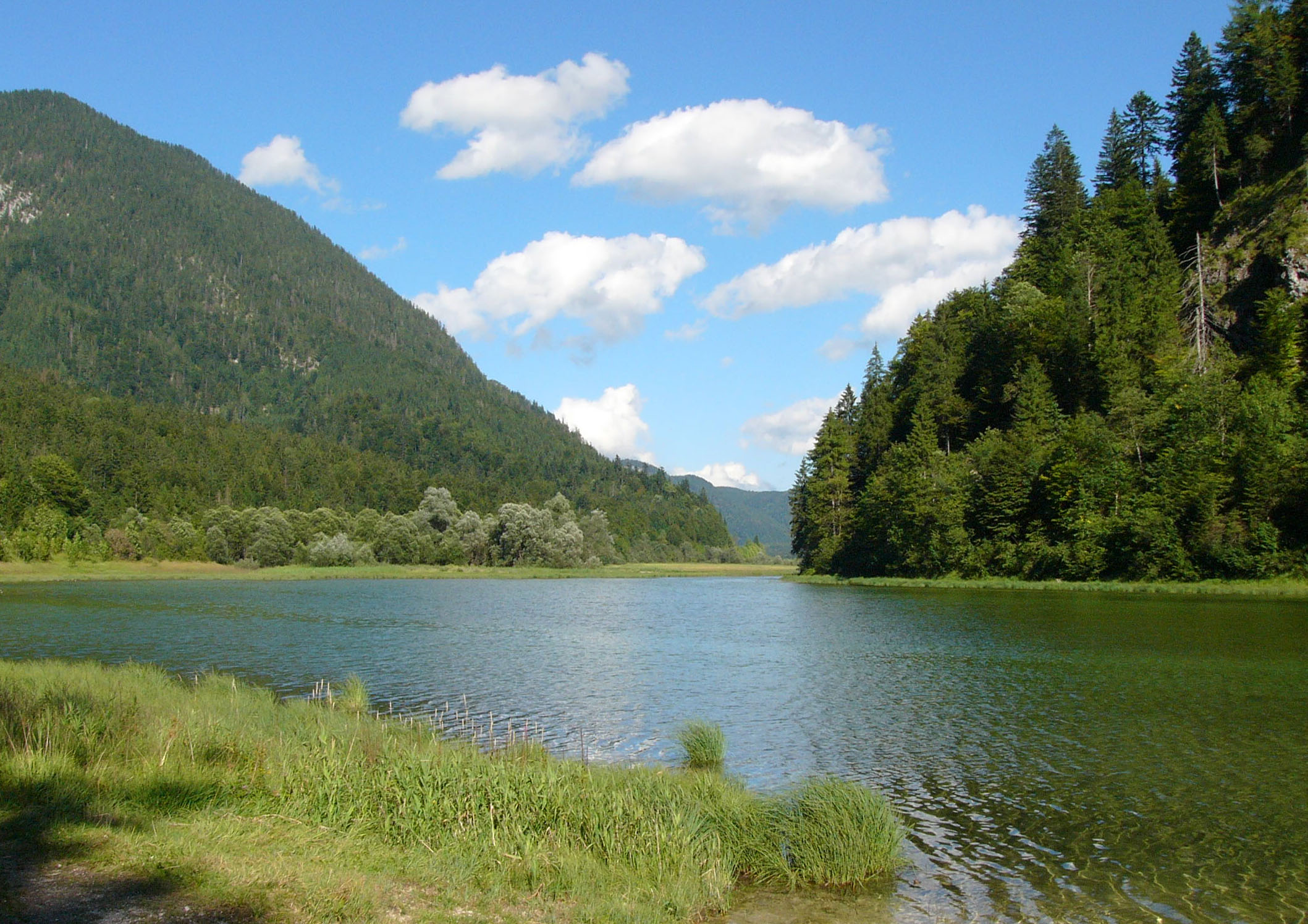
Weitsee

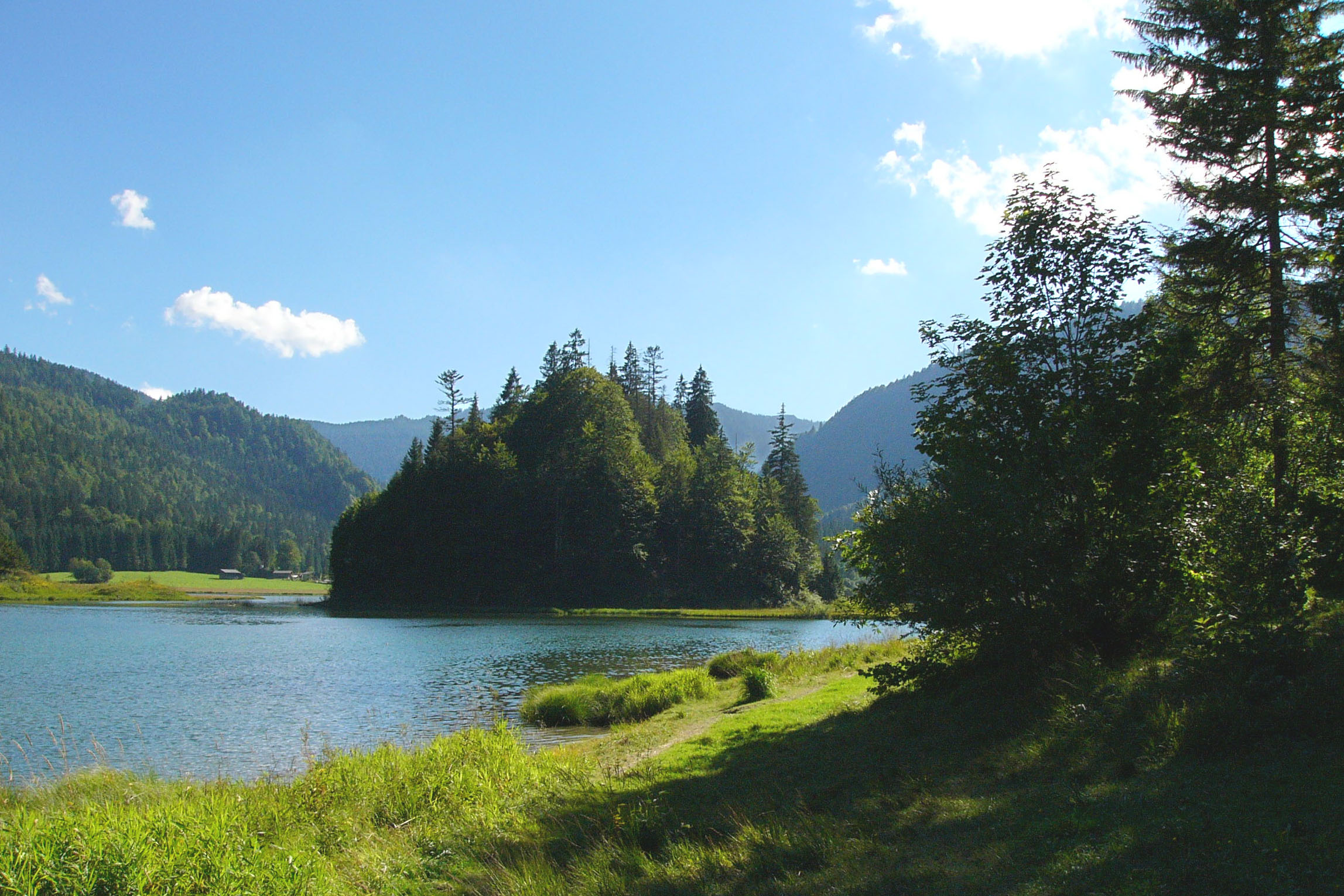
Weitsee from the east

== See also ==
- List of lakes in Bavaria
