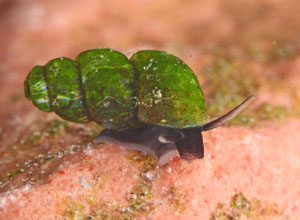
- Bythinella cylindrica

Conservation status
- Critically Endangered (IUCN 3.1)

Scientific classification
- Kingdom: Animalia
- Phylum: Mollusca
- Class: Gastropoda
- Subclass: Caenogastropoda
- Order: Littorinimorpha
- Family: Bythinellidae
- Genus: Bythinella
- Species: B. cylindrica

Binomial name
- Bythinella cylindrica (Frauenfeld, 1856)

Synonyms
- Bythinella (Bythinella) cylindrica (Frauenfeld, 1857) alternative representation; Paludina cylindrica Frauenfeld, 1857 (basionym)

= Bythinella cylindrica =

Species of gastropod

Bythinella cylindrica is a species of very small freshwater snail, an aquatic gastropod mollusk in the family Bythinellidae.

This species is endemic to Austria.
