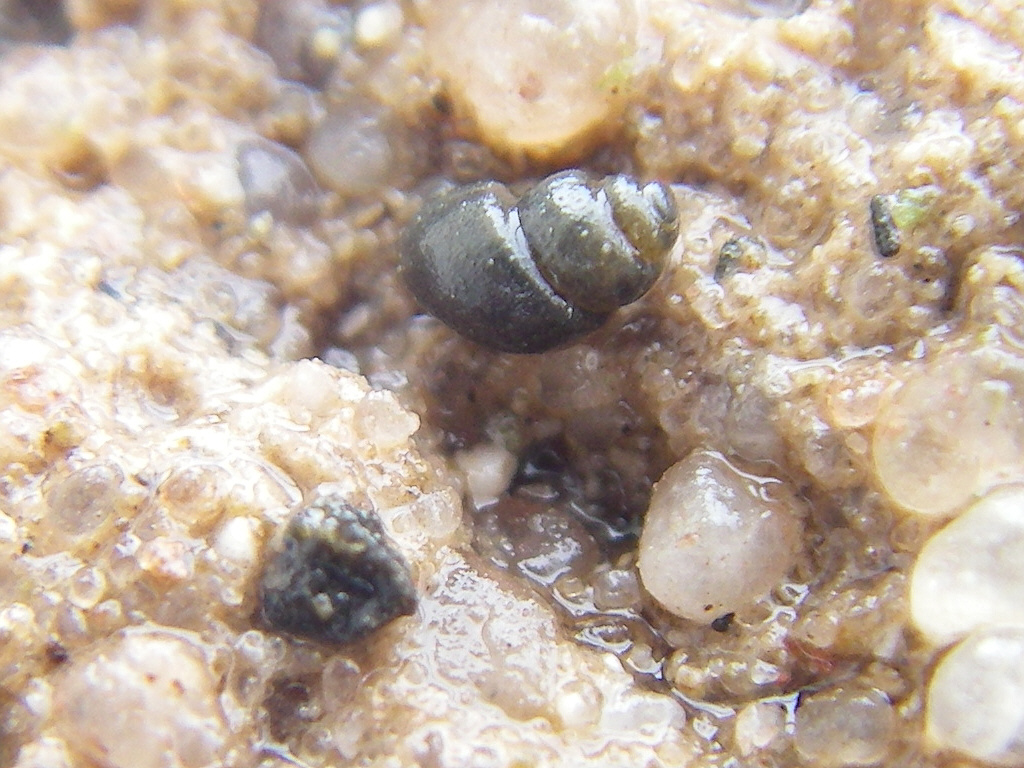
- An individual of the form compressa
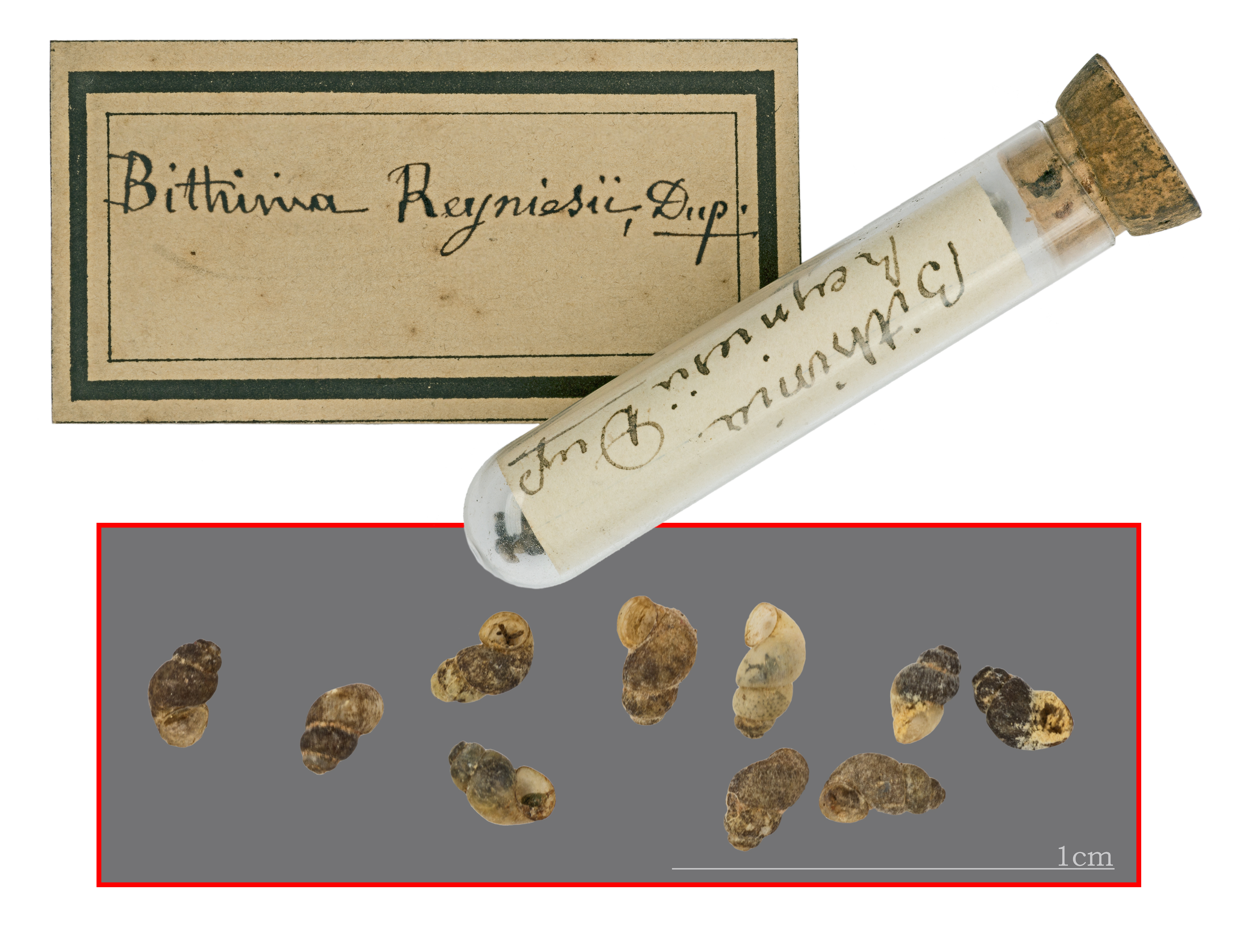
- Bythinella reyniesii Holotype MHNT

Conservation status
- Least Concern (IUCN 3.1)

Scientific classification
- Kingdom: Animalia
- Phylum: Mollusca
- Class: Gastropoda
- Subclass: Caenogastropoda
- Order: Littorinimorpha
- Family: Bythinellidae
- Genus: Bythinella
- Species: B. reyniesii

Binomial name
- Bythinella reyniesii (Dupuy, 1851)

Synonyms
- list of synonyms: Bythinella (Bythinella) badensis Boeters, 1981 alternative representation; Bythinella (Bythinella) compressa (Frauenfeld, 1857) alternative representation; Bythinella (Bythinella) parvula Locard, 1893 alternative representation; Bythinella (Bythinella) persuturata Bofill, F. Haas & Aguilar-Amat, 1921 alternative representation; Bythinella (Bythinella) reyniesii (Dupuy, 1851) alternative representation; Bythinella badensis Boeters, 1981 junior subjective synonym; Bythinella compressa (Frauenfeld, 1857); Bythinella compressa montisavium F. Haas, 1914 junior subjective synonym ( ); Bythinella gracilis Locard, 1893 ·; Bythinella parvula Locard, 1893; Bythinella persuturata Bofill, F. Haas & Aguilar-Amat, 1921 junior subjective synonym; Bythinella pouzi Locard, 1893; Bythinella rufescens (Küster, 1852) junior subjective synonym; Bythinella rufescens persuturata Bofill, F. Haas & Aguilar-Amat, 1921 superseded rank; Bythinella rufescens rufescens (Küster, 1852); Hydrobia reyniesii Dupuy, 1851; Paludina rufescens Küster, 1852 junior subjective synonym; Paludinella (Bythinella) reyniesii (Dupuy, 1851) superseded combination; Paludinella compressa Frauenfeld, 1857

= Bythinella reyniesii =

Species of gastropod

Bythinella reyniesii is a species of very small freshwater snail, an aquatic gastropod mollusk in the family Bythinellidae.

== Distribution ==
These snails live in springs. They were long believed to occur only in Andorra, Austria, and parts of France. This disjunct distribution was puzzling, until it was realized that the populations assigned to several other supposedly distinct species actually seem to all belong to one species. In fact, Bythinella reyniesii is probably widespread from western Germany and nearby Belgium through central and eastern France to Andorra.

== Description and genetics ==
These are small snails, with a nearly cylindrical shell measuring just over 2 mm in length. There is little morphological and almost no genetic variation between the supposed "species". Thus, even though the proposed synonymy resulted from mtDNA COI and nDNA ITS1 sequence data analyses applied to the phylogenetic species concept (which does not recognize subspecies), as opposed to the morphologically diverse Bythinella bicarinata it might not even be warranted to accept the formerly distinct taxa as subspecies.

== Conservation status ==
The northeastern specimens formerly separated in Bythinella compressa were classified as Vulnerable (B1+2c), as they were known from less than ten freshwater springs which are affected by pollution. Bythinella reyniesii, in the traditional sense was classified as a Species of Least Concern (meaning it is not considered globally threatened), and this assessment applies to the species in the expanded sense also.
