= Bythinella turca =

Conservation status
- Critically Endangered (IUCN 3.1)

Scientific classification
- Kingdom: Animalia
- Phylum: Mollusca
- Class: Gastropoda
- Subclass: Caenogastropoda
- Order: Littorinimorpha
- Family: Bythinellidae
- Genus: Bythinella
- Species: B. turca

Binomial name
- Bythinella turca (Radoman, 1976)

Synonyms
- Bythinella (Bythinella) turca Radoman, 1976 alternative representation

Species of gastropod

Bythinella turca is a species of very small freshwater snail, an aquatic gastropod mollusc in the family Bythinellidae.

The species is endemic to Turkey, and is currently Critically endangered due to the clearing and "improvement" of the spring in which it lives for human recreational purposes.
