= Bythinella padiraci =

Conservation status
- Vulnerable (IUCN 3.1)

Scientific classification
- Kingdom: Animalia
- Phylum: Mollusca
- Class: Gastropoda
- Subclass: Caenogastropoda
- Order: Littorinimorpha
- Family: Bythinellidae
- Genus: Bythinella
- Species: B. padiraci

Binomial name
- Bythinella padiraci Locard, 1903

Synonyms
- Bythinella (Bythinella) padiraci Locard, 1903 alternative representation; Bythinella (Thibynella) padiraci Locard, 1903 superseded combination

Species of gastropod

Bythinella padiraci is a species of very small freshwater snail, an aquatic gastropod mollusk in the family Bythinellidae.

This snail is endemic to France, from a very little place named "Gouffre de Padirac" (Padirac give his name to the snail).
