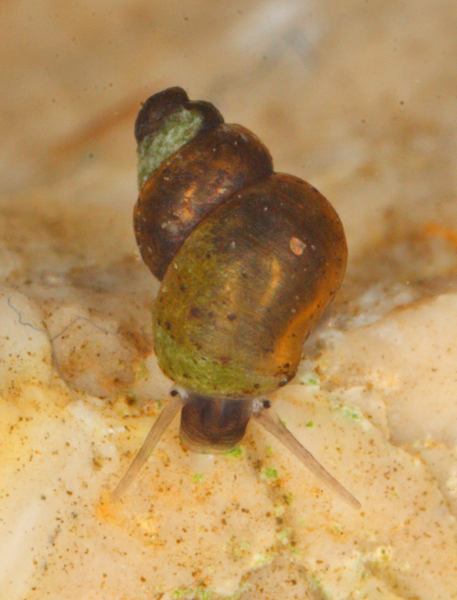
- a live Bythinella pannonica

Conservation status
- Least Concern (IUCN 3.1)

Scientific classification
- Kingdom: Animalia
- Phylum: Mollusca
- Class: Gastropoda
- Subclass: Caenogastropoda
- Order: Littorinimorpha
- Family: Bythinellidae
- Genus: Bythinella
- Species: B. pannonica

Binomial name
- Bythinella pannonica (von Frauenfeld, 1865)

Synonyms
- Bythinella (Bythinella) pannonica (Frauenfeld, 1865) alternative representation; Lithoglyphus pannonicus Frauenfeld, 1865 (basionym); Paludinella (Pseudamnicola) pannonica (Frauenfeld, 1865) superseded combination; Sadleriana pannonica (von Frauenfeld, 1865)

= Bythinella pannonica =

Species of gastropod

Bythinella pannonica is a species of small freshwater snail with an operculum, an aquatic gastropod mollusk in the family Bythinellidae.

This species is also known as Sadleriana pannonica.

== Distribution ==
The distribution of this species is Western Carpathian.

It is found in Hungary and Slovakia.
