= Bythinella gloeeri =

Conservation status
- Critically Endangered (IUCN 3.1)

Scientific classification
- Kingdom: Animalia
- Phylum: Mollusca
- Class: Gastropoda
- Subclass: Caenogastropoda
- Order: Littorinimorpha
- Family: Bythinellidae
- Genus: Bythinella
- Species: B. gloeeri

Binomial name
- Bythinella gloeeri (Georgiev, 2009)

Species of gastropod

Bythinella gloeeri is a species of very small freshwater snail, an aquatic gastropod mollusk in the family Bythinellidae.

== Distribution ==
This species is endemic to Bulgaria, and is known only from a river in Lepenitsa Cave, in the Western Rhodopes mountain range.
