= Bythinella vesontiana =

Conservation status
- Data Deficient (IUCN 3.1)

Scientific classification
- Kingdom: Animalia
- Phylum: Mollusca
- Class: Gastropoda
- Subclass: Caenogastropoda
- Order: Littorinimorpha
- Family: Bythinellidae
- Genus: Bythinella
- Species: B. vesontiana

Binomial name
- Bythinella vesontiana Bernasconi, 1989

Synonyms
- Bythinella (Bythinella) vesontiana R. Bernasconi, 1989 alternative representation

Species of gastropod

Bythinella vesontiana is a species of very small freshwater snail, an aquatic gastropod mollusk in the family Bythinellidae.

This species is endemic to France.
