= Bythinella viridis =

Conservation status
- Endangered (IUCN 3.1)

Scientific classification
- Kingdom: Animalia
- Phylum: Mollusca
- Class: Gastropoda
- Subclass: Caenogastropoda
- Order: Littorinimorpha
- Family: Bythinellidae
- Genus: Bythinella
- Species: B. viridis

Binomial name
- Bythinella viridis (Poiret, 1801)

Synonyms
- Bulimus viridis Poiret, 1801; Bythinella (Bythinella) lancelevei Locard, 1884; Bythinella (Bythinella) viridis (Poiret, 1801); Bythinella (Pyrgobythinella) carinulata (Drouët, 1867); Bythinella burgundina Locard, 1893; Bythinella carinulata (Drouët, 1867); Bythinella lancelevei Locard, 1884; Bythinella viridiformis R. Bernasconi, 1989; Hydrobia carinulata Drouët, 1867; Paludinella (Bythinella) carinulata Drouët, 1867; Paludinella (Bythinella) lancelevei (Locard, 1884); Paludinella (Bythinella) viridis (Poiret, 1801); Paludinella scalarina Paladilhe, 1876; Paludinella turgidula Paladilhe, 1869

Species of gastropod

Bythinella viridis is a species of very small freshwater snail, an aquatic gastropod mollusc in the family Bythinellidae.

It is an endangered species endemic to France.
