= Bythinella bouloti =

Scientific classification
- Kingdom: Animalia
- Phylum: Mollusca
- Class: Gastropoda
- Subclass: Caenogastropoda
- Order: Littorinimorpha
- Family: Bythinellidae
- Genus: Bythinella
- Species: B. bouloti

Binomial name
- Bythinella bouloti Girardi, Bichain & Wienin, 2002

Synonyms
- Bythinella (Bythinella) bouloti H. Girardi, Bichain & Wienin, 2002 alternative representation; Bythinella (Thibynella) bouloti H. Girardi, Bichain & Wienin, 2002 superseded combination; Bythinella (Thibynella) galerae H. Girardi, Bichain & Wienin, 2002; Bythinella galerae H. Girardi, Bichain & Wienin, 2002 junior subjective synonym

Species of gastropod

Bythinella bouloti is a species of very small freshwater snail, an aquatic gastropod mollusk in the family Bythinellidae.

As of 2002, no living animals had been found. Empty shells were used as the basis for the species description.

== Distribution ==
Bythinella bouloti (France)

This species is endemic to France. The type locality is a cave in Castelbouc, Sainte-Enimie, Lozère.

== Ecology ==
Bythinella bouloti is probably a troglobite.
