= Bythinella pupoides =

Conservation status
- Least Concern (IUCN 3.1)

Scientific classification
- Kingdom: Animalia
- Phylum: Mollusca
- Class: Gastropoda
- Subclass: Caenogastropoda
- Order: Littorinimorpha
- Family: Bythinellidae
- Genus: Bythinella
- Species: B. pupoides

Binomial name
- Bythinella pupoides (Paladilhe, 1869)

Synonyms
- Bythinella (Bythinella) pupoides (Paladilhe, 1869) · alternative representation; Bythinella (Lemanica) brotiana Clessin, 1890 junior subjective synonym; Paludinella (Bythinella) pupoides (Paladilhe, 1869) superseded combination; † Paludinella pupoides Paladilhe, 1869 superseded combination

Species of gastropod

Bythinella pupoides is a species of very small freshwater snail, an aquatic gastropod mollusk in the family Bythinellidae.

Subspecies

- Bythinella pupoides phreaticola R. Bernasconi, 1989
- Bythinella pupoides pupoides (Paladilhe, 1869)
- Bythinella pupoides jurana Locard, 1893: synonym of Avenionia brevis (Draparnaud, 1805) (a junior synonym)

This snail is found in France and Switzerland.
