= Samerberg =

- Municipality
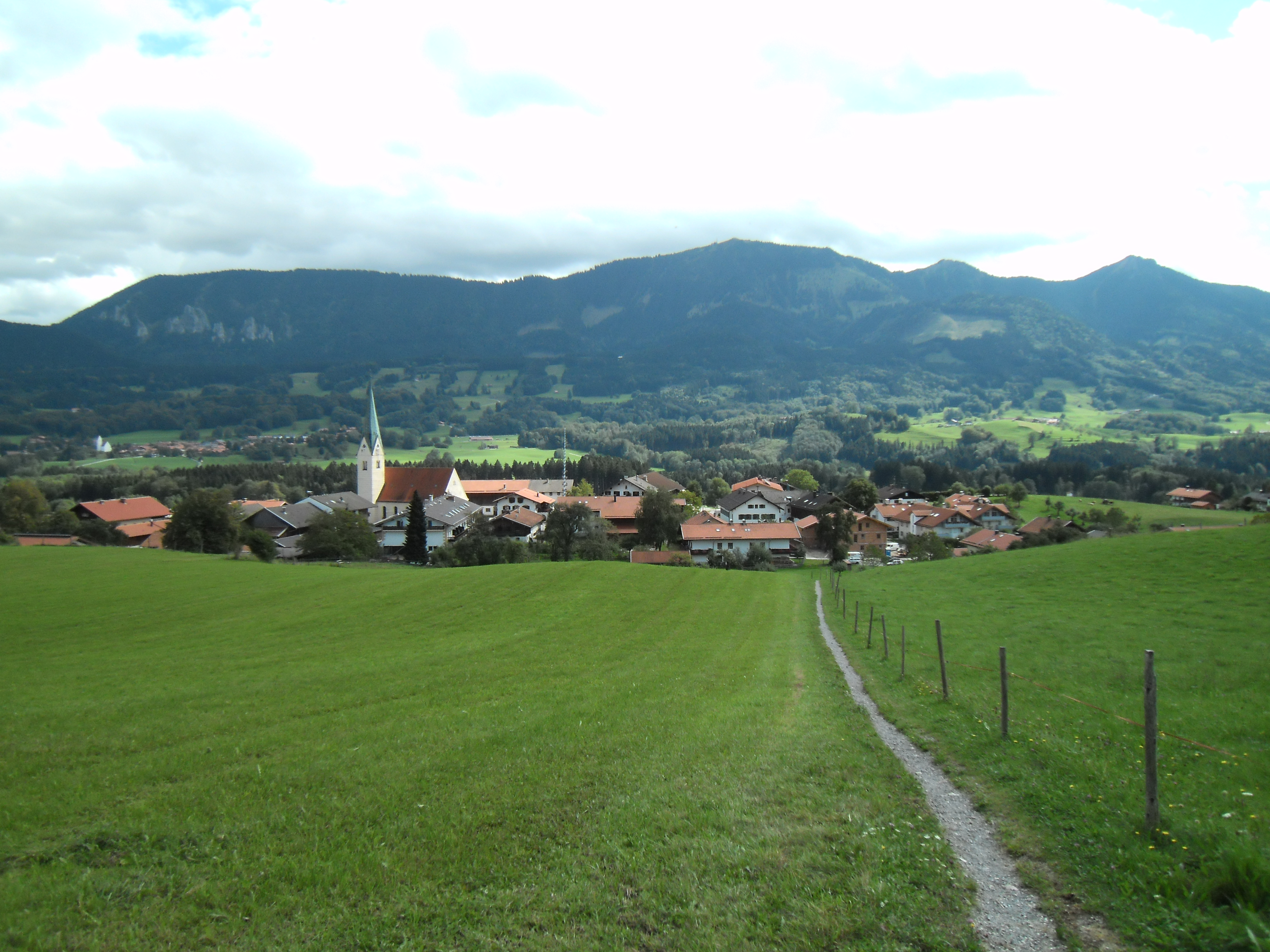
- General view of Törwang. Hochries seen in the background.

- Coat of arms

- Location of Samerberg within Rosenheim district
- Interactive map of Samerberg
- Location within Germany Location within Bavaria
- Coordinates: 47°47′N 12°13′E
- Country: Germany
- State: Bavaria
- Admin. region: Oberbayern
- District: Rosenheim

Government
  - Mayor (2020–26): Georg Huber

Area
  - Total: 33.4 km^{2} (12.9 sq mi)
- Elevation: 700 m (2,300 ft)

Population (2025-12-31)
  - Total: 2,823
  - Density: 84.5/km^{2} (219/sq mi)
- Time zone: UTC+01:00 (CET)
  - Summer (DST): UTC+02:00 (CEST)
- Postal codes: 83122
- Dialling codes: 08032
- Vehicle registration: RO
- Website: www.samerberg.de

Samerberg (German pronunciation: [ˈzaːmɐbɛʁk]) is a municipality in the district of Rosenheim in Bavaria in Germany.

It consists of 78 hamlets and localities, none of them bearing the name Samerberg itself, the seat is in Törwang.
