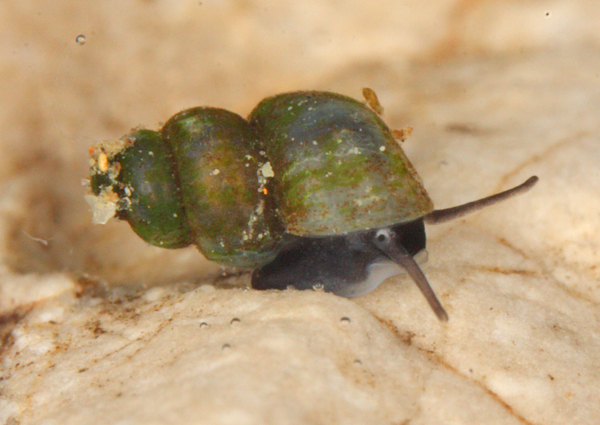
- Bythinella bavarica

Conservation status
- Endangered (IUCN 3.1)

Scientific classification
- Kingdom: Animalia
- Phylum: Mollusca
- Class: Gastropoda
- Subclass: Caenogastropoda
- Order: Littorinimorpha
- Family: Bythinellidae
- Genus: Bythinella
- Species: B. bavarica

Binomial name
- Bythinella bavarica Clessin, 1877

Synonyms
- Bythinella (Bythinella) bavarica Clessin, 1877 alternative representation; Bythinella alta Clessin, 1890 junior subjective synonym; Bythinella schmidtii var. bavarica Clessin, 1877

= Bythinella bavarica =

Species of gastropod

Bythinella bavarica is a species of very small freshwater snail, an aquatic gastropod mollusk in the family Bythinellidae.

This species is endemic to Germany.
