= Klausenberg (Chiemgau Alps) =

Coordinates: 47°44′19″N 12°15′59″E

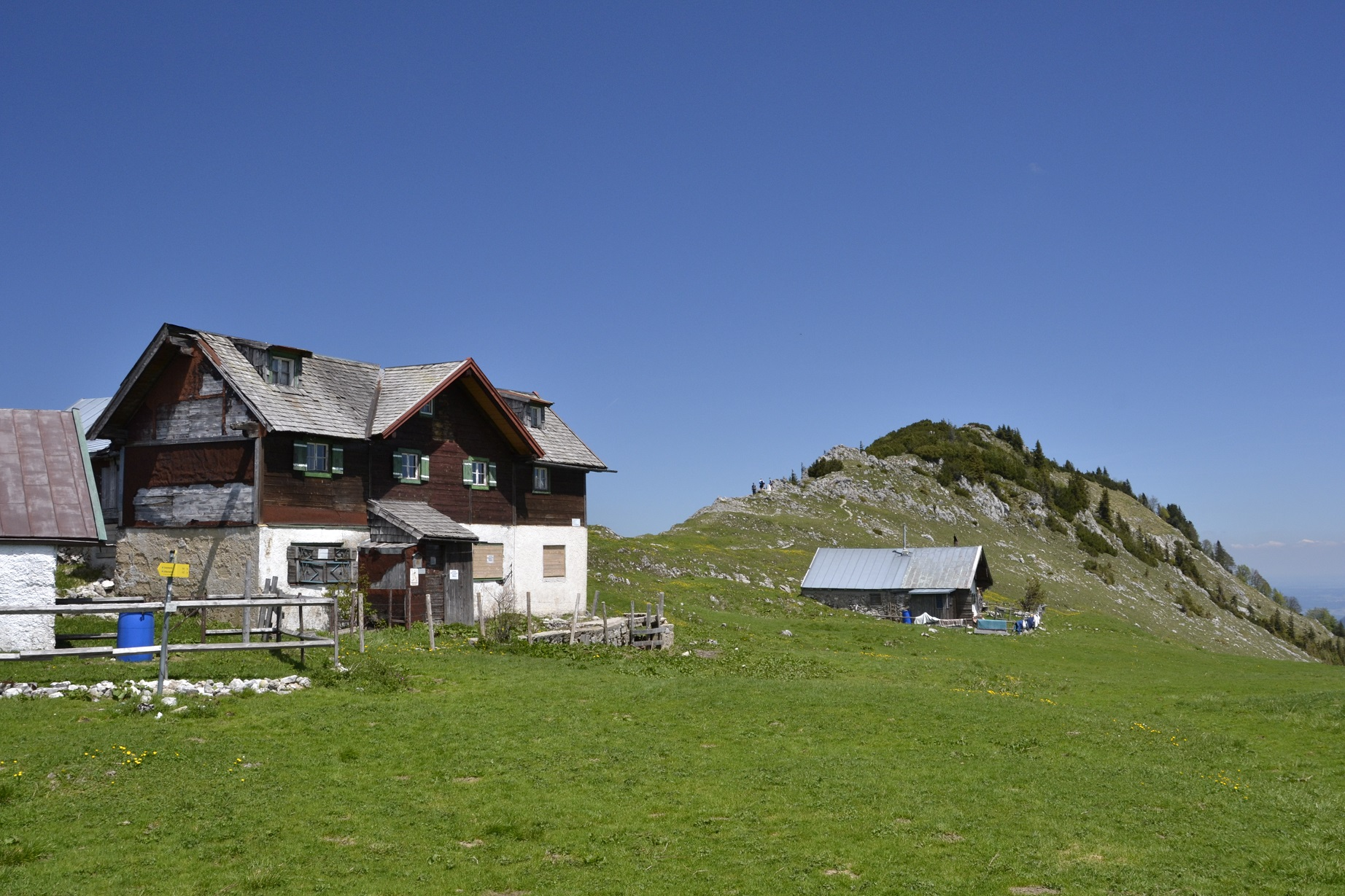
- The Klausenhütte (left) and the Klausenberg (right)

Highest point
- Elevation: 1,548 m (5,079 ft)

Geography
- Location: Bavaria, Germany

Klausenberg is a mountain of the Chiemgau Alps in Bavaria, Germany.
