= Sonntagshorn =

Mountain in the Chiemgau Alps at the border Salzburg / Bavaria

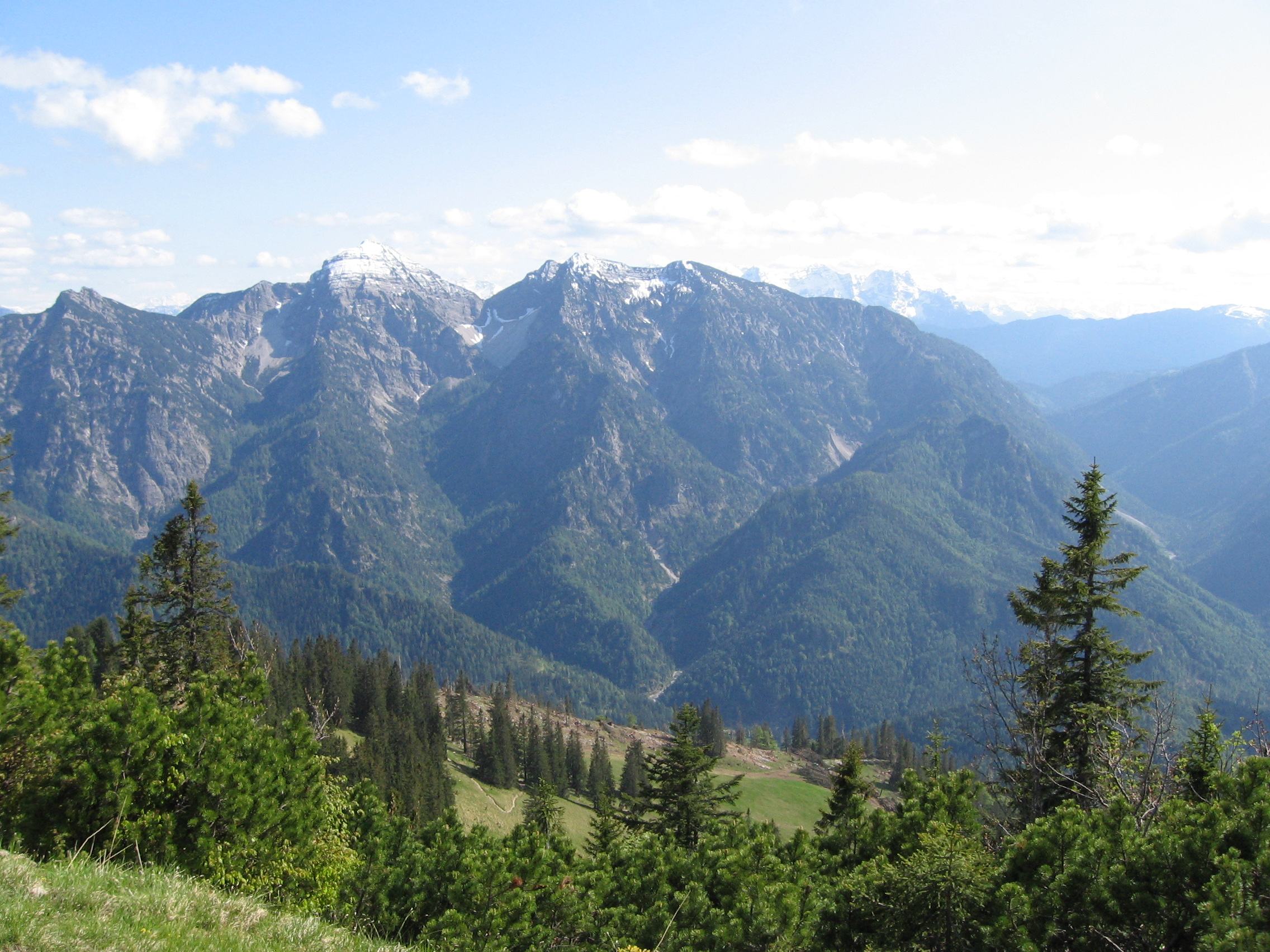
- The Sonntagshorn from the north

Highest point
- Elevation: 1,961 m (6,434 ft)
- Prominence: 1,181 m (3,875 ft)
- Listing: highest mountain in the Chiemgau Alps
- Coordinates: 47°40′56″N 12°41′45″E

Geography
- Location within Alps
- Location: Bavaria, Germany; Salzburg, Austria
- Parent range: Chiemgau Alps

Climbing
- Normal route: Melleck, Steinbachgraben, Hochalmen, Sonntagshorn

The Sonntagshorn, at 1,961 metres above sea level, is the highest mountain in the Chiemgau Alps.

The international border between Germany and Austria, and hence between the states of Bavaria and Salzburg, runs over the summit of the mountain, which rises south-southeast of Ruhpolding and south-southwest of Inzell.

The name Sonntagshorn has nothing to do with the Sonntag (German for "Sunday"), but is derived from Sonnendach, which means "sun roof". The summit structure looks like a roof from the southern side which, as a result of its relatively gentle slope, is very strongly irradiated by the sun.

Because the mountain has no cable cars it is a worthwhile destination which, in winter, is especially popular with ski tourists in the Bavarian Alps. A comparatively easy climb approaches from the south via the Austrian valley of Heutal. The northern climb from the German side is more challenging, but also more spectacular and runs through unpopulated natural countryside, initially along a relatively easy forest track, but then over steep fields of scree and, into the high summer, also over fields of old snow. The climb via the middle Kraxenbach requires some climbing (grade II) and has the danger of falling rocks. The normal route runs from Melleck and through the Steinbachgraben to the Hochalmen and finally to the summit.

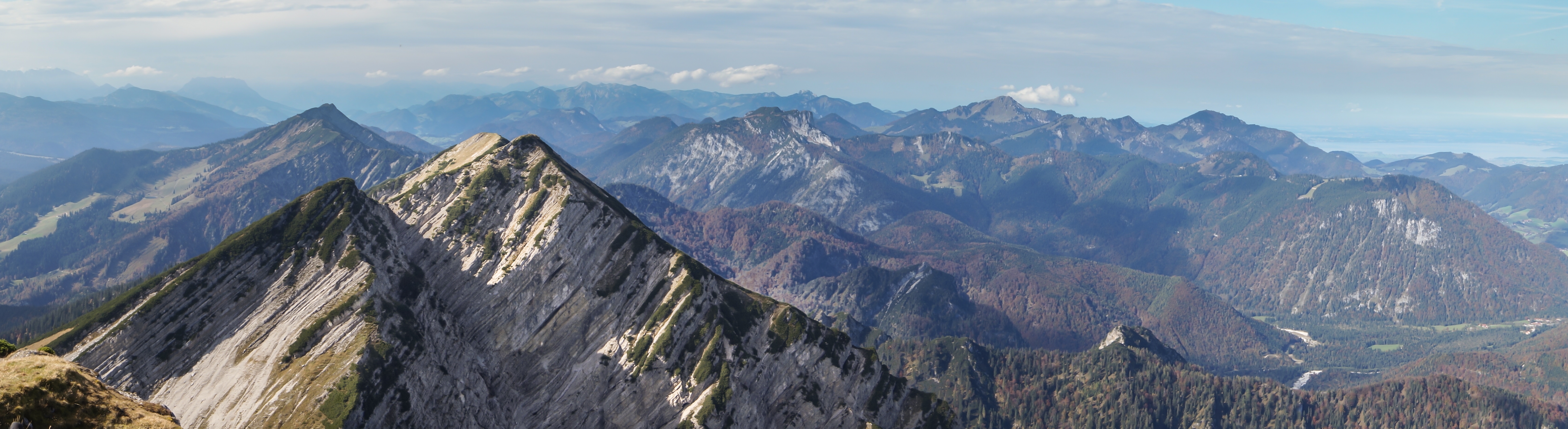
Panoramic view from the Sonntagshorn summit facing west. The peak Vorderlahner Kopf is prominent in the foreground.
