= Steinplatte =

Mountain in Tyrol and Salzburg, Austria

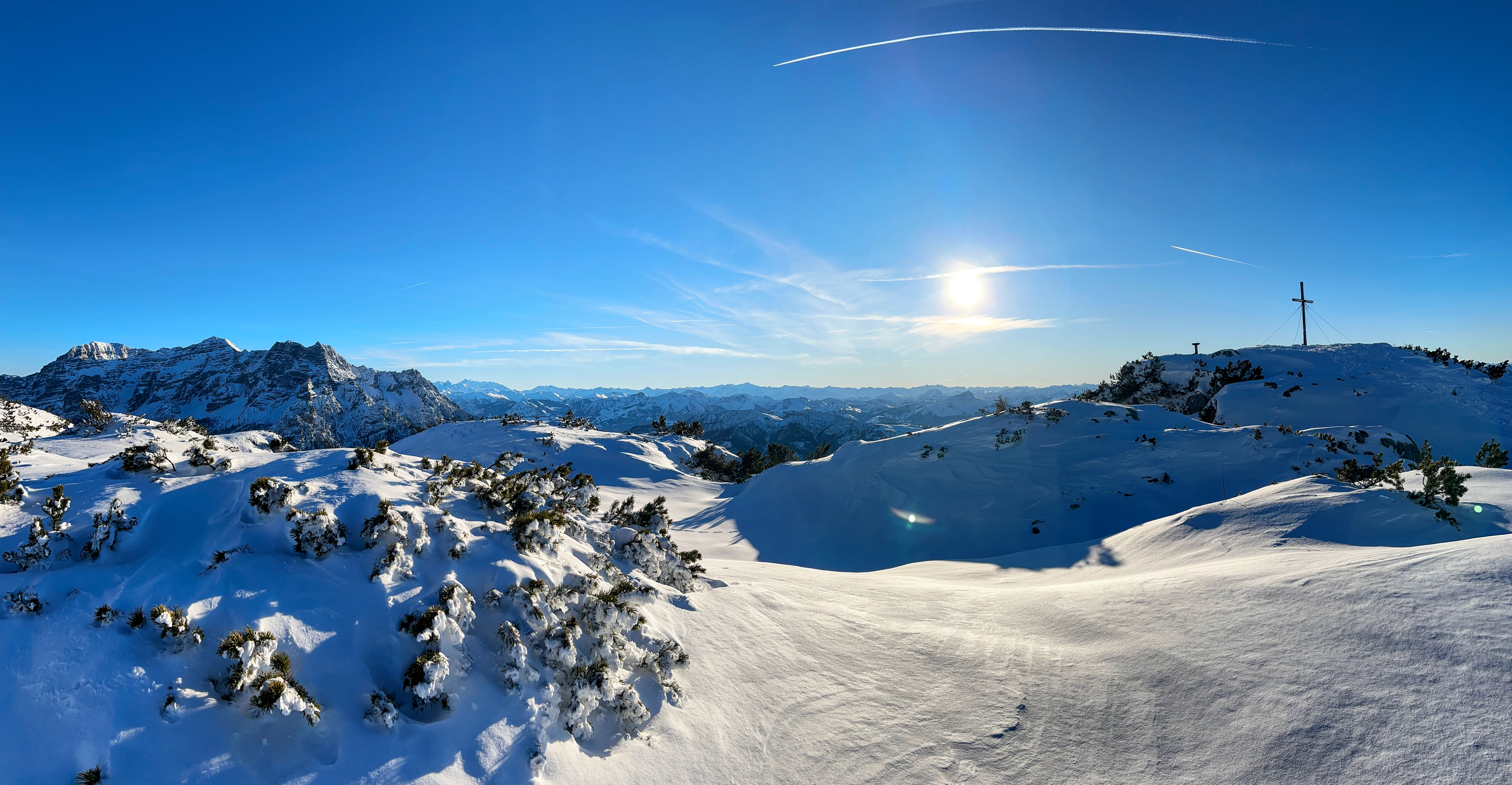
- Steinplatte, western summit

Highest point
- Elevation: 1,869 m (6,132 ft)
- Prominence: 873 m (2,864 ft)
- Parent peak: Elferhörndl
- Coordinates: 47°36′15″N 12°34′48″E

Geography
- Location within Austria
- Location: Tyrol, Salzburg, Austria
- Parent range: Alps, Chiemgau Alps

Climbing
- Easiest route: hike

Steinplatte is a major summit of the Chiemgau Alps range. It belongs to the Austrian states of Tyrol and Salzburg.

The Steinplatte is part of the homonymous alpine skiing area, a cable car runs close to the summit. It is also popular for hiking in summer.
