= Bythinella bicarinata =

Conservation status
- Least Concern (IUCN 3.1)

Scientific classification
- Kingdom: Animalia
- Phylum: Mollusca
- Class: Gastropoda
- Subclass: Caenogastropoda
- Order: Littorinimorpha
- Family: Bythinellidae
- Genus: Bythinella
- Species: B. bicarinata

Binomial name
- Bythinella bicarinata (des Moulins, 1827)

Synonyms
- Bithynia moulinsii Dupuy, 1849; Bithinia moulinsii Dupuy, 1849 (lapsus); Bythinella (Brachypyrgula) bicarinata (Des Moulins, 1827) superseded combination; Bythinella (Bythinella) bicarinata (Des Moulins, 1827) alternative representation; Bythinella (Bythinella) dunkeri (Frauenfeld, 1857) alternative representation; Bythinella (Bythinella) pujolensis R. Bernasconi, 2000 alternative representation; Bythinella dunkeri (Frauenfeld, 1857); Bythinella lalindei Bernasconi, 2000; Bythinella poujolensis Bernasconi, 2000; Paludina bicarinata Des Moulins, 1827 (original combination); Paludinella (Bythinella) bicarinata (Des Moulins, 1827) superseded combination; Paludinella dunkeri Frauenfeld, 1857

Species of gastropod

Bythinella bicarinata is a species of very small freshwater snail, an aquatic gastropod mollusk in the family Bythinellidae.

== Shell description ==
The shell of this species measures about 2.2–2.6 mm long and has a pupoidal shape (shaped like a fly's puparium). In the population first described, there are two ribs running along the length of the shell; hence the scientific name bicarinata ("two-keeled").

== Distribution ==
This species was believed to be endemic to France and severely threatened with extinction. In 1996 it was classified as Critically Endangered (A1ce) by the IUCN, as its habitat – essentially the Fontaine de la Vierge and nearby springs in the Dordogne – was being affected by pollution and the local snail populations had declined more than 80% in the late 20th century.

== Genetics ==
However, analysis of mtDNA COI and nDNA ITS1 sequence data showed that the "typical" two-keeled Bythinella bicarinata are actually part of a clade widespread in central to northeastern France and nearby regions. Consequently, Bythinella dunkeri, Bythinella lalindei, Bythinella moulinsii and Bythinella poujolensis are now provisionally treated as junior synonyms of Bythinella bicarinata. These all lack the shell keels, though Bythinella lalindei and Bythinella poujolensis are otherwise essentially identical. The other two differ a bit more, though those described as Bythinella moulinsii are quite variable in size and shape. As the study proposing the synonymy applied the phylogenetic species concept which does not recognize subspecies, the question whether the other taxa are valid subspecies or simply local morphs remains unresolved.

Considering the lack of the two-keeled phenotype outside the extreme southeastern end of the range of Bythinella bicarinata and the fact that the region where it occurs is at the very limits of the range, it is probably advisable to recognize several subspecies. In any case, Bythinella bicarinata in the loose sense is not globally threatened. The populations from Belgium and western Germany described as Bythinella dunkeri were in 1996 classified as Vulnerable (B1+2c), as they were known from less than ten freshwater springs which are affected by pollution. Given that they occur at the other end of the species' range and are consistently most distinct morphologically from the "keeled" specimens, they might also warrant recognition as subspecies.
