= Ristfeuchthorn =

Mountain in Bavaria, Germany

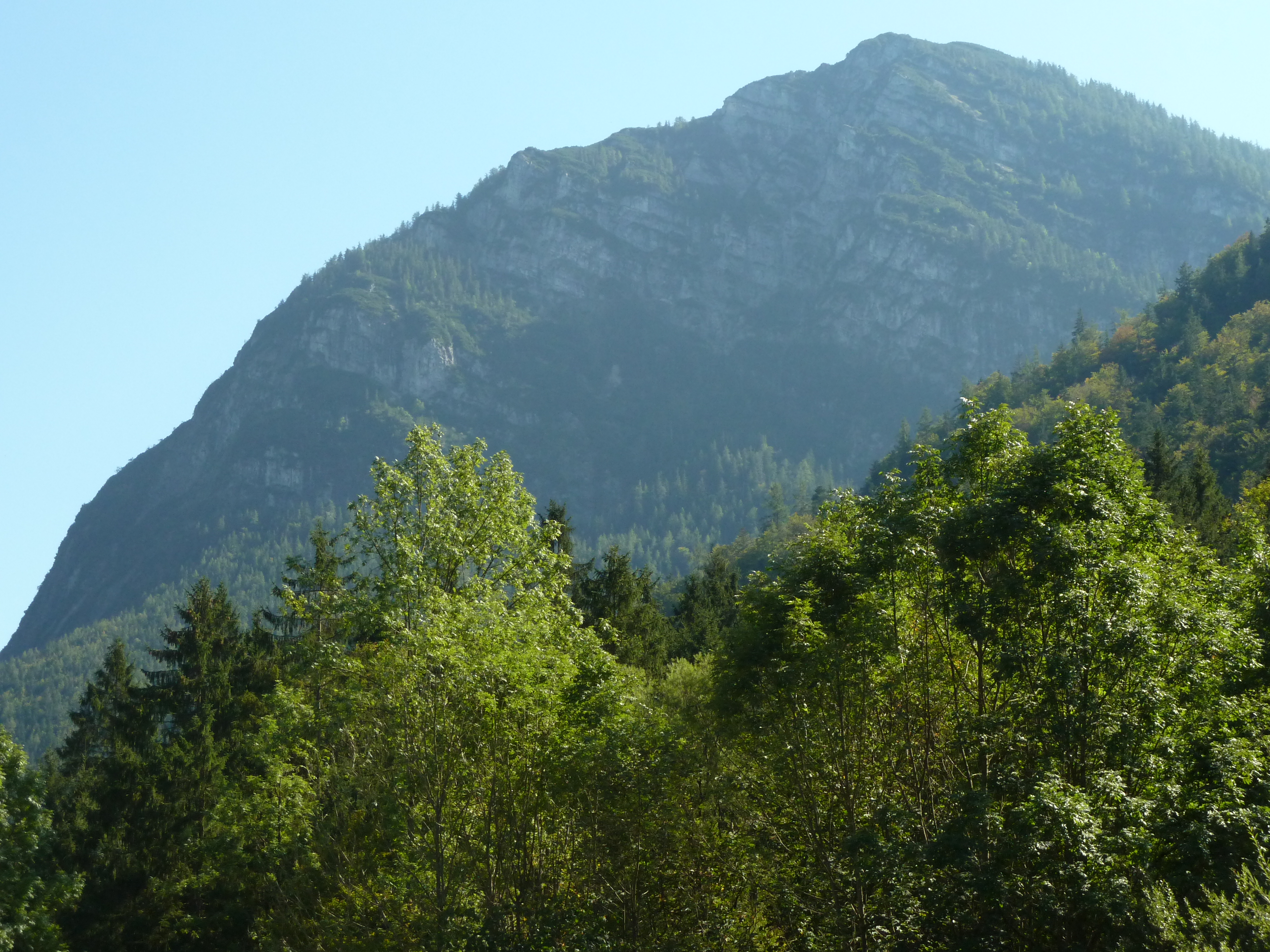

Highest point
- Elevation: 1,569 m (5,148 ft)
- Coordinates: 47°42′N 12°47′E

Geography
- Location: Bavaria, Germany
- Parent range: Chiemgau Alps

Ristfeuchthorn is a mountain of Bavaria, Germany.

It is a very well-developed summit, which is accessible from different sides. Nearby is the white Schneizlreuth gorge. In the spring after the snow melt are many waterfalls.
