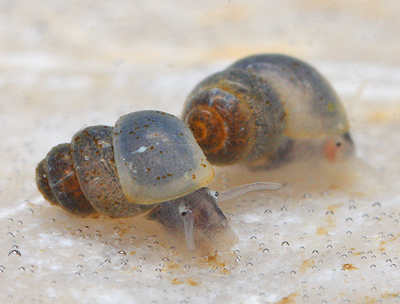
- Two live specimens of Bythinella austriaca

Conservation status
- Least Concern (IUCN 3.1)

Scientific classification
- Kingdom: Animalia
- Phylum: Mollusca
- Class: Gastropoda
- Subclass: Caenogastropoda
- Order: Littorinimorpha
- Family: Bythinellidae
- Genus: Bythinella
- Species: B. austriaca

Binomial name
- Bythinella austriaca (von Frauenfeld, 1857)

Synonyms
- Bythinella (Bythinella) austriaca (Frauenfeld, 1857) alternative representation; Bythinella intermedia Mahler, 1950; Microna saxatilis intermedia (Mahler, 1950); Paludinella (Bythinella) austriaca Frauenfeld, 1857 superseded combination; Paludinella austriaca Frauenfeld, 1857 (original combination); Paludinella lata Frauenfeld, 1863 ·

= Bythinella austriaca =

Species of gastropod

Bythinella austriaca is a species of very small freshwater snail with an operculum, an aquatic gastropod mollusk in the family Bythinellidae.

Subspecies

- Bythinella austriaca austriaca (Frauenfeld, 1857)
- Bythinella austriaca clessini Rzehac, 1888
- Bythinella austriaca melanostoma Brancsik, 1889
- Bythinella austriaca pavovillatica Canon, 1937
- Bythinella austriaca ehrmanni Pax, 1938: synonym of Bythinella ehrmanni Pax, 1938

== Distribution ==
The distribution of this species is Carpathian (eastern alpine and Carpathian).

This species occurs in:

- Austria (type locality in Vienna)
- Bulgaria
- Czech Republic – it lives mainly in Moravia and in eastern Bohemia, but there are also isolated populations near Prague
- Germany – lives only in Bayern and is endangered (Gefährdet)
- Poland
- Slovakia

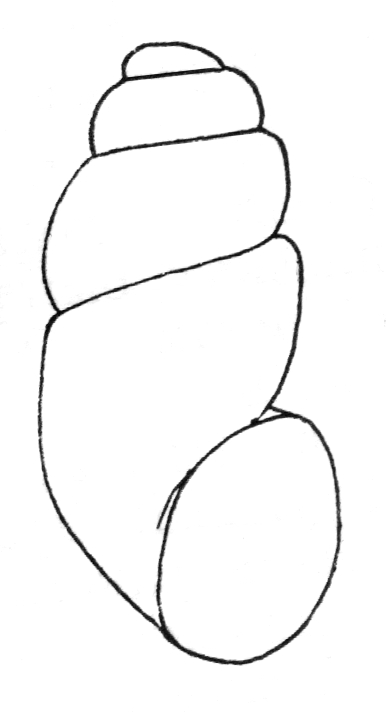
Drawing of the apertural view of the shell of Bythinella austriaca

== Habitat ==
Bythinella austriaca lives in springs and in brooks near springs.
