= Lepenitsa Cave =

Cave in Bulgaria

Lepenitsa
- Лепеница
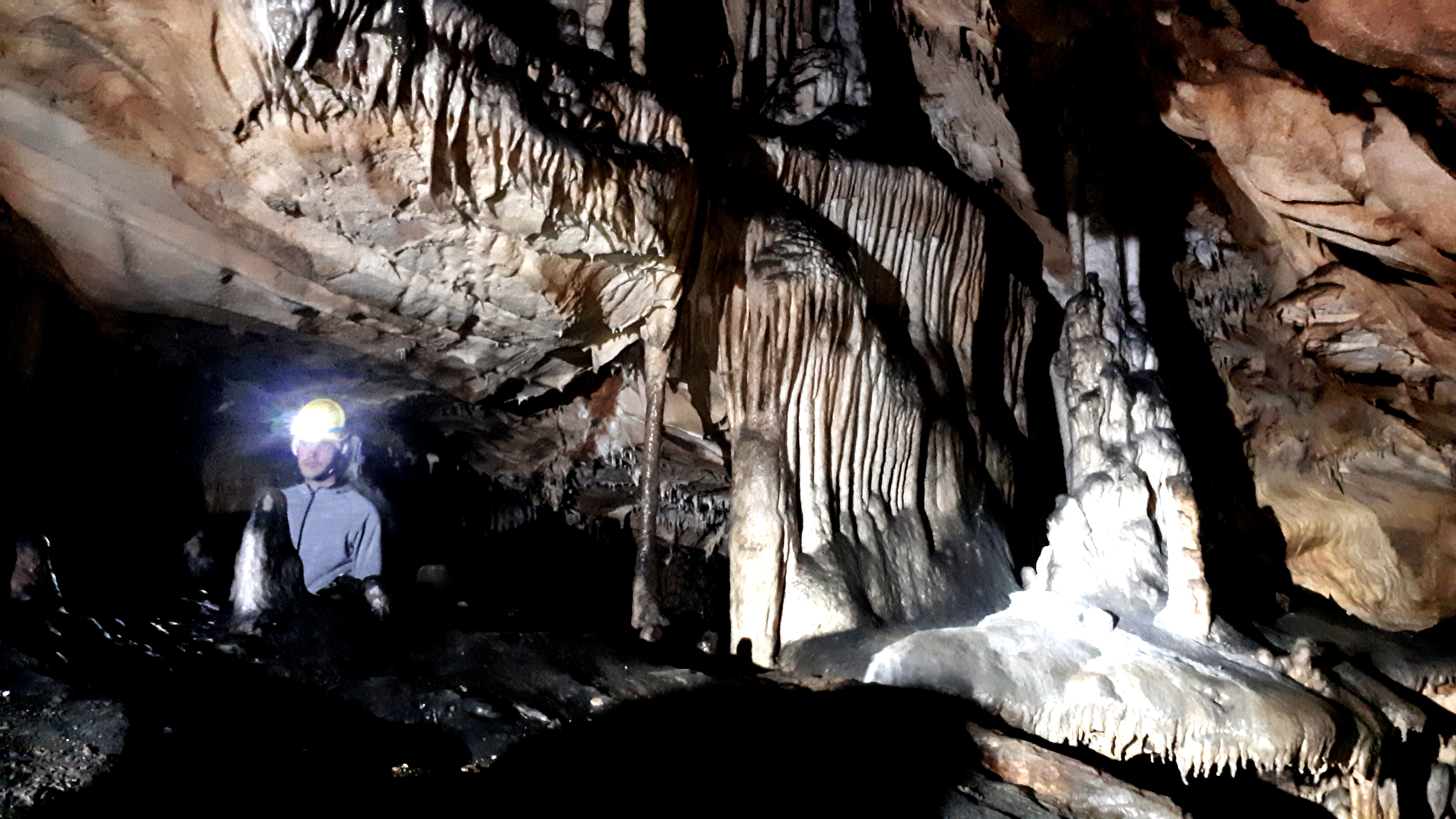

- Location within Bulgaria
- Location: Rhodope Mountains, Bulgaria
- Coordinates: 41°57′18.1″N 24°0′36.2″E
- Length: 1525 m
- Elevation: 975 m
- Discovery: 1925

Lepenitsa (Bulgarian: Лепеница) is a cave in the Rhodope Mountains, southern Bulgaria. Lepenitsa is among the 100 Tourist Sites of Bulgaria of the Bulgarian Tourist Union. It was declared a natural landmark in 1962.

== Location and access ==
Lepenitsa is situated at an altitude of 975 m at the foothills of the summit of Syutkya (2,186 m) in the Batak Mountain of the western Rhodope Mountains. Its entrance is on the left slope of the valley of the river Chukura, a tributary of the Chepinska reka. The closest settlements are the towns of Rakitovo and Velingrad, both in Pazardzhik Province. From Rakitovo an 11 km asphalt road leads to the Removo locality, from where there is a 1 km foot trail and a 6 km asphalt and gravel road to the cave entrance. From Velingrad there is a 10 km asphalt road, followed by another 2 km gravel road to the cave.

== Discovery and research ==
The first expeditions to Lepenitsa date to 1925–1927, when it was explored by the Bulgarian zoologist Ivan Buresh, director of the then Royal Museum of Natural History in Sofia. In 1930 citizens of Rakitovo established the first branch of the Bulgarian Speleological Society outside Sofia in order to explore Lepenitsa and the surrounding caves. About 400 m of the cave were researched and mapped in 1931. Mapping was completed in 1973.

== Description ==
The total length of the cave is 1,525 m on three levels. Its area is 52,000 m^{2}. The river Lepenitsa flows through the lower level. The middle level is dry, with many cave formations, including stalactites, stalagmites and draperies, as well as two permanent and two temporary sinter lakes. The upper level is dry. There is a constant temperature of 10 °C.

The cave was shortly open to visitors in 1931 but was never converted to a show cave. In 2010 the middle level was reopened for organised groups of up to 10 people with equipment and a guide.

== Fauna ==
Lepenitsa has a rich fauna with 24 registered species, including three endemic to the cave: Duvalius bureschi, Troglohyfantes drenskii and Anamastigona lepenicae. Other rare species include Lithobius stygius and Plusiocampa bulgarica. In 2010 a fourth endemic species restricted to Lepenitsa was discovered, the freshwater snail Bythinella gloeeri, raising the number of species in the cave to 25.

Lepenitsa is inhabited by seven bat species: greater horseshoe bat (Rhinolophus ferrumequinum), lesser horseshoe bat (Rhinolophus hipposideros), Geoffroy's bat (Myotis emarginatus), greater mouse-eared bat (Myotis myotis), lesser mouse-eared bat (Myotis blythii), western barbastelle (Barbastella barbastellus) and grey long-eared bat (Plecotus austriacus).
