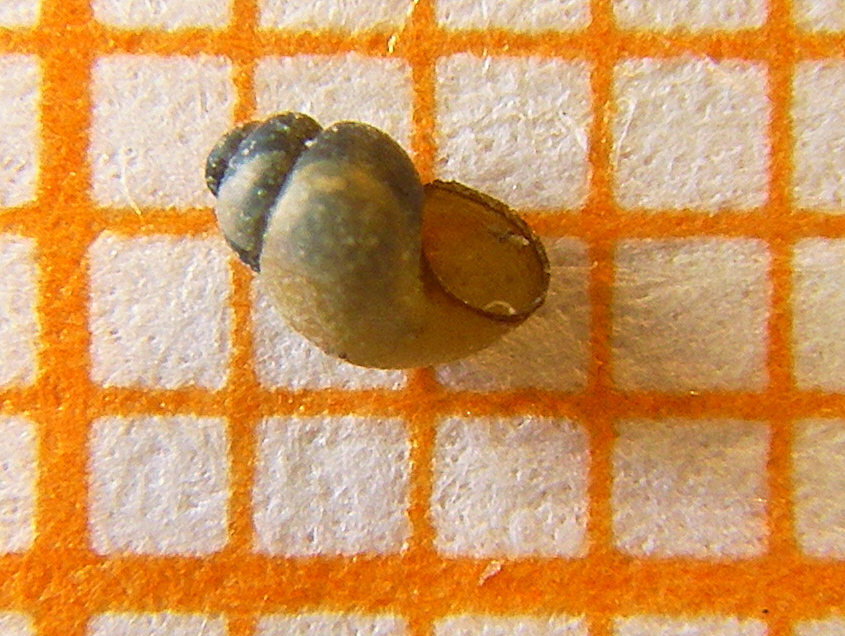
- Shell of compressa-type Bythinella reyniesii on 1 millimetre grid paper

Scientific classification
- Kingdom: Animalia
- Phylum: Mollusca
- Class: Gastropoda
- Subclass: Caenogastropoda
- Order: Littorinimorpha
- Superfamily: Truncatelloidea
- Family: Bythinellidae
- Genus: Bythinella; Moquin-Tandon, 1856

Type species
- Bulimus viridis Poiret, 1801

Synonyms
- Bithinella [sic] (misspelling)

= Bythinella =

Genus of gastropods

Bythinella is a genus of very small freshwater snails, an aquatic gastropod mollusk in the family Bythinellidae (according to the taxonomy of the Gastropoda by Bouchet & Rocroi, 2005).

These gonochoristic snails are small animals, with a shell length of about 2–4 mm. Amnicola is a close relative, containing North American snails with essentially similar appearance and ecology. The scientific name means "small Bithynia"; the latter snail genus is somewhat similar at a casual glance (though much larger) but not at all closely related among the Rissooidea.

== Distribution ==
The present genus occurs in springs, and sometimes caves or groundwater, from Catalonia across central Europe to the Aegean Region of Turkey. In and around France a particularly high diversity of these snails is found. Due to the limited range and special and easily destroyed habitat, these snails are liable to become endangered species.

== Species ==
More than 80 species and subspecies are recognized at present. However, it is not at all clear that all of those recognized as good species are actually that distinct, and some in fact seem to be local morphs instead of valid taxa. Some undescribed species are also known to exist.

- Bythinella abbreviata Michaud, 1831
- Bythinella alexpeteri Glöer & Hirschfelder, 2020
- †Bythinella alta Deshayes, 1862
- Bythinella amira Glöer & Hirschfelder, 2020
- Bythinella anatolica Yıldırım, Kebapçı & Bahadır Koca, 2015
- Bythinella andorrensis Paladilhe, 1875
- Bythinella aneliae Georgiev & Stoycheva, 2011
- Bythinella angelitae Haase, Wilke & Mildner, 2007
- Bythinella angelovi Glöer & Georgiev, 2011
- Bythinella angusta Clessin, 1911
- Bythinella anianensis Paladilhe, 1870 - accepted as: B. cebennensis
- † Bythinella antiguensis A. P. Brown & Pilsbry, 1914
- † Bythinella archaea Bourguignat, 1869
- † Bythinella atomus Brongniart, 1810
- Bythinella atypikos A. Reischütz, P. L. Reischütz & W. Fischer, 2008
- † Bythinella auriculata Szőts, 1953
- Bythinella austriaca Frauenfeld, 1856
- Bythinella badensis Boeters, 1981: accepted as Bythinella reyniesii
- Bythinella baidashnikovi Sitnikova, Starobogatov & V. Anistratenko, 1992
- Bythinella batalleri Bofill, 1925
- Bythinella baudoni (Paladilhe, 1874)
- Bythinella bavarica Clessin, 1877
- † Bythinella bearnensis Cossmann & Peyrot, 1918
- Bythinella beckmanni A. Reischütz, P. L. Reischütz & W. Fischer, 2008
- Bythinella bertrandi R. Bernasconi, 2000
- Bythinella bicarinata (Des Moulins, 1827)
- Bythinella blidariensis Glöer, 2013
- Bythinella bouldouyrensis Girardi, 2015
- Bythinella bouloti Girardi, Bichain & Wienin, 2002
- Bythinella calimanica Falniowski, Szarowska & Sirbu, 2009
- Bythinella calquierensis Girardi & Boeters, 2015
- Bythinella carcasonis Boeters & Falkner, 2008
- Bythinella carinulata (Drouët, 1867): accepted as Bythinella viridis (Poiret, 1801)
- Bythinella cebennensis (Dupuy, 1851)
- Bythinella charpentieri (Roth, 1855)
- † Bythinella cirsophora Cossmann, 1888
- Bythinella collingi Boeters, 2009
- Bythinella companyoi (Paladilhe, 1870)
- Bythinella conica Clessin, 1910
- † Bythinella contemta Brusina, 1897
- Bythinella cretensis Schütt, 1980
- Bythinella curta Clessin, 1911
- † Bythinella cyclothyra (Boettger, 1869)
- Bythinella cylindracea (Paladilhe, 1869)
- Bythinella cylindrica (Frauenfeld, 1857)
- Bythinella dacica Grossu, 1946
- † Bythinella dalmatica Brusina, 1897
- † Bythinella damintunensis Youluo, 1978
- Bythinella darrieuxii (de Folin & Bérillon, 1877)
- Bythinella dedovi Glöer & Georgiev, 2011
- Bythinella deidamiae Glöer & Porfyris, 2022
- † Bythinella deshayesiana (Bourguignat, 1869)
- † Bythinella desnoyersi (Bourguignat, 1869)
- Bythinella dierckingi Glöer & Georgiev, 2011
- Bythinella dispersa Radoman, 1976
- Bythinella drimica Radoman, 1976
- Bythinella dromensis Boeters & Falkner, 2008
- † Bythinella dumenisliana (Bourguignat, 1869)
- † Bythinella edwardsiana (Bourguignat, 1869)
- Bythinella ehrmanni Pax, 1938
- Bythinella elenae Glöer & Georgiev, 2011
- Bythinella eleousae Glöer & Hirschfelder, 2020
- Bythinella ellinikae Glöer & Hirschfelder, 2020
- † Bythinella elongata Roshka, 1973
- Bythinella espanoli Bech, 1980
- Bythinella etrusca (Paladilhe, 1867)
- † Bythinella eugenii (Deshayes, 1862)
- Bythinella eurystoma (Paladilhe, 1870)
- Bythinella eutrepha (Paladilhe, 1867)
- † Bythinella expulsa (Deshayes, 1862)
- † Bythinella eysdenensis É. Vincent, 1930
- Bythinella falniowskii Glöer, 2013
- Bythinella feheri Glöer, 2013
- Bythinella ferussina (Des Moulins, 1827)
- Bythinella friderici Boeters & Falkner, 2008
- Bythinella fuscata Brancsik, 1889
- Bythinella galerae Girardi, Bichain & Wienin, 2002: accepted as Bythinella bouloti H. Girardi, Bichain & Wienin, 2002
- Bythinella geisserti Boeters & Falkner, 2003
- Bythinella georgievi Glöer, 2013
- Bythinella gibbosa (Moquin-Tandon, 1856)
- Bythinella gloeeri Georgiev, 2009
- Bythinella gokceadaensis D. A. Odabaşı, 2019
- Bythinella golemoensis Glöer & Mrkvicka, 2015
- † Bythinella gracillima Szőts, 1953
- Bythinella gregoi Glöer & Erőss, 2015
- Bythinella grossui Falniowski, Szarowska & Sirbu, 2009
- Bythinella guranensis (Paladilhe, 1870): accepted as Bythinella rubiginosa (Boubée, 1833)
- † Bythinella hanjiangensis W. Yü, 1977
- Bythinella hansboetersi Glöer & Pešić, 2006
- Bythinella hasanspahici Mulaomerović & Glöer, 2022
- Bythinella heydeni Clessin, 1879
- Bythinella heynemanniana Hazay, 1881
- Bythinella hungarica Hazay, 1880
- † Bythinella intermedia (Melleville, 1843)
- Bythinella istanbulensis Yıldırım, Kebapçı & Yüce, 2015
- Bythinella istoka Glöer & Pešić, 2014
- Bythinella izvorica Glöer & Georgiev, 2011
- Bythinella jobae (Bourguignat, 1862)
- Bythinella jodevidtsi Bichain & Bertrand, 2022
- Bythinella joinvillensis (Bourguignat, 1869)
- Bythinella jourdei R. Bernasconi, 2000
- Bythinella jozefgregoi Glöer & Reuselaars, 2020
- Bythinella kambosensis Glöer & Hirschfelder, 2020
- Bythinella kapelana Radoman, 1976
- Bythinella kastaliae Glöer & Hirschfelder, 2020
- Bythinella kastanolongosensis Glöer & Pešić, 2020
- Bythinella kazdaghensis Odabaşi & Georgiev, 2014
- Bythinella kleptuzica Glöer & Georgiev, 2011
- Bythinella klimaensis Glöer & Reuselaars, 2020
- Bythinella konstadinensis Glöer & Reuselaars, 2020
- Bythinella kosensis Schütt, 1980
- Bythinella kosmosi Clessin, 1910
- Bythinella kwanti Glöer & Reuselaars, 2020
- Bythinella kyriaki Glöer & Reuselaars, 2020
- Bythinella lancevelei Locard, 1894 accepted as Bythinella viridis (Poiret, 1801)
- †Bythinella lartetiana (Bourguignat, 1869)
- †Bythinella lecongensis W. Yü & X.-Q. Zhang, 1982
- Bythinella liandinaensis Glöer & Reuselaars, 2020
- Bythinella ligurica (Paladilhe, 1867)
- Bythinella limnopsis Letourneux & Bourguignat, 1887
- Bythinella longula Brancsik, 1889
- Bythinella lunzensis Boeters, 2008
- Bythinella luteola Radoman, 1976
- Bythinella magdalenae Yıldırım, Kebapçı & Bahadır Koca, 2015
- Bythinella magna Radoman, 1976
- Bythinella major (Pascal, 1873)
- Bythinella margritae Glöer & Georgiev, 2011
- Bythinella marianramosae Falniowski, Jaszczyńska & Hofman, 2023
- Bythinella marici Glöer & Pešić, 2014
- Bythinella markovi Glöer & Georgiev, 2009
- Bythinella mauritanica Letourneux & Bourguignat, 1887
- † Bythinella megarensis Bukowski, 1896
- Bythinella melovskii Glöer & Slavevska-Stamenković, 2015
- Bythinella metarubra Falniowski, 1987
- Bythinella micherdzinskii Falniowski, 1980
- Bythinella microcochlia Letourneux & Bourguignat, 1887
- †Bythinella minuata (Deshayes, 1862)
- Bythinella molcsanyi H. Wagner, 1941
- Bythinella moulinsii (Dupuy, 1849)
- Bythinella muranyii Glöer & Erőss, 2015
- Bythinella navacellensis Prié & Bichain, 2009
- Bythinella nonveilleri Glöer, 2008
- Bythinella normalis Courty, 1907
- Bythinella nothites (Westerlund, 1886)
- Bythinella occasiuncula Boeters & Falkner, 2001
- Bythinella olymbosensis Glöer & Reuselaars, 2020
- Bythinella opaca (M. von Gallenstein, 1848)
- Bythinella padana R. Bernasconi, 1989
- Bythinella padiraci Locard, 1903
- Bythinella pannonica (Frauenfeld, 1865)
- †Bythinella parkinsoni (J. Morris, 1854)
- Bythinella parvula Locard, 1893: accepted as Bythinella reyniesii (Dupuy, 1851)
- Bythinella perilongata Altimira, 1959
- Bythinella perivoliensis Glöer & Reuselaars, 2020
- Bythinella pesici Glöer & Reuselaars, 2020
- Bythinella pesterica Glöer, 2008
- Bythinella petrosensis Glöer, 2008
- Bythinella pujolensis R. Bernasconi, 2000: accepted as Bythinella bicarinata (Des Moulins, 1827)
- †Bythinella pulcherrima Szőts, 1953
- †Bythinella pulchra (Deshayes, 1862)
- Bythinella punica Letourneux & Bourguignat, 1887
- †Bythinella pupina (Deshayes, 1862)
- Bythinella pupoides (Paladilhe, 1869)
- Bythinella pyrenaica (Bourguignat, 1861)
- Bythinella rachonica Georgiev & Glöer, 2020
- Bythinella radomani Falniowski, Szarowska & Sirbu, 2009
- Bythinella ravnogorica Glöer & Georgiev, 2009
- Bythinella reischuetzi Glöer & Georgiev, 2020
- Bythinella rethymnonensis Glöer & Hirschfelder, 2020
- Bythinella reuselaarsi Glöer & Pešić, 2020
- Bythinella reyniesii (Dupuy, 1851)
- †Bythinella rhodanica Roman, 1912
- Bythinella rhodopensis Glöer & Georgiev, 2011
- Bythinella righaensis Glöer & Reuselaars, 2020
- Bythinella rilaensis Georgiev & Glöer, 2013
- †Bythinella rimulifera Stache, 1889
- Bythinella robiciana
- Bythinella robusta Z.-B. Kang, 1986
- Bythinella rolani Boeters, 2019
- Bythinella rondelaudi R. Bernasconi, 2000
- † Bythinella rothi (Brusina, 1884)
- Bythinella roubionensis Caziot, 1910
- Bythinella rouchi Boeters & Falkner, 2008
- Bythinella rouveyrolensis Girardi, 2015
- Bythinella rubiginosa (Boubee, 1833)
- Bythinella reyniesii (Dupuy, 1851)
- Bythinella samecana Clessin, 1911
- †Bythinella scalaris (Slavík, 1869)
- Bythinella schmidtii (Küster, 1852): accepted as Bythinella opaca (M. von Gallenstein, 1848)
- † Bythinella scitula Brusina, 1892
- Bythinella serborientalis Radoman, 1976
- Bythinella servainiana (Paladilhe, 1870)
- Bythinella sijei Mulaomerović & Glöer, 2022
- †Bythinella sinensis W. Yü & H.-Z. Pan, 1982
- Bythinella sirbui Glöer, 2013
- Bythinella sitiensis Glöer & Georgiev, 2011
- Bythinella slaveyae Glöer & Georgiev, 2011
- Bythinella smolyanica Glöer & Georgiev, 2011
- Bythinella solidula Brancsik, 1889
- Bythinella sordida (Küster, 1853)
- †Bythinella sphaeroidalis Cossmann, 1888
- Bythinella srednogorica Glöer & Georgiev, 2009
- Bythinella steffeki Grego & Glöer, 2019
- Bythinella stoychevae Georgiev, 2011
- Bythinella subovata (Paladilhe, 1876)
- Bythinella syngenes Preston, 1914
- Bythinella syntriculus Boeters & Falkner, 2008
- Bythinella szarowskae Glöer, 2013
- Bythinella tabakovaensis Mulaomerović & Glöer, 2023
- Bythinella tajoensis Boeters, 2019
- Bythinella taraensis Glöer & Pešić, 2010
- Bythinella taygetensis Glöer & Hirschfelder, 2020
- Bythinella tejedoi Boeters, 2019
- Bythinella temelkovi Georgiev & Glöer, 2014
- Bythinella thermophila Glöer, Varga & Mrkvicka, 2015
- Bythinella tornensis Hazay, 1881
- Bythinella troyana R. Bernasconi, 2000
- Bythinella truncata Courty, 1907
- Bythinella tumidula Clessin, 1910
- Bythinella turca (Radoman, 1976)
- Bythinella turriculata (Paladilhe, 1869)
- Bythinella ullaensis Boeters & Falkner, 2008
- Bythinella utriculus (Paladilhe, 1874)
- Bythinella valkanovi Glöer & Georgiev, 2011
- Bythinella vesontiana R. Bernasconi, 1989
- Bythinella vidinovae Dedov, Taseva & Georgiev, 2021
- Bythinella vimperei R. Bernasconi, 2000
- Bythinella viridis (Poiret, 1801)
- Bythinella viseuiana Falniowski, Szarowska & Sirbu, 2009
- † Bythinella vitrellaeformis Lörenthey, 1902
- Bythinella walensae Falniowski, Hofman & Rysiewska, 2016
- Bythinella walkeri Glöer & Georgiev, 2009
- Bythinella wawrzineki R. Bernasconi, 2002
- Bythinella westerlundi Glöer, 2022
- Bythinella wilkei Yıldırım, Kebapçı & Bahadır Koca, 2015
- Bythinella yerlii Gürlek, 2017
- Bythinella zyvionteki Falniowski, 1987

Relocated species:

- † Bythinella chinensis Y.-Y. Liu & W.-Z. Zhang, 1979 accepted as † Chencuia chinensis Y.-Y. Liu & W.-Z. Zhang, 1979
- Bythinella cvijici Pavlović, 1933 accepted as Prososthenia cvijici Pavlović, 1933
- † Bythinella falloti Degrange-Touzin, 1892 accepted as † Stenothyroides falloti (Degrange-Touzin, 1892)
- Bythinella nipponica S. Mori, 1937 accepted as Moria nipponica (S. Mori, 1937)
- Bythinella wantanensis Z.-B. Kang, 1983 accepted as Erhaia wantanensis (Z.-B. Kang, 1983)
