= Hochries =

Coordinates: 47°45′N 12°15′E

Highest point
- Elevation: 1,569 m (5,148 ft)

Geography
- Location: Bavaria, Germany

Hochries is a mountain in Bavaria, Germany. It is 1569 m high, and is located in the north-western part of the Chiemgauer Alpen. The summit can be reached by cable car from Grainbach. Starting from the village, a chairlift takes you to the middle station at 920 m above sea level. From there, a cable car leads to the summit.

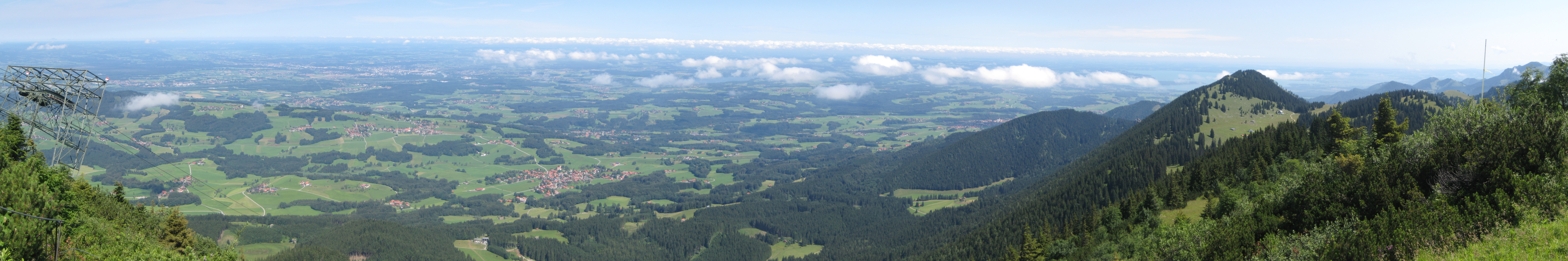
View from Hochries direction north

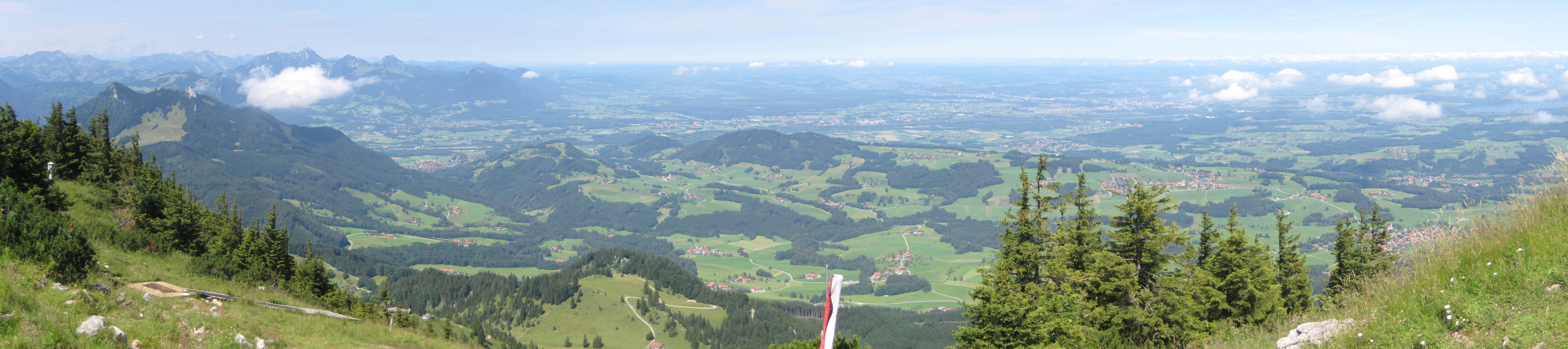
northwest

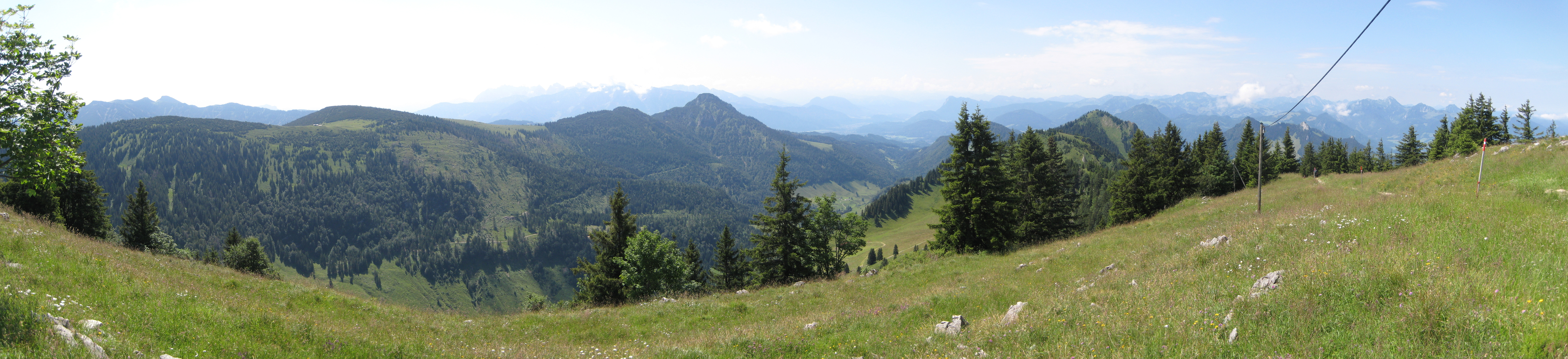
south
