= Hörndlwand =

Coordinates: 47°42′26″N 12°35′10″E

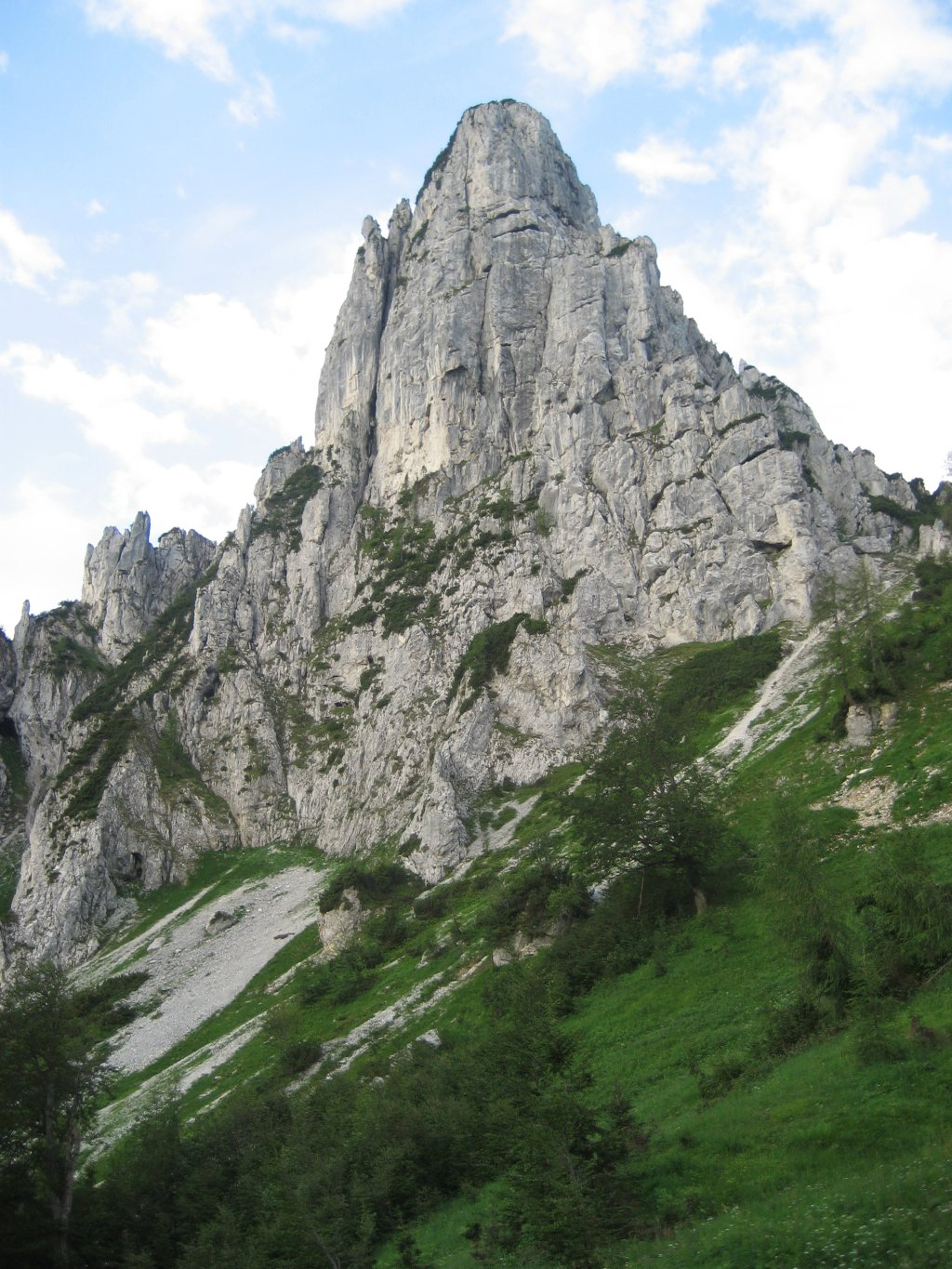

Highest point
- Elevation: 1,684 m (5,525 ft)

Geography
- Location: Bavaria, Germany

Hörndlwand is a mountain of Bavaria, Germany.
