= Unternberg (mountain) =

Mountain in Bavaria, Germany

Coordinates: 47°43′50″N 12°38′35″E

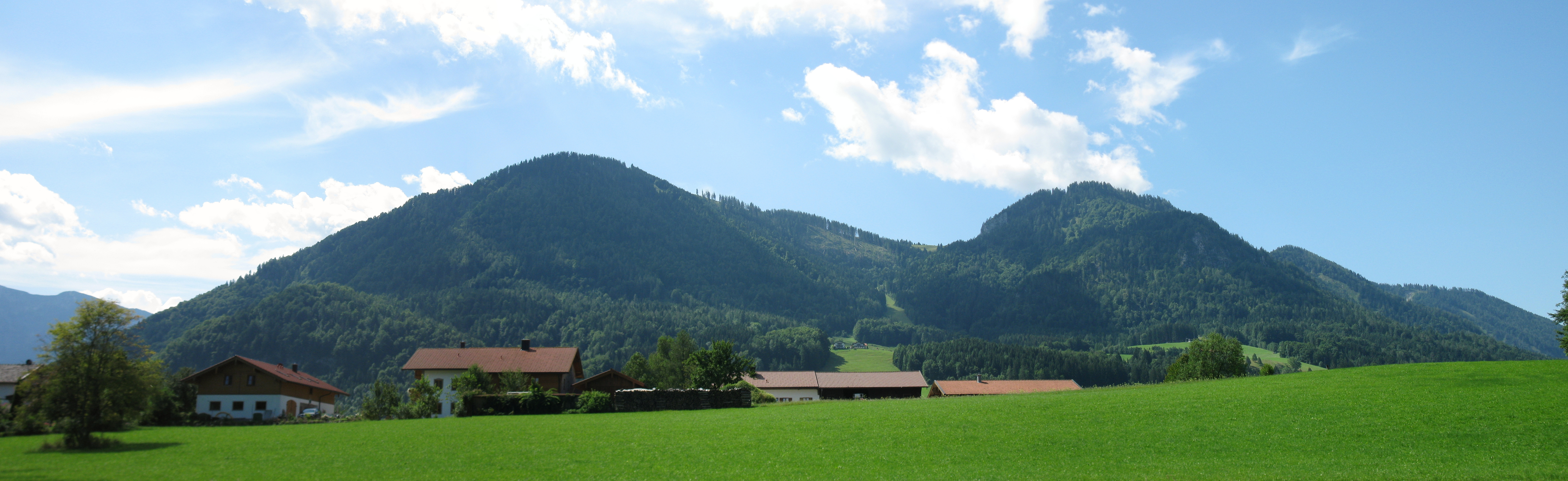
- The Unternberg seen from Ruhpolding.

Highest point
- Elevation: 1,425 m (4,675 ft)

Geography
- Location: Bavaria, Germany

Unternberg is a mountain of Bavaria, Germany.
