= Geigelstein =

Mountain in Bavaria, Germany

Coordinates: 47°42′28.27″N 12°20′4.10″E

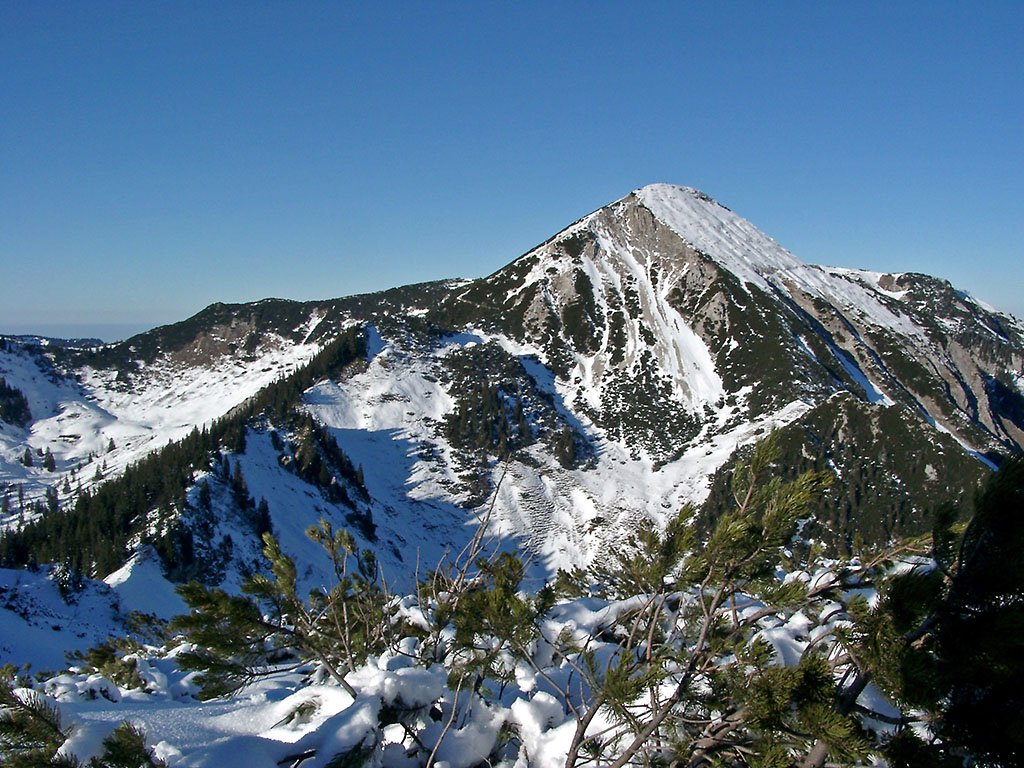

Highest point
- Elevation: 1,808 m (5,932 ft)
- Prominence: 1,148 m (3,766 ft)

Geography
- Location: Bavaria, Germany
- Parent range: Chiemgau Alps

Geigelstein is a mountain in Bavaria, Germany with an elevation of 1,808 meters above sea level. It is a mountain within the Chiemgau Alps. It is the highest point in its subrange, which shares its denomination. The highest point contains a small plateau with a cross.
