= Hochgern =

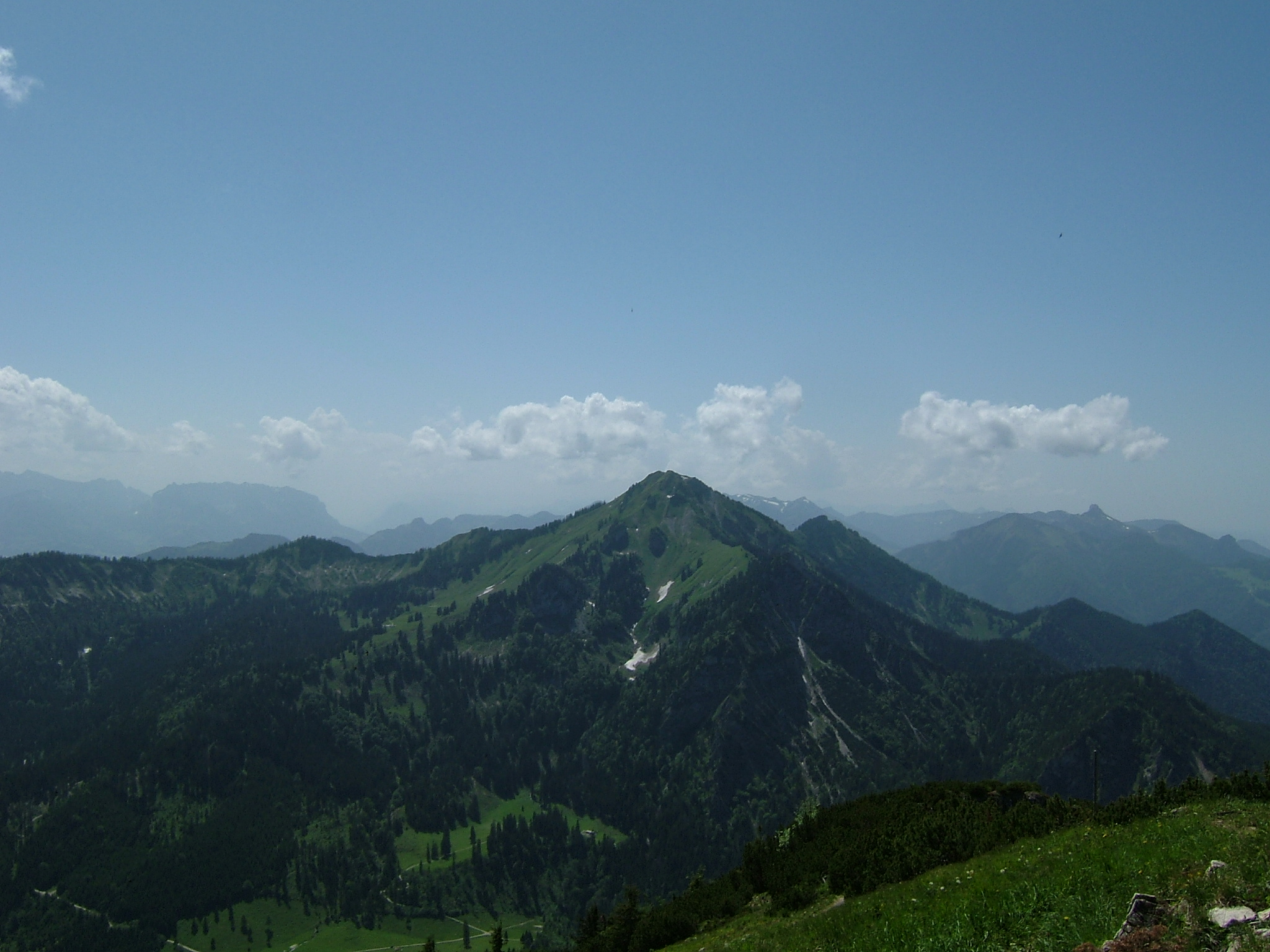

Highest point
- Elevation: 1,748 m (5,735 ft)
- Prominence: 967 m (3,173 ft)
- Coordinates: 47°45′00″N 12°31′00″E

Geography
- Location: Bavaria, Germany

The Hochgern is a mountain found in the Bavarian district of Traunstein, in Germany. It is part of the Chiemgau Alps and has a height of 1748 meters above sea level. The Hochgern marks the junction of the municipalities of Unterwössen, Marquartstein and Ruhpolding, as well as the Urschlau Forest district.

== Geography ==
The Hochgern, rising south of the Chiemsee, is a significant member of the Bavarian Alps. With a prominence of 967 meters, the peak is among the most important of the Chiemgau Alps. Several somewhat lower mountains cluster about its centrally located summit.
