= Heuberg (Chiemgau Alps) =

Coordinates: 47°43′36″N 12°11′06″E

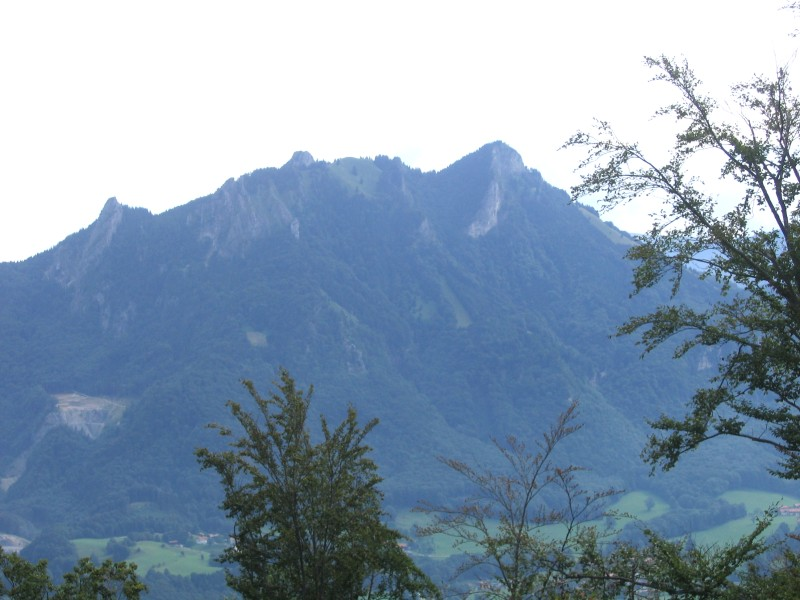

Highest point
- Elevation: 1,338 m (4,390 ft)

Geography
- Location: Bavaria, Germany

Heuberg (German pronunciation: [ˈhɔʏbɛʁk]) is a mountain of Bavaria, Germany.
