= Dürrnbachhorn =

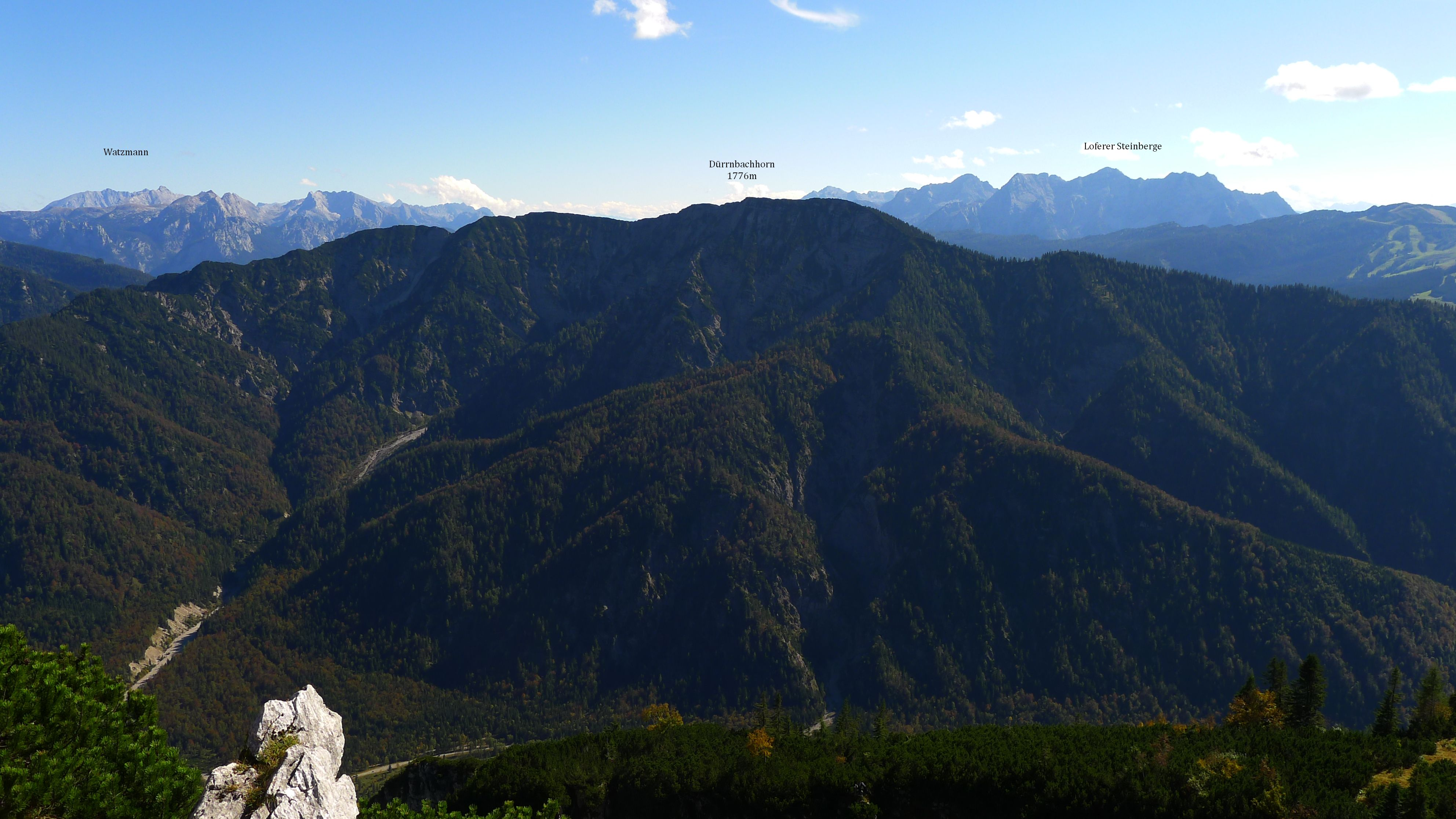

Highest point
- Elevation: 1,778 m (5,833 ft)
- Coordinates: 47°40′31″N 12°36′33″E

Geography
- Location: border between Bavaria, Germany and Salzburg, Austria
- Parent range: Chiemgau Alps

Dürrnbachhorn is a mountain of Bavaria, Germany.

It is located on the Austrian border beside the town of Reit im Winkl in the district of Traunstein, in the federal-state of Bavaria. On the Austrian side lies the town of Unken in the district of Zell am See, Salzburg.

There is a chairlift from Winklmoos-Alm at a height of 1 190 m to Dürrnbacheck at a height of 1 610 m above sea level. There are plans to connect the area to the Heutal ski resort in Unken.
