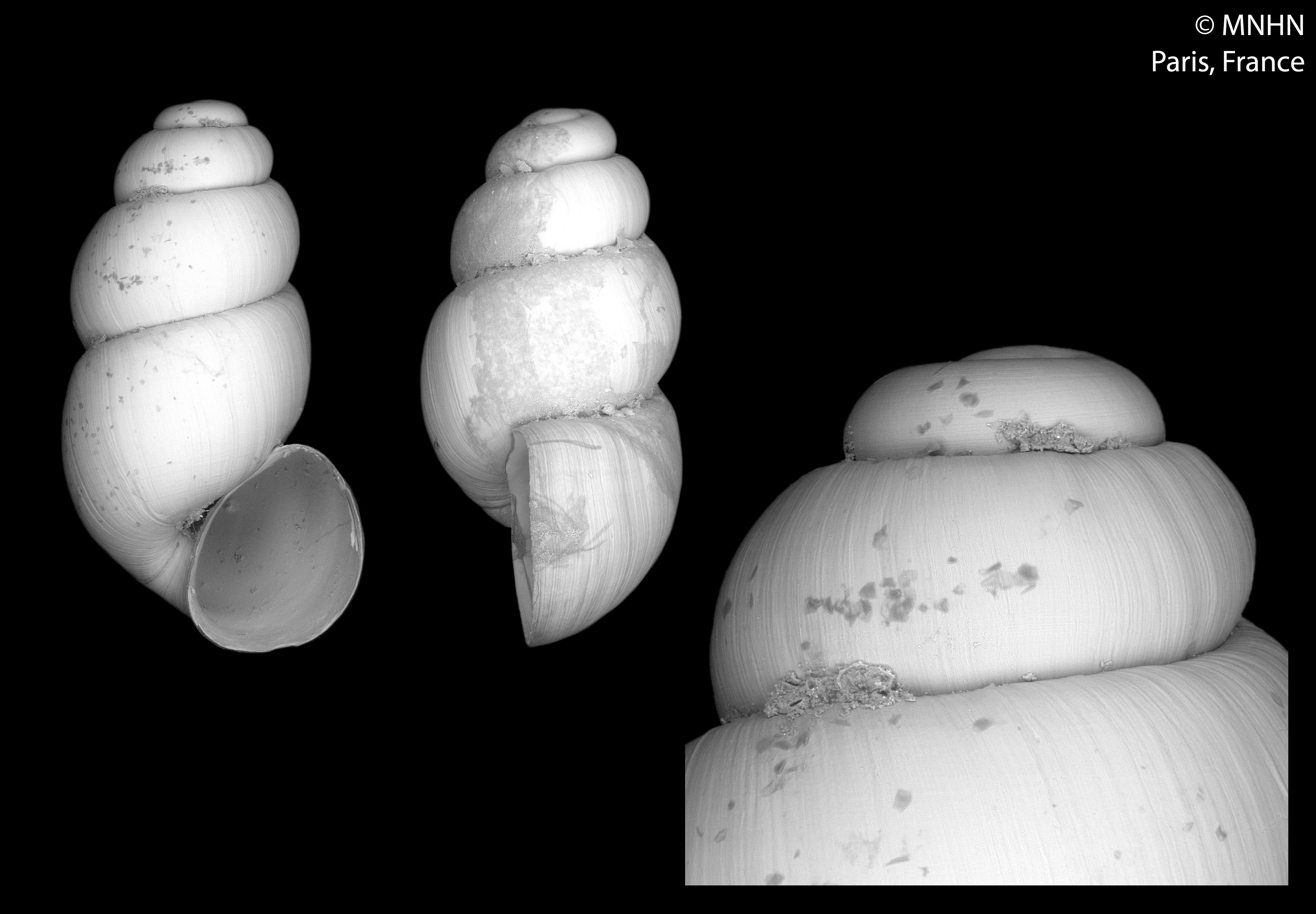
- Shell of Bythinella bouldouyrensis (paratype at MNHN, Paris)

Scientific classification
- Kingdom: Animalia
- Phylum: Mollusca
- Class: Gastropoda
- Subclass: Caenogastropoda
- Order: Littorinimorpha
- Superfamily: Truncatelloidea
- Family: Bythinellidae; Locard, 1893

Genera
- See text

= Bythinellidae =

Family of gastropods

Bythinellidae is a family of small freshwater snails with an operculum, aquatic gastropod molluscs in the order Littorinimorpha.

== Characteristics ==
(Original description in French) The shell is small and either turban-shaped or tower-shaped, with a narrow umbilicus and an entire aperture. The operculum is horny or calcareous and may be concentric, spiral, or nearly spiral.

Their minute shell is often colored. They are characterized by a calcareous operculum, a lobe on the upper surface of the neck. The ctenidium, the respiratory gill-comb, is very broad. They have a ciliary feeding habit. The kidney has a large extension towards the mantle.

== Genera ==
Genera in the family Bythinellidae include:

- Bythinella Moquin-Tandon, 1856

Genera brought into synonymy

- Acrophlyctis Cossmann, 1888 †: synonym of Bythinella (Acrophlyctis) Cossmann, 1888 † represented as Bythinella Moquin-Tandon, 1856
- Bithinella [sic]: synonym of Bythinella Moquin-Tandon, 1856 (incorrect subsequent spelling)
- Bithynella Moquin-Tandon, 1856: synonym of Bythinella Moquin-Tandon, 1856 (incorrect subsequent spelling)
- Bythynella: synonym of Bythinella Moquin-Tandon, 1856 (invalid: incorrect subsequent spelling)
- Microna Frauenfeld, 1863: synonym of Bythinella Moquin-Tandon, 1856
- Terrestribythinella Sitnikova, Starobogatov & V. Anistratenko, 1992: synonym of Bythinella Moquin-Tandon, 1856 (junior subjective synonym)
