= Marcel Rüedi =

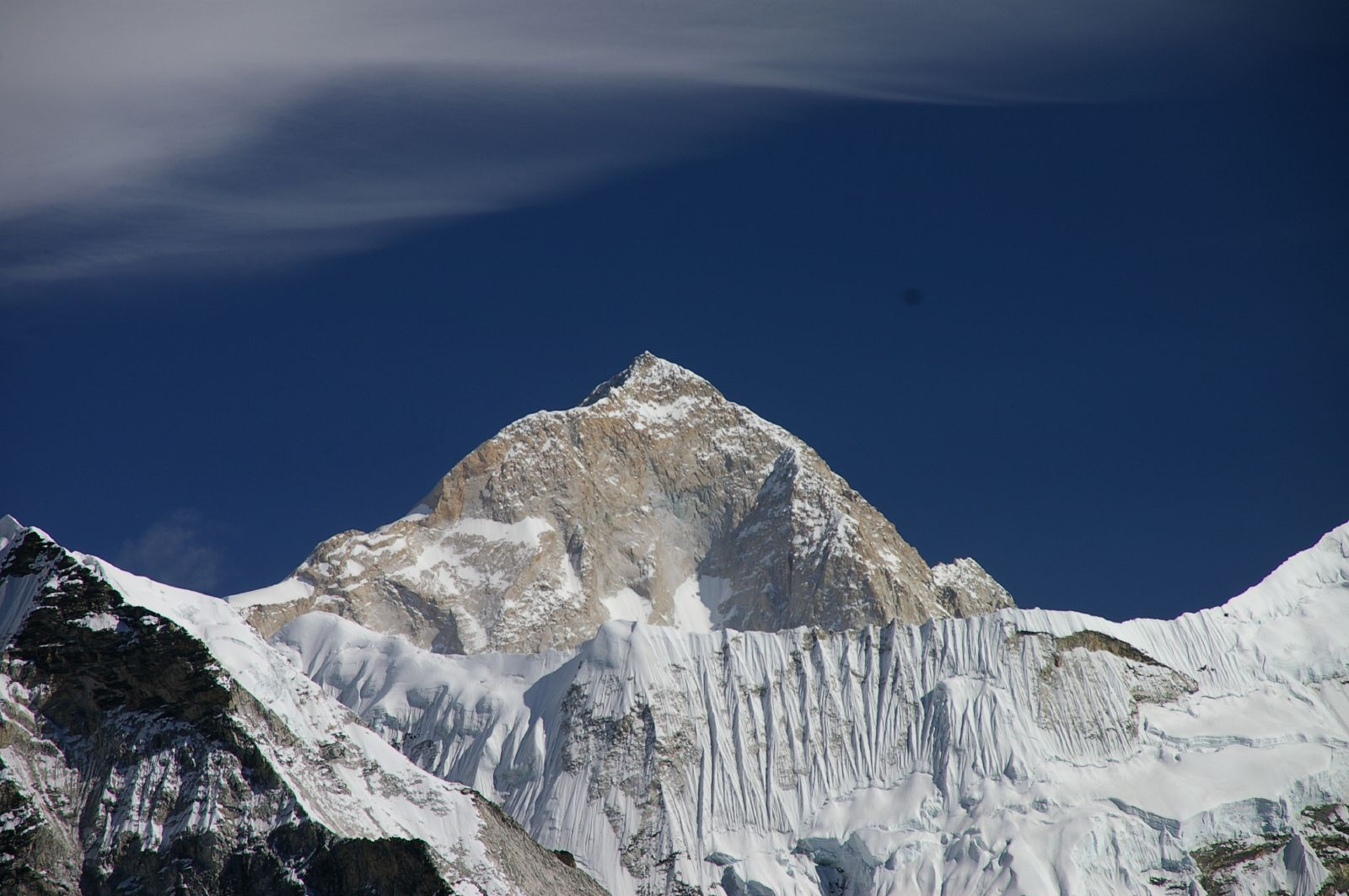
Makalu from the southwest

Marcel Rüedi (1 November 1938 in Winterthur – 25 September 1986 in Makalu) was a Swiss climber who reached the summit of ten of the eight-thousanders.

In 1980, Rüedi ascended Dhaulagiri. In 1981 he forged a new route along the North Face of the Eiger in the Bernese Alps. In 1983, together with Erhard Loretan and Jean-Claude Sonnenwyl, Rüedi climbed the three main summits of the Gasherbrum Group within 15 days, reaching Gasherbrum I via a standard route variation. In 1984, he reached the peaks of Manaslu and Nanga Parbat, officially climbing five eight-thousanders in only twelve months.

In 1986, Rüedi was the first Swiss, along with Peter Habeler, to summit Cho Oyu. That same year, he and Krzysztof Wielicki attempted to climb Makalu via a standard route variation. Krzysztof Wielicki reached the summit a few hours before Rüedi and was able to descend to the nearest bivouac shelter. Rüedi did not succeed. Reinhold Messner, who was also at Makalu at the time, claims to have seen Rüedi descending from the summit, and watched as he disappeared behind a snowdrift. Messner later found Rüedi sitting dead in the snow just below his camp.
