= Reinhard Karl =

German mountaineer, photographer, and writer (1946-1982)

- Born: November 3, 1946; Heidelberg, Germany
- Died: May 19, 1982 (aged 35); Cho Oyu, China-Nepal border
- Occupations: Mountaineer, photographer, writer

Reinhard Karl (3 November 1946 – 19 May 1982) was a German mountaineer, photographer, and writer.

== Early life ==
Karl was born in Heidelberg. At the age of 14, he started working as a mechanic apprentice. Later on, he joined night classes to complete high school. When he was admitted to daily school, he left his work as a mechanic to continue his studies in Frankfurt. He later became a professional mountain photographer and also wrote several books. At the beginning of his career, climbing during weekends was his way to escape from his work as a mechanic, which he disliked.

He discovered his passion for mountains thanks to his readings; in his autobiography he specifically mentions Achttausend drüber und drunter by Hermann Buhl and a book on Everest's ascent by Edmund Hillary. His mother encouraged him by sending him to the Mountain Club in Heidelberg, where he met Hermann Kühn, partner in several ascents, including the Eiger's north face.

== Climbing experience ==
Karl's career started with his first climbing experiences on Battert, near Baden-Baden. He mastered several styles of climbing, ranging from alpine style in Europe and South America, free climbing and eight-thousanders.

=== Alps ===
He climbed several famous mountains and routes in the Alps, such as:

- the Bonatti pillar on Aiguille du Dru
- the Walker Spur on the north face of the Grandes Jorasses (1968)
- the Eiger north face, after several failed attempts (1969)
- the north face of Les Droites, in the Mont Blanc massif
- the Hemming- Robbins on the west face of Aiguille du Dru
- the Pillar of Frêney on Mont Blanc

=== Yosemite ===
Karl visited Yosemite several times, where he experienced both Big wall climbing and free climbing. He climbed several big walls. In 1975, he climbed Half Dome north-west face and the Nose on El Capitan, Salathé Wall in 1977 and Son of Heart in 1978 on El Capitan. He also got in contact with American climbers spending their summers in Yosemite, such as Ron Kauk and John Bachar, masters of bouldering.

=== Free Climbing ===
After his experience at Yosemite, he applied his new vision of climbing in Battert crag.
In 1977, Karl and Helmut Kiene realised the first grade VII climbing with the free ascent of the Pumprisse on the Fleischbank, on the Kaisergebirge.

=== Eight-thousenders ===
Karl was the first German to reach the summit of Mount Everest (with oxygen) on 10 May 1978, with Oswald Olz. He was part, as photographer, of the same expedition which saw Reinhold Messner and Peter Habeler climb Mount Everest for the first time without supplemental oxygen. Karl's second eight-thousander was Gasherbrum II, in Karakorum, with Hans Schell in 1979.

=== South America ===
In 1980 Karl's attempt, with Hans Martin Götz, to climb Cerro Torre failed when they spent the night at only 250 meters from the top. Also his attempt to climb the Supercanaleta on Fitz Roy with Luis Fraga did not succeed. His last mountain was Fitz Roy, which he climbed in 1982 with Peter Luthy on the south-west face (route Chouinard) two weeks after the failed attempt on Supercanaleta.

== Works ==
Karl has also had an important part in documenting mountain climbing in his pictures and books.

His books are the following:

- Erlebnis Berg: Zeit zum Atmen (Adventure Mountain: Time to breathe)
- Yosemite – Klettern im senkrechten Paradies (Yosemite - climbing the vertical paradise)
- Berge auf Kodachrome (Mountains on Kodachrome)

== Death ==
Karl died on 19 May 1982 in an ice avalanche at Camp II 6,900 metres (22,600 ft) on Cho Oyu, during his attempt to climb his third eight-thousander.
