= Jules Lewis =

British motivational speaker

- Born: Julie Miles Lewis; 1962 (age 63–64)
- Education: Sheffield Hallam University
- Occupations: Writer, motivational speaker, adventurer
- Writing career
- Genre: Personal Leadership
- Website: www.juleslewis.com

Julie Miles Lewis (born 1962) is a British motivational speaker, author, personal leadership specialist and founder of Mountain High.

== Early life and education ==
Lewis was born in Yorkshire, England and received a BSc in Sports Science from Sheffield Hallam University. She is a certified NLP Master and coach, Mindfulness facilitator, Certified Stress Management instructor and is currently in practice with the Institute of Zen Leadership.

== Career ==
Lewis spent 18 years in the Health, Fitness and Sports management industry before, in 2003, establishing Mountain High, an organization offering unique signature expeditions which allow participants to explore the planet and challenge their physical and mental capabilities. She has trained and led multi-national teams of men and women on more than 50 expeditions to over 20 countries to include the Arctic and Antarctica. Jules has climbed 19 high-altitude mountains, reaching a personal best height of 7000m on Cho Oyu in Tibet.

Lewis 2003, Jules has facilitated expeditions to raise awareness and funds for breast cancer in the United Arab Emirates. In 2012, she took the first and only team of breast cancer survivors from the U.A.E. to Antarctica for an 11-day multi-activity challenge.

Lewis's debut book, Moving Mountains: Discover the Mountain in You, was published by Panoma Press in May, 2016. ISBN 978-1784520892
