= Lynn Schooler =

American writer and outdoorsman

- Born: San Antonio, Texas
- Occupations: Author, photographer, outdoorsman
- Writing career
- Pen name: Lynn D'Urso
- Period: 2002-present
- Genres: Memoir, nonfiction
- Website: www.alaskawritersdirectory.com/authors/schooler_lynn.shtml

Lynn Schooler is an American novelist, nonfiction author, photographer, an outdoorsman, and Alaskan wilderness guide living in Juneau, Alaska. He wrote The Blue Bear, The Last Shot and Walking Home.

== Biography ==
Schooler, originally from San Antonio, Texas, has lived in Alaska since 1969. He is a two-time winner of Alaska magazine's grand prize for wildlife photography and winner of the National Wildlife grand prize.

== Writing ==
His first book, The Blue Bear: A True Story of Friendship, Tragedy, and Survival, released in 2002 by The Ecco Press, is a memoir that tells the story of the author's friendship with the Japanese wildlife photographer Michio Hoshino, who is killed by a brown bear in the Kurilskoya brown-bear refuge on the Kamchatka Peninsula on August 8, 1996. In 2002, The Telegraph described The Blue Bear as "a hybrid: part memoir, part natural history and part anecdote." In a review, The New York Times wrote, "The quest to find a blue bear and photograph it emerges as the implicit bond between the author and Michio Hoshino. ... It leads Schooler sometimes through platitudinous country, where the sea-road is all too familiar. But it also takes him, and us, where we have never been before." In 2011, the book was adapted as a stage play by Perseverance Theater in Juneau, Alaska.

In 2005, Schooner released The Last Shot: The Incredible Story of the CSS Shenandoah and the True Conclusion of the American Civil War. Published by HarperCollins, the book recounts the extraordinary success of the Confederate warship that didn't cease hostilities until June 22, 1865, three months after the surrender of General Robert E. Lee at Appomattox.

In 2010, Schooler released a second memoir, Walking Home: A Traveler in the Alaskan Wilderness, a Journey into the Human Heart. It is the story of his solo trek along one of North America's wildest coastlines. He shares tales of Alaska's history, with adventure stories from many nations and the region's indigenous Tlingit Indians. In August 2010, the memoir was broadcast as Book of the Week on BBC Radio 4. The programme was produced by Rosalynd Ward and the book was read by Colin Stinton.

He has also written fiction under the pen name Lynn D'Urso. His first novel, Heartbroke Bay was a finalist for the Pacific Northwest Booksellers Award. Heartbroke Bay was also selected as a USA Today Best Book of 2011. Publishers Weekly summed up the book as a "prospectors' amazing tale of survival and proves to be an unsettling portrait of human greed, deceit, and betrayal, ably captured by D'Urso's lean, direct prose."

== Awards ==
The Blue Bear was awarded the French literary prize Prix Littéraire 30 Millions d'Ami. It was also named a Notable Book by the awards panel for the Kiriyama Prize for cross-cultural communication and was selected by the editors at Amazon.com as their #1 Choice in Nature Writing for 2002.

In November 2010, Walking Home was given the 2010 Banff Mountain Festival John Whyte Award for Mountain Literature.
