= Ronald Naar =

Dutch mountaineer

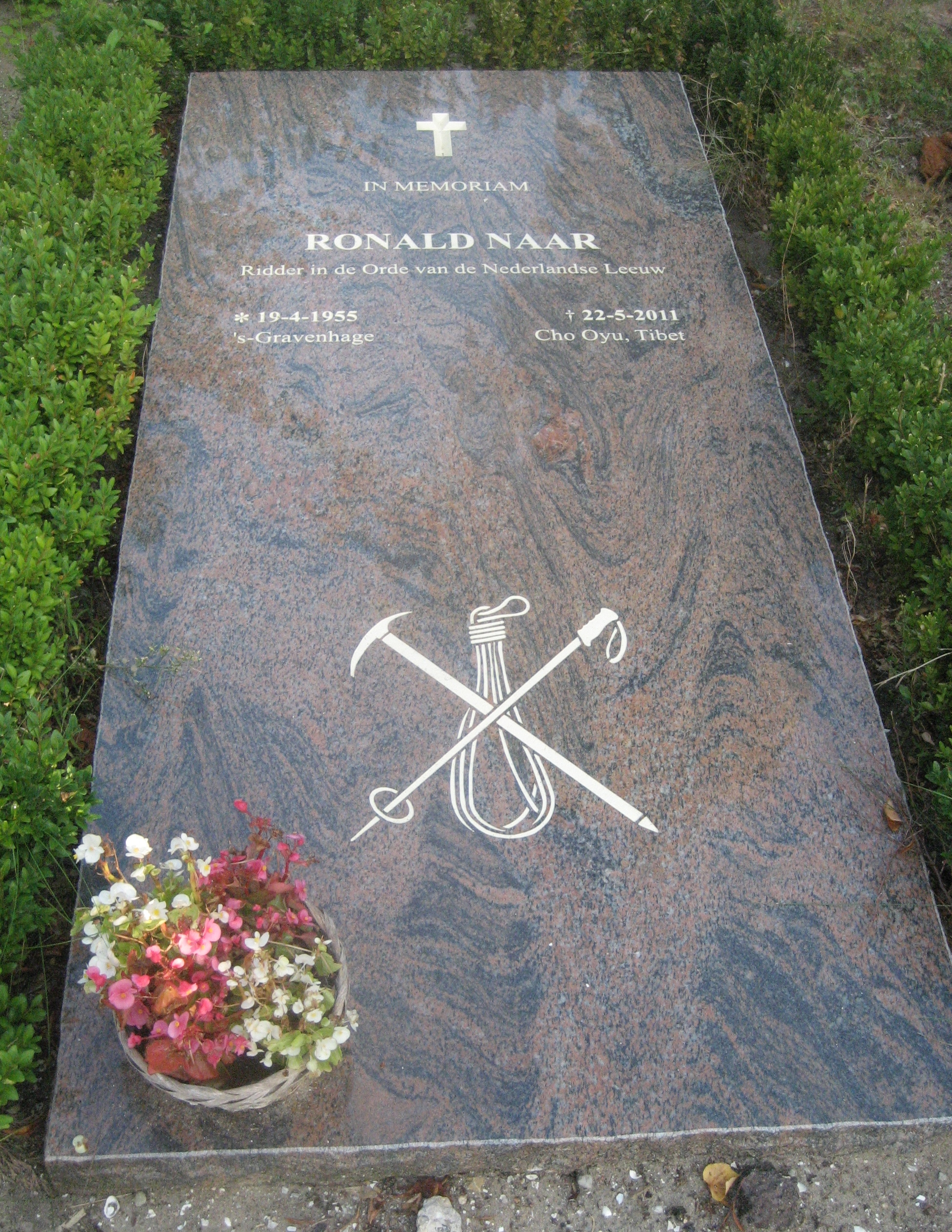
The grave of Ronald Naar at the Petrus Banden Cemetery, the Hague

Ronald Edwin Naar (19 April 1955 – 22 May 2011) was a Dutch mountaineer. He was born in The Hague, and was an active climber from the 1970s onwards. He made the first ascents of Peak 6393 in the Karakoram, Djo Drake in Bhutan, Tilleketinda on Greenland and Duivelsei in Suriname. He made the first Dutch ascents of several mountains, including the Eiger (north face) and K2, and was the first Dutch climber to complete the Seven Summits. He wrote several books about climbing.

He was criticized internationally in 1992, when during a climb of Mount Everest he ordered his expedition to do nothing to assist a dying Indian climber, 30 metres (98 ft) away from their camp. Naar addressed his critics in his 2004 book, Leven en dood op de Mount Everest (Life and death on Mount Everest). Naar himself died while climbing on Cho Oyu in Tibet at an altitude of around 8000 metres (26,200 feet) after becoming unwell.
