= Herbert Tichy =

Austrian author, geologist, journalist and climber

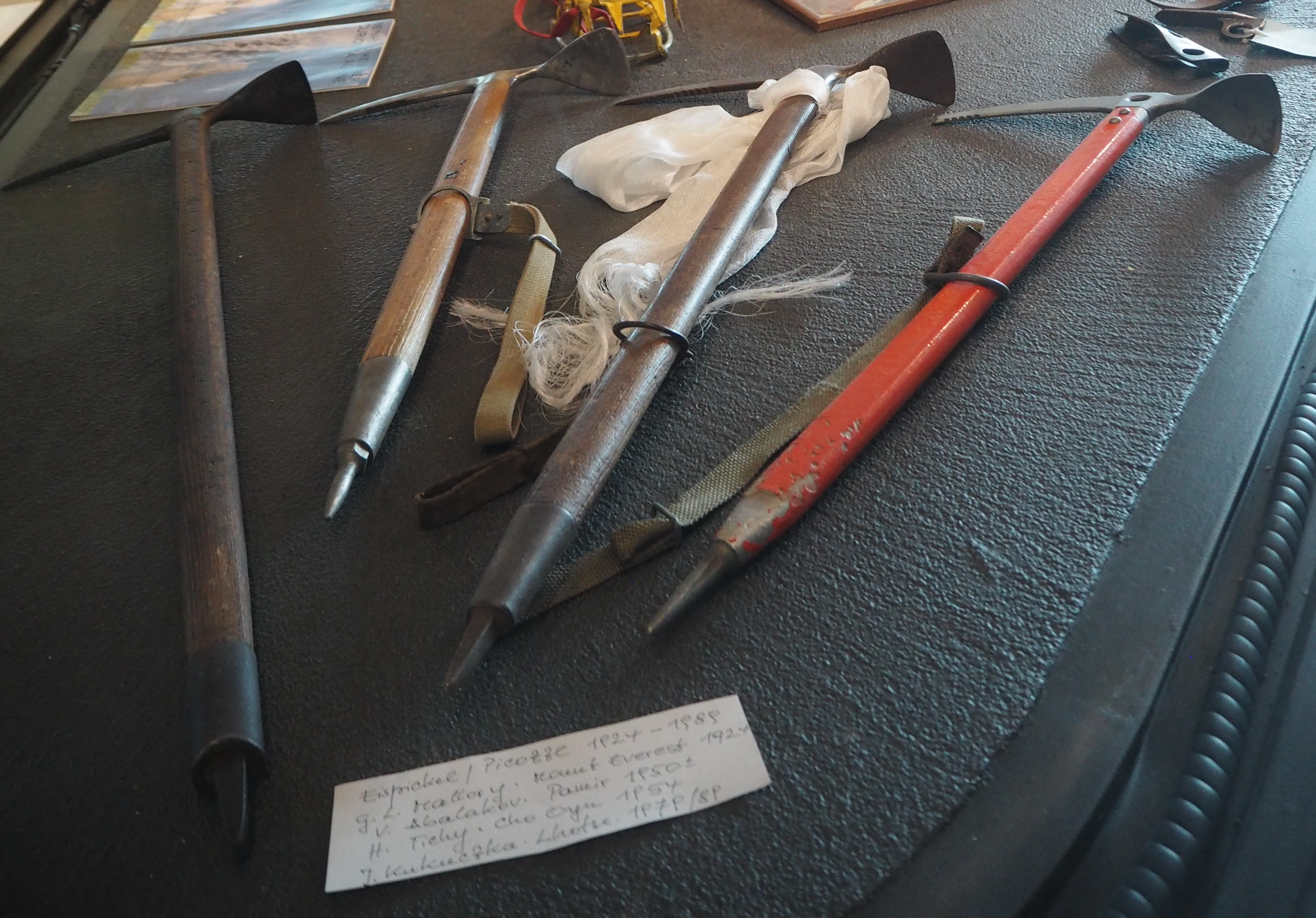
Tichy's ice ax used on Cho Oyu (second from right)

Herbert Tichy (1 June 1912 – 26 September 1987) was an Austrian writer, geologist, journalist and climber.

Along with Sepp Jöchler and Pasang Dawa Lama, Tichy made the first ascent of Cho Oyu on 19 October 1954. Tichy documented the climb in his book Cho Oyu, Cho Oyu: By Favour Of The Gods, published in 1957.

== See also ==
- List of Austrian mountaineers
