= Reinhold Messner =

Italian mountaineer, adventurer and explorer (born 1944)

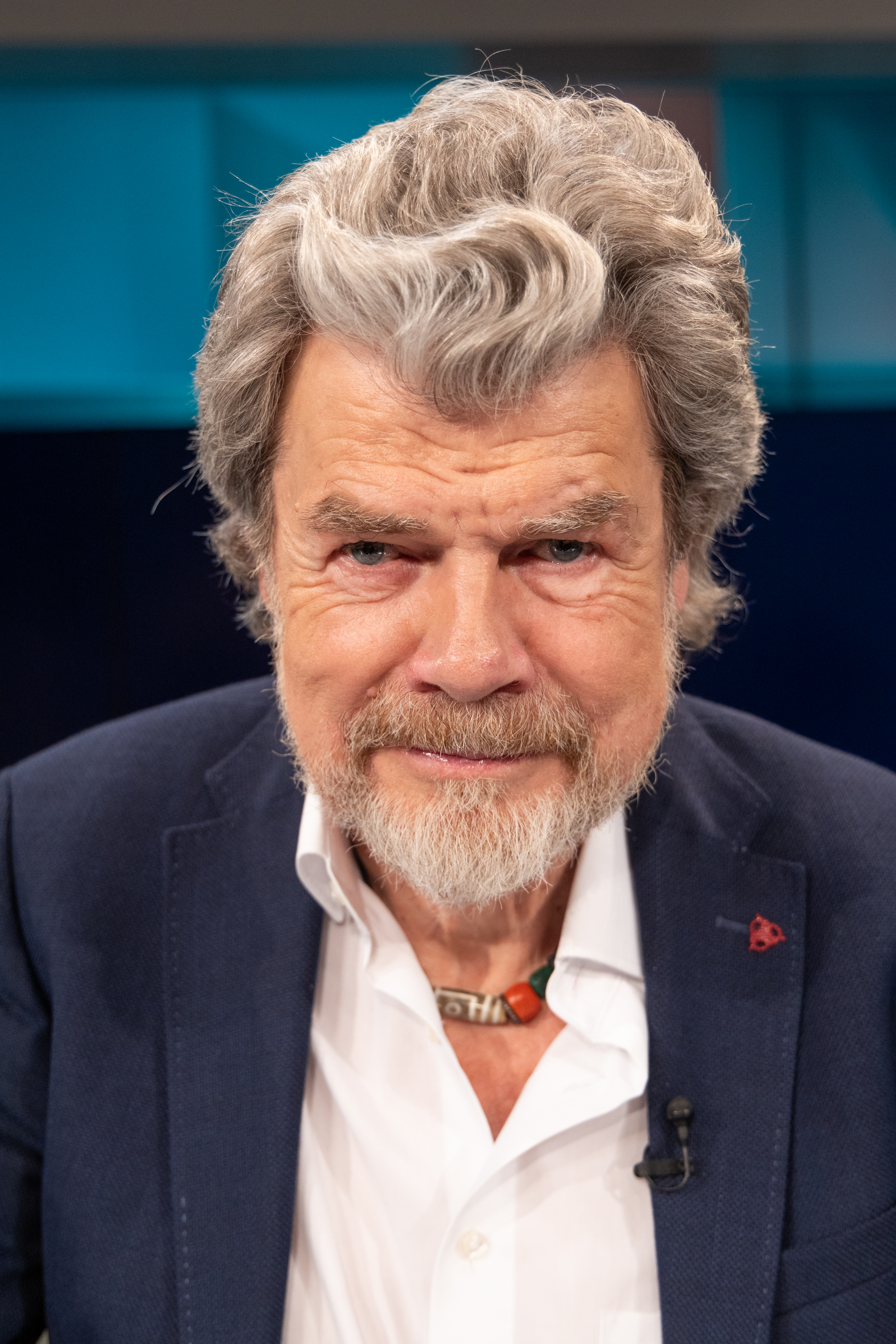
- Messner in 2024

Personal information
- Nationality: Italian
- Born: 17 September 1944 (age 82) Brixen (Bressanone), South Tyrol, Italy
- Website: Official website

Climbing career
- Type of climber: Alpine climbing; Big wall climbing; Traditional climbing
- First ascents: Agnèr northeast face; Nanga Parbat Rupal face; Heiligkreuzkofel middle pillar; Marmolada south face; Yerupaja east face; Yerupaja Chico
- Major ascents: First solo ascent of Mount Everest and first ascent without supplemental oxygen
- Known for: First to climb all 14 eight-thousanders, first to climb all 14 eight-thousanders without supplemental oxygen, and first to climb Mount Everest without supplementary oxygen

Reinhold Andreas Messner (German: [ˈʁaɪnhɔlt ˈmɛsnɐ]; born 17 September 1944) is an Italian climber, explorer, and author from the German-speaking province of South Tyrol. He made the first solo ascent of Mount Everest and, along with Peter Habeler, the first ascent of Everest without supplementary oxygen. He was the first person to climb all 14 eight-thousanders, doing so without supplementary oxygen. Messner was the first to cross Antarctica and Greenland with neither snowmobiles nor dog sleds and also crossed the Gobi Desert alone. He is widely considered to be the greatest high-altitude mountaineer of all time.

From 1999 to 2004, Messner served as a member of the European Parliament for north-east Italy, as a member of the Federation of the Greens.

Messner has published more than 80 books about his experiences as a climber and explorer. In 2010, he received the 2nd Piolet d'Or Lifetime Achievement Award. In 2018, he received jointly with Krzysztof Wielicki the Princess of Asturias Award in the category of Sports.

== Early life and education ==
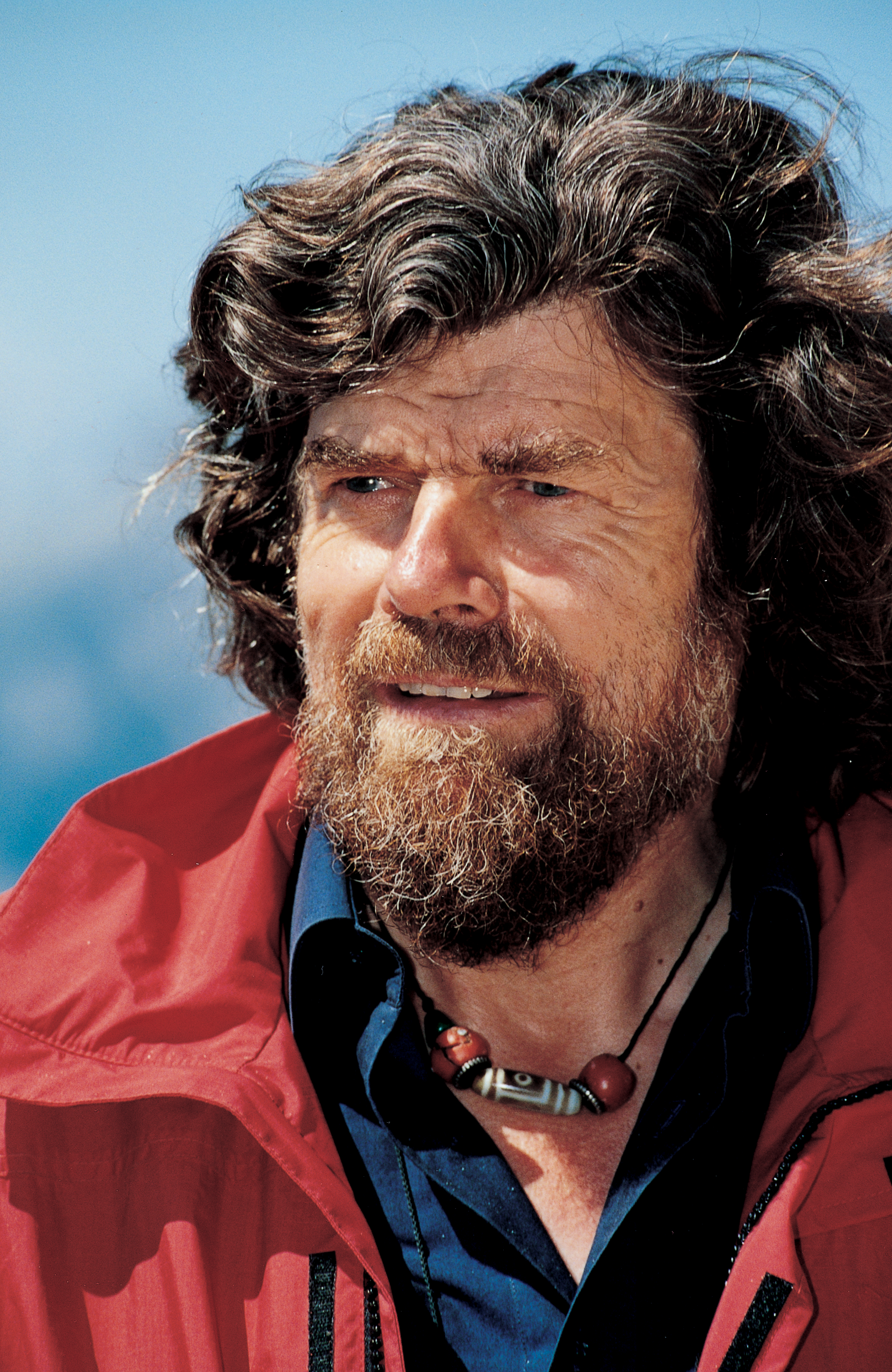
Reinhold Messner in June 2002

Messner was born to a German-speaking family in St. Peter, Villnöß, near Brixen in South Tyrol, which is part of Italy. According to his sister, his delivery was difficult as he was a large baby and the birth took place during an air raid. His mother Maria (1915–1997) was the daughter of a shop owner and was 2 years older than her husband, whilst his father Josef (1917–1985) was drafted to serve the Wehrmacht and participated in World War II on the Russian front. After the war, he was an auxiliary teacher until 1957, when he became the director of the local school. Messner was the second-born child out of nine children; eight sons and a daughter namely Helmut (born 1942), Günther (1946–1970), Erich (born 1948), Waltraud (born 1950), Siegfried (1952–1985), Hubert (born 1954), Hansjörg (born 1956) and Werner (born 1958), all grew up in modest means.

Messner spent his early years climbing in the Alps and falling in love with the Dolomites. His father was strict and sometimes severe with him. He led Reinhold to his first summit at the age of five.

When Messner was 13, he began climbing with his brother Günther, age 11. By the time Reinhold and Günther were in their early twenties, they were among Europe's best climbers.

Since the 1960s, Messner, inspired by Hermann Buhl, was one of the first and most enthusiastic supporters of alpine style mountaineering in the Himalayas, which consisted of climbing with very light equipment and a minimum of external help. Messner considered the usual expedition style (which he dubbed "siege tactics") disrespectful toward nature and mountains.

== Career ==
Before his first major Himalayan climb in 1970, Messner had made a name for himself mainly through his achievements in the Alps. Between 1950 and 1964, he led over 500 ascents, most of them in the Dolomites. In 1965, he climbed a new direttissima route on the north face of the Ortler. A year later, he climbed the Walker Spur on the Grandes Jorasses and ascended the Rocchetta Alta di Bosconero. In 1967, he made the first ascent of the northeast face of the Agnèr and the first winter ascents of the Agnèr north face and Furchetta north face.

In 1968, he achieved further firsts: the Heiligkreuzkofel middle pillar and the direct south face of the Marmolada. In 1969, Messner joined an Andes expedition, during which he succeeded, together with Peter Habeler, in making the first ascent of the Yerupaja east face up to the summit ridge and, a few days later, the first ascent of the 6,121-metre-high (20,082 ft) Yerupaja Chico. He also made the first solo ascent of the Droites north face, the Philipp-Flamm intersection on the Civetta and the south face of Marmolada di Rocca. As a result, Messner won the reputation of being one of the best climbers in Europe.

In 1970, Messner was invited to join a major Himalayan expedition that was going to attempt the unclimbed Rupal face of Nanga Parbat. The expedition, which was the major turning point in his life, turned out to be a tragic success. Both he and his brother Günther reached the summit but Günther died two days later on the descent of the Diamir face. Reinhold lost seven toes, which had become badly frostbitten during the climb and required amputation. Reinhold was severely criticized for persisting on this climb with the less experienced Günther. The 2010 movie Nanga Parbat by Joseph Vilsmaier is based on his account of the events.

While Messner and Peter Habeler were noted for fast ascents in the Alps of the Eiger North Wall, standard route (10 hours) and Les Droites (8 hours), his 1975 Gasherbrum I first ascent of a new route took three days. This was unheard of at the time.

In the 1970s, Messner championed the cause for ascending Mount Everest without supplementary oxygen, saying that he would do it "by fair means" or not at all. In 1978, he reached the summit of Everest with Habeler. This was the first time anyone had been that high without supplemental oxygen and Messner and Habeler achieved what certain doctors, specialists, and mountaineers thought impossible. He repeated the feat, without Habeler, from the Tibetan side in 1980, during the monsoon season. This was Everest's first solo summit.

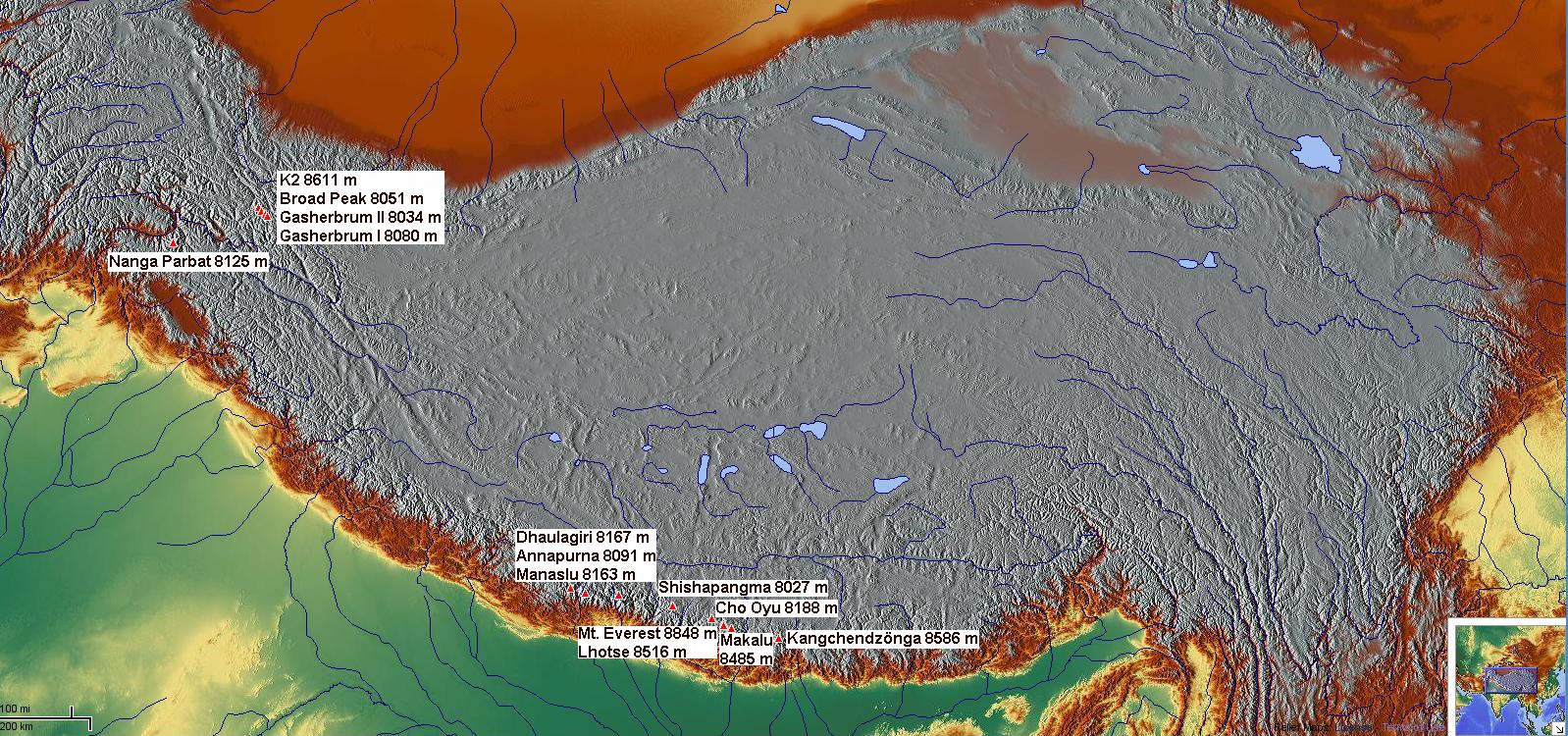
Location of the eight-thousanders

In 1978, he made a solo ascent of the Diamir face of Nanga Parbat. In 1986, Messner became the first to complete all fourteen eight-thousanders (peaks over 8,000 metres above sea level).

Messner has crossed Antarctica on skis, together with fellow explorer Arved Fuchs. He has written over 80 books about his experiences, a quarter of which have been translated. He was featured in the 1984 film The Dark Glow of the Mountains by Werner Herzog. From 1999 to 2004, he held political office as a Member of the European Parliament for the Italian Green Party (Federazione dei Verdi). He was also among the founders of Mountain Wilderness, an international NGO dedicated to the protection of mountains worldwide.

In 2004 he completed a 2,000-kilometre (1,200 mi) expedition through the Gobi Desert. In 2006, he founded the Messner Mountain Museum.

== Expeditions ==
=== Ascents above 8,000m ===
Messner was the first person to climb all fourteen eight-thousanders in the world and without supplemental oxygen. His climbs were also all amongst the first 20 ascents for each mountain individually. Specifically, these are:

Year	Peak	Remarks
1970	Nanga Parbat (8,125 m or 26,657 feet)	First ascent of the unclimbed Rupal Face and first traverse of the mountain by descending along the unexplored Diamir Face with his brother Günther. Prior to this ascent, Messner had not previously visited the Greater Ranges and the greatest altitude he had been to was on the expedition to the Andes in 1969.
1972	Manaslu (8,163 m or 26,781 feet)	First ascent of the unclimbed South-West Face and first ascent of Manaslu without supplemental oxygen.
1975	Gasherbrum I (8,080 m or 26,510 feet)	First ascent without supplemental oxygen with Peter Habeler.
1978	Mount Everest (8,848 m or 29,029 feet), Nanga Parbat (8,125 m or 26,657 feet)	First ascent of Everest without supplementary oxygen (with Peter Habeler). Nanga Parbat: first solo ascent of an eight-thousander from base camp. He established a new route on the Diamir Face, which has since then never been repeated.
1979	K2 (8,611 m or 28,251 feet)	Ascent partially in alpine style with Michael Dacher on the Abruzzi Spur.
1980	Mount Everest (8,848 m or 29,029 feet)	First to ascend alone and without supplementary oxygen – from base camp to summit – during the monsoon. He established a new route on the North Face.
1981	Shishapangma (8,027 m or 26,335 feet)	Ascent with Friedl Mutschlechner.
1982	Kangchenjunga (8,586 m or 28,169 feet), Gasherbrum II (8,034 m or 26,358 feet), Broad Peak (8,051 m or 26,414 feet)	New route on Kangchenjunga's North Face, partially in alpine style with Friedl Mutschlechner. Gasherbrum II and Broad Peak: Both ascents with Sher Khan and Nazir Sabir. Messner becomes the first person to climb three 8000er in one season. Also a failed summit attempt on Cho Oyu during winter.
1983	Cho Oyu (8,188 m or 26,864 feet)	Ascent with Hans Kammerlander and Michael Dacher on a partially new route.
1984	Gasherbrum I (8,080 m or 26,510 feet), Gasherbrum II (8,034 m or 26,358 feet)	First traverse of two eight-thousanders without returning to base camp (with Hans Kammerlander).
1985	Annapurna (8,091 m or 26,545 feet), Dhaulagiri (8,167 m or 26,795 feet)	First ascent of Annapurna's unclimbed North-West Face. Both ascents with Hans Kammerlander.
1986	Makalu (8,485 m or 27,838 feet), Lhotse (8,516 m or 27,940 feet)	Makalu: Ascent with Hans Kammerlander and Friedl Mutschlechner, Lhotse: Ascent with Hans Kammerlander. Messner becomes the first person to climb all 14 eight-thousanders.

=== Other expeditions since 1970 ===
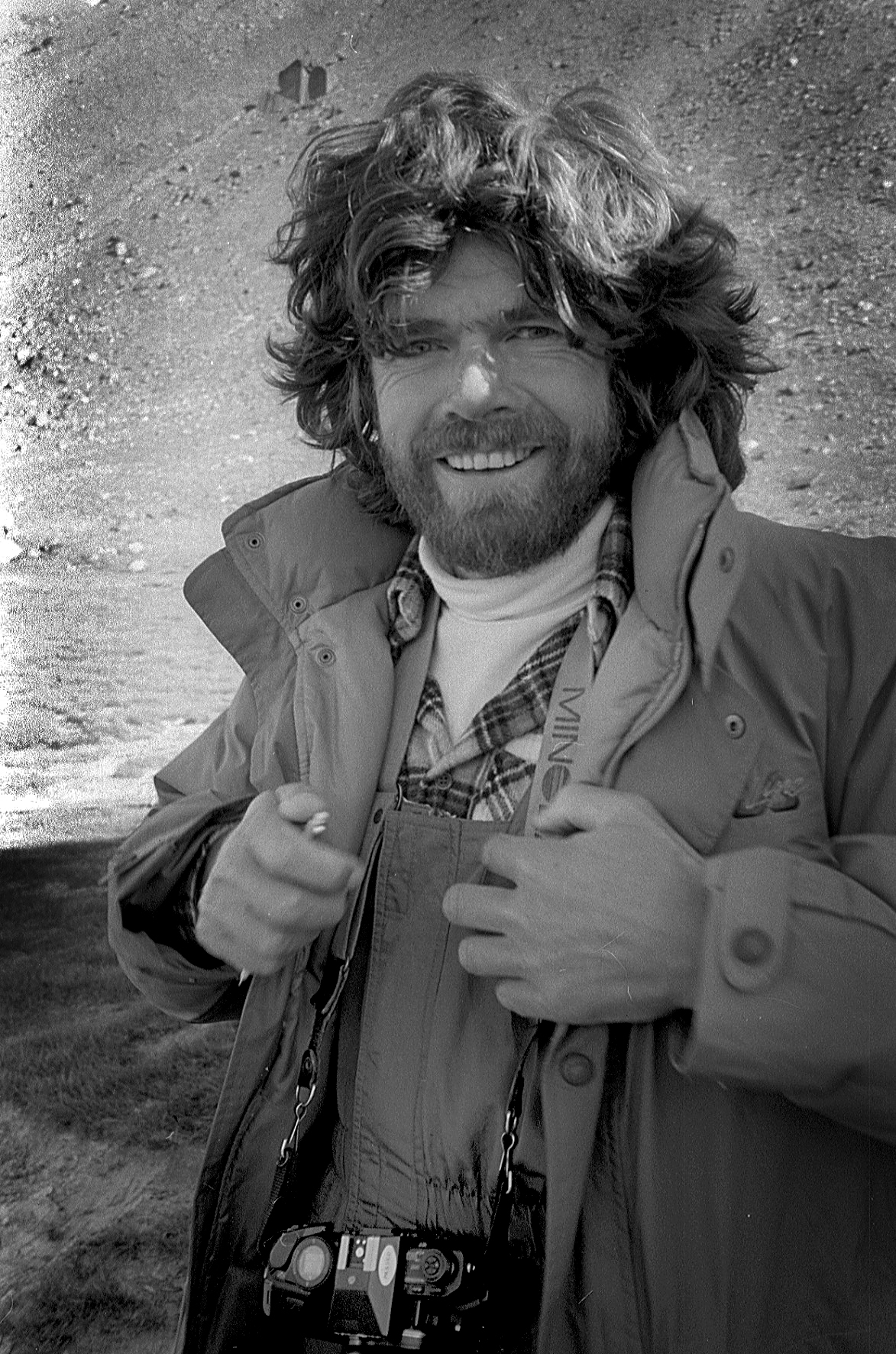
Reinhold Messner in 1985 in Pamir Mountains.

- 1971 – Journeys to the mountains of Iran, Nepal, New Guinea, Pakistan and East Africa;
- 1972 – Noshaq (7,492 m or 24,580 feet) in the Hindu Kush;
- 1973 – Marmolada West Pillar, first climb; Furchetta West Face, first climb;
- 1974 – Aconcagua south wall (6,959 m or 22,831 feet), partially new "South Tyrol Route"; Eiger North Face with Peter Habeler in 10 hours (a record that stood for 34 years, for a roped party);
- 1976 – Denali (6,193 m or 20,318 feet), "Face of the Midnight Sun", first climb;
- 1978 – Kilimanjaro (5,895 m or 19,341 feet), "Breach Wall", first climb;
- 1979 – Ama Dablam rescue attempt; first climbs in the Hoggar Mountains, Africa;
- 1981 – Chamlang (7,317 m or 24,006 feet) Centre Summit-North Face, first climb;
- 1984 – Double-Traverse of Gasherbrum II and I with Hans Kammerlander;
- 1985 – Tibet Transversale with Kailash exploration;
- 1986 – Crossing of East Tibet; Mount Vinson (4,897 m or 16,066 feet, Antarctic), on 3 December 1986, thus becoming the first person to complete Seven Summits without the use of supplemental oxygen on Mount Everest;
- 1987 – Bhutan trip; Pamir trip;
- 1988 – Yeti-Tibet solo expedition;
- 1989–1990 – Antarctic crossing (over the South Pole) on foot, 2,800-kilometre (1,700-mile) trek with Arved Fuchs;
- 1991 – Bhutan crossing (east-west); "Around South Tyrol" as a positioning exercise, where he was peripherally involved in the Ötzi find, being among the groups who inspected the mummy on-site the day after its initial discovery;
- 1992 – Ascent of Chimborazo (6,310 m or 20,700 feet); crossing of Taklamakan Desert in Xinjiang;
- 1993 – Trip to Dolpo, Mustang and Manang in Nepal; Greenland longitudinal crossing (diagonal) on foot, 2,200-kilometre (1,400-mile) trek;
- 1994 – Cleaning project in North India/Gangotri, Shivling region (6,543 m or 21,467 feet); to Ruwenzori (5,119 m or 16,795 feet), Uganda;
- 1995 – Arctic crossing (Siberia to Canada) failed; trip to Belukha (4,506 m or 14,783 feet), Altai Mountains/Siberia;
- 1996 – Trip through East Tibet and to Kailash.
- 1997 – Trip to Kham (East Tibet); small expedition into Karakoram; filming on the Ol Doinyo Lengai (holy mountain of the Maasai) in Tanzania
- 1998 – Trip to the Altai Mountains (Mongolia) and to Puna de Atacama (Andes)
- 1999 – Filming: San Francisco Peaks, Arizona (Holy mountain of Navajo); trip into the Thar Desert/India
- 2000 – Crossing of South Georgia on the Shackleton Route; Nanga Parbat Expedition; filming on Mount Fuji/Japan for the ZDF series Wohnungen der Götter (~"Homes of the Gods")
- 2001 – Dharamsala and foothills of the Himalayas/India; ZDF series Wohnungen der Götter on Gunung Agung/Bali
- 2002 – In the "International Year of the Mountains" visit by mountaineers into the Andes and ascent of Cotopaxi (5,897 m or 19,347 feet), Ecuador
- 2003 – Trekking to Mount Everest (fiftieth anniversary of the first successful climb); trip to Franz Joseph Land/Arctic; on 1 October opening of the "Günther Mountain School" in the Diamir Valley on Nanga Parbat/Pakistan
- 2004 – Longitudinal crossing of the Gobi Desert (Mongolia) on foot, about 2,000-kilometre (1,200-mile) trek
- 2005 – Trip to the Dyva Nomads in Mongolia; "time journey" around Nanga Parbat/Pakistan

== Climbs ==
=== Nanga Parbat ===
Messner made a total of five expeditions to Nanga Parbat. In 1970 and 1978 he reached the summit (in 1978 solo); in 1971, 1973 and 1977, he did not. In 1971 he was primarily looking for his brother's remains.

=== Rupal Face 1970 ===
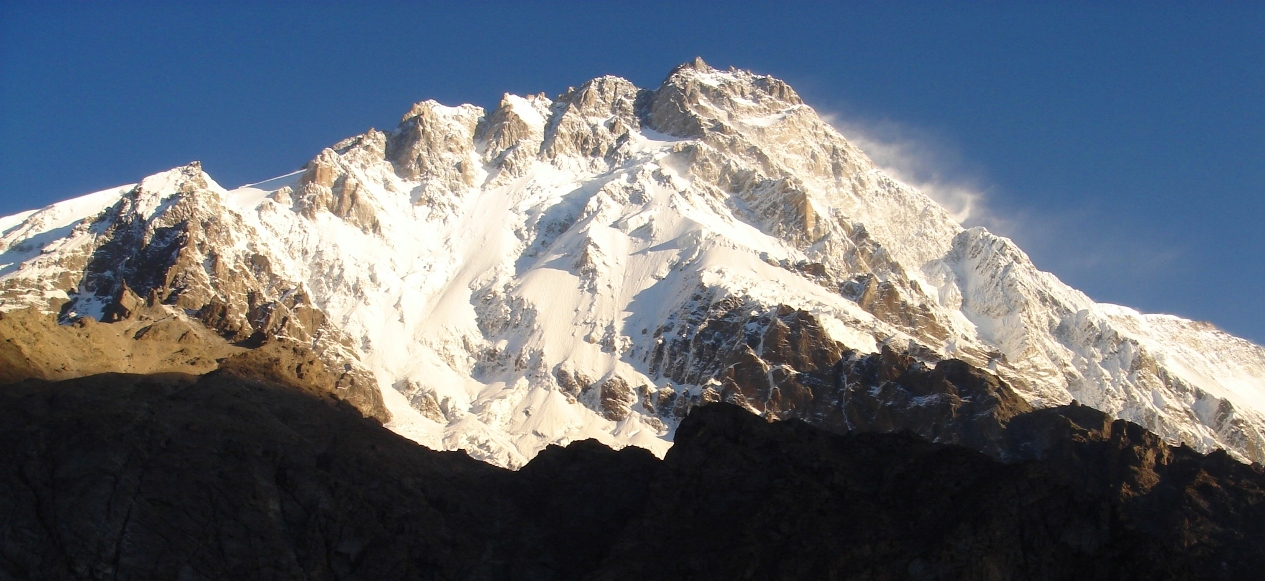
Rupal face of Nanga Parbat.

In May and June 1970, Messner took part in the Nanga Parbat South Face expedition led by Karl Herrligkoffer, the objective of which was to climb the as yet unclimbed Rupal Face, the highest rock and ice face in the world. Messner's brother, Günther, was also a member of the team. On the morning of 27 June, Messner was of the view that the weather would deteriorate rapidly, and set off alone from the last high-altitude camp. Surprisingly his brother climbed after him and caught up to him before the summit. By late afternoon, both had reached the summit of the mountain and had to pitch an emergency bivouac shelter without tent, sleeping bags and stoves because darkness was closing in.

The events that followed have been the subject of years of legal actions and disputes between former expedition members, and have still not been finally resolved. What is known now is that Reinhold and Günther Messner descended the Diamir Face, thereby achieving the first traverse of Nanga Parbat and second traverse of an eight-thousander after Mount Everest in 1963. Reinhold arrived in the valley six days later with severe frostbite, but survived. Günther, however died on the Diamir Face—according to Reinhold, on the same descent, during which they became further and further separated from each other. As a result, the time, place and exact cause of death are unknown. Messner said his brother had been swept away by an avalanche.

In June 2005, after an unusual heat wave on the mountain, the body of his brother was recovered on the Diamir Face, which seems to support Messner's account of how Günther died.

The drama was turned into a film Nanga Parbat (2010) by Joseph Vilsmaier, based on Messner's memories and without participation from the other former members of the expedition. Released in January 2010 in cinemas, the film was criticised by the other members of the team for telling only one side of the story.

Because of severe frostbite, especially on his feet—seven toes were amputated—Messner was not able to climb quite as well on rock after the 1970 expedition. He therefore turned his attention to higher mountains, where there was much more ice.

=== Solo climb in 1978 ===
On 9 August 1978, after three unsuccessful expeditions, Messner reached the summit of Nanga Parbat again via the Diamir Face.

=== Manaslu ===
In 1972, Messner succeeded in climbing Manaslu on what was then the unknown south face of the mountain, of which there were not even any pictures. From the last high-altitude camp he climbed with Frank Jäger, who turned back before reaching the summit. Shortly after Messner reached the summit, the weather changed and heavy fog and snow descended. Initially Messner became lost on the way down, but later, heading into the storm, found his way back to the camp, where Horst Fankhauser and Andi Schlick were waiting for him and Jäger. Jäger did not return, although his cries were heard from the camp. Orientation had become too difficult. Fankhauser and Schlick began to search for him that evening, but lost their way and sought shelter at first in a snow cave. Messner himself was no longer in a position to help the search. The following day, only Horst Fankhauser returned. Andi Schlick had left the snow cave during the night and disappeared. Thus, the expedition had to mourn the loss of two climbers. Messner was later criticised for having allowed Jäger go back down the mountain alone.

=== Gasherbrum I ===
Together with Peter Habeler, Messner made a second ascent of Gasherbrum I on 10 August 1975, becoming the first man ever to climb more than two eight-thousanders. It was the first time a mountaineering expedition succeeded in scaling an eight-thousander using alpine style climbing. Until that point, all fourteen 8000-meter peaks had been summited using the expedition style, though Hermann Buhl had earlier advocated "West Alpine Style" (similar to "capsule" style, with a smaller group relying on minimal fixed ropes).

Messner reached the summit again in 1984, this time together with Hans Kammerlander. This was achieved as part of a double ascent where, for the first time, two eight-thousander peaks (Gasherbrum I and II) were climbed without returning to base camp. Again, this was done in alpine style, i.e. without the pre-location of stores. Filmmaker Werner Herzog accompanied the climbers along the 150-kilometre (93 mi) approach to base camp, interviewing them extensively about why they were making the climb, if they could say; they could not. Messner became emotional on camera when he recalled having to tell his mother about his brother's death.

It took a week for the two climbers to summit both peaks and return to camp, after which Herzog interviewed them again. His documentary, The Dark Glow of the Mountains, with some footage the two climbers shot during the expedition on portable cameras, was released the following year.

=== Mount Everest ===
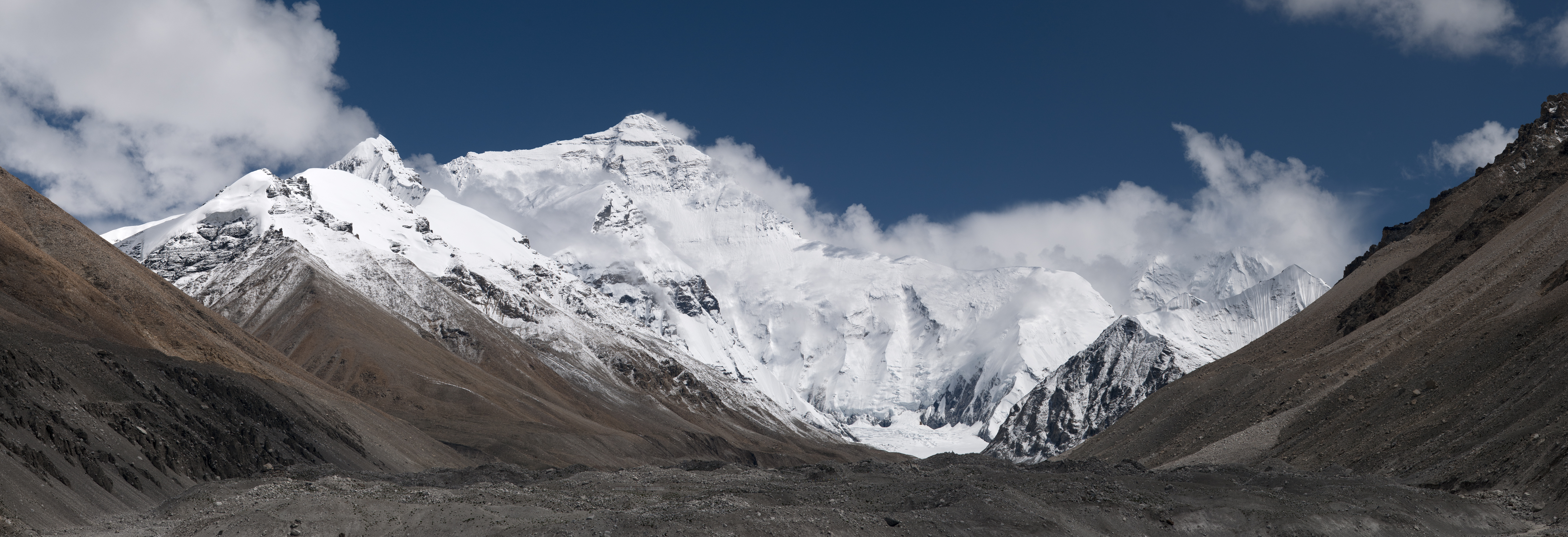
Mount Everest north face.

On 8 May 1978, Messner and Habeler reached the summit of Mount Everest, becoming the first men to climb it without using supplemental oxygen. Before this ascent, it was disputed whether this was possible at all. Messner and Habeler were members of an expedition led by Wolfgang Nairz along the southeast ridge to the summit. Also on this expedition was Reinhard Karl, the first German to reach the summit, albeit with the aid of supplemental oxygen.

Two years later, on 20 August 1980, Messner again stood atop the highest mountain in the world, without supplementary oxygen. For this solo climb, he chose the northeast ridge to the summit, where he crossed above the North Col in the North Face to the Norton Couloir and became the first man to climb through this steep gorge to the summit. Messner decided spontaneously during the ascent to use this route to bypass the exposed northeast ridge.

Messner's climb was considered a landmark achievement on par with the four-minute mile, with pioneering climber Tom Hornbein saying it "transformed mountaineering as we know it." Author Jon Krakauer calls Messner's 1980 ascent of Everest alone, without relying on oxygen, established camps, fixed ropes, or a support team, "still the greatest mountaineering feat of all time".

=== K2 ===
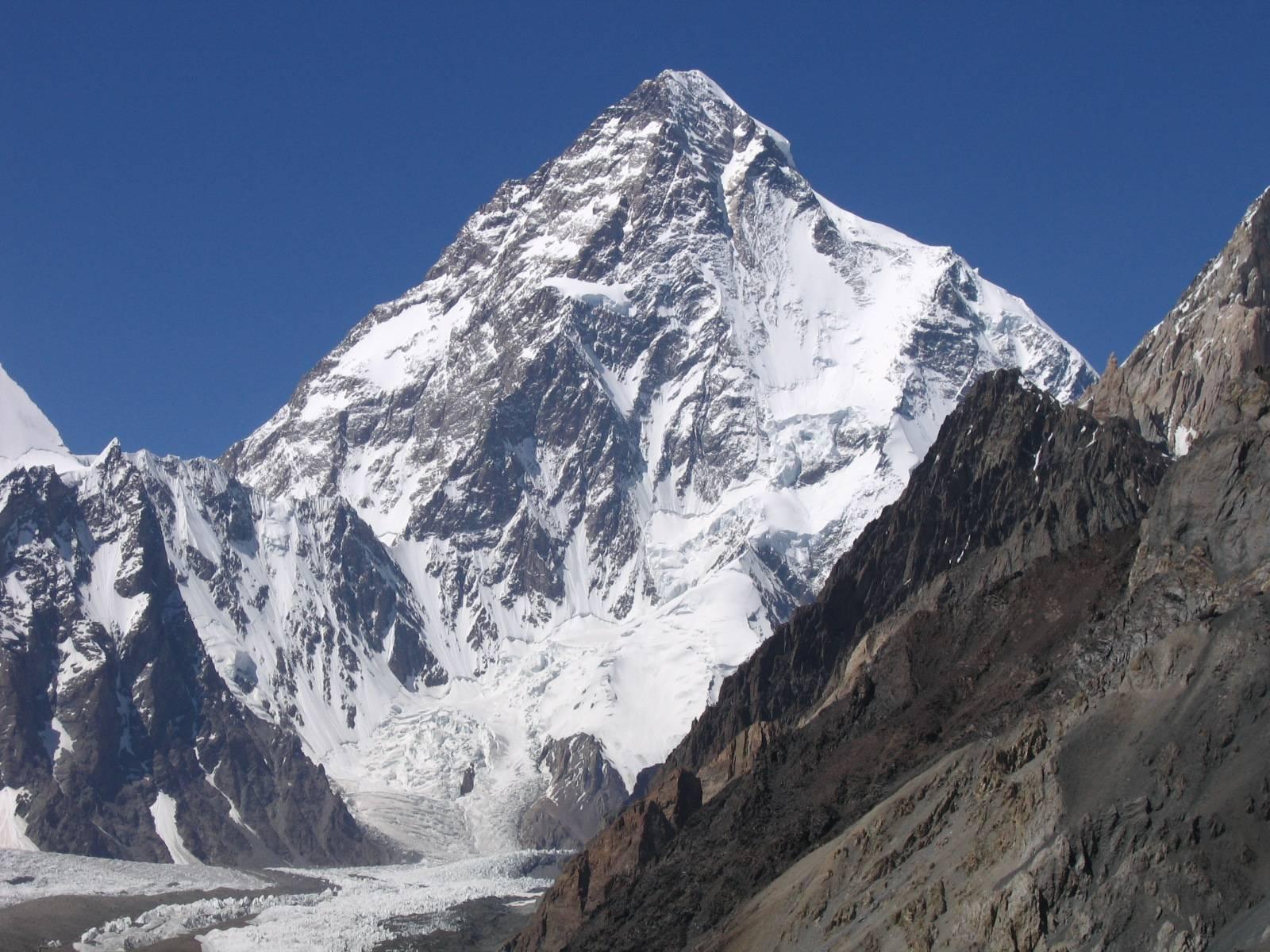
K2 seen from Concordia.

For 1979, Messner was planning to climb K2 on a new direct route through the South Face, which he called the "Magic Line". Headed by Messner, the small expedition consisted of six climbers: Italians Alessandro Gogna, Friedl Mutschlechner and Renato Casarotto; the Austrian, Robert Schauer; and Germans Michael Dacher, journalist, Jochen Hölzgen, and doctor Ursula Grether, who was injured during the approach and had to be carried to Askole by Messner and Mutschlechner. Because of avalanche danger on the original route and time lost on the approach, they decided to climb via the Abruzzi Spur. The route was equipped with fixed ropes and high-altitude camps, but no hauling equipment (Hochträger) or bottled oxygen was used. On 12 July, Messner and Dacher reached the summit; then the weather deteriorated and attempts by other members of the party failed.

=== Shishapangma ===
During his stay in Tibet as part of his Everest solo attempt, Messner explored Shishapangma. A year later, Messner, with Friedel Mutschlechner, Oswald Oelz, and Gerd Baur, set up a base camp on the north side. On 28 May, Messner and Mutschlechner reached the summit in very bad weather; part of the climb involving ski mountaineering.

=== Kangchenjunga ===
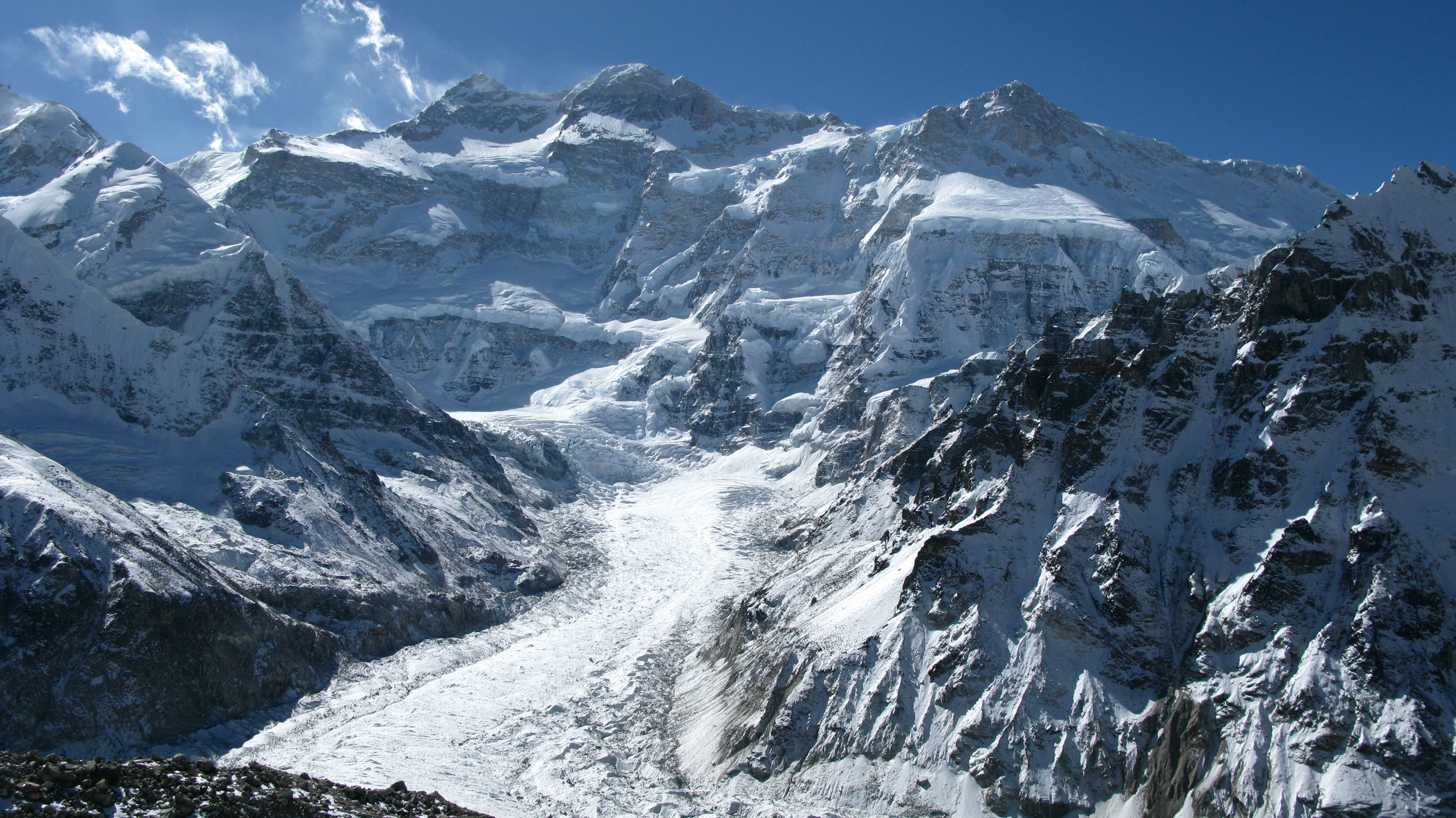
Kangchenjunga.

In 1982, Messner wanted to become the first climber ever to scale three eight-thousanders in one year. He planned to climb Kangchenjunga, then Gasherbrum II and Broad Peak.

Messner chose a new variation of the route up the north face. Because there was still a lot of snow, Messner and Mutschlechner made very slow progress. In addition, the difficulty of the climb forced the two mountaineers to use fixed ropes. Finally, on 6 May, Messner and Mutschlechner stood on the summit. There, Mutschlechner suffered frostbite to his hands, and later to his feet as well. While bivouacking during the descent, the tent tore away from Mutschlechner and Messner, and Messner also fell ill. He was suffering from amoebic liver abscess, making him very weak. He made it back to base camp only with Mutschlechner's help.

=== Gasherbrum II ===
After his ascent of Kangchenjunga, Mutschlechner flew back to Europe because his frostbite had to be treated and Messner needed rest. Thus the three mountains could not be climbed as planned. Messner was cured of his amoebic liver abscess and then travelled to Gasherbrum II, but could not use the new routes as planned. In any case, his climbing partners, Sher Khan and Nazir Sabir, would not have been strong enough. Nevertheless, all three reached the summit on 24 July in a storm. During the ascent, Messner discovered the body of a previously missing Austrian mountaineer, whom he buried two years later at the G I – G II traverse.

=== Broad Peak ===
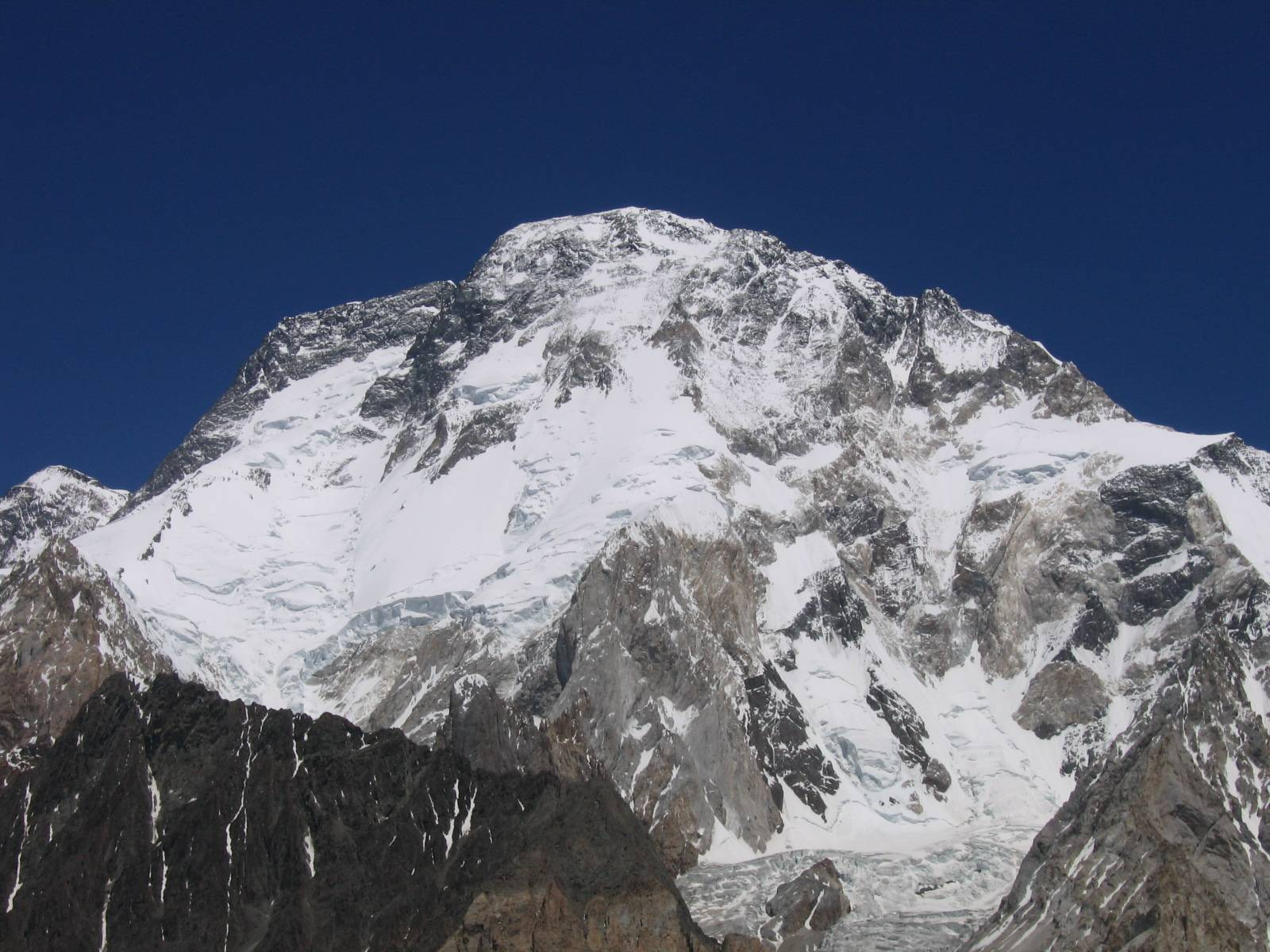
Broad Peak.

In 1982, Messner scaled Broad Peak, his third eight-thousander that year. At the time, he was the only person with a permit to climb this mountain; he came across Jerzy Kukuczka and Wojciech Kurtyka, who had permits to climb K2, but used its geographic proximity to climb Broad Peak illegally. In early descriptions of the ascent, Messner omitted this encounter, but he referred to it several years later. On 2 August, Messner was reunited with Nazir Sabir and Khan again on the summit. The three mountaineers had decamped and made for Broad Peak immediately after their ascent of Gasherbrum II. The climb was carried out with a variation from the normal route at the start.

=== Cho Oyu ===
In the winter of 1982–83, Messner attempted the first winter ascent of Cho Oyu. He reached an altitude of about 7,500 m (24,600 feet), when great masses of snow forced him to turn back. This expedition was his first with Hans Kammerlander. A few months later, on 5 May, he reached the summit via a partially new route together with Kammerlander and Michael Dacher.

=== Annapurna ===
In 1985, Messner topped out on Annapurna. Using a new route on the northwest face, he reached the summit with Kammerlander on 24 April. Also on the expedition were Reinhard Patscheider, Reinhard Schiestl and Swami Prem Darshano, who did not reach the summit. During Messner and Kammerlander's ascent, the weather was bad and they had to be assisted by the other three expedition members during the descent due to heavy snowfall.

=== Dhaulagiri ===
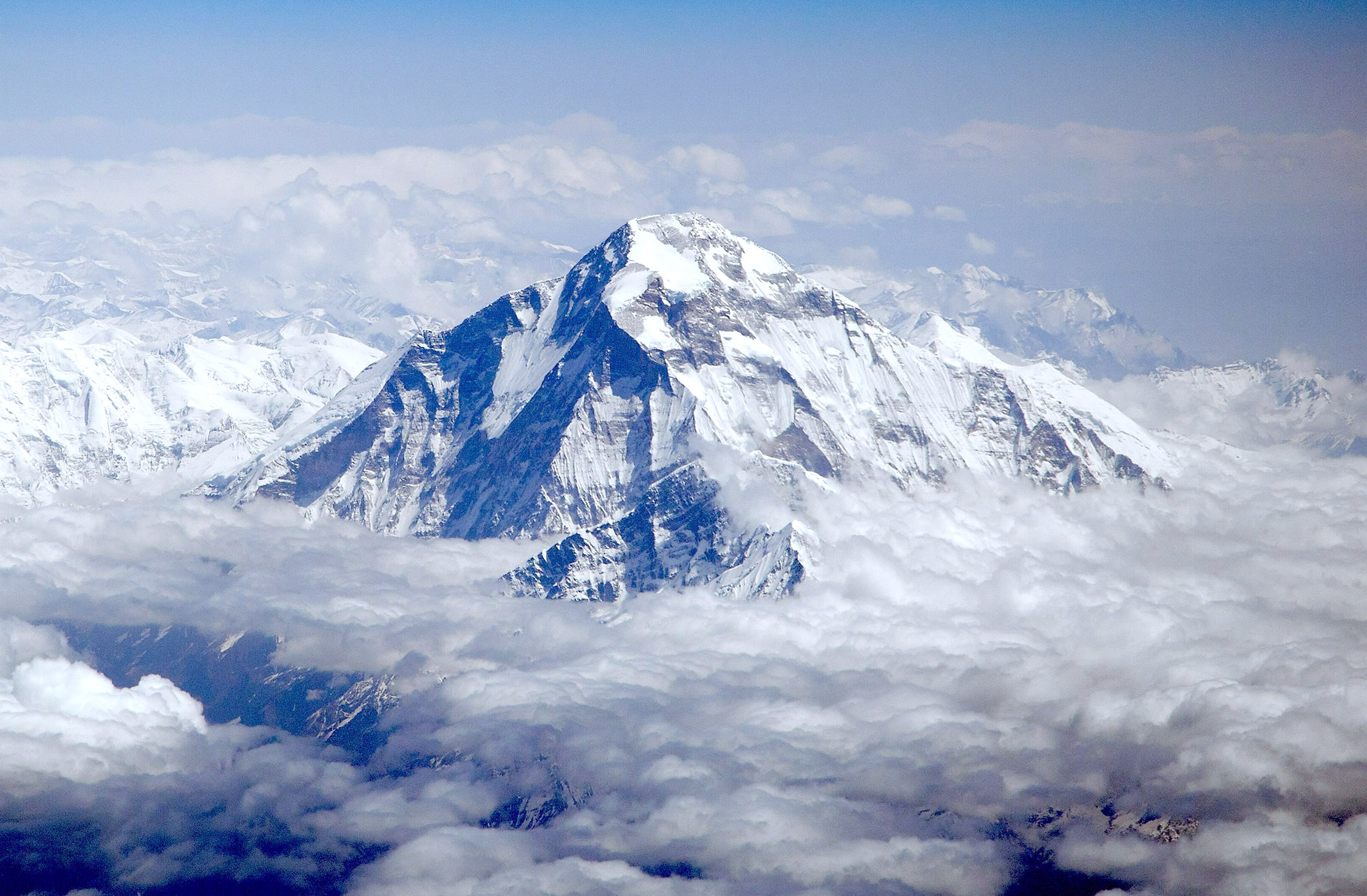
Messner's attempt on the summit in 1977 failed on Dhaulagiri's South Face.

Messner had already attempted Dhaulagiri in 1977 and 1984, unsuccessfully. In 1985 he finally summited. He climbed with Kammerlander up the normal route along the northeast ridge. After only three days of climbing they stood on the summit in a heavy storm on 15 May.

=== Makalu ===
Messner tried climbing Makalu four times. He failed in 1974 and 1981 on the South Face of the south-east ridge. In winter 1985–1986 he attempted the first winter ascent of Makalu via the normal route. Even this venture did not succeed. Not until February 2009 was Makalu successfully climbed in winter by Denis Urubko and Simone Moro.

In 1986, Messner returned and succeeded in reaching the summit using the normal route with Kammerlander and Mutschlechner. Although they had turned back twice during this expedition, they made the summit on the third attempt on 26 September. During this expedition, Messner witnessed the death of Marcel Rüedi, for whom the Makalu was his 9th eight-thousander. Rüedi was on the way back from the summit and was seen by Messner and the other climbers on the descent. Although he was making slow progress, he appeared to be safe. The tea for his reception had already been boiled when Rüedi disappeared behind a snow ridge and did not reappear. He was found dead a short time later.

=== Lhotse ===
Messner's last climb of an 8,000m peak was Lhotse in 1986. To reach the summit that year and before winter broke, they took a direct helicopter flight from the Makalu base camp to the Lhotse base camp. Messner and Kammerlander had to contend with a strong wind in the summit area. With his Lhotse climb, Messner became the first person to climb all eight-thousanders. Since this ascent, Messner has never climbed another eight-thousander.

In 1989, Messner led a European expedition to the South Face of the mountain. The aim was to forge a path up the as-yet-unclimbed face. Messner himself did not want to climb any more. The expedition was unsuccessful.

=== The Seven Summits ===
In 1985 Richard Bass first postulated and achieved the mountaineering challenge Seven Summits, climbing the highest peaks of each of the seven continents. Messner suggested another list (the Messner or Carstensz list) replacing Mount Kosciuszko with Indonesia's Puncak Jaya, or Carstensz Pyramid (4,884 m or 16,024 feet). From a mountaineering point of view the Messner list is the more challenging one. In May 1986 Pat Morrow became the first person to complete the Messner list, followed by Messner himself when he climbed Mount Vinson in December 1986 to become the second.

== World-first records ==
Messner is listed seven times in the Guinness Book of Records. All of his achievements are classed as "World's Firsts" (or "Historical Firsts"). A "World's First" is the highest category of any Guinness World Record, meaning the ownership of the title never expires. As of 2021, Messner is the second highest record holder of "World's Firsts" (after Icelandic oceanic rower Fiann Paul, who has 13). Messner's world firsts are:

- First ascent of Manaslu without supplementary oxygen
- First solo summit of Everest
- First ascent of Everest and K2 without supplementary oxygen
- First ascent of the top three highest mountains without supplementary oxygen
- First 8,000-metre mountain hat-trick (first man to climb more than two eight-thousanders)
- First ascent of Everest without supplementary oxygen
- First ascent of Gasherbrum I without supplementary oxygen
- First ascent of an 8000er in alpine style (Gasherbrum I)

Guinness World Records changed the status of First ascent of all fourteen 8000 metre plus peaks following research by German Himalayan chronicler, Eberhard Jurgalski, which suggested Messner did not reach the true summit of Annapurna in 1985.

== Record controversy ==
For nearly 37 years, Guinness World Records (GWR) recognized Messner as the first person to climb all 14 of the world's mountains over 8,000 m; starting in June 1970 and concluding on 16 October 1986. Messner, however, never claimed the record as many top mountaineers have stated they do not chase such records not only because that is not the purpose of their endeavors but also because of the unavoidable and natural imprecision in proving many of these records.

Nevertheless, on 18 September 2023, GWR stripped Messner of the record and awarded it to Ed Viesturs. Messner retorted: "I don't care if my name is in the Guinness World Records book. You cannot take a record I never claimed away from me."

GWR based their reclassification of the record holder on the decade-long analysis of Eberhard Jurgalski. Jurgalski, dubbed a "mountaineering consultant" or "mountain chronicler" by the media, claimed to have used photographic and GPS records to estimate the true summits of all 14 peaks. He apparently cross-checked these findings with the summit-related claims (including photographic evidence) of the individuals who summited these peaks. Jurgalski's estimates concluded that Messner, through no fault of his own, did not reach the true summit of at least three of the 14 peaks but that Viesturs was the first to do so. The difference in the claimed "true summit" and the "summit" supposedly reached by Messner was as little as a few meters.

Both Messner and Viesturs do not accept Jurgalski's estimates and other mountaineers have disputed Jurgalski's findings as well. Jurgalski has never climbed any of the peaks in question and his claimed expertise, methodologies, and findings have been criticized by the mountain climbing community. For example: mountains change over time, especially via the collapse of summit cornices, which could explain the differences in the summit reached 40 years ago and the ones measured today. Moreover, Jurgalski may have missed cultural nuances that only expert climbers were aware of prior to summiting a mountain climbed by very few. For instance, Viesturs honored locals' requests not to stand on the true summit of one of the 14 peaks, stopping just short out of respect for their beliefs, which would technically mean he never summited all 14 peaks either even though he could have.

On October 13, 2023, Jurgalski reversed key features of his findings, stating that true summit of some of the peaks is indeterminable and therefore a "summit zone" of up to ~200 meters is a more appropriate approximation of wherein the true summit may lie. As a consequence, Jurgalski stated that Messner is the true record holder "forever".

Ultimately, in response to Jurgalski and GWR, Viesturs stated: "I truly believe that Reinhold Messner was the first person to climb all 14 8000ers and should still be recognized as having done so…" and "Messner is still the record-holder."

Despite Jurgalski's retraction, Viestur's voluntary failure to reach one of the summits out of respect for local culture, and Viestur's proclamations that Messner is the true record holder, GWR maintains that Viesturs is the actual record holder.

== Messner Mountain Museum ==
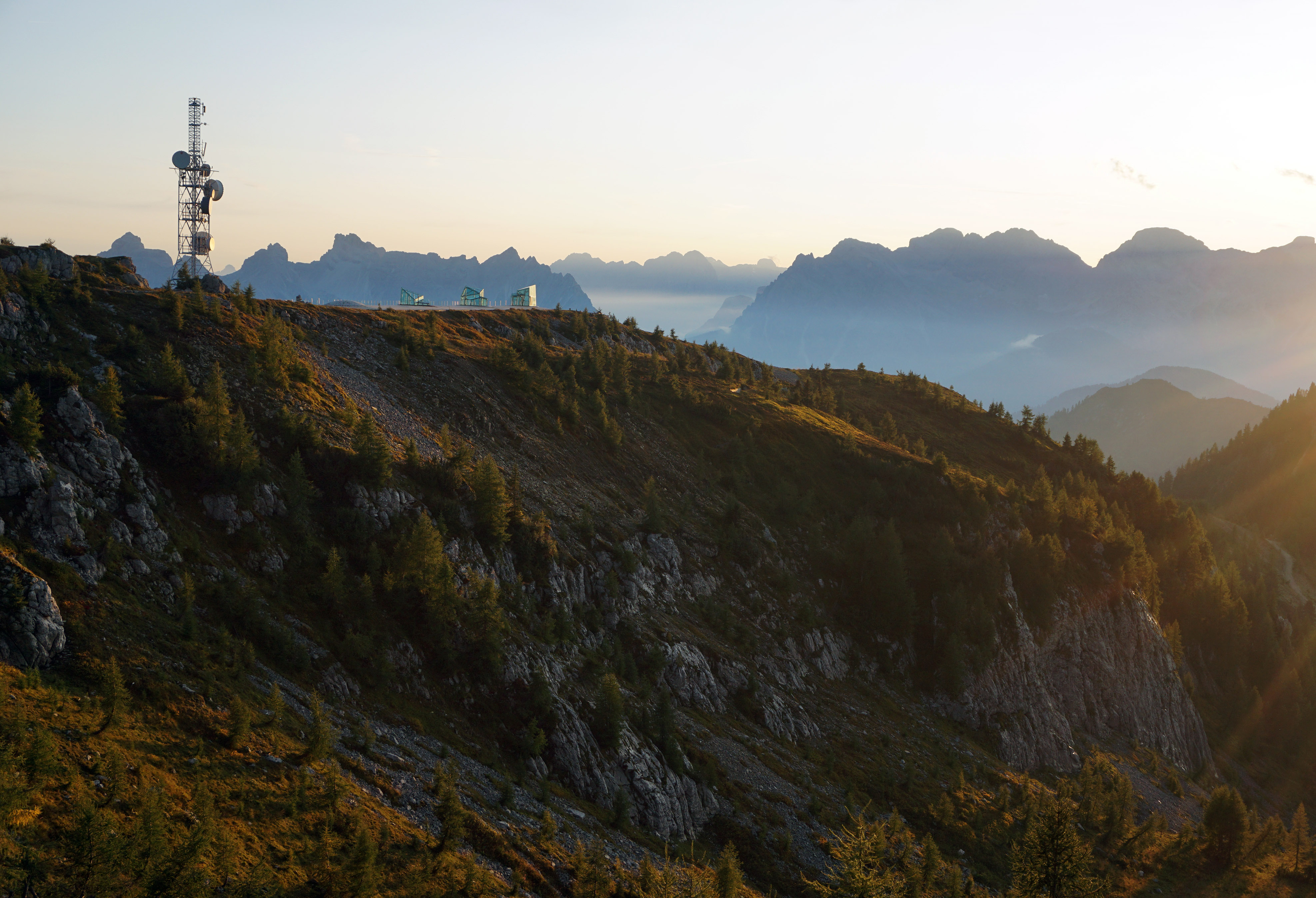
Messner Mountain Museum in Monte Rite, Dolomites.

In 2003 Messner started work on a project for a mountaineering museum. On 11 June 2006, the Messner Mountain Museum (MMM) opened, a museum that unites within one museum the stories of the growth and decline of mountains, culture in the Himalayan region and the history of South Tyrol.

The MMM consists of five or six locations:

- MMM Firmian at Sigmundskron Castle near Bozen is the centerpiece of the museum and concentrates on man's relationship with the mountains. Surrounded by peaks from the Schlern and the Texel range, the MMM Firmian provides visitors with a series of pathways, stairways, and towers containing displays that focus on the geology of the mountains, the religious significance of mountains in the lives of people, and the history of mountaineering and alpine tourism. The so-called white tower is dedicated to the history of the village and the struggle for the independence of South Tyrol.
- MMM Juval at Juval Castle in the Burggrafenamt in Vinschgau is dedicated to the "magic of the mountains", with an emphasis on mystical mountains, such as Mount Kailash or Ayers Rock and their religious significance. MMM Juval houses several art collections.
- MMM Dolomites, known as the Museum in the Clouds, is located at Monte Rite (2,181 m or 7,156 feet) between Pieve di Cadore and Cortina d'Ampezzo. Housed in an old fort, this museum is dedicated to the subject of rocks, particularly in the Dolomites, with exhibits focusing on the history of the formation of the Dolomites. The summit observation platform offers a 360° panorama of the surrounding Dolomites, with views toward Monte Schiara, Monte Agnèr, Monte Civetta, Marmolada, Monte Pelmo, Tofana di Rozes, Sorapis, Antelao, Marmarole.
- MMM Ortles at Sulden on the Ortler is dedicated to the theme of ice. This underground structure is situated at 1,900 m (6,200 feet) and focuses on the history of mountaineering on ice and the great glaciers of the world. The museum contains the world's largest collection of paintings of the Ortler, as well as ice-climbing gear from two centuries.
- MMM Ripa at Brunico Castle in South Tyrol is dedicated to the mountain peoples from Asia, Africa, South America and Europe, with emphasis on their cultures, religions, and tourism activities.
- MMM Corones, opened in July 2015 on the top of the Kronplatz mountain (Plan de Corones in Italian), is dedicated to traditional climbing.

== Political career ==
Reinhold Messner
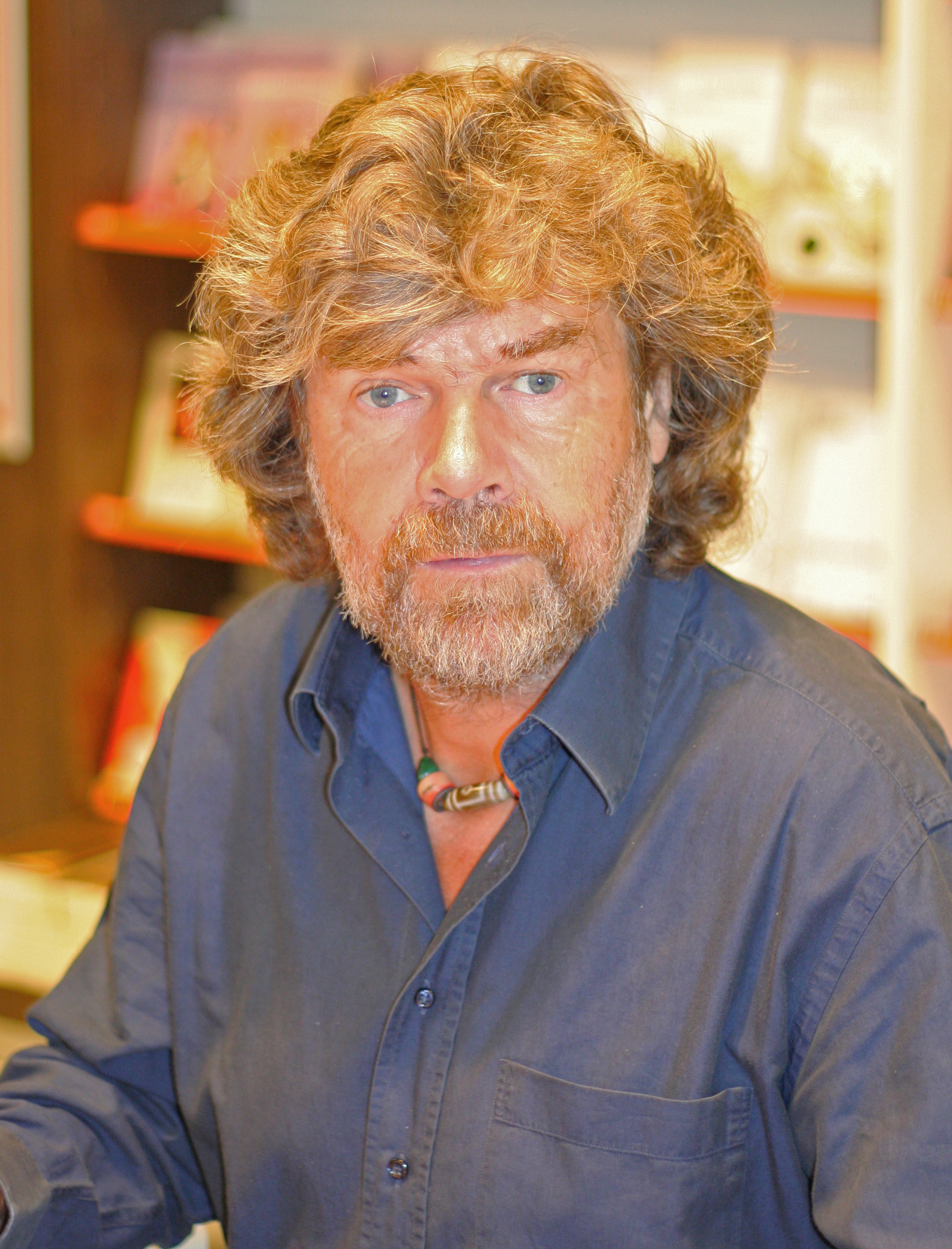

Member of the European Parliament for North-East Italy
- In office 20 July 1999 – 19 July 2004

Personal details
- Born: 17 September 1944 (age 82) Brixen, Italy
- Party: Greens of South Tyrol
- Other political affiliations: Federation of the Greens

In 1999, Messner was elected Member of the European Parliament for the Federation of the Greens (FdV), the Italian green party, receiving more than 20,000 votes in the European election. He fully served his term until 2004, when he retired from politics.

Messner was officially a member of South Tyrolean Greens, a regionalist and ecologist political party active only in South Tyrol, which de facto acts as a regional branch of the FdV.

=== Electoral history ===
Election	House	Constituency	Party	Votes	Result
1999	European Parliament	North-East Italy	FdV	20,291	Elected

== Personal life ==
From 1973 until 1978, Messner was married to Uschi Demeter. With his partner, Canadian photographer Nena Holguin, he has a daughter, Làyla Messner, born in 1981. On 31 July 2009, he married his long-time girlfriend Sabine Stehle, a textile designer from Vienna, with whom he has three children. They divorced in 2019. In late May 2021, Messner married Diane Schumacher, a 41-year-old Luxembourgish woman living in Munich, at the town hall in Kastelbell-Tschars near his home in South Tyrol.

== In media ==
- The Dark Glow of the Mountains (Gasherbrum – Der leuchtende Berg), a 1985 Werner Herzog television documentary
- Portrait of a Snow Lion, a BBC/France3 1992 documentary on Messner; part 4 of the series The Climbers
- Messner, a 2002 feature documentary about Messner by Les Guthman
- Lissi und der wilde Kaiser, an animated comedy movie from 2007 by Michael Herbig that ends with a photo of the Yeti with his new buddy, Reinhold Messner
- Nanga Parbat, a 2010 film based on Messner's achievements
- Messner, a 2012 documentary film about Messner's life and personality, directed by Andreas Nickel
- 14 Peaks: Nothing Is Impossible, a 2021 Netflix documentary film about Nirmal Purja and his mountaineering team's world record breaking ascent of the 14 highest mountains in the world. Reinhold Messner provides commentary in several interview segments. The New York Times described his contribution to the film as "the alpine legend Reinhold Messner waxing beautifully existential".
- The Alpinist, a 2021 documentary film with commentary by Messner

Ben Folds Five named their 1999 alt-rock album The Unauthorized Biography of Reinhold Messner without being aware of the real Messner at the time; a school friend of drummer Darren Jessee suggested using the name on fake ID's.

== See also ==
- List of climbers

== Selected bibliography (English translations) ==
- The Crystal Horizon: Everest – The First Solo Ascent. Seattle: Mountaineers Books. 1989. ISBN 978-0-89886-574-5.
- Free Spirit: A Climber's Life. Seattle: Mountaineers Books. 1998. ISBN 978-0-89886-573-8.
- All Fourteen 8,000ers. Mountaineers Books. 1999. ISBN 978-0-89886-660-5.
- My Quest for the Yeti: Confronting the Himalayas' Deepest Mystery. New York: St. Martin's Press. 2000. ISBN 978-0-312-20394-8.
- The Big Walls: From the North Face of the Eiger to the South Face of Dhaulagiri. Seattle: Mountaineers Books. 2001. ISBN 978-0-89886-844-9.
- Moving Mountains: Lessons on Life and Leadership. Provo: Executive Excellence. 2001. ISBN 978-1-890009-90-8.
- The Second Death of George Mallory: The Enigma and Spirit of Mount Everest. Translated by Carruthers, Tim. New York: St. Martin's Griffin. 2002. ISBN 978-0-312-27075-9.
- The Naked Mountain. Seattle, WA, US: Mountaineers Books. 2003. ISBN 978-0-89886-959-0.
- My Life at the Limit. Seattle, WA, US: Mountaineers Books. 2014. ISBN 978-1-59485-852-9.
- Against the Wind: Reflections on a Self-Determined Life. Seattle, WA, US: Mountaineers Books. 2025. ISBN 978-1-68051-818-4.

== Sources ==
- Wetzler, Brad (October 2002). "Reinhold Don't Care What You Think". Outside Magazine. Archived from the original on 22 September 2010.
- Krakauer, Jon (1997). Into Thin Air. New York: Villard Books. ISBN 978-0385494786. OCLC 42967338.
- https://guinnessworldrecords.com/world-records/746531-first-true-summit-ascent-of-the-8-000ers

== Interviews ==
- Gaia Symphony Documentary series (Japanese production).
- Reinhold Messner Biography and Interview on American Academy of Achievement.

Awards
Preceded by New Zealand national rugby union team	Princess of Asturias Award for Sports (with Krzysztof Wielicki); 2018	Succeeded by Lindsey Vonn
Preceded by n/a	Golden Plate Award of the American Academy of Achievement; 1987	Succeeded by n/a
