= Arved Fuchs =

German polar explorer and writer (born 1953)

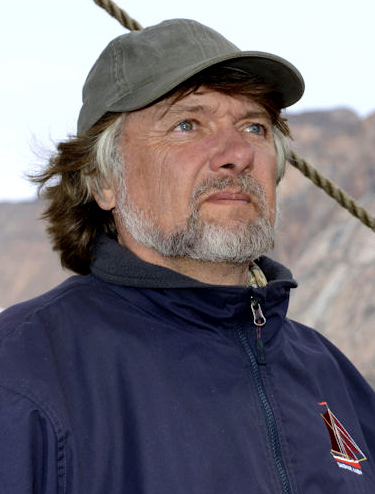
- Born: 26 April 1953 (age 71); Bad Bramstedt, West Germany
- Occupation(s): Polar explorer, writer
- Awards: Order of Merit of the Federal Republic of Germany (2017)

Arved Fuchs (born 26 April 1953) is a German polar explorer and writer.

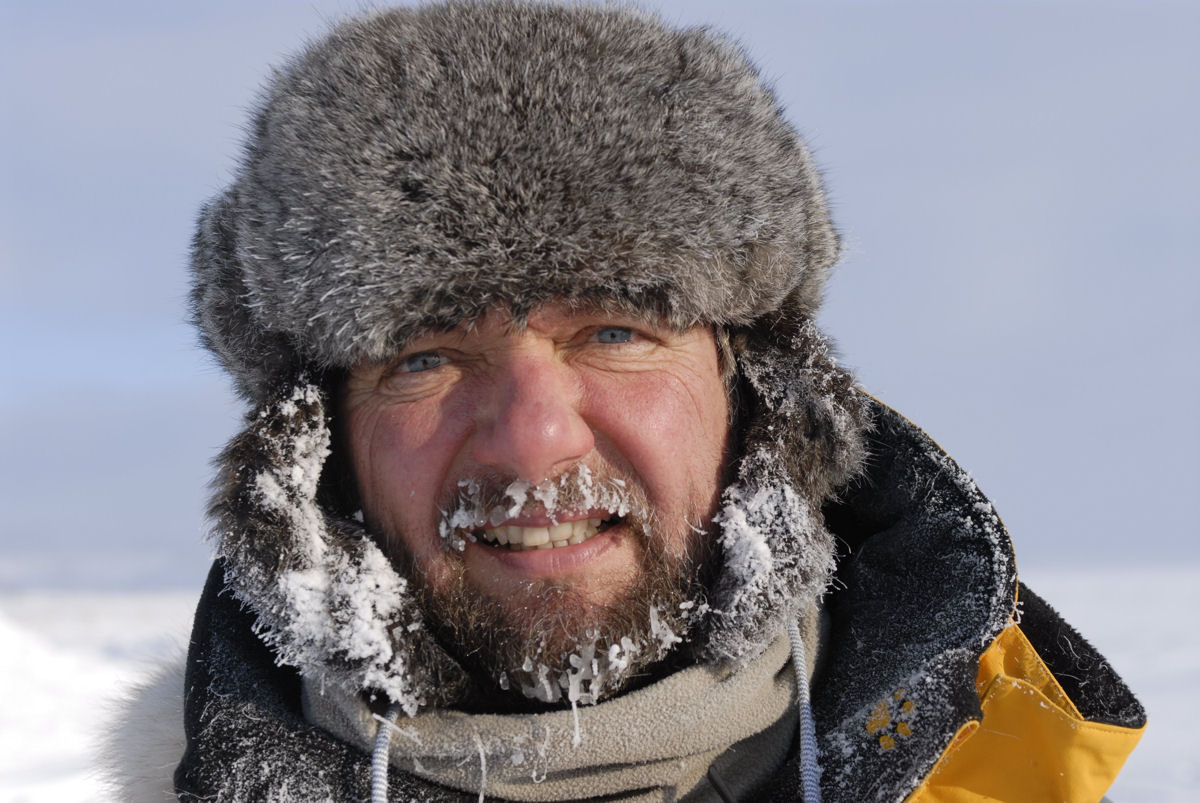
Fuchs in 2006

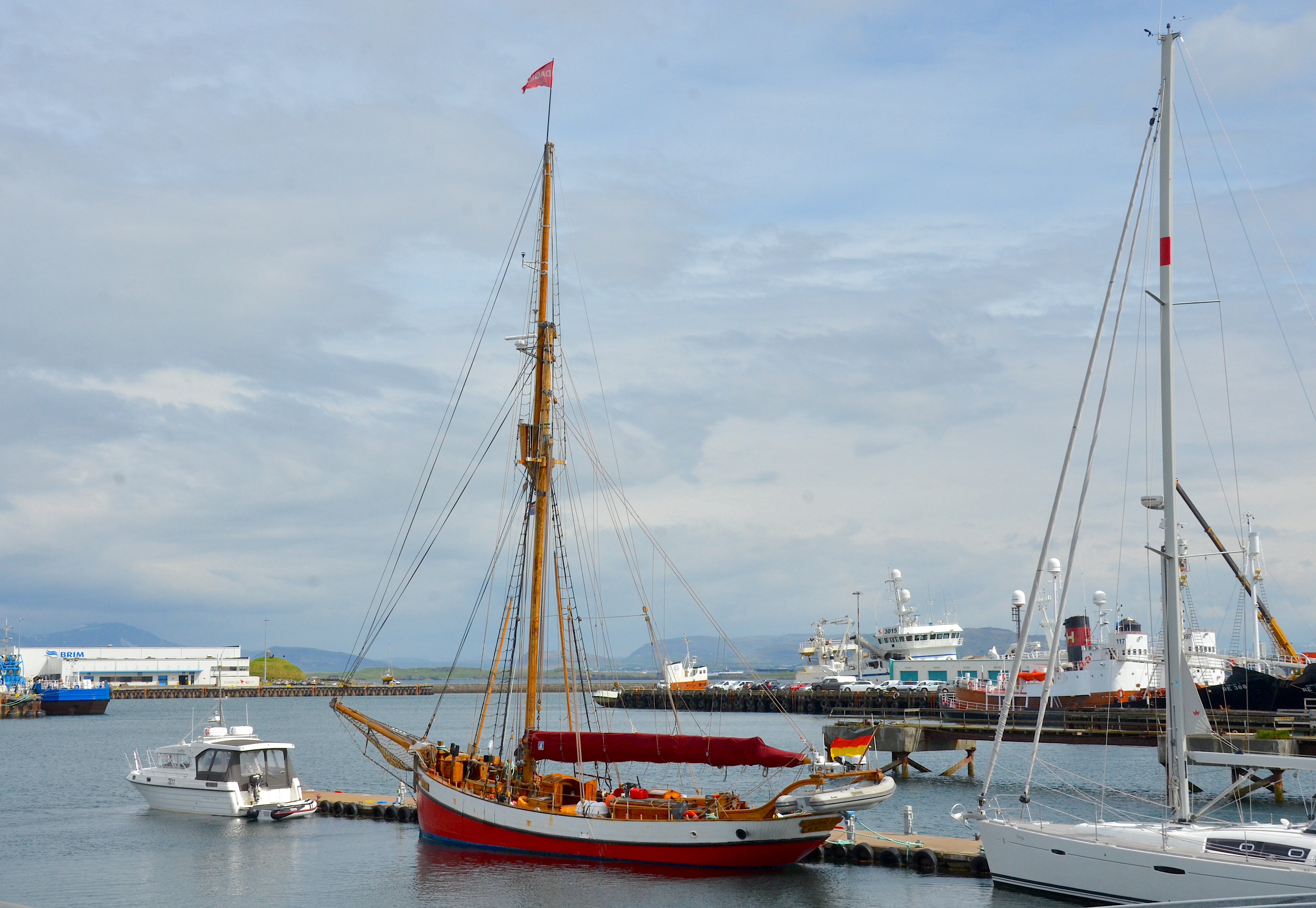
Sailing boat Dagmar Aaen

On 30 December 1989, Fuchs and Reinhold Messner were the first to reach the South Pole with neither animal nor motorised help, using skis and a parasail. That made him the first person to reach both poles by foot within one year.

Many of his expeditions have taken place on the water, such as his failed attempt to sail around the North Pole on a traditional sailing boat (1991–1994). This boat, Dagmar Aaen, is still used by Fuchs on his current expeditions.

In 2000, Fuchs led an expedition to recreate Ernest Shackleton's desperate sea journey in the James Caird from Elephant Island to South Georgia, and the subsequent land crossing of that island.

In October 2017, Fuchs was awarded the Order of Merit of the Federal Republic of Germany for his merits to the protection of the environment.

== Publications ==
- In Shackleton's wake. Translated by Sokolinsky, M. Dobbs Ferry: Sheridan House. 2001. ISBN 9781574091380.
