= Gaia Symphony =

- Country of origin: Japan
- No. of episodes: 9

Original release
- Release: 1992 – 2021

Gaia Symphony is a documentary film series directed by Jin Tatsumura. The series revolves around the Gaia hypothesis. The series has nine episodes. Each episode examines a small number of extraordinary people who somehow relate to the central theme. Some of the people examined are notable, including Reinhold Messner (episode 1) and Jane Goodall (episode 4). Created originally in the Japanese language, there are English versions available.

== Episodes ==
The first episode was released in 1992:

- Episode 1 (1992)
  - Shigeo Nozawa
  - Reinhold Messner
  - Daphne Sheldrick
  - Russell Schweickart
- Episode 2 (1995)
  - Jacques Mayol
  - The 14th Dalai Lama
  - Prof. Frank Drake
  - Hatsume Sato
- Episode 3 (1997)
  - Michio Hoshino
  - George Dyson
  - Freeman Dyson
  - Nainoa Thompson
- Episode 4 (2001) For the Children Who Will Be Born and Grow in the 21st Century
  - James Lovelock
  - Gerry Lopez
  - Jane Goodall
  - Bokunen Naka
- Episode 5 (2004) Everything is Connected
  - Ervin Laszlo
  - Akiko Ishigaki
- Episode 6 (2007) Every Existence Resonates Together
  - Ravi Shankar
  - Kelly Yost
  - Roger Payne
- Episode 7 (2010)
  - Andrew Weil
  - Takako Takano
  - Greg LeMond
