= The Dark Glow of the Mountains =

1985 film

- Messner at the summit of Gasherbrum II
- Genre: Documentary
- Written by: Werner Herzog
- Directed by: Werner Herzog
- Starring: Reinhold Messner; Hans Kammerlander; Werner Herzog
- Narrated by: Werner Herzog
- Music by: Popol Vuh
- Country of origin: West Germany
- Original language: German

Production
- Producers: Werner Herzog; Manfred Nägele
- Cinematography: Rainer Klausmann
- Editor: Maximiliane Mainka
- Running time: 45 minutes
- Production companies: Süddeutscher Rundfunk (SDR); Werner Herzog Filmproduktion

Original release
- Release: April 3, 1985

The Dark Glow of the Mountains (German: Gasherbrum – Der leuchtende Berg) is a TV documentary made in 1985 by German filmmaker Werner Herzog. It is about an expedition made by mountain climber Reinhold Messner and his partner Hans Kammerlander to climb Gasherbrum II and Gasherbrum I all in one trip without returning to base camp. The film is not so much concerned with showing the climb itself or giving guidelines on mountaineering, but seeks to reveal the inner motivation of the climbers.

== Background ==
The film has been compared to other films by Herzog such as Fitzcarraldo and Cave of Forgotten Dreams, for its interest in mountains and the supernatural.

== Production ==
The climb itself was filmed with an 8 mm camera so as to keep as close to the two protagonists as possible.

== Reception ==
The film bearing Herzog's trademark of a very frontal approach of its subject has retrospectively received very positive reviews acquiring the status of a cult classic.
