= Michio Hoshino =

Japanese photographer

- 星野 道夫
- Born: September 27, 1952; Ichikawa, Chiba, Japan
- Died: August 8, 1996 (aged 43); Kurile Lake, Kamchatka, Russia
- Education: Faculty of Economics, Keio University (completed); Wildlife management program, University of Alaska Fairbanks (dropped out)
- Occupation: Nature photographer
- Years active: 1973 – 1996

Michio Hoshino (星野 道夫, Hoshino Michio; September 27, 1952 – August 8, 1996) was a Japanese-born nature photographer. He originally hailed from Ichikawa, Chiba Prefecture. Considered one of the most accomplished nature photographers of his era and compared to Ansel Adams, Hoshino specialized in photographing Alaskan wildlife until he was killed by a brown bear while on assignment in Kurilskoye Lake, Russia, in 1996.

== Biography ==
=== Career ===
Michio's interest in Alaska began at the age of 19, when he bought a photo book showing the village of Shishmaref. Wanting to see it for himself, he sent a letter to the village's mayor, who replied six months later inviting him to visit. The following summer, he spent three months there, taking photographs and helping to catch fish. At that point he decided to become a photographer. Later he graduated from Keio University, for two years he worked as an assistant to wildlife photographer Kojo Tanaka. In 1978, Hoshino enrolled at the University of Alaska Fairbanks where he studied wildlife management.

He was famous among the colleagues for his shots made from a very close position to the animals, including bears. However, Hoshino considered himself a photographer of nature in a bigger sense, including indigenous people and their interactions with environments. In search of perfect shot, he endured exhausting expeditions, including living for a month on a glacier. As recalled by a friend and colleague Kim Heacox, Hoshino respected nature and all beings so much that he ‘practically bowed before clicking the shutter’.

=== Death ===
Hoshino died after being mauled by a brown bear in Kurile Lake on the Kamchatka Peninsula in eastern Russia on August 8, 1996. In early August 1996, Hoshino flew to the South Kamchatka Federal Wildlife Reserve accompanied by three Japanese cameramen who were making a documentary film about the photographer. The local bear expert and a researcher of the Kamchatka Nature Management Department of the Pacific Institute of Geography Igor Revenko was assigned to guide the group. They settled at a remote hunting cordon at Cape Siyushk (‘Travyanoy’) which territory at the time wasn’t fenced with a wire. The group didn’t have weapons except for false fires. Despite his extensive experience of living in the wild, Hoshino disregarded basic safety rules and pitched his tent next to the hunting lodge where the rest of the team were sleeping.

For several days the work was going on well, however, soon in the vicinity of the cordon appeared a new large bear with atypical behavior. The bear didn’t fear people and kept fishing calmly when they approached. This allowed Hoshino to shoot him from a close distance, however Revenko noticed that the bear was showing signs of aggression during the photo shoot, becoming nervous, angry and even trying to approach the group. Revenko warned Hoshino and offered him to move into the house for the night, but the photographer refused. During the night, a bear approached the tent, unmistakably identified (probably by the breathing of a sleeping person) where the man's head was, and killed him with a single blow through the canvas. Then he pulled the body out through the hole in the tent and dragged it into the bushes nearby. Despite all the attempts of the group, he was not scared by the false fires and shouts and ate its prey a few dozen meters from the lodge.

In the morning, Revenko took a boat to the KamchatNIRO observation station, from where sent a message about the tragedy to the Reserve's management. A helicopter with representatives of the Kronotsky Reserve and several hunters immediately flew to Travyanoy. The armed group was headed by Mosolov, a senior researcher of the reserve at that time. The helicopter hovered over the bear, which did not leave Michio's remains. The predator did not try to flee, but made aggressive lunges towards the aircraft. The bear was shot from the air. A later necropsy revealed human body parts in its stomach.

Explanations as to why Hoshino refused to sleep in the lodge vary. A colleague photographer Nick Jans recalled that Hoshino only smiled at warnings and was completely sure that ‘all creatures would sense his own good intentions and respond in kind’. Meanwhile, the helicopter pilots said that Michio Hoshino refused to participate in the drinking party at the lodge and, unable to endure the snoring of the "representative of the reserve", according to their version of the state inspector, went to sleep in the tent. Later Russian wildlife photographer and environmental inspector Igor Shpilenok explained in his blog that the bear was food-conditioned by some irresponsible photographers and filmmakers who worked on the spot before Hoshino's arrival.

A photoshopped photo of a bear entering a tent was spread on the Internet as ‘the last photo that Michio Hoshino took before he was mauled to death’. First of all, Hoshino was killed in the night and it was dark outside. Secondly, he was mauled by a Kamchatka brown bear, and the fake photo shows a grizzly. The photo was entered into the Worth1000 photoshop competition, in which the theme was "hoax last photo taken before death".

== Hoshino's photobooks ==
- Grizzly. San Francisco: Chronicle, 1987. ISBN 0-87701-431-0.
- The Grizzly Bear Family Book. North-South Books, 1997. ISBN 1-55858-701-2. For young readers.
- Hoshino's Alaska. San Francisco: Chronicle, 2007. ISBN 978-0-8118-5651-5.
- Moose. San Francisco: Chronicle, 1988. Hardback ISBN 0-87701-503-1. Paperback ISBN 0-87701-494-9.

== Memory ==
A memorial plaque was put up at the site of the photographer's death.

A memorial totem pole was raised in Sitka, Alaska, on August 8, 2008 (the 12-year anniversary of Hoshino's death), in honor of his work. Relatives and witnesses from Japan, including his widow, Naoko, attended the ceremony. Hoshino's wife Naoko and son Shoma survive him.

In August 2021, Hoshino was honored by the Alaska Legislature in a citation that recognized his “breathtaking photos of Alaska’s wildlife and scenery”. The widow attended the ceremony and accepted the honorary certificate.

Lynn Schooler's book The Blue Bear relates the story of the author's friendship with Hoshino, a man he admired greatly for his skill as a photographer and his humanity. Schooler is a wilderness guide who became a photographer in his own right under Hoshino's tutelage. Another book, The Only Kayak by Kim Heacox, describes Hoshino's journeys to Glacier Bay as well as his own close personal friendship with Hoshino.

== Awards ==
- 1996 — Anima Award;
- 1990 — Kimura Ihei Award.

== Interviews ==
- Interview with Lynn Schooler about The Blue Bear
- Gaia Symphony Documentary series (Japanese production).

== Sources ==
- Krechmar, Michail (2020). Мохнатый бог [Furry God]. Litres. ISBN 978-5-902479-37-6.
