= Messner (film) =

2012 German film directed by Andreas Nickel

- Directed by: Andreas Nickel
- Written by: Andreas Nickel
- Produced by: Andreas Nickel
- Cinematography: Denis Ducroz
- Edited by: Hans Horn; Lodur Tettenborn
- Music by: Wolfgang Gleixner; Peter Horn; Andrej Melita
- Production company: Explorer Media
- Release date: 27 September 2012
- Running time: 108 minutes
- Country: Germany
- Language: German

Messner is a 2012 German documentary film directed by Andreas Nickel. It is about the life and personality of the South Tyrolean mountaineer Reinhold Messner and consists of archive material, interviews and scenes with actors. It was released in German cinemas on 27 September 2012.
