= Michael Dacher =

German mountaineer (1933 - 1994)

Michael Dacher (21 August 1933 – 3 December 1994) was a German mountain climber. In 1979 he and Reinhold Messner climbed the K2 in record time and without oxygen equipment.

A primary school in Khadambas, a village 80 km east of Kathmandu in Nepal, has been named after him.

Dacher was born in Peiting.

== Climbs ==
=== Europe ===
- 1950 Geiselstein in the Ammer Mountains
- 1951 Geiselstein south face, south cut, east cut, first five-day tour
- 1952 Fleischbank, southeast face, Bauernpredigtstuhl-Alte Westwand
- 1953 Fleischbank-Südostverschneidung, Mauk, west face (Buhlroute), Schüsselkarspitze, southeast face, Große Zinne-Norwand (Comici)
- 1954 Predigtstuhl – direct west face (4th ascent) Große Zinne, north face (Comici), 4th solo ascent
- 1955 Torre di Valgrande, northwest face (Carlessoführe), many solo tours in local Ammer Mountains
- 1956/57 first West Alpine journey, Westliche Zinne, north face (Cassin)
- 1959 Piz Badile, northeast face
- 1960 Rotwand, southwest face (Brandler-Hasse)
- 1961 Große Zinne, direct north face
- 1962 Grandes Jorasses-Walkerpfeiler, first ice tour
- 1963 Ortler, north face (Schmid)
- 1964 Matterhorn, north face
- 1965/68 Oberreintaldom-Gondaverschneidung und Schießlerführe, Berggeisttum-Cukrowskiführe, Montblanc-Brenvaflanke, Blatière, west face (Brown), Sass-Maor, east face (Solleder), Piz de Ciavàzes-south face (Schubert)
- 1969 Eiger, north face (Heckmair), Mont Maudit southeast arête
- 1971/72 Trollryggen, northeast face (Norway)
- 1974 Cengalo, northwest pillar
- 1976 Rotwand, southwest face (Eisenstecken)
- 1978 Triolet, north face, Grubenkarspitze, west face (Klaus Werner Führe) Karwendel

=== Asia ===
- 1973 Hindu Kush expedition, failed owing to equipment losses
- 1975 Yalung Kang (8,438 m) (Kangchenjunga West Peak), second ascent
- 1977 Lhotse (8,516 m) im Khumbu Himalayas, without supplemental oxygen
- 1979 K2 (8,611 m) im Karakoram with Reinhold Messner; Dacher was the first German on the K2
- 1980 Shishapangma (8,046 m) in Tibet
- 1981 Nanga Parbat (8,125 m) in Pakistan
- 1982 Hidden Peak (8,080 m), first ascent of a variation in the north face
- 1983 Cho Oyu (8,188 m) from the southwest in Alpine style
- 1984 Manaslu (8,163 m)
- 1985 Dhaulagiri (8,167 m), failed owing to sickness of a colleague
- 1986 Broad Peak (8,047 m)
- 1987 Everest (8,848 m), failed owing to storms
- 1987 Gasherbrum II (8,035 m)
- 1988 Makalu (8,485 m) failed owing to hurricane winds
- 1990 Dhaulagiri (8,167 m) international expedition, failed
- 1991 Everest (8,848 m) attempt
- 1993 Mustagh Ata (7,546 m) climbed with skis
- 1993 Everest (8,848 m), expedition attempt

=== South America ===
- 1992 Aconcagua (6,962 m), Dacher is expedition leader

=== Greenland ===
- 1970 Greenland, inland ice crossing from west to east (Nansen route) with Franz Martin
