= Peter Habeler =

Austrian mountaineer

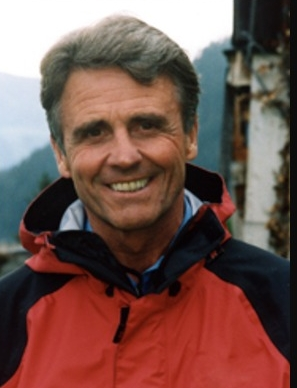
- Habeler in 2017

Personal information
- Nationality: Austrian
- Born: 22 July 1942 (age 84) Mayrhofen, Tyrol-Vorarlberg, Austria
- Occupations: Mountaineer, ski instructor

Climbing career
- Major ascents: Mount Everest; Cho Oyu; Nanga Parbat; Kangchenjunga; Hidden Peak; Yerupaja Chico; Eiger north face
- Known for: Mount Everest first ascent without supplemental oxygen

Peter Habeler (born 22 July 1942) is an Austrian mountaineer. He was born in Mayrhofen, Austria. He developed an interest in mountain climbing at age six.

Among his accomplishments as a mountaineer are his first ascents in the Rocky Mountains. He was also the first European to take part in big wall climbing in Yosemite National Park.

He began climbing with Reinhold Messner in 1969. Several accomplishments in mountaineering followed. The most notable event was the first ascent of Mount Everest without supplemental oxygen on 8 May 1978 together with Messner, which was previously thought to be impossible. A year after his climb on Everest he published Lonely Victory ("Der einsame Sieg". Author: Eberhard Fuchs) in 1978. Habeler set further records by descending from the summit to the South Col in only one hour and climbing the North Face of the Eiger in ten hours.

Other eight-thousanders (mountains over 8,000 meters) that Habeler has summited are Cho Oyu, Nanga Parbat, Kangchenjunga and Gasherbrum I. He has also climbed Yerupaja Chico (6089 m) in Peru's Cordillera Huayhuash. The ascent of Gasherbrum I was made with Messner in 1975, Alpine-style in three days, and is seen by some as ushering in a new era of Alpine-style ascents of eight-thousanders, in contrast to the "siege" tactics which had largely prevailed to this time. It was the first time an eight-thousander had been climbed Alpine-style. Habeler attempted to climb Everest again in 2000 but failed due to fluid in his lungs.

Habeler became a skiing instructor at age 21 and founded the Peter Habeler Ski and Mountaineering School in his hometown of Mayrhofen, Austria. The school is now run by his son, though Habeler still teaches on occasion.

At age 74, he repeated an ascent on The Eiger's north face with David Lama.
