= Cho Oyu =

6th-highest mountain on Earth

- Nepali: चोयु Standard Tibetan: ཇོ་བོ་དབུ་ཡ
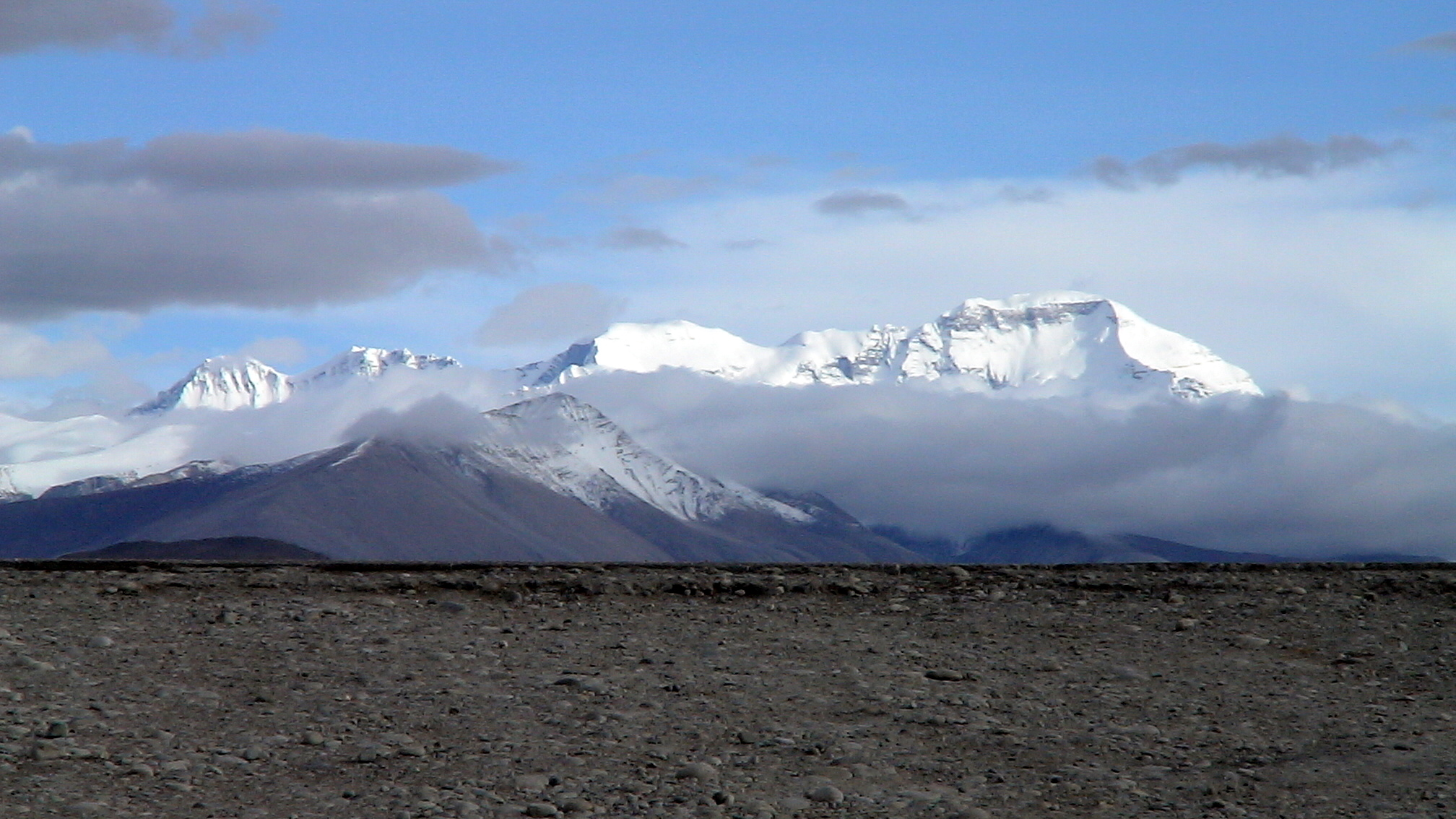
- View of Cho Oyu via Tingri

Highest point
- Elevation: 8,188 m (26,864 ft); Ranked 6th
- Prominence: 2,340 m (7,680 ft)
- Listing: Eight-thousander; Ultra
- Coordinates: 28°05′39″N 86°39′39″E

Naming
- English translation: Turquoise Goddess
- Language of name: Tibetan

Geography
- The major peaks (not mountains) above 7,500 m (24,600 ft) height in Himalayas, rank identified in Himalayas alone (not the world). Legend: 1：Mount Everest; 2：Kangchenjunga; 3：Lhotse; 4：Yalung Kang, Kanchenjunga West; 5：Makalu; 6：Kangchenjunga South; 7：Kangchenjunga Central; 8：Cho Oyu; 9：Dhaulagiri; 10：Manaslu (Kutang); 11：Nanga Parbat (Diamer); 12：Annapurna; 13：Shishapangma (Shishasbangma, Xixiabangma); 14：Manaslu East; 15：Annapurna East Peak; 16： Gyachung Kang; 17：Annapurna II; 18：Tenzing Peak (Ngojumba Kang, Ngozumpa Kang, Ngojumba Ri); 19：Kangbachen; 20：Himalchuli (Himal Chuli); 21：Ngadi Chuli (Peak 29, Dakura, Dakum, Dunapurna); 22：Nuptse (Nubtse); 23：Nanda Devi; 24：Chomo Lonzo (Chomolonzo, Chomolönzo, Chomo Lönzo, Jomolönzo, Lhamalangcho); 25：Namcha Barwa (Namchabarwa); 26：Zemu Kang (Zemu Gap Peak); 27：Kamet; 28：Dhaulagiri II; 29：Ngojumba Kang II; 30：Dhaulagiri III; 31：Kumbhakarna Mountain (Mount Kumbhakarna, Jannu); 32：Gurla Mandhata (Naimona'nyi, Namu Nan); 33：Hillary Peak (Ngojumba Kang III); 34：Molamenqing (Phola Gangchen); 35：Dhaulagiri IV; 36：Annapurna Fang; 37：Silver Crag; 38：Kangbachen Southwest; 39：Gangkhar Puensum (Gangkar Punsum); 40：Annapurna III; 41：Himalchuli West; 42：Annapurna IV; 43：Kula Kangri; 44：Liankang Kangri (Gangkhar Puensum North, Liangkang Kangri); 45：Ngadi Chuli South; Location in Province No. 1, Nepal and Tibet Autonomous Region, China
- Location: Nepal (Province No. 1)–China (Tibet)
- Parent range: Mahalangur Himal, Himalayas

Climbing
- First ascent: October 19, 1954 by Herbert Tichy, Joseph Jöchler, Pasang Dawa Lama (First winter ascent 12 February 1985 Maciej Berbeka and Maciej Pawlikowski)
- Easiest route: snow/ice/glacier climb

Cho Oyu (Nepali: चोयु; Tibetan: ཇོ་བོ་དབུ་ཡ; Chinese: 卓奥友峰) is the sixth-highest mountain in the world at 8,188 metres (26,864 ft) above sea level. Cho Oyu means 'Turquoise Goddess' in Tibetan. The mountain is the westernmost major peak of the Khumbu sub-section of the Mahalangur Himalaya 20 km (12 mi) west of Mount Everest. The mountain stands on the China–Nepal border, between the Tibet Autonomous Region and Koshi Province.

Just a few kilometres west of Cho Oyu is Nangpa La (5,716 m or 18,753 ft), a glaciated pass that serves as the main trading route between the Tibetans and the Khumbu's Sherpas. This pass separates the Khumbu and Rolwaling Himalayas. Due to its proximity to this pass and the generally moderate slopes of the standard northwest ridge route, Cho Oyu is considered the easiest 8,000 metre peak to climb. It is a popular objective for professionally guided parties.

== Height ==
Cho Oyu's height was originally measured at 26,750 feet (8,150 m) and at the time of the first ascent it was considered the 7th highest mountain on earth, after Dhaulagiri at 8,167 metres (26,795 ft) (Manaslu, now 8,156 metres (26,759 ft), was also estimated lower at 26,658 feet (8,125 m)). A 1984 estimate of 8,201 metres (26,906 ft) made it move up to sixth place. New measurements made in 1996 by the Government of Nepal Survey Department and the Finnish Meteorological Institute in preparation for the Nepal Topographic Maps put the height at 8,188 m, one remarkably similar to the 26,867 feet (8,189 m) used by Edmund Hillary in his 1955 book High Adventure.

== Climbing history ==
Cho Oyu was first attempted in 1952 by an expedition organised and financed by the Joint Himalayan Committee of Great Britain as preparation for an attempt on Mount Everest the following year. The expedition was led by Eric Shipton and included Edmund Hillary, Tom Bourdillon and George Lowe. A foray by Hillary and Lowe was stopped due to technical difficulties and avalanche danger at an ice cliff above 6,650 m (21,820 ft) and a report of Chinese troops a short distance across the border influenced Shipton to retreat from the mountain rather than continue to attempt to summit.

The mountain was first climbed on October 19, 1954, via the north-west ridge by Herbert Tichy, Joseph Jöchler and Sherpa Pasang Dawa Lama of an Austrian expedition. Cho Oyu was the fifth eight-thousander to be climbed, after Annapurna in June 1950, Mount Everest in May 1953, Nanga Parbat in July 1953 and K2 in July 1954. Until the ascent of Mount Everest by Reinhold Messner and Peter Habeler in 1978, this was the highest peak climbed without supplemental oxygen.

Cho Oyu is considered the easiest eight-thousander, (Note: Of the fourteen mountains surpassing the magic number 8000 metres in height, it is considered the easiest one to climb, and only the highest, Everest, has had more ascents.) with the lowest death-summit ratio (1/25th of Annapurna's). It is the second most climbed eight-thousander after Everest (whose height makes it the most popular), and has over four times the ascents of the third most popular eight-thousander, Gasherbrum II. It is marketed as a "trekking peak", achievable for climbers with high fitness, but low mountaineering experience. It has a broadly flat summit plateau with no cairn (the traditional prayer flags on Cho Oyu's summit plateau do not mark the "technical" summit), (Note: Many people who climb Cho Oyu in Tibet stop at a set of prayer flags with views of Everest and believe they’ve reached the top, unaware they still have to walk for 15 minutes across the summit plateau until they can see the Gokyo Lakes in Nepal.) which can be a source of confusion, and debate, amongst climbers (see Elizabeth Hawley). (Note: Miss Hawley uses the “did you see Everest” as her standard question, I have mentioned this to her as well. I have summitted Cho Oyu 4 times and will be heading for my fifth this coming season. Each time I have watched the Koreans and Japanese go only to where they can see Everest, not the summit, because they know this is what will be asked.)

== View ==
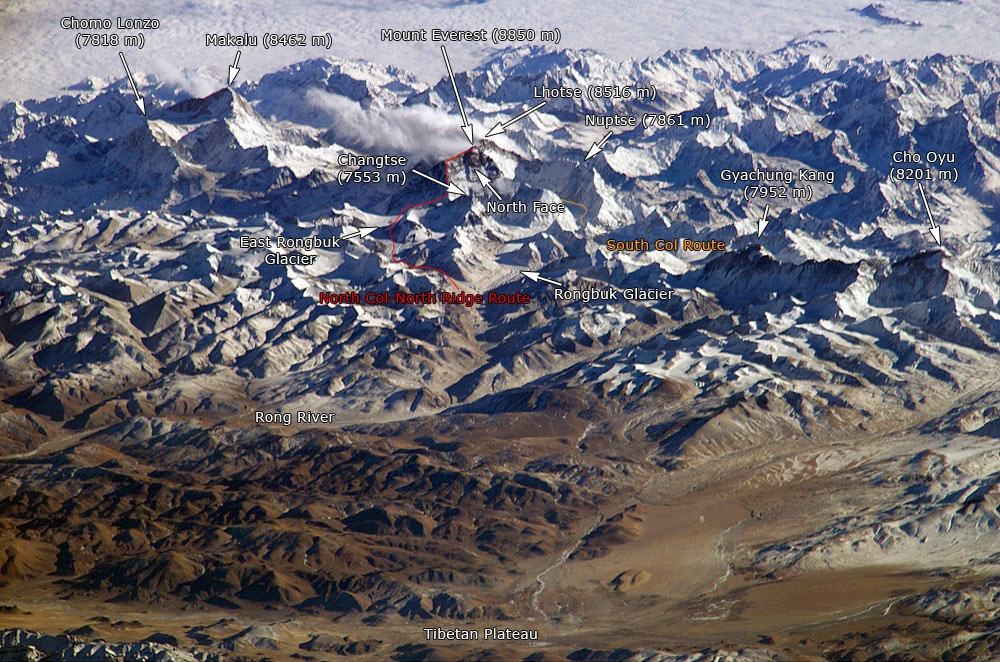

Southern and northern climbing routes as seen from the International Space Station. (The names on the photo are links to corresponding pages.)

=== Timeline ===
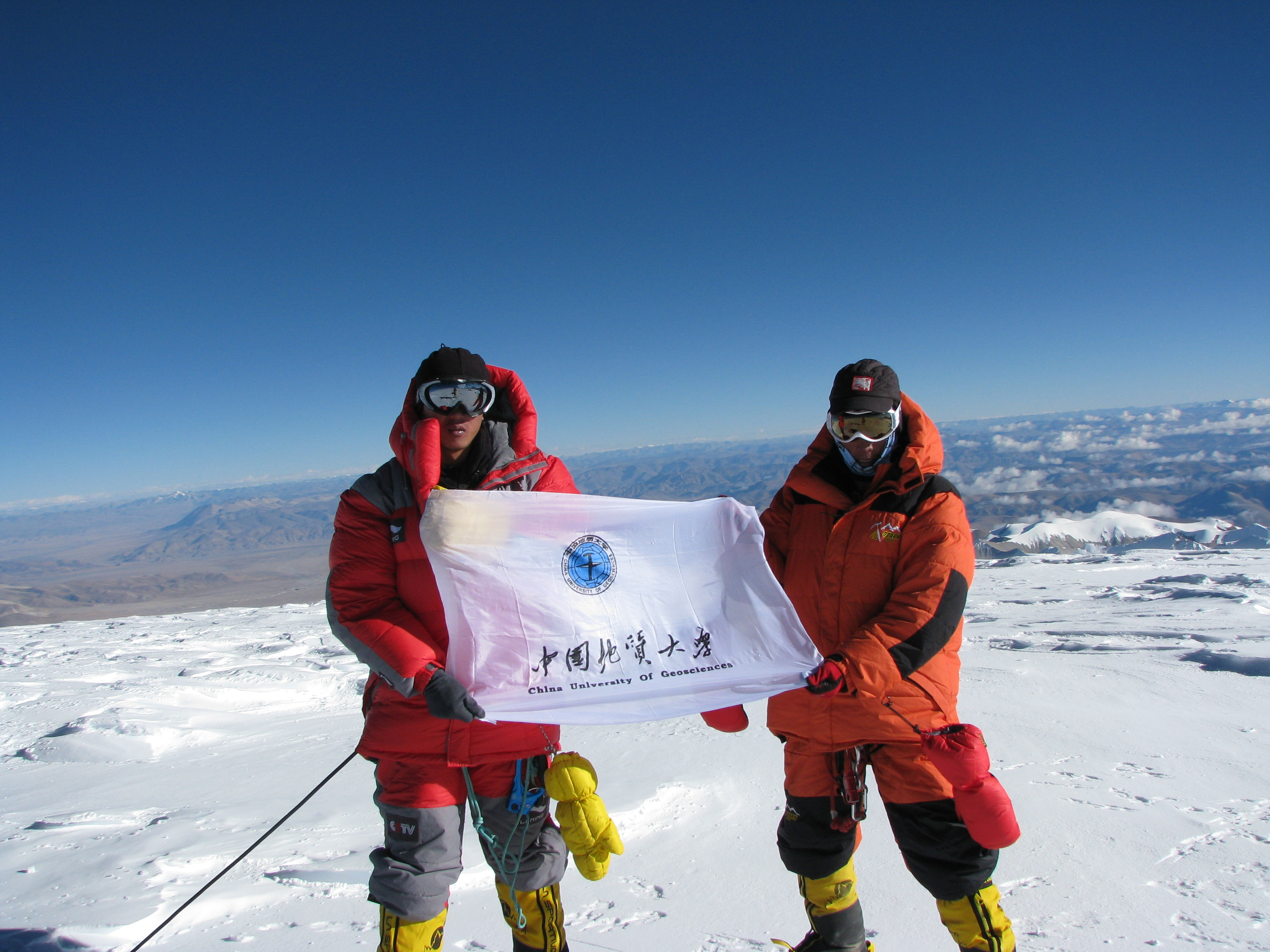
Ascent by a team from China University of Geosciences (Wuhan) on 2 October 2008

- 1952 First reconnaissance of north-west face by Edmund Hillary and party.
- 1954 First ascent by Austrians Joseph Jöchler and Herbert Tichy, and Pasang Dawa Lama (Nepal)
- 1958 Second ascent of the peak, by an Indian expedition. Sherpa Pasang Dawa Lama reaches the peak for the second time. First death on Cho Oyu.
- 1959 Four members are killed in an avalanche during a failed international women's expedition.
- 1964 A controversial third ascent by a German expedition as there is no proof of reaching the summit. Two mountaineers die of exhaustion in camp 4 at 7,600 m (24,930 ft).
- 1978 Edi Koblmüller and Alois Furtner of Austria summit via the extremely difficult southeast face.
- 1983 Reinhold Messner succeeds on his fourth attempt, with Hans Kammerlander and Michael Dacher.
- 1984 Věra Komárková (USA) and Dina Štěrbová (Czechoslovakia) become the first women to climb Cho Oyu. Štěrbová is also the first woman from Czechoslovakia to climb an 8,000er.
- 1985 On February 12, Poles Maciej Berbeka and Maciej Pawlikowski make the first winter ascent via a new route on the southeast face. It is the only winter ascent on an eight-thousander made on a new route and the first winter ascent without additional oxygen support. The ascent was repeated three days later by Andrzej Heinrich and Jerzy Kukuczka, with Kukuczka setting an additional record for climbing two eight-thousanders during the same winter, as he had earlier climbed Dhaulagiri.
- 1988 On November 2, a Slovenian expedition consisting of Iztok Tomazin, Roman Robas, Blaž Jereb, Rado Nadvešnik, Marko Prezelj and Jože Rozman reach the summit via the never before climbed north face.
- 1993 Marianne Chapuisat becomes the first woman to summit an eight thousander in the winter season when she summits Cho Oyu on February 10, 1993.
- 1994 On May 13 Carlos Carsolio sets a world record speed ascent from base camp to summit, ascending in 18 hours and 45 minutes.
- 1994 First solo ascent via the South West face by Yasushi Yamanoi.
- 2000 Russian-Finnish expedition of nine climbers summitted the top, but two of them disappeared in the attempt and were presumed dead.
- 2004 Second summit by a double amputee (Mark Inglis)
- 2007 Second Indian ascent. Expedition led by Abhilekh Singh Virdi.
- 2009 Clifton Maloney, husband of US Representative Carolyn Maloney and at that time the oldest American to summit an eight-thousander, died at age 71 after summiting on 25 September. His final words were "I’m the happiest man in the world. I’ve just summited a beautiful mountain."
- 2011 Dutch climber Ronald Naar dies after becoming unwell at 8,000 m (26,250 ft).
- 2017 Valery Rozov BASE jumped off Cho Oyu in 2017 from 7,700 metres (25,250 ft)

== See also ==
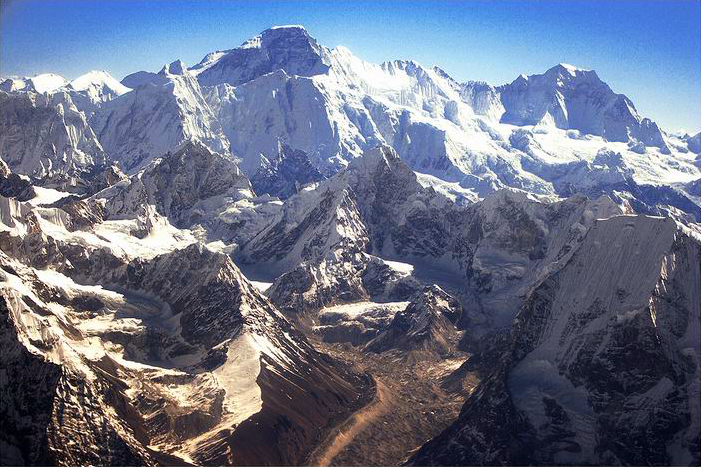
Viewing Cho Oyu, from the southwest, via mountain flight

- 1952 British Cho Oyu expedition
- Nangpa La shooting incident (in 2006)
- Cho Oyu 8201m – Field Recordings from Tibet
- List of deaths on Cho Oyu
- List of ultras of the Himalayas

== Sources ==
- Hillary, Edmund (2003) [1955]. High Adventure. Oxford University Press. pp. 1–245. ISBN 9780195167344.
- Tichy, Herbert (1955). Cho Oyu - Gnade der Götter [Cho Oyu - Grace of the Gods] (in German). Vienna: Ullstein.
