= Friedrich Theodor Fischer =

German architect and Baden construction official

Friedrich Theodor Fischer (September 8, 1803, in Karlsruhe – November 14, 1867) was a German architect and Baden construction official.

== Life ==
Fischer received his professional training at the state-sponsored private construction school in Karlsruhe, which had been run by Friedrich Weinbrenner since 1800. He was also trained in Huot's studio and at Franz Christian Gau's school of architecture in Paris. After passing the Baden state examination with distinction in 1826, he undertook major study trips through Germany, France and Italy.

After his return from Italy, Fischer was appointed administrator of the Heidelberg construction inspectorate in 1833, construction inspector in 1835 and construction officer in Karlsruhe in 1844, and was promoted to senior building inspector in 1855. In 1854, he succeeded Heinrich Hübsch as head of the Karlsruhe construction school. This construction school, which had been run by Weinbrenner as a private institution since 1800, had been part of the newly founded Polytechnical School Karlsruhe since 1825.

Also as the successor to Heinrich Hübsch, Fischer was appointed to head the Baden construction administration in 1864.

== Buildings and designs (selection) ==
- In 1826, after Weinbrenner's death, Fischer was the architect in charge of the Staatliche Münze in Karlsruhe.
- From 1831 to 1833 he built the customs house in Kadelburg in the round arch style
- 1838/39 Reconstruction of the Catholic Church of St. Bartholomew in Görwihl, which had been destroyed by lightning and fire
- 1843 to 1847 Restoration of the New Castle in Baden-Baden, where he rebuilt parts of the building and rooms in the Renaissance style. Fischer thus achieved further recognition for his talent for the decorative.
- 1858–59: Old mechanical engineering building of the Karlsruhe Institute of Technology
- 1861–64 he extended the Polytechnikum (main building of the KIT) and designed its main portal in the Rundbogenstil
- 1865 Fischer built the town hall of Tauberbischofsheim in the neo-Gothic style.
- 1864 Maternity hospital in Freiburg. It was destroyed in World War II
- 1865–1867 he built the Anatomical Institute of the University of Freiburg. The original building was destroyed in the First World War, the reconstruction was bombed in 1944 during the Second World War.

Fischer's further work includes around 30 Protestant and Catholic churches for rural parishes and smaller towns in Baden.

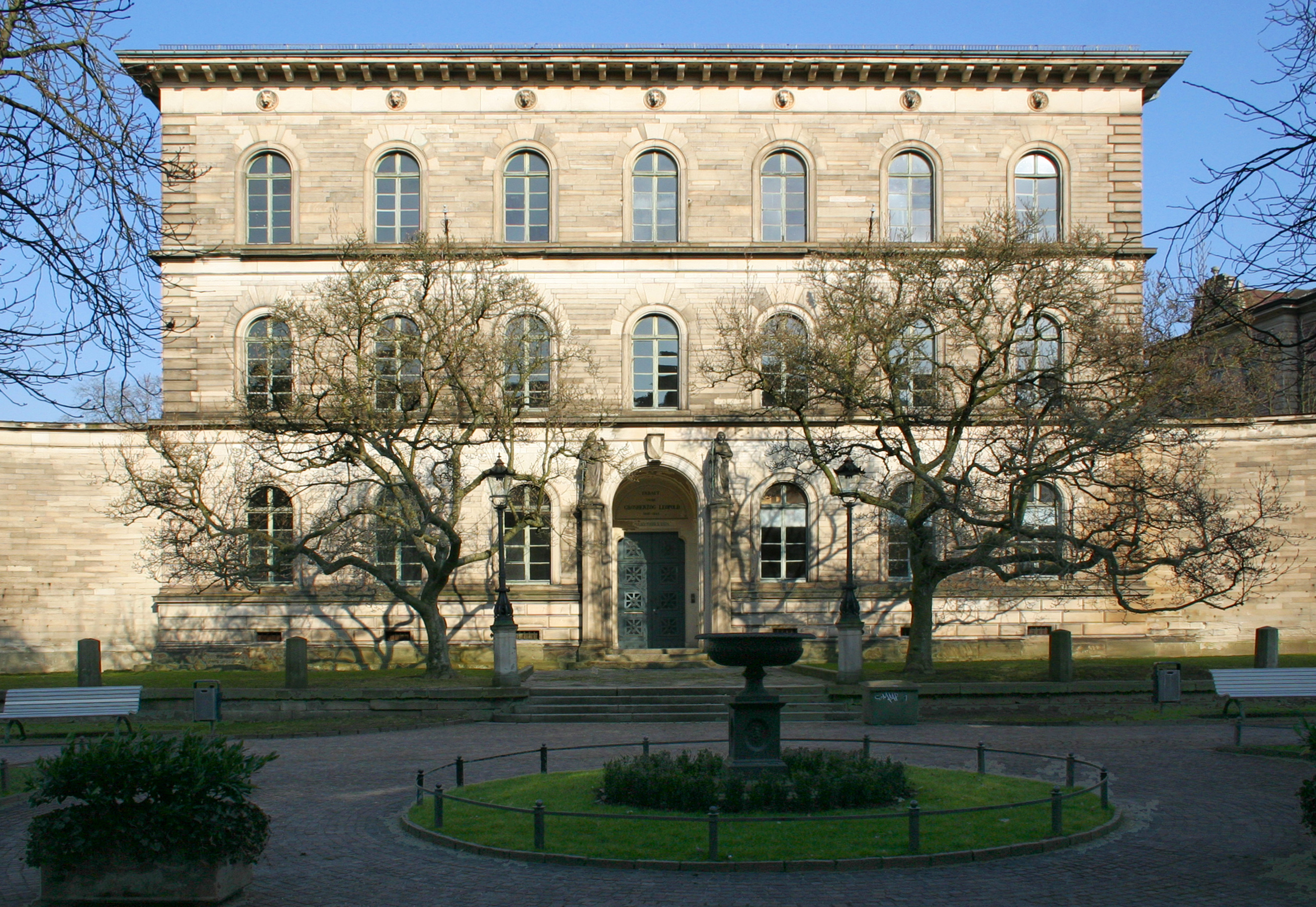
Former grand-ducal Baden-Baden office building, built in 1842/1843

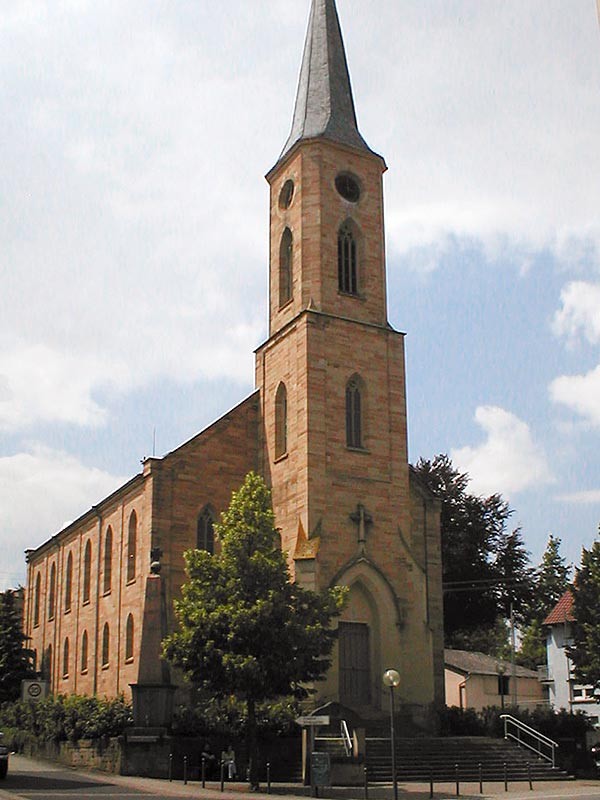
Evangelic church in Waldangelloch, 1861

== Awards ==
- 1847 Order of the Zähringer Lion
- 1855 Honorary member of the Karlsruhe Architects' Association
- 1860 Honorary member of the Swiss Architects' Association
- 1865 Honorary Member and Corresponding Member of the Royal Institute of British Architects

== Literature ==
- D.: Nekrolog. In: Mitglieder des Architektenvereins zu Berlin (ed.): Wochenblatt, vol. 1 (1867), no. 49 (December 6, 1867), p. 475
- Falko Lehmann: Friedrich Theodor Fischer (1803–1867). Architekt im Grossherzogtum Baden. Geiger, Horb am Neckar 1988, ISBN 3-89264-179-X.
