= Stefan Anton Reck =

German conductor

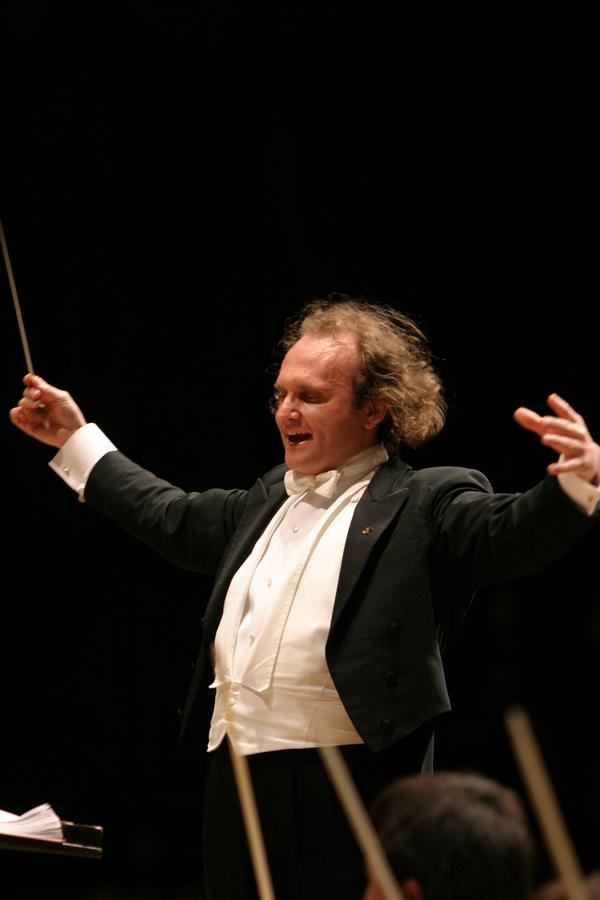
- Stefan Anton Reck in 2008

Background information
- Born: 1960 (age 65–66); Baden-Baden, Germany
- Genre: Classical
- Occupations: Conductor, painter
- Website: www.stefan-anton-reck.com

Stefan Anton Reck is a German orchestra conductor and painter. He was born on 26 April 1960 in Baden-Baden, Germany.

== Career ==
After attending the Richard Wagner-Gymnasium in Baden-Baden, Reck studied piano at the Hochschule für Musik in Freiburg. Simultaneously, he studied philosophy and art history at the University of Freiburg. He then continued his studies in Berlin at the Hochschule der Künste, graduating in 1986. In 1985, while still studying at the Hochschule der Künste, he won the 1st International Arturo Toscanini competition for orchestra conductors, followed by the first prize in the International Gino Marinuzzi Competition for orchestra conducting. Later, he was awarded a scholarship from the Tanglewood Music Festival, providing him with the opportunity to study with Seiji Ozawa and Leonard Bernstein.

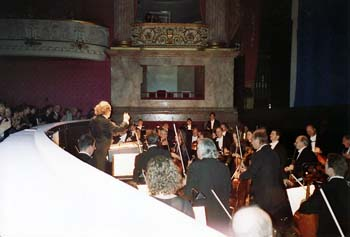
At the Bayerische Staatsoper München. Alban Berg: Lulu, 2004-2005

Reck is best-known his interpretations of Gustav Mahler’s work, as well as of the Second Viennese School’s (Berg, Schoenberg, and Webern). He is also noted for his interest and support of contemporary music, as well as numerous collaborations with orchestras across Europe. Reck has collaborated with the Gustav Mahler Jugendorchester, leading performances of works by Shostakovich, Bartók, Mahler, and Scriabin. In 2013, he conducted Wagner's Der fliegende Holländer at Teatro Comunale of Bologna and at Teatro San Carlo of Naples. Yannis Kokos directed the performance.

== Discography ==
- R. Strauss, Daphne, Gran Teatro La Fenice, Dynamic, CD et DVD
- Berg, Lulu, Teatro Massimo di Palermo, OehmsClassics
- Wagner Portrait, Albert Dohmen, Orchestra del Teatro Massimo di Palermo, Arte Nova Classics
- Schostakowitsch, Symphonie n° 1, op. 10; Skrjabin, Le Poème de l’Extase, op. 54, Gustav Mahler Jugendorchester, Edition Zeitklang
- Schönberg, Erwartung (Anja Silja); Poulenc, La voix humaine (Raina Kabaivanska), Orchestra del Teatro Massimo di Palermo
- Mahler, Symphonie n° 7, Gustav Mahler Jugendorchester, Preiser Records
- Mahler, Symphonie n° 10, Adagio; Wagner, Wotans Abschied und Feuerzauber; Bartók, Der wunderbare Mandarin, Gustav Mahler Jugendorchester, Preiser Records
- Tutino, Riccardo III, Orchestre del Teatro Sociale di Rovigo, Ermitage

== Press ==
- Opéra international 255, mars 2001, Berg, Lulu
- Die Opernwelt, März 2001, Berg, Lulu
- FAZ Nr. 261, 9. 11. 2001, Lulu CD
- Süddeutsche Zeitung Nr. 245, 24. 10. 2001, Lulu CD
- Stuttgarter Zeitung, 13. 2. 2002, Lulu CD
- FAZ Nr. 114, 18. 5. 2002, Schoenberg, Moses und Aron
- Midi libre, 14. 12. 2003, Berlioz, Symphonie fantastique
- Anaclase, 29. 4. 2005, Berg, Violin Concerto, Mahler, Symphony n° 6
- Die Opernwelt, November 2005, Wagner, Meistersinger von Nürnberg
- Münchner Merkur, 1. 10. 2005, Wagner, Meistersinger von Nürnberg
- The Scotsman, 16. 8. 2006, Mahler, Das Lied von der Erde
- The Herald, 16. 8. 2006, Mahler, Das Lied von der Erde
- Seen and heard international opera reviews, 18. 10. 2008, Strauss, Ariadne auf Naxos
- Wanderer's Blog, 10/2009, Beethoven, Egmont, Eroica
- L’Hérault du jour, 10. 11. 2009, Mahler, Symphony n° 6
- Midi libre, 10. 11. 2009, Mahler, Symphony n° 6
