= Olympic town =

Olympic town is an honorary designation given by the International Olympic Committee to certain towns, which have had a profound importance for the Olympic movement.

Among towns awarded this designation is Baden-Baden, given it in 1997, because of it hosting the Olympic Congress of 1981.

Lausanne has been named the "Olympic capital".
