= Anna Zerr =

German operatic soprano

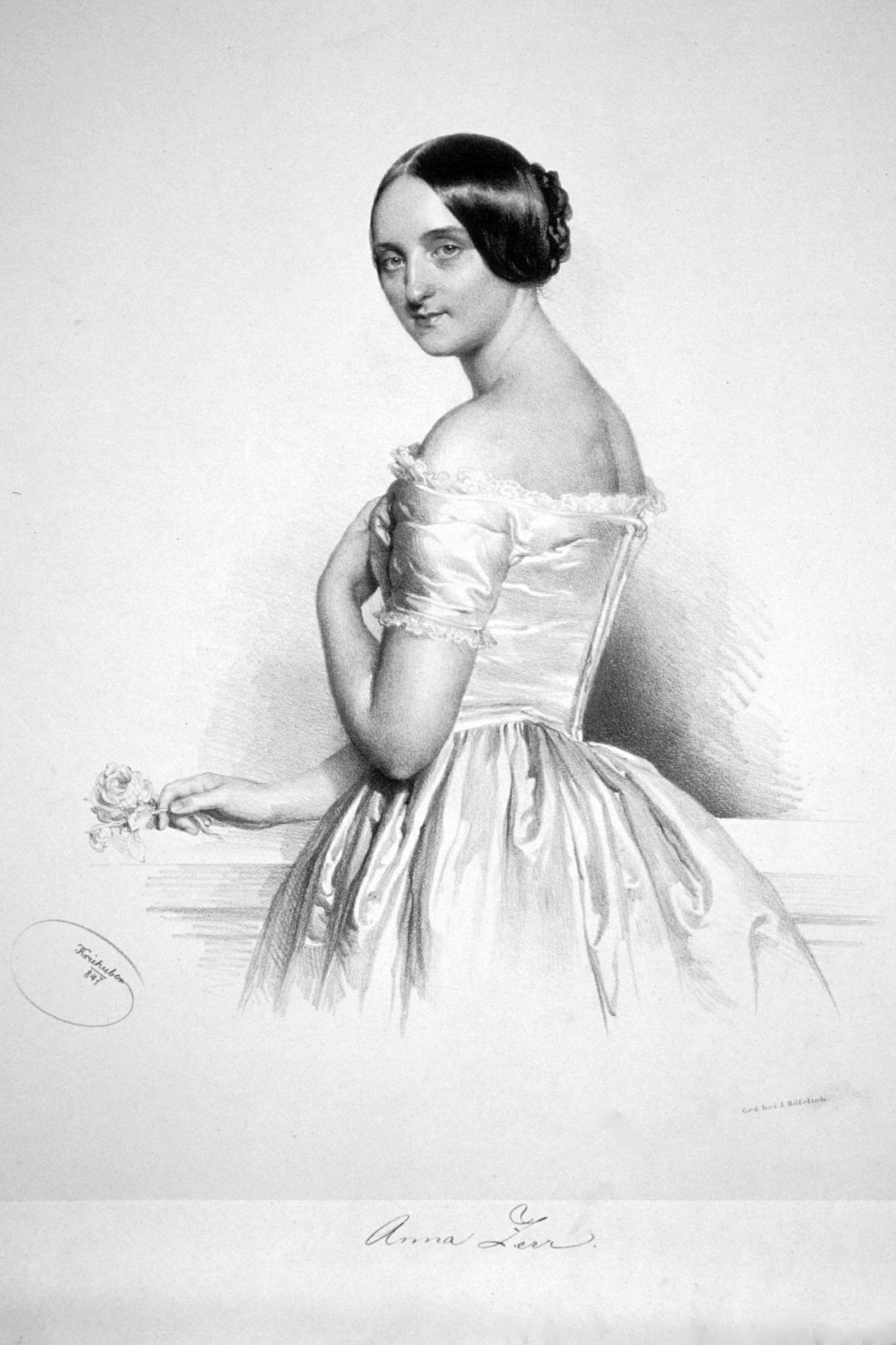
Lithograph of Anna Zerr (1847) by Josef Kriehuber

Anna Zerr (26 July 1822 – 14 December 1881) was a German operatic soprano.

Zerr, a native of Baden-Baden, studied in Paris before making her debut in 1839, singing the role of Amina in La sonnambula in Karlsruhe. In 1846 she joined the Vienna Hofoper, debuting in the title role of Lucia di Lammermoor and in 1847 creating the title role in Friedrich von Flotow's opera Martha. In 1848 she announced that she would sing in London at a concert for Hungarian refugees who were associated with the Hungarian independence advocate Lajos Kossuth and the Hungarian Revolution of 1848; this led to her dismissal from her post and the revocation of her title of Kammersängerin. In 1851 she was the Queen of the Night for the Royal Opera House, where she also sang Röschen in Faust of Louis Spohr and Catherine in Pietro il grande of Louis-Antoine Jullien, the latter in 1852. She retired six years later, and died in Winterbach.
