= Franz Zureich =

German artist (1904–1992)

Franz Zureich (1904–1992) was a German painter, graphic artist, illustrator, and caricaturist.

Influenced by Albert Haueisen, Zureich was best known for his city representations, decorative motives, industrial etchings, illustrations, and satirical designs.

== Life and career ==
Zureich was born in Karlsruhe. From 1922 to 1926, he studied painting and graphics at the Academy of Fine Arts in Karlsruhe with professors Hermann Gohler, Wilhelm Schnarrenberger, August Froh, Friedrich Fehr, and Walter Conz. From 1934 to 1937, he was a master pupil of graphics with Professor Hermann Kupferschmid.

Zureich's honor awards include the 1932 state prizes: Preis im Saar-Wettbewerb (Saar Competition prize) and the Preis Ausschmuckung der Stadt Karksruhe (Decoration of Karlsruhe prize). Zureich's talent for searching character study is patent from the pencil drawings Zwei Damen und Balkon.

From 1939 to 1945, he served in Lapland as a war picture correspondent. After the war, he became a freelance artist working in Karlsruhe from 1946 to 1949, which was predominantly pencil drawings and watercolors of city scenes, traditional costumes, greeting cards, and large-scale etchings for the steel industry. This included blast furnaces, bridge construction, shipbuilding, and refineries.

Franz Zureich worked as a freelance employee of the Krupp and Demag companies from 1949 to 1981. His artwork Krupp: 15000 t-Presse was published in the Leipziger Illustrierte Zeitung (Leipziger Illustrated Newspaper), one of Germany's most prestigious weekly news magazines.

His artwork Demag: Giesspfannen beim fullen der kokillen (Demag: foundry ladles during fill the mold) was exhibited at the House of German Art in Munich.

He also made large-scale etchings of all work in the building of hydro-electric power plants at Waldshut and Bad Sackingen, built for Schluchseewerk AG, operators of the largest hydro-electric power plant complexes in Germany.

Zureich made etchings of the movable weirs and dikes around the level reach of the Iffezheim Rhine River Dam hydro-electric power station, put into operation in 1978. Iffezheim is one of the largest hydropower stations in Europe.

He had a workshop in Baden-Baden, where he continued to produce art until he died in Baden-Baden in 1992.
