= New Castle (Baden-Baden) =

Castle in Baden-Baden

Coordinates: 48°45′52″N 8°14′30″E

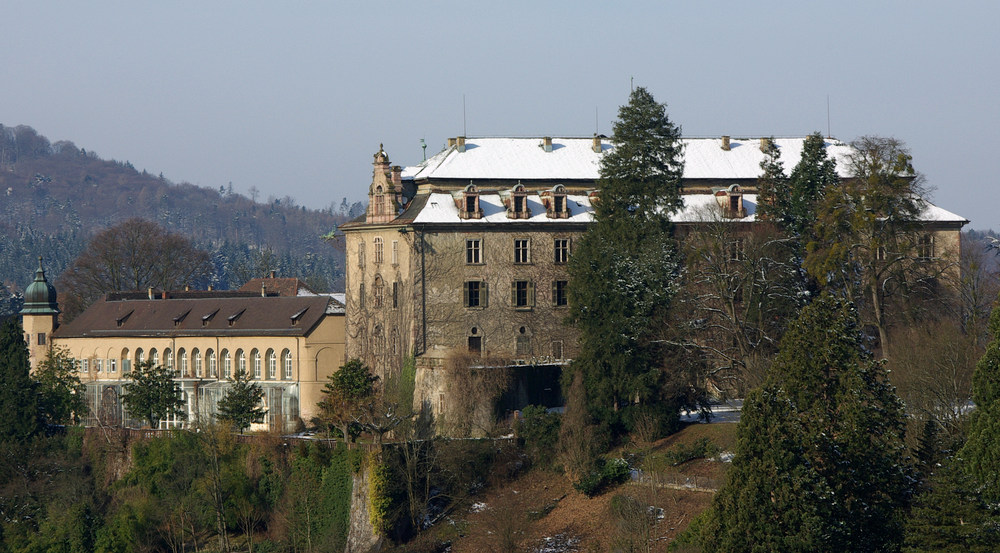
View of the New Castle from the southeast (2009)

The New Castle (German: Neues Schloss) on the Florentinerberg in Baden-Baden was the seat of the Margraves of Baden from the late 15th century to the end of the 17th century and of the Margraves of Baden-Baden from 1535. As a castle complex from the Late Middle Ages, it has been rebuilt and extended several times. Today, the listed building is owned by Kuwaiti investors who wanted to convert the castle into a luxury hotel.

== Architecture ==
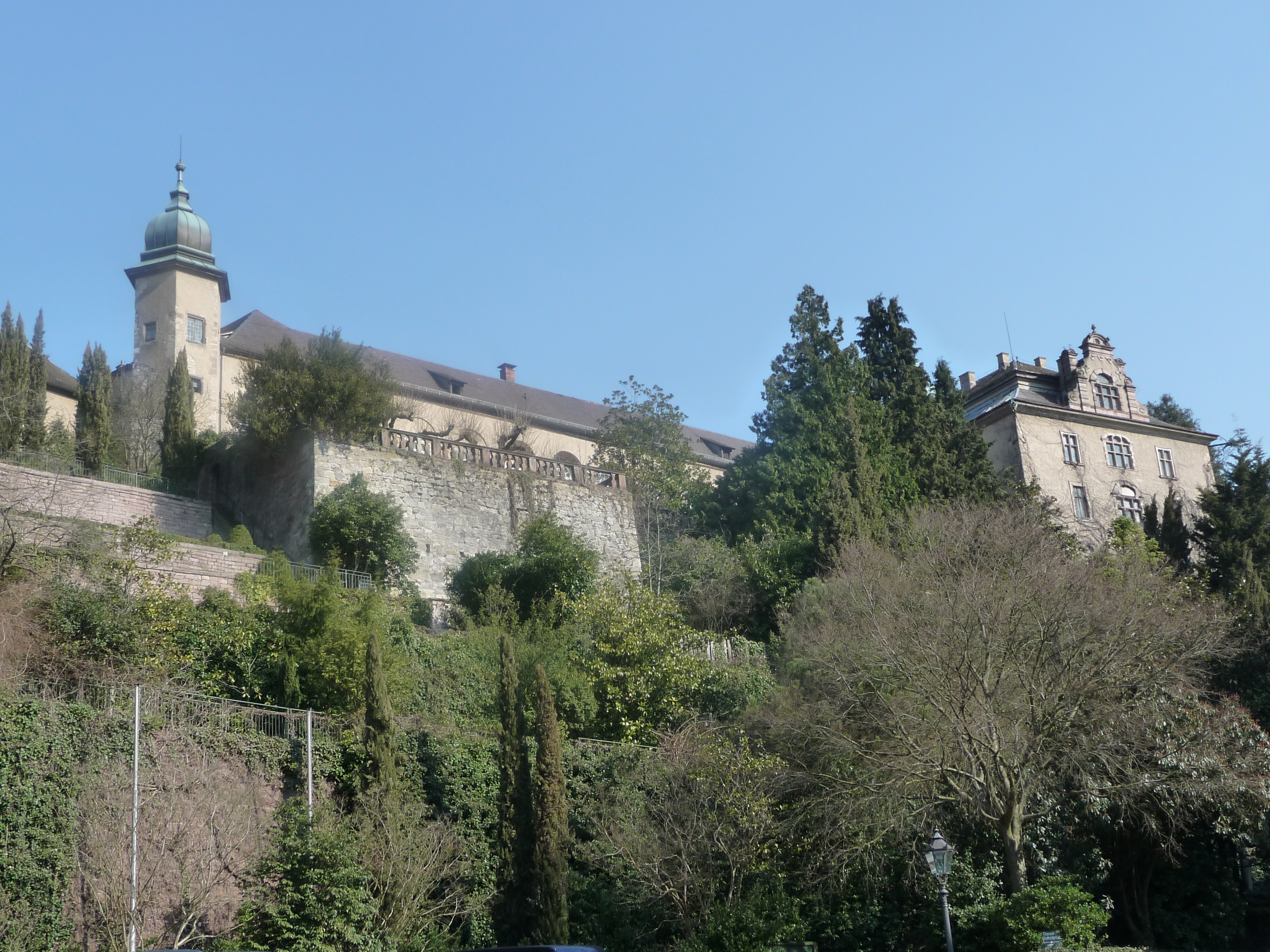
View of the New Castle from the market square

The most important parts of the building are: the three-storey main castle, the carriage house, the kitchen building and the archive tower (all Renaissance buildings from the 16th century) as well as the cavalier house in the castle courtyard, which can be accessed through the western gatehouse that was built in the 15th century. A palace garden with rare plants and trees forms a border to the New Castle in the east. From its 130-metre-long terrace (laid out in 1670), visitors can access terraced gardens with a variety of exotic plants. The park covers around 5.5 hectares.

== History ==
The construction of a castle complex on older walls above the market square of the town of Baden can be dated to between 1388 and 1399. The town was granted Town privileges in the second half of the 13th century. Around 1479, Margrave Christopher I converted the complex into a residence, making it the successor to Hohenbaden Castle. From 1529, the New Palace housed the archive of the Margraves of Baden.

After the palace was destroyed by the troops of the French King Louis XIV in the Nine Years' War, Margrave Louis William moved the seat of government to Rastatt and built a new residence in the form of Schloss Rastatt.

The New Castle in Baden-Baden was rebuilt in the early 18th century using the remaining outer walls. In the 19th century, it served as a summer residence for the Grand Dukes. Grand Duke Leopold had the palace restored by Friedrich Theodor Fischer in 1843–47. The state rooms were decorated in a new Renaissance style. Around 1900, the castellan showed paying visitors the banqueting halls and the grand ducal living quarters. The so-called Dagobert Tower, a pavilion with a spiral staircase from the period after 1575 that was destroyed in the Second World War, and the cellar vaults "with stone and iron doors, probably former dungeons" were also included. The castle garden was always open and free of charge.

In 1919, the New Castle was granted to the House of Baden as private property following the separation of house and state assets after the November Revolution. It received the art treasures from the other palaces that had been left to the former ruling house, including the holdings of the older Zähringer Museum from the nationalized Karlsruhe Palace.

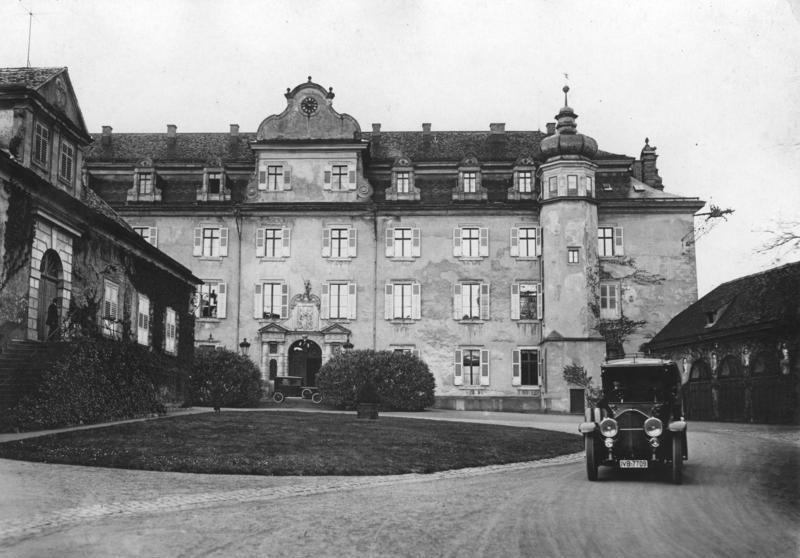
Inner courtyard of the New Castle, photo from 1923

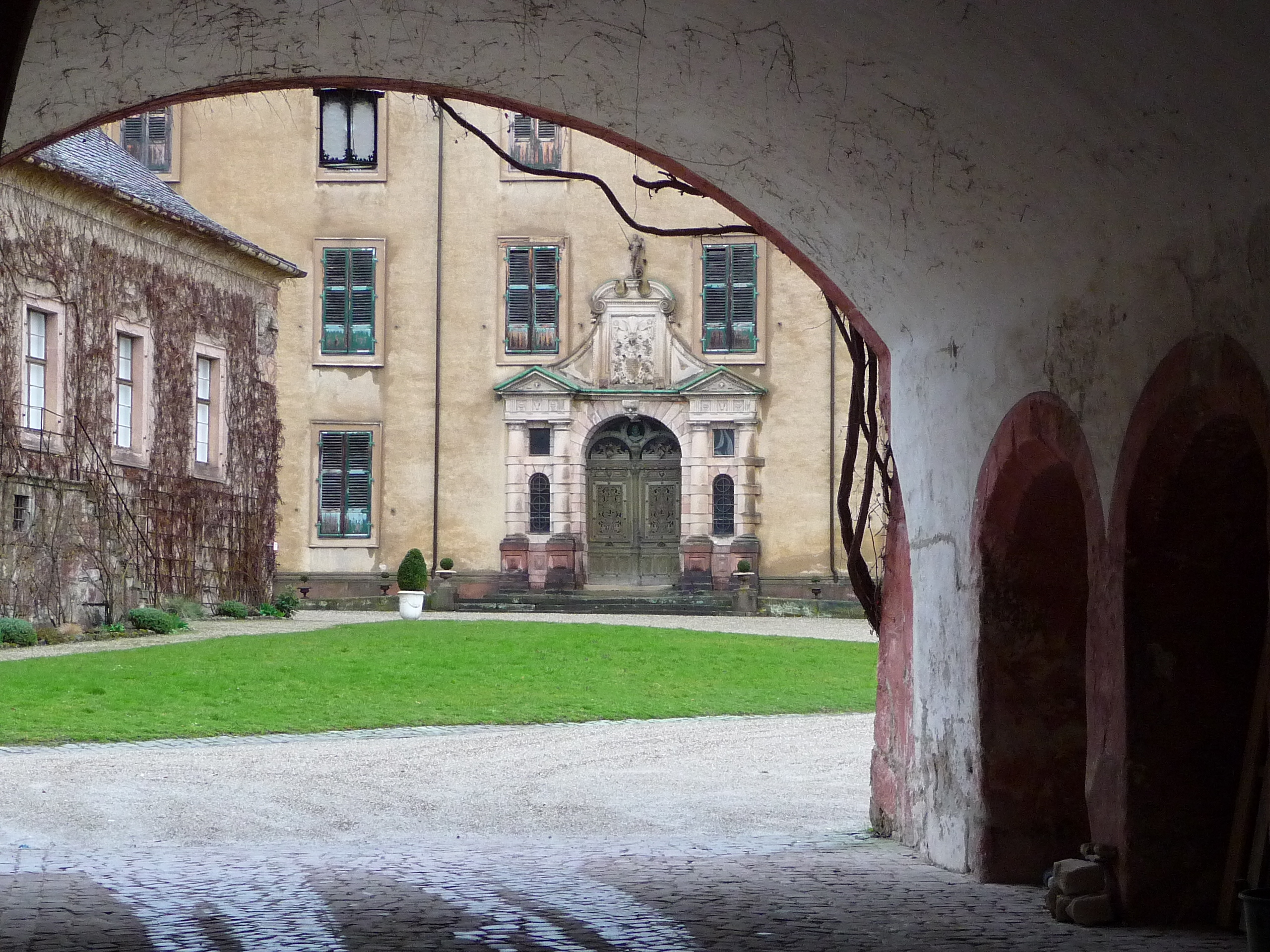
View into the inner courtyard 2009

In 1946, the (South) Baden Ministry of Culture in Freiburg, with the support of Berthold von Baden, established a Baden historical museum in the New Castle, which also bore the name Zähringer Museum (predecessor of the Wehrgeschichtliches Museum Rastatt). After the end of this joint project, the (new) Zähringermuseum was opened in 1960 and effectively existed until 1981. In 1995, Sotheby's auctioned off the family's collections and large parts of the inventory to great media interest (Margrave Auction).

After being sold by the von Baden family in October 2003, the castle became the property of the Kuwaiti Al-Hassawi group of companies. Businesswoman Fawzia al-Hassawi, daughter of the company founder, developed plans for a new use - from a luxury hotel to a vacation home for her family.

In April 2010, the city of Baden-Baden granted permission for the conversion of the New Palace into a luxury hotel with 130 rooms, which was originally due to open in 2013. The conversion work, which was estimated to cost around 90 million euros, began in summer 2010. Subsequently, there were repeated interruptions, partly due to the new operators' plans to build condominiums in a new wing in the castle garden and the relatively late presentation of an operator, which the city council had made a condition for planning permission for the additional building. At the end of 2012, it was announced that the American hotel group Hyatt would take on this role. In mid-2014, revised plans were once again made public: the opening date was moved to 2018 and the target number of rooms was increased to 146. The sale of the 16 condominiums was to be used to refinance the hotel conversion. After several years of stalled construction and doubts about the financial viability of the project, Baden-Baden's municipal council decided to finally cancel the development plan on February 21, 2022.

== Literature ==
- Ulrich Coenen: Von Aquae bis Baden-Baden - Die Baugeschichte der Stadt und ihr Beitrag zur Entwicklung der Kurarchitektur. Verlagshaus Mainz, Aachen, Mainz 2008, ISBN 978-3-8107-0023-0, pp. 95–99, 161–172.
- Kunst- und Kulturdenkmale im Landkreis Rastatt und in Baden-Baden, published by the district of Rastatt and the city of Baden-Baden. Konrad-Theiss Verlag GmbH, Stuttgart 2002, ISBN 3-8062-1599-5.
