= Baden-Baden =

Spa town in Baden-Württemberg, Germany

- Town
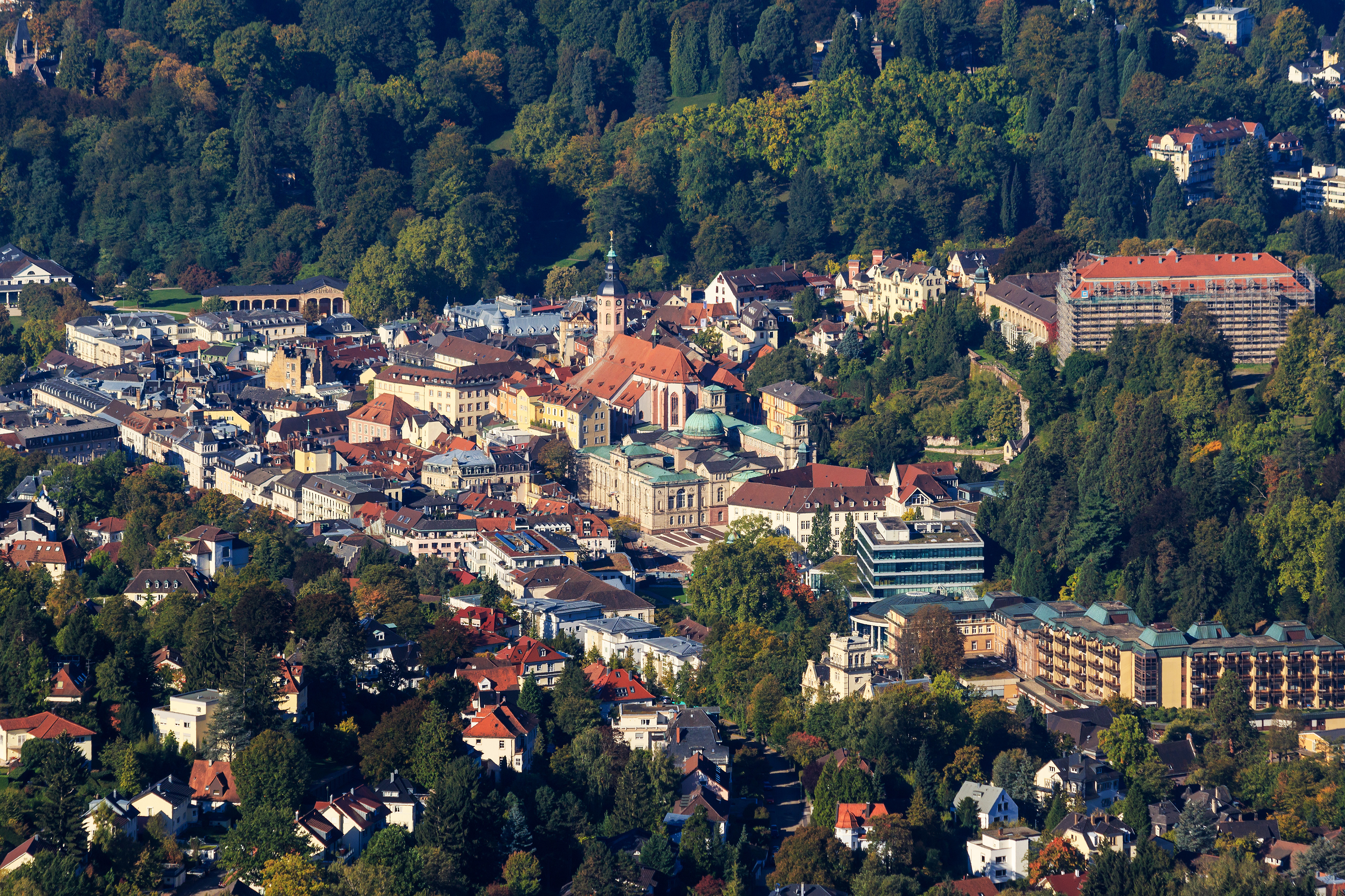
- View of Baden-Baden from Mount Merkur

- Flag Coat of arms
- Interactive map of Baden-Baden
- Location within Germany Location within Baden-Württemberg
- Coordinates: 48°45′46″N 08°14′27″E
- Country: Germany
- State: Baden-Württemberg
- Admin. region: Karlsruhe
- District: Urban district

Government
  - Mayor (2022–30): Dietmar Späth

Area
  - Total: 140.18 km^{2} (54.12 sq mi)
- Elevation: 181 m (594 ft)

Population (2025-12-31)
  - Total: 56,952
  - Density: 406.28/km^{2} (1,052.3/sq mi)
- Time zone: UTC+01:00 (CET)
  - Summer (DST): UTC+02:00 (CEST)
- Postal codes: 76530–76534
- Dialling codes: 07221, 07223
- Vehicle registration: BAD
- Website: baden-baden.de

UNESCO World Heritage Site
- Part of: The Great Spa Towns of Europe
- Criteria: Cultural: (ii)(iii)
- Reference: 1613
- Inscription: 2021 (44th Session)

Baden-Baden (German pronunciation: [ˈbaːdn̩ ˈbaːdn̩]) is a spa town in the state of Baden-Württemberg, south-western Germany, at the north-western border of the Black Forest mountain range on the small river Oos, ten kilometres (six miles) east of the Rhine, the France–Germany border, and forty kilometres (twenty-five miles) north-east of Strasbourg, France.

In 2021, the town became part of the transnational UNESCO World Heritage Site under the name "Great Spa Towns of Europe", because of its famous spas and architecture that exemplifies the popularity of spa towns in Europe in the 18th through 20th centuries.

== Name ==
The springs at Baden-Baden were known to the Romans as "Aquae" ("The Waters") and "Aurelia Aquensis" ("Aurelia-of-the-Waters") after M. Aurelius Severus Alexander Augustus.

In modern German, "Baden" is a noun meaning "bathing", but "Baden", the original name of the town, derives from an earlier plural form of Bad ("bath"). (Modern German uses the plural form Bäder.) As with the English placename "Bath", other Badens are at hot springs throughout Central Europe. The current doubled name arose to distinguish it from the others, particularly Baden near Vienna in Austria and Baden near Zurich in Switzerland. The original Margraviate of Baden (1112–1535) split into several territories, including Baden-Baden and Baden-Durlach. The name "Baden-Baden" distinguished the Margraviate of Baden-Baden (1535–1771), from the Margraviate of Baden-Durlach. "Baden-Baden" thus means the town of Baden in the territory of Baden, whereas the name of the Margraviate of Baden-Baden meant "the Margraviate of Baden with its princely seat at Baden". Baden-Baden formally got its current name in 1931.

== Geography ==
Baden-Baden lies in a valley of the Northern Black Forest in southwestern Germany. The western districts lie within the Upper Rhine Plain. The highest mountain of Baden-Baden is the Badener Höhe (1,002.5 m above sea level (NHN)), which is part of the Black Forest National Park. The old town lies on the side of a hill on the right bank of the Oos. Since the 19th century, the principal resorts have been located on the other side of the river. There are 29 natural springs in the area, varying in temperature from 46 to 67 °C (115 to 153 °F). The water is rich in salt and flows from artesian wells 1,800 m (5,900 ft) under Florentine Hill at a rate of 341 litres (90 gallons) per minute and is conveyed through pipes to the town's baths.

== History ==
Roman settlement at Baden-Baden has been dated as far back as the emperor Hadrian, but on dubious authority. The known ruins of the Roman bath were rediscovered just below the New Castle in 1847 and date to the reign of Caracalla (AD 210s), who visited the area to relieve his arthritic aches. The facilities were used by the Roman garrison in Strasbourg.

The town fell into ruin but its church was first constructed in the 7th century. By 1112, it was the seat of the Margraviate of Baden. The Lichtenthal Convent (Kloster Lichtenthal) was founded in 1254. The margraves initially used Hohenbaden Castle (the Old Castle, Altes Schloss), whose ruins still occupy the summit above the town, but they completed and moved to the New Castle (Neues Schloss) in 1479. The Margraviate was divided in 1535, with Baden-Baden becoming the capital of the Margraviate of Baden-Baden, while the other portion became the Margraviate of Baden-Durlach. The Baden-Baden witch trials, an investigating encompassing the entire territory and resulting in hundreds of verdicts, took place in 1627–1631. Baden suffered severely during the Thirty Years' War, particularly at the hands of the French, who plundered it in 1643. They returned to occupy the city in 1688 at the onset of the Nine Years' War, burning it to the ground the next year. The margravine Sibylla rebuilt the New Castle in 1697, but the margrave Louis William removed his seat to Rastatt in 1706. The Stiftskirche was rebuilt in 1753 and houses the tombs of several of the margraves.

The town began its recovery in the late 18th century, serving as a refuge for émigrés from the French Revolution. The town was frequented during the Second Congress of Rastatt in 1797–99 and became popular after the visit of the Prussian queen in the early 19th century. She came for medicinal reasons, as the waters were recommended for gout, rheumatism, paralysis, neuralgia, skin disorders, and stones. The Ducal government subsequently subsidized the resort's development. The town became a meeting place for the nobility and prosperous upper middle classes, who visited the hot springs and the town's other amenities: luxury hotels, the Spielbank Casino, horse races, and the gardens of the Lichtentaler Allee. Guests included Queen Victoria, Wilhelm I, and Berlioz. The pumproom (Trinkhalle) was completed in 1842. The Grand Duchy's railway's mainline reached Baden in 1845. Reaching its zenith under Napoleon III in the 1850s and '60s, Baden became "Europe's summer capital". With a population of around 10 000, the town's size could quadruple during the tourist season, with the French, British, Russians, and Americans all well represented. (French tourism fell off following the Franco-Prussian War.)

The theater was completed in 1861 and a Greek church with a gilt dome was erected on the Michaelsberg in 1863 to serve as the tomb of the teenage son of the prince of Moldavia Mihail Sturdza after he died during a family vacation. A Russian Orthodox church was also subsequently erected. The casino was closed for a time in the 1870s.

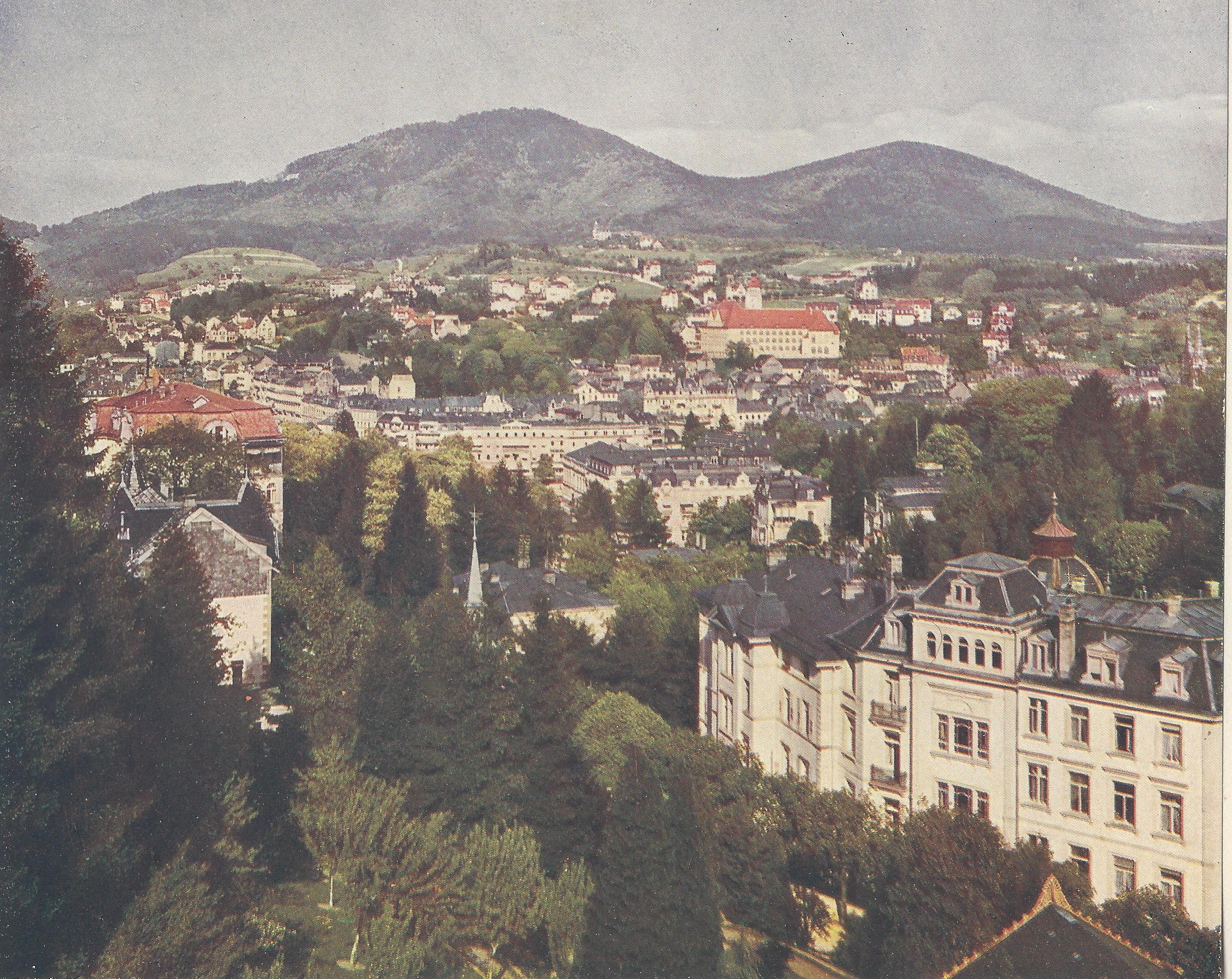
Baden-Baden in 1910

Just before the First World War, the town was receiving 70 000 visitors each year.

During the Second World War, 3.1% of the houses in Baden-Baden were completely destroyed by bombs and 125 civilians were killed. 5.8% of the houses were heavily damaged by bombs. Lichtenthal, a residential area in the southwest of the town, was hit by bombs and Saint Bonifatius Church was severely damaged on 11 March 1943. Balg, a residential area in the northeast of Baden-Baden, was hit by bombs on 17 December 1944. On 30 December 1944 one third of the buildings of Oos (i.e. about 300 houses), a residential area in the north of the town, was destroyed or heavily damaged by bombs and Saint Dionysius Church was severely damaged as well. On 2 January 1945 the railway station of Oos and various barracks on Schwarzwald Road were heavily damaged by bombs. After World War II, Baden-Baden became the headquarters of the French occupation forces in Germany as well as of the Südwestfunk, one of Germany's large public broadcasting stations, which is now part of Südwestrundfunk. From 23 to 28 September 1981, the 11th Olympic Congress took place in Baden-Baden's Kurhaus. The town was later awarded the designation Olympic town. The Festspielhaus Baden-Baden, Germany's largest opera and concert house, opened in 1998.

CFB Baden-Soellingen, a military airfield built in the 1950s in the Upper Rhine Plain, 10 km (6 mi) west of downtown Baden-Baden, was converted into a civil airport in the 1990s. Karlsruhe/Baden-Baden Airport, or Baden Airpark is now the second-largest airport in Baden-Württemberg by number of passengers.

== Climate ==
The climate in this area has mild differences between highs and lows, and there is precipitation year round. The Köppen Climate Classification subtype for this climate is "Cfb" (Marine West Coast Climate/Oceanic climate).

The Baden-Baden weather station has recorded the following extreme values:

- Highest Temperature 38.0 °C (100.4 °F) on 25 July 2019.
- Lowest Temperature −21.3 °C (−6.3 °F) on 10 February 1956.
- Wettest Year 1,597.0 mm (62.87 in) in 1965.
- Driest Year 733.7 mm (28.89 in) in 1959.
- Highest Daily Precipitation: 131.3 mm (5.17 in) on 28 October 1998.
- Earliest Snowfall: 28 October 2012.
- Latest Snowfall: 28 April 1981.

Climate data for Baden-Baden (1991–2020 normals, extremes 1949–present)
| Month | Jan | Feb | Mar | Apr | May | Jun | Jul | Aug | Sep | Oct | Nov | Dec | Year |
|---|---|---|---|---|---|---|---|---|---|---|---|---|---|
| Record high °C (°F) | 19.3 (66.7) | 22.3 (72.1) | 26.6 (79.9) | 31.6 (88.9) | 32.7 (90.9) | 35.5 (95.9) | 38.0 (100.4) | 37.8 (100.0) | 33.6 (92.5) | 28.4 (83.1) | 21.6 (70.9) | 19.7 (67.5) | 38.0 (100.4) |
| Mean maximum °C (°F) | 14.1 (57.4) | 15.7 (60.3) | 19.6 (67.3) | 24.7 (76.5) | 28.3 (82.9) | 31.5 (88.7) | 33.1 (91.6) | 32.4 (90.3) | 27.5 (81.5) | 23.1 (73.6) | 17.8 (64.0) | 14.1 (57.4) | 34.2 (93.6) |
| Mean daily maximum °C (°F) | 5.6 (42.1) | 7.1 (44.8) | 11.4 (52.5) | 16.0 (60.8) | 19.8 (67.6) | 23.2 (73.8) | 25.2 (77.4) | 25.1 (77.2) | 20.5 (68.9) | 15.4 (59.7) | 9.5 (49.1) | 6.3 (43.3) | 15.4 (59.7) |
| Daily mean °C (°F) | 2.2 (36.0) | 2.9 (37.2) | 6.2 (43.2) | 10.0 (50.0) | 14.1 (57.4) | 17.5 (63.5) | 19.3 (66.7) | 18.9 (66.0) | 14.7 (58.5) | 10.4 (50.7) | 5.7 (42.3) | 3.0 (37.4) | 10.4 (50.7) |
| Mean daily minimum °C (°F) | −1.3 (29.7) | −1.1 (30.0) | 1.4 (34.5) | 4.1 (39.4) | 8.2 (46.8) | 11.6 (52.9) | 13.5 (56.3) | 13.1 (55.6) | 9.5 (49.1) | 6.1 (43.0) | 2.2 (36.0) | −0.2 (31.6) | 5.6 (42.1) |
| Mean minimum °C (°F) | −9.8 (14.4) | −8.6 (16.5) | −5.0 (23.0) | −2.6 (27.3) | 2.0 (35.6) | 6.3 (43.3) | 8.6 (47.5) | 8.0 (46.4) | 3.9 (39.0) | −0.6 (30.9) | −4.5 (23.9) | −8.9 (16.0) | −12.3 (9.9) |
| Record low °C (°F) | −19.5 (−3.1) | −21.3 (−6.3) | −15.3 (4.5) | −7.3 (18.9) | −1.4 (29.5) | 2.2 (36.0) | 4.4 (39.9) | 3.8 (38.8) | 0.6 (33.1) | −5.1 (22.8) | −10.2 (13.6) | −16.8 (1.8) | −21.3 (−6.3) |
| Average precipitation mm (inches) | 107.3 (4.22) | 99.1 (3.90) | 106.2 (4.18) | 78.8 (3.10) | 118.5 (4.67) | 103.9 (4.09) | 116.9 (4.60) | 103.1 (4.06) | 91.1 (3.59) | 109.1 (4.30) | 113.1 (4.45) | 122.1 (4.81) | 1,269.2 (49.97) |
| Average extreme snow depth cm (inches) | 5.5 (2.2) | 5.2 (2.0) | 2.4 (0.9) | 0.1 (0.0) | 0 (0) | 0 (0) | 0 (0) | 0 (0) | 0 (0) | 0.1 (0.0) | 0.9 (0.4) | 5.9 (2.3) | 12.0 (4.7) |
| Average precipitation days (≥ 0.1 mm) | 17.7 | 16.0 | 15.7 | 13.5 | 15.8 | 14.4 | 14.9 | 13.6 | 12.7 | 15.0 | 16.9 | 19.1 | 185.4 |
| Average relative humidity (%) | 83.1 | 79.3 | 74.3 | 70.0 | 71.4 | 71.2 | 70.7 | 73.4 | 78.2 | 83.2 | 86.0 | 84.8 | 77.1 |
| Mean monthly sunshine hours | 52.9 | 78.4 | 132.7 | 182.4 | 204.4 | 223.7 | 237.7 | 223.3 | 164.5 | 103.0 | 55.3 | 41.2 | 1,699.5 |
Source: Deutscher Wetterdienst / SKlima.de

== Lord Mayors ==
- 1907–1929: Reinhard Fieser
- 1929–1934: Hermann Elfner
- 1934–1945: Hans Schwedhelm (when he was not in office because of military service, mayor Kurt Bürkle was in office)
- April 1945 – May 1945: Ludwig Schmitt
- May 1945 – January 1946: Karl Beck
- January 1946 – September 1946: Eddy Schacht
- 1946–1969: Ernst Schlapper (CDU) (1888–1976)
- 1969–1990: Walter Carlein (CDU) (1922–2011)
- 1990–1998: Ulrich Wendt (CDU)
- 1998–2006: Sigrun Lang (independent)
- 2006–2014: Wolfgang Gerstner (born 1955), (CDU)
- 2014–2022: Margret Mergen (born 1961), (CDU)
- 2022–present: Dietmar Späth (independent)

== Tourism ==
Baden-Baden is a German spa town. The city offers many options for sports enthusiasts; golf and tennis are both popular in the area. Horse races take place each May, August and October at nearby Iffezheim. The countryside is ideal for hiking and mountain climbing. In the winter Baden-Baden is a skiing destination. There is an 18-hole golf course in Fremersberg.

Sights include:

- The Kurhaus, whose Kurgarten ("Spa Garden") hosts the annual Baden-Baden Summer Nights, featuring live classical music concerts
- Casino
- Friedrichsbad
- Caracalla Spa
- Lichtentaler Allee park and gardens
- Staatliche Kunsthalle Baden-Baden (State Art Gallery)
- Museum Frieder Burda built by Richard Meier for one of Germany's most extensive collections of modern art
- Fabergé Museum
- Museum der Kunst und Technik des 19. Jahrhunderts (Lichtentaler Allee 8), covering the technology of the 19th century
- Kunstmuseum Gehrke-Remund, which exhibits the work of Frida Kahlo
- Brahmshaus, Johannes Brahms's residence, which has been preserved as a museum
- Hohenbaden Castle or Old Castle, a ruin since the 16th century
- New Castle (Neues Schloss), the former residence of the margraves and grand dukes of Baden, now a historical museum
- Festspielhaus Baden-Baden, the second-largest festival hall in Europe
- Ruins of Roman baths, excavated in 1847
- Stiftskirche, a church including the tombs of fourteen margraves of Baden
- Paradise (Paradies), an Italian-style Renaissance garden with many trick fountains
- Mount Merkur, including the Merkurbergbahn funicular railway and observation tower
- Fremersberg Tower
- Sturdza Chapel on the Michaelsberg, a neoclassical chapel with a gilded dome designed by Leo von Klenze which was erected over the tomb of prince Michel Sturdza's son

== Transport ==
=== Road ===
The main road link is autobahn A5 between Basel and Frankfurt via Freiburg, Karlsruhe and Mannheim, which is 10 km away from the inner city.

There are two stations providing intercity bus services: one next to the main railway station and one at the airport.

=== Railway ===
Baden-Baden has three stations, Baden-Baden station being the most important of them.

=== Air ===
Karlsruhe/Baden-Baden Airport is an airport located near Baden-Baden that also serves the city of Karlsruhe. It is Baden-Württemberg's second-largest airport after Stuttgart Airport, and the 18th-largest in Germany with 1,110,500 passengers as of 2016 and mostly serves low-cost and leisure flights.

== Image gallery ==
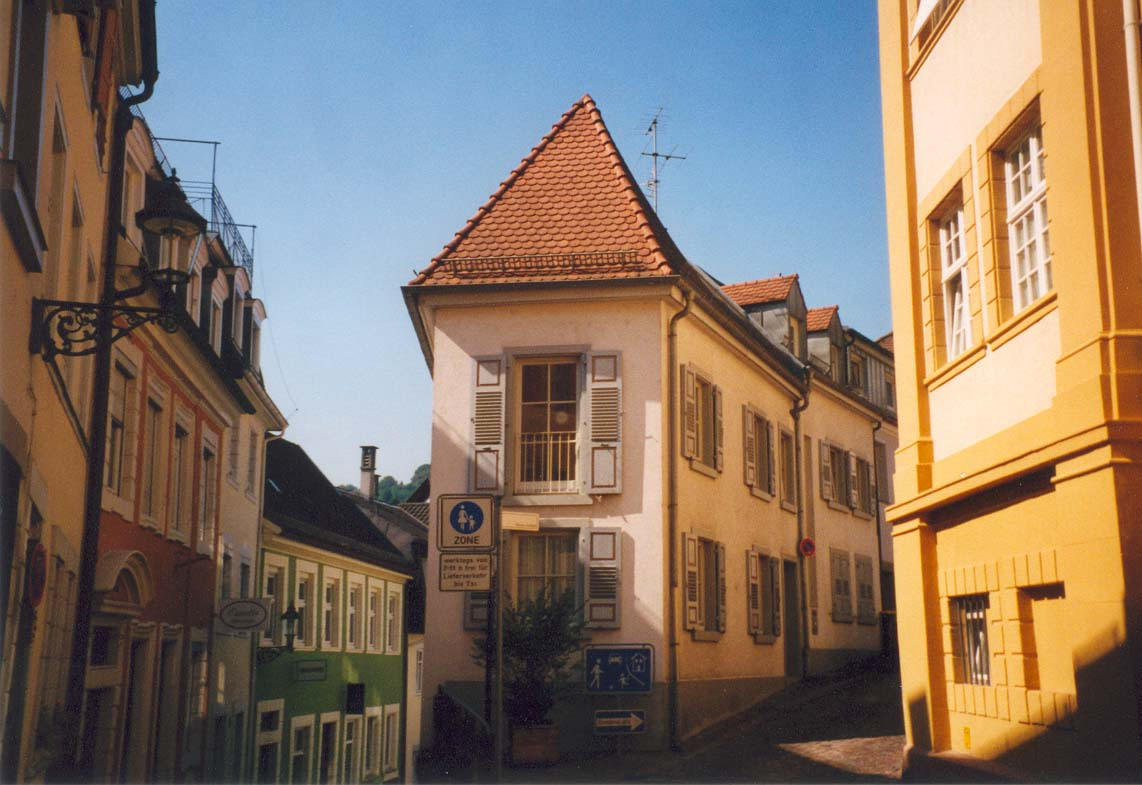
Old town (Altstadt)

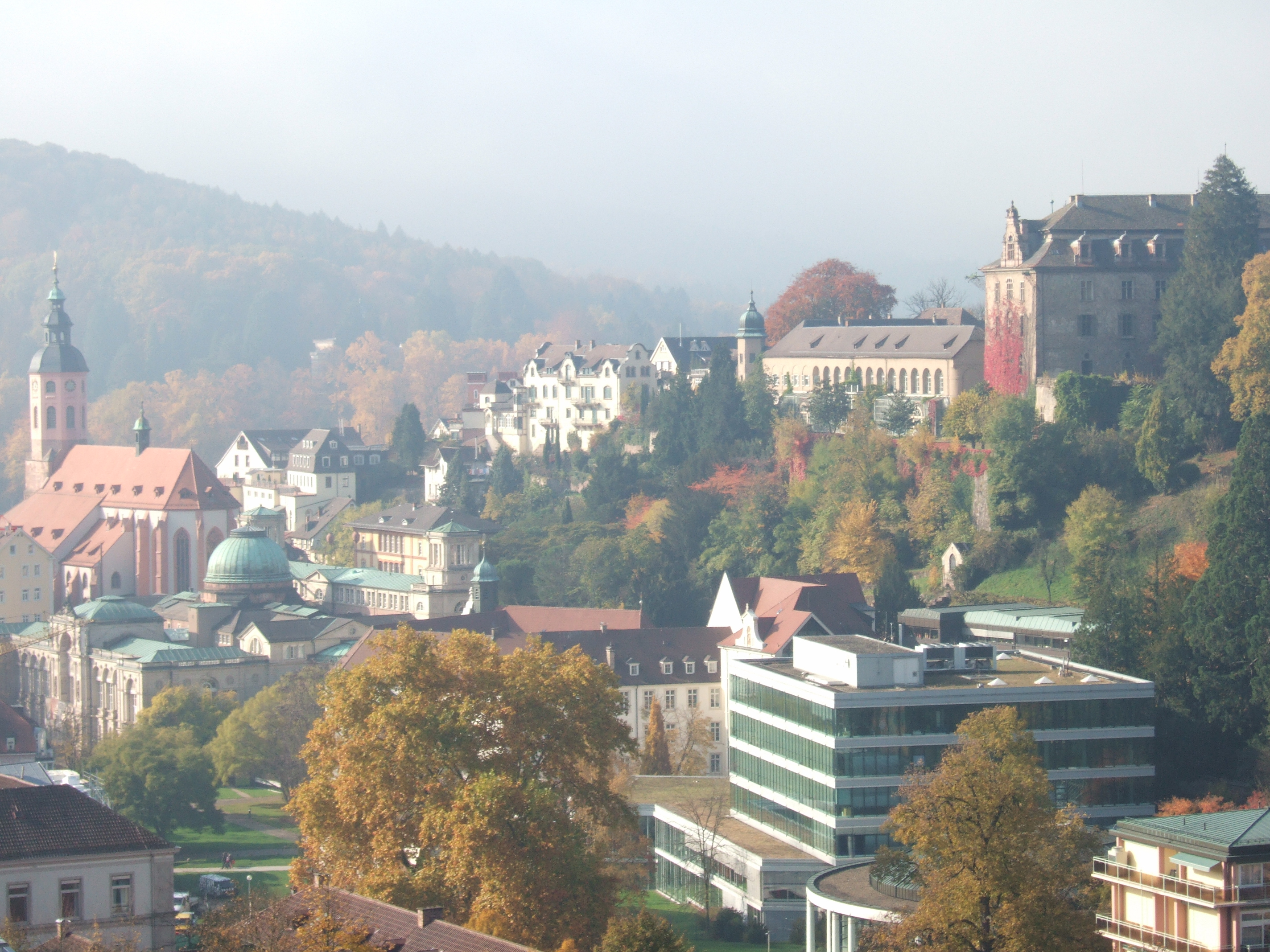
Florentine Hill (Florentinerberg), with the New Castle (top right), the Caracalla Spa (lower right), and the Friedrichsbad (lower left)

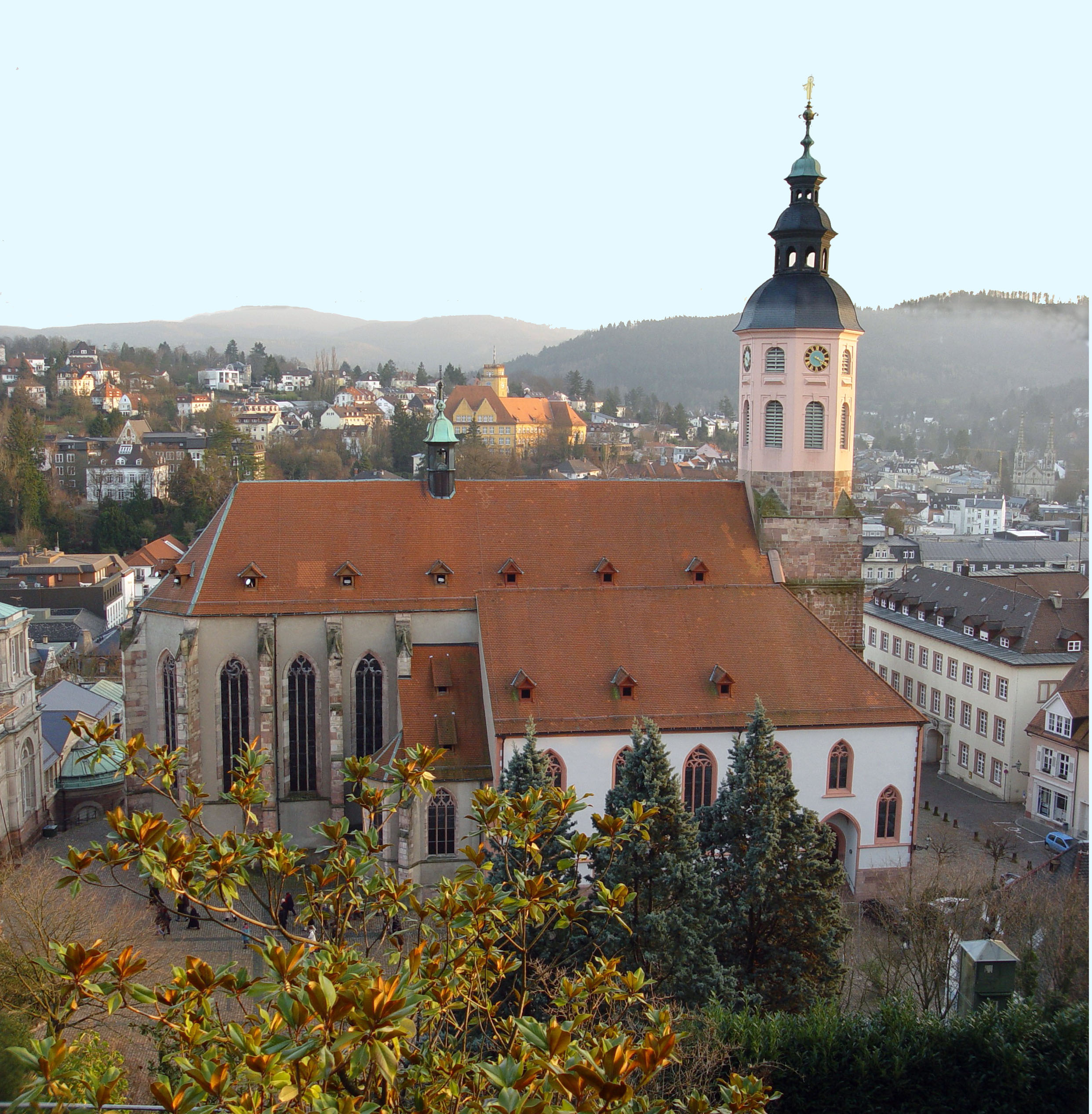
Baden-Baden's parish church (Stiftskirche)

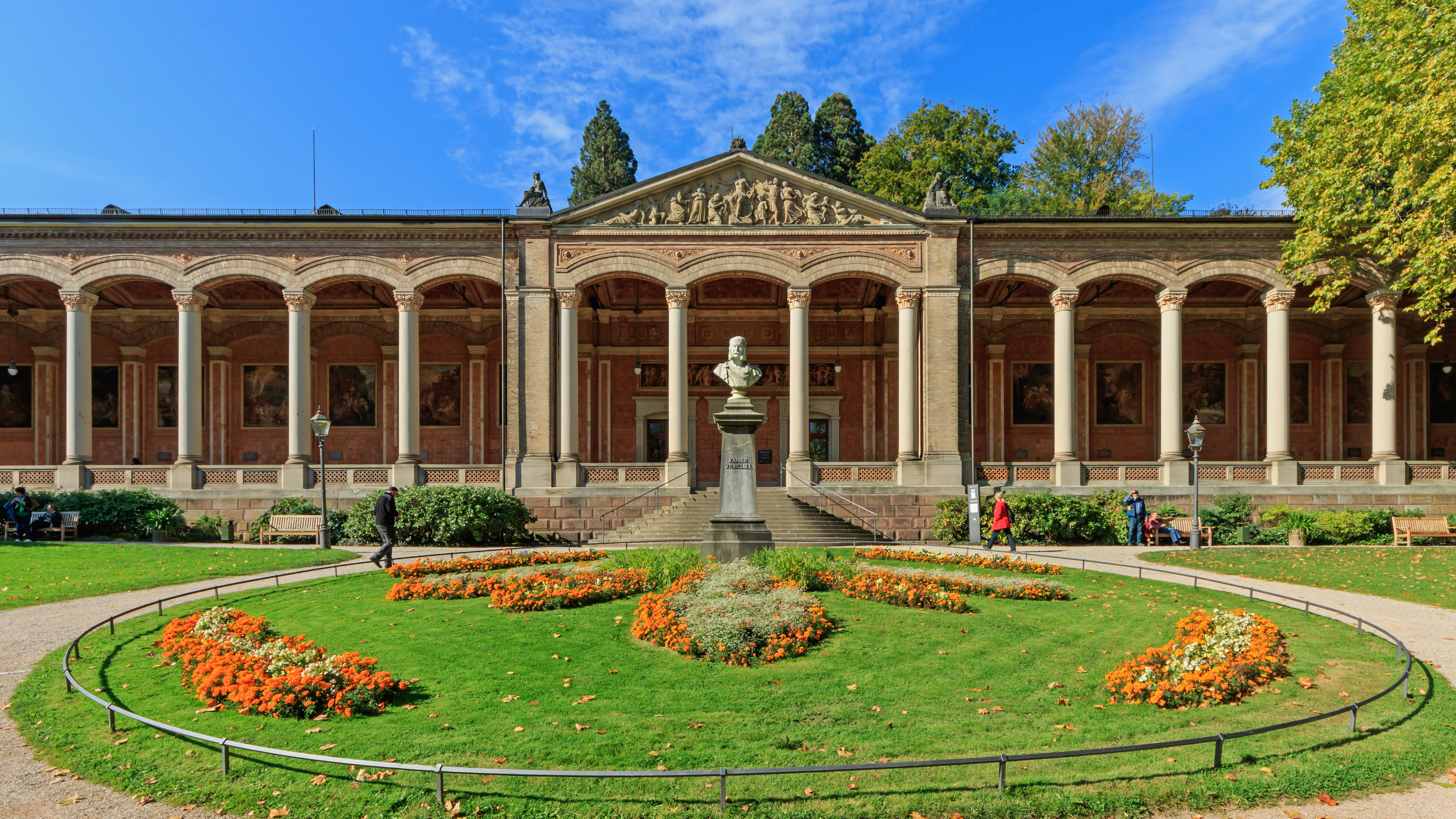
The Trinkhalle

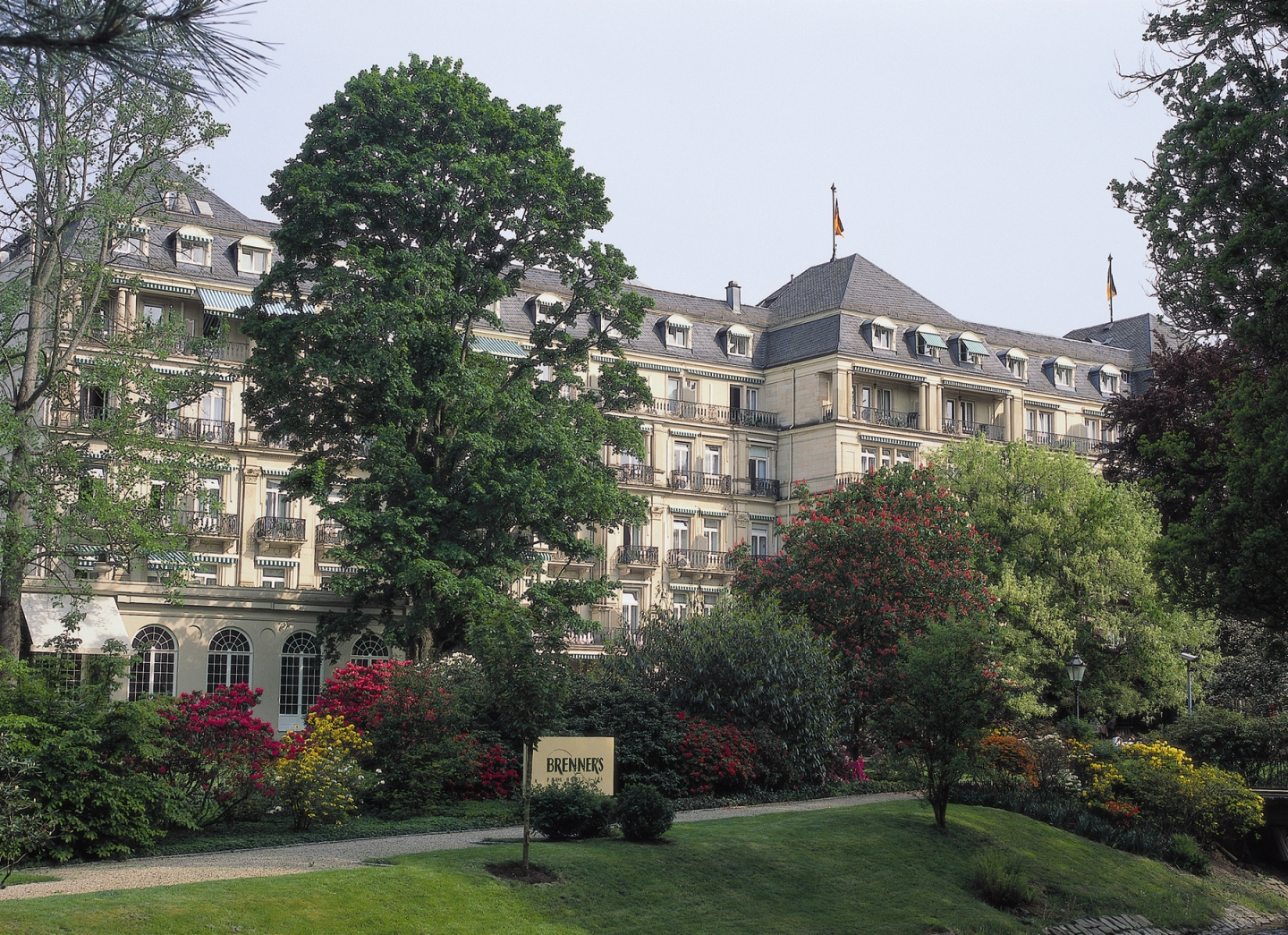
Brenner's Park Hotel

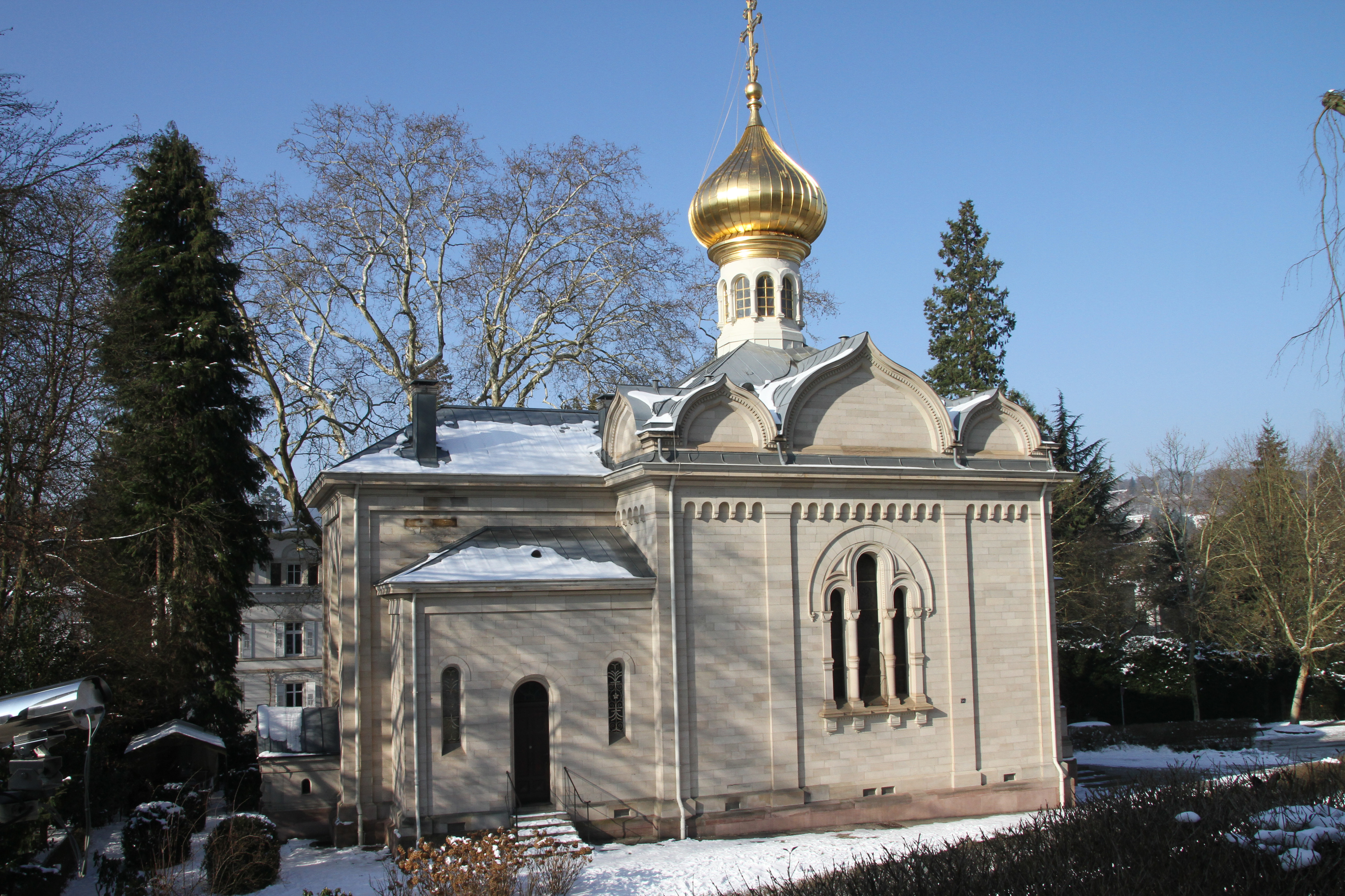
The Russian Orthodox Church (Russische Kirche)

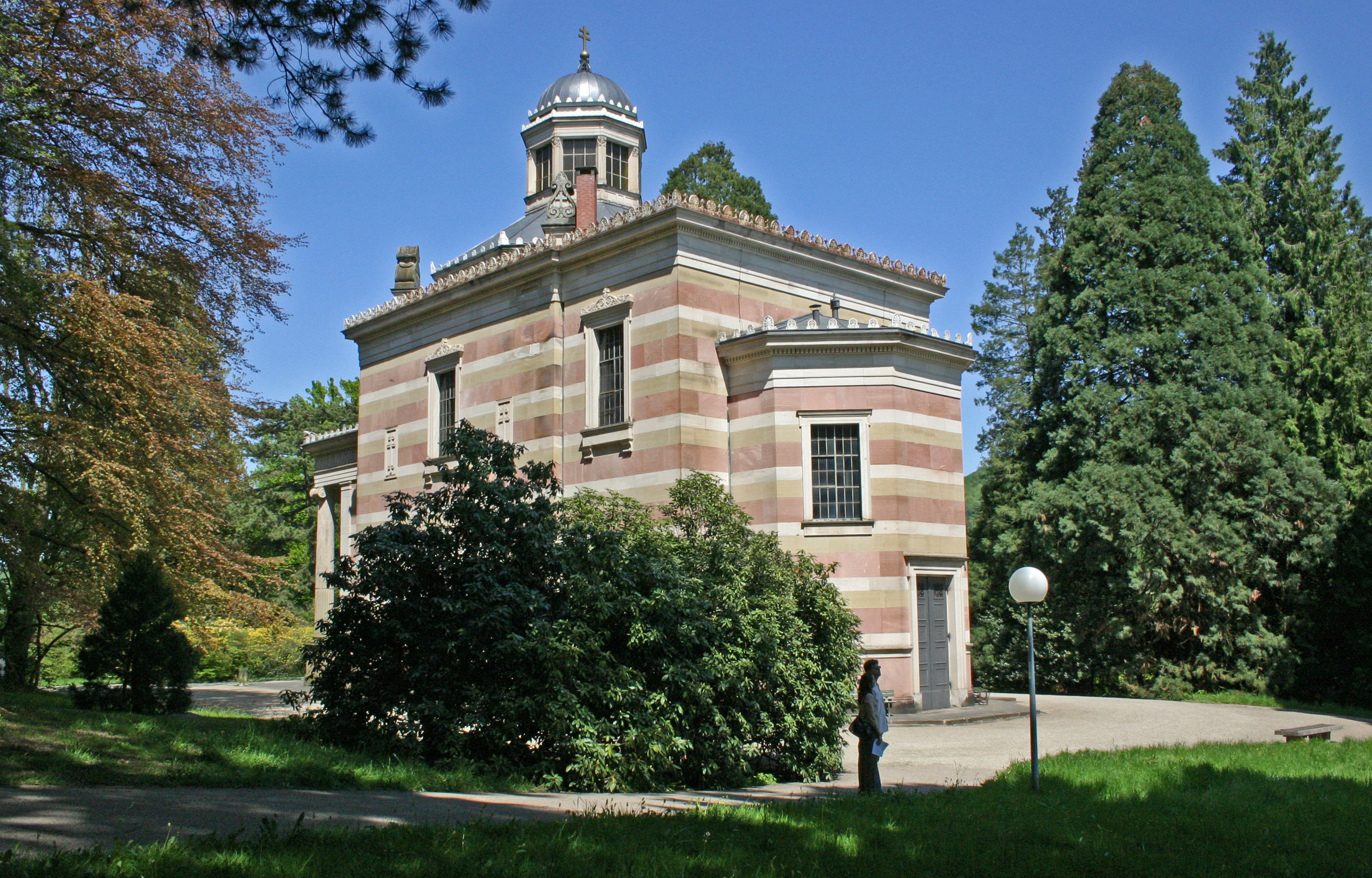
Sturdza Chapel

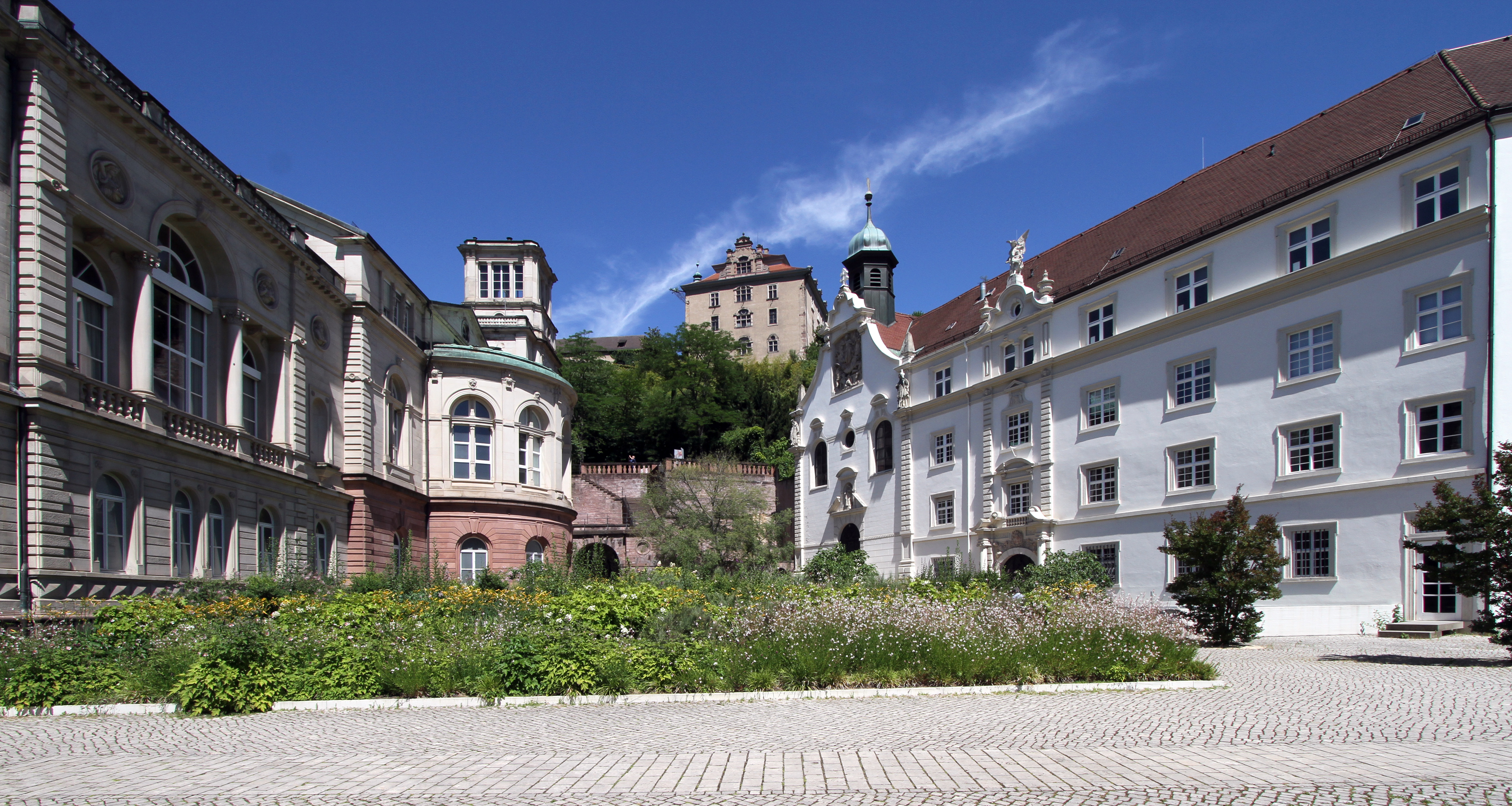
The Friedrichsbad, New Castle, and Abbey School (Klosterschule vom Heiligen Grab)

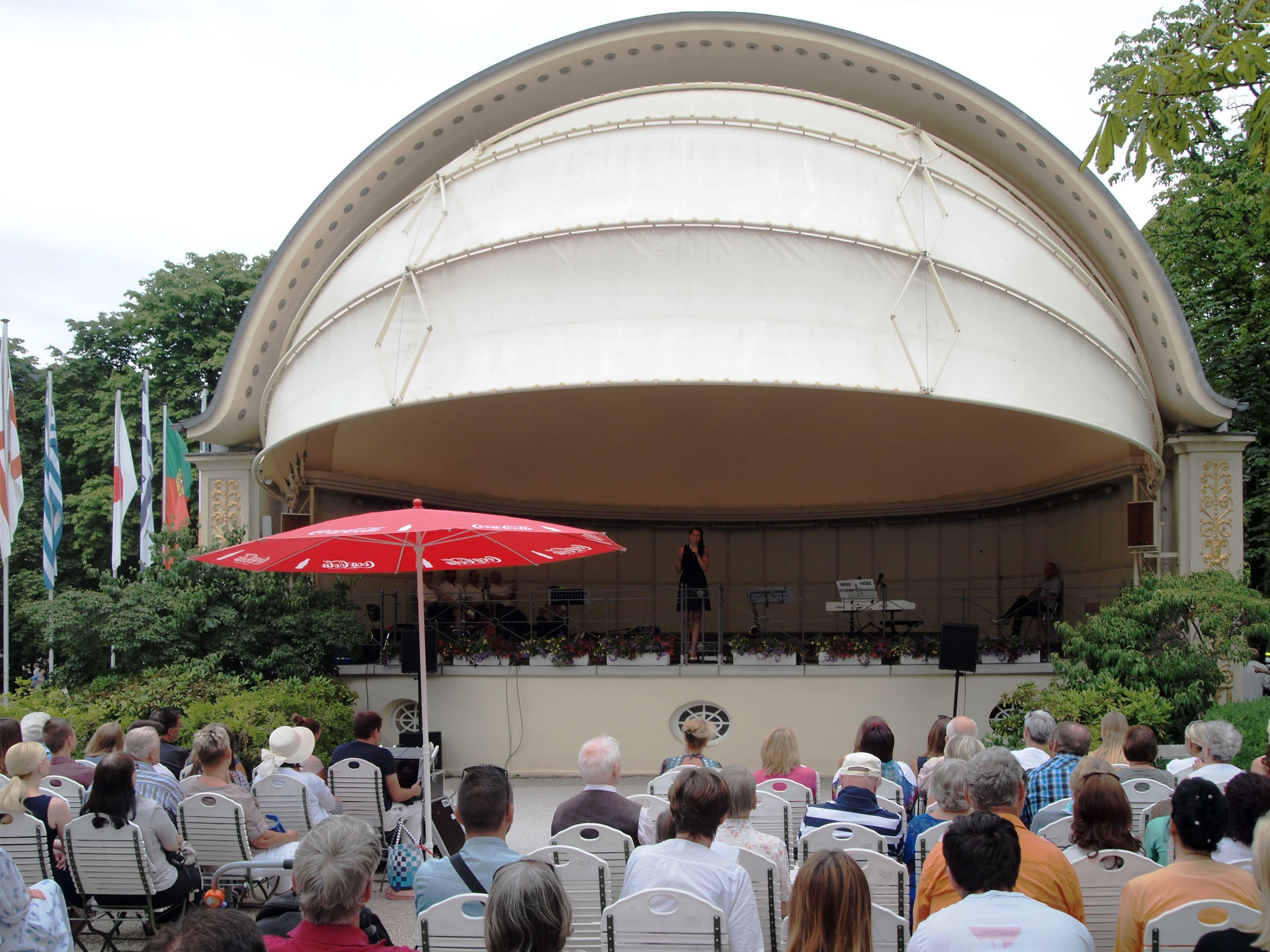
The Spa Shell, an open-air concert venue

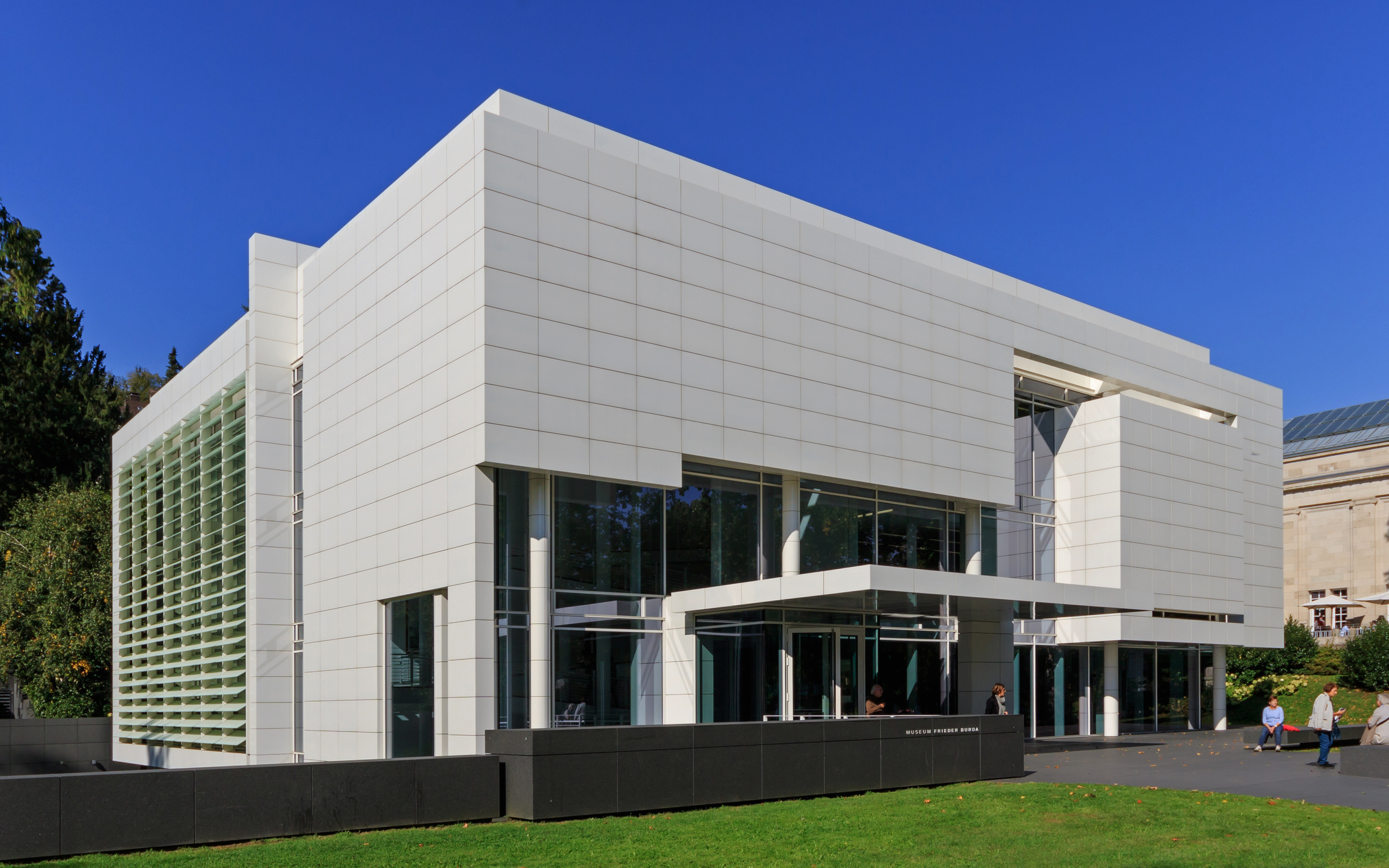
Museum Frieder Burda

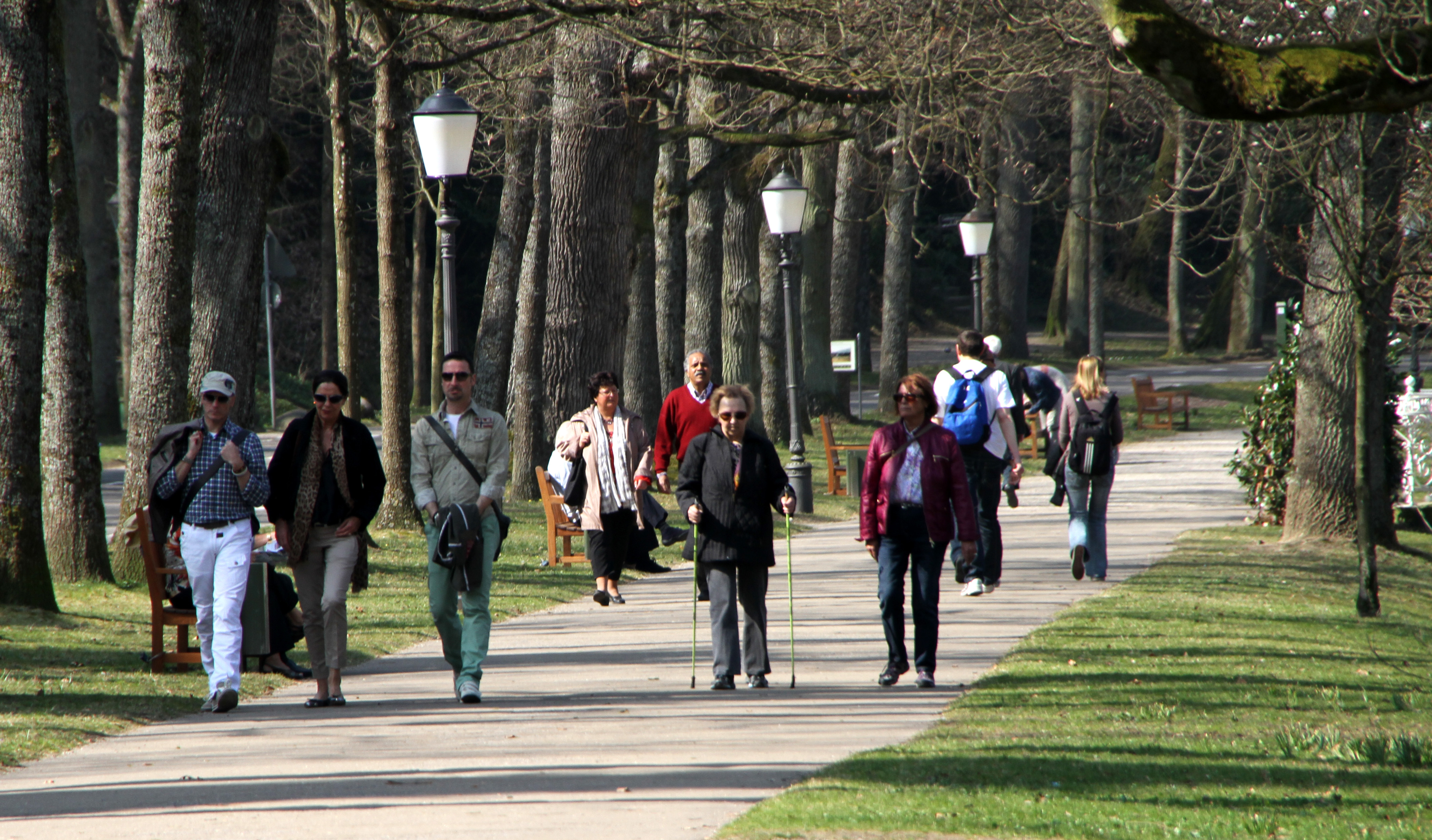
Lichtentaler Allee

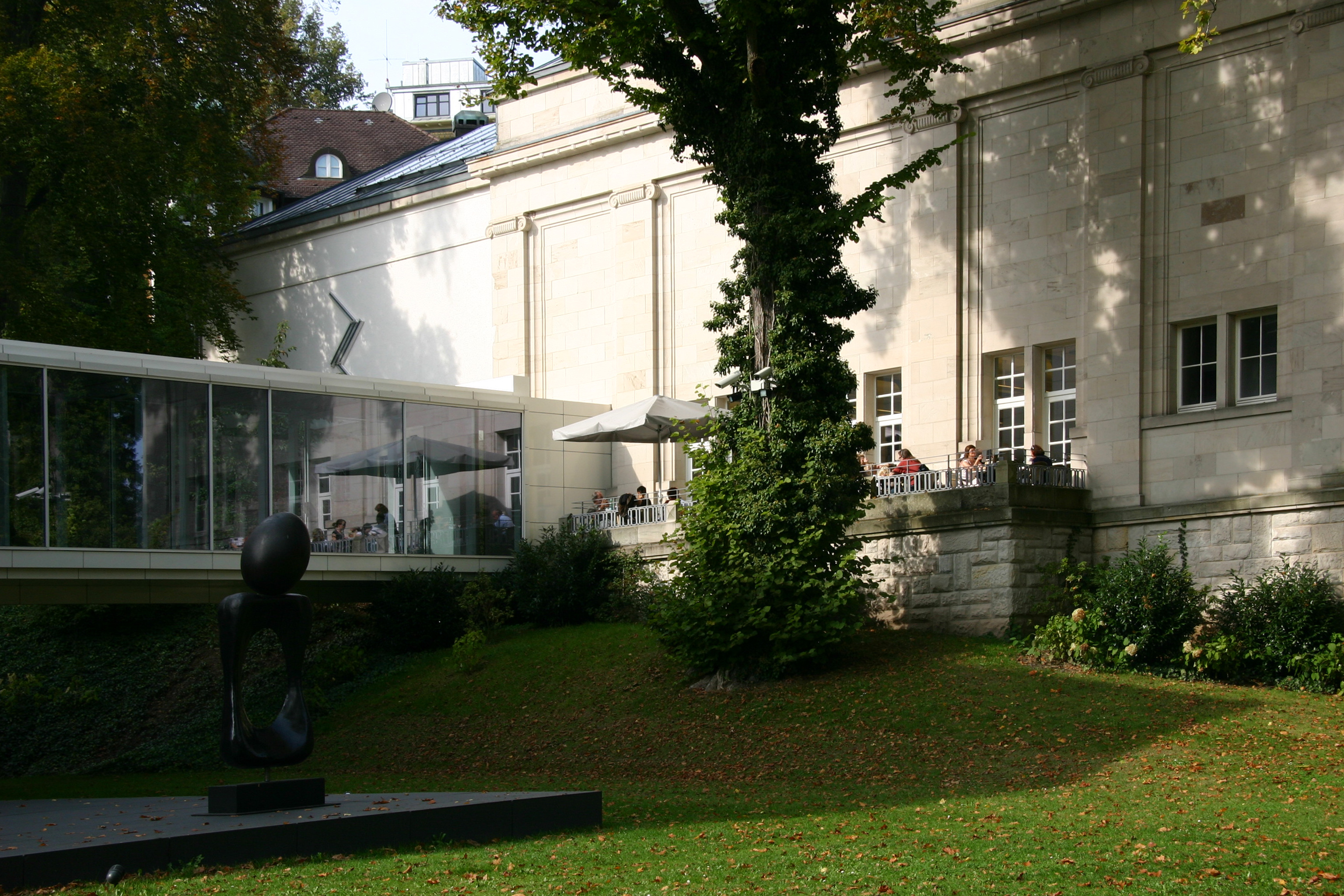
Staatliche Kunsthalle Baden-Baden

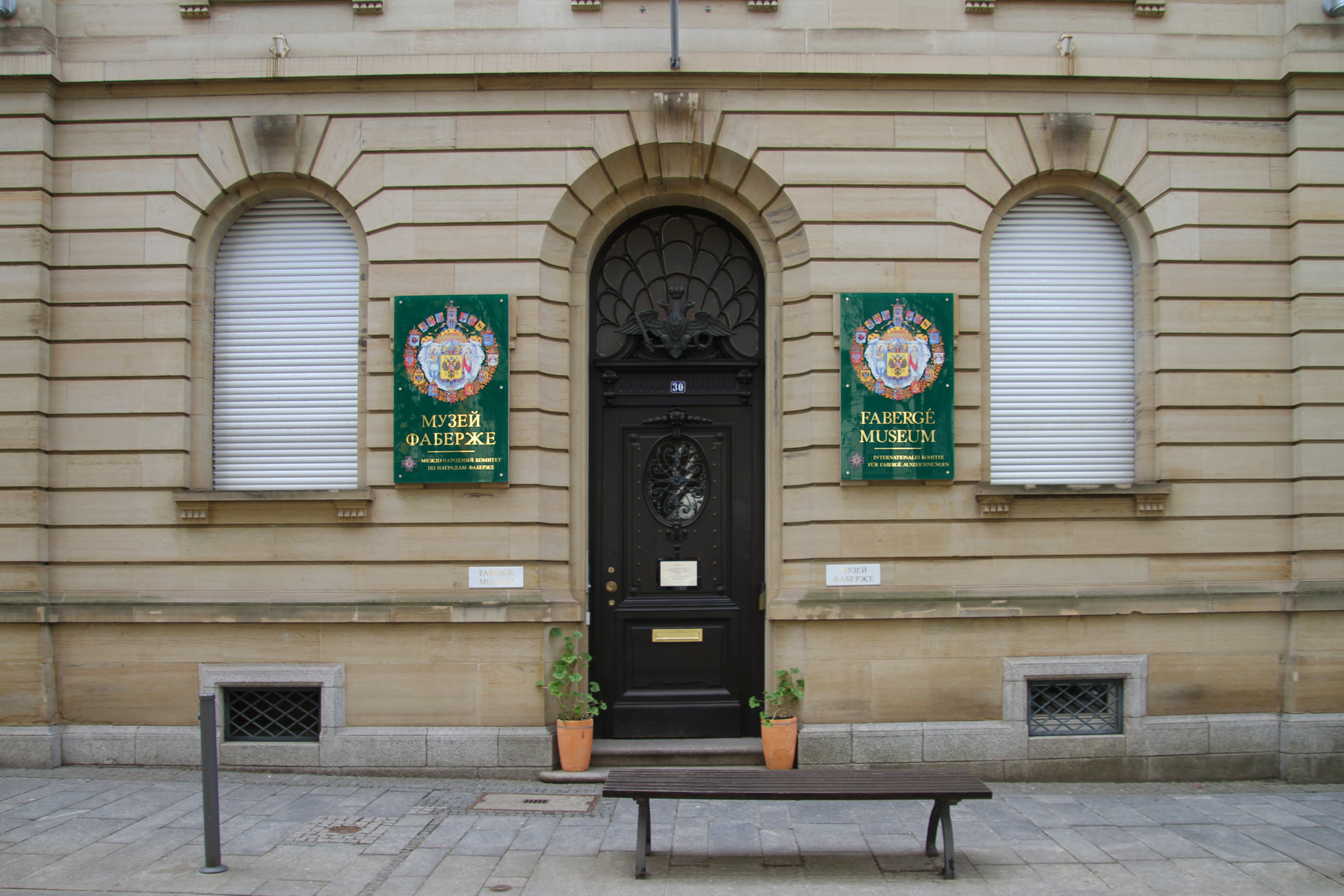
Fabergé Museum

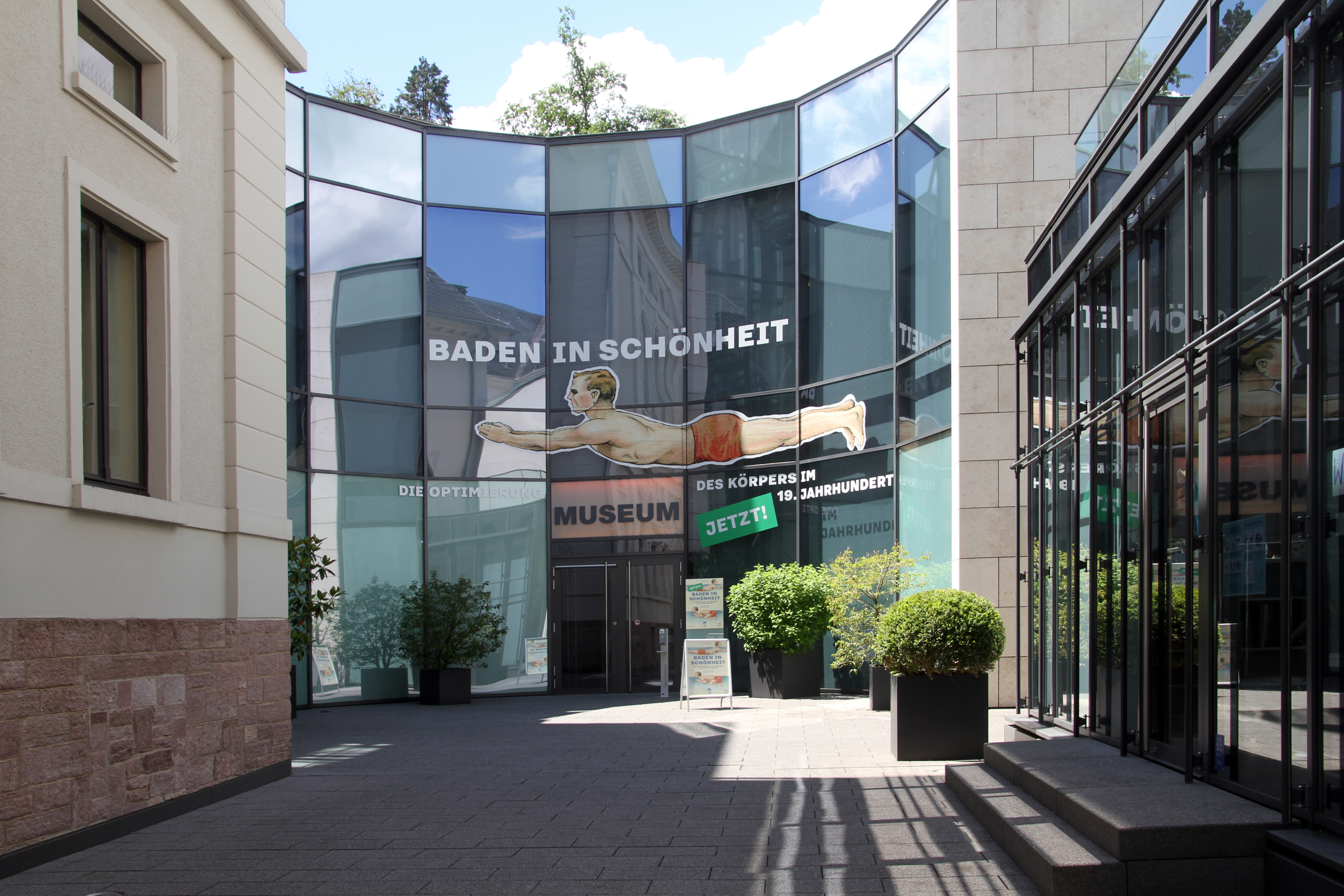
Museum der Kunst und Technik des 19. Jahrhunderts

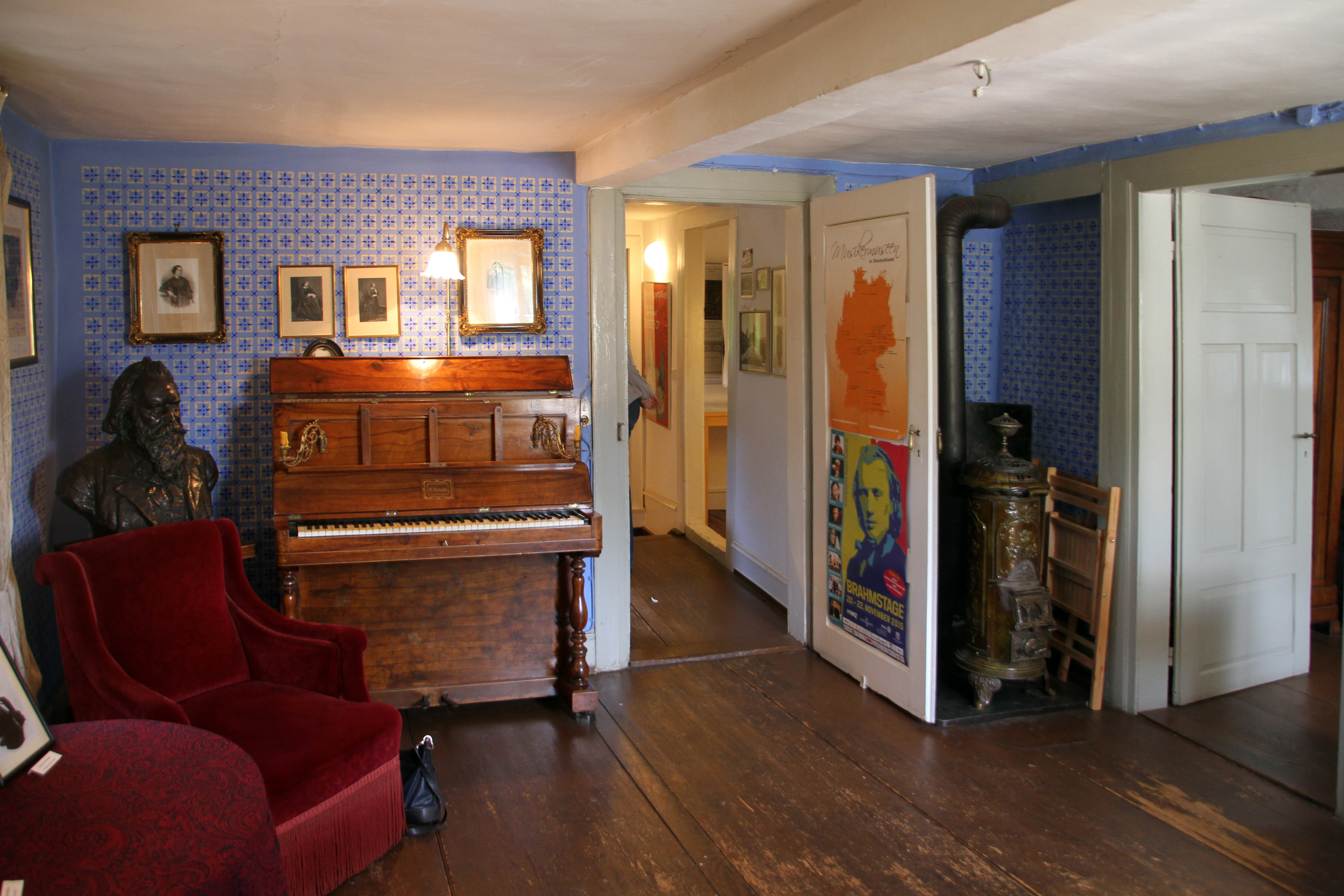
Brahmshaus

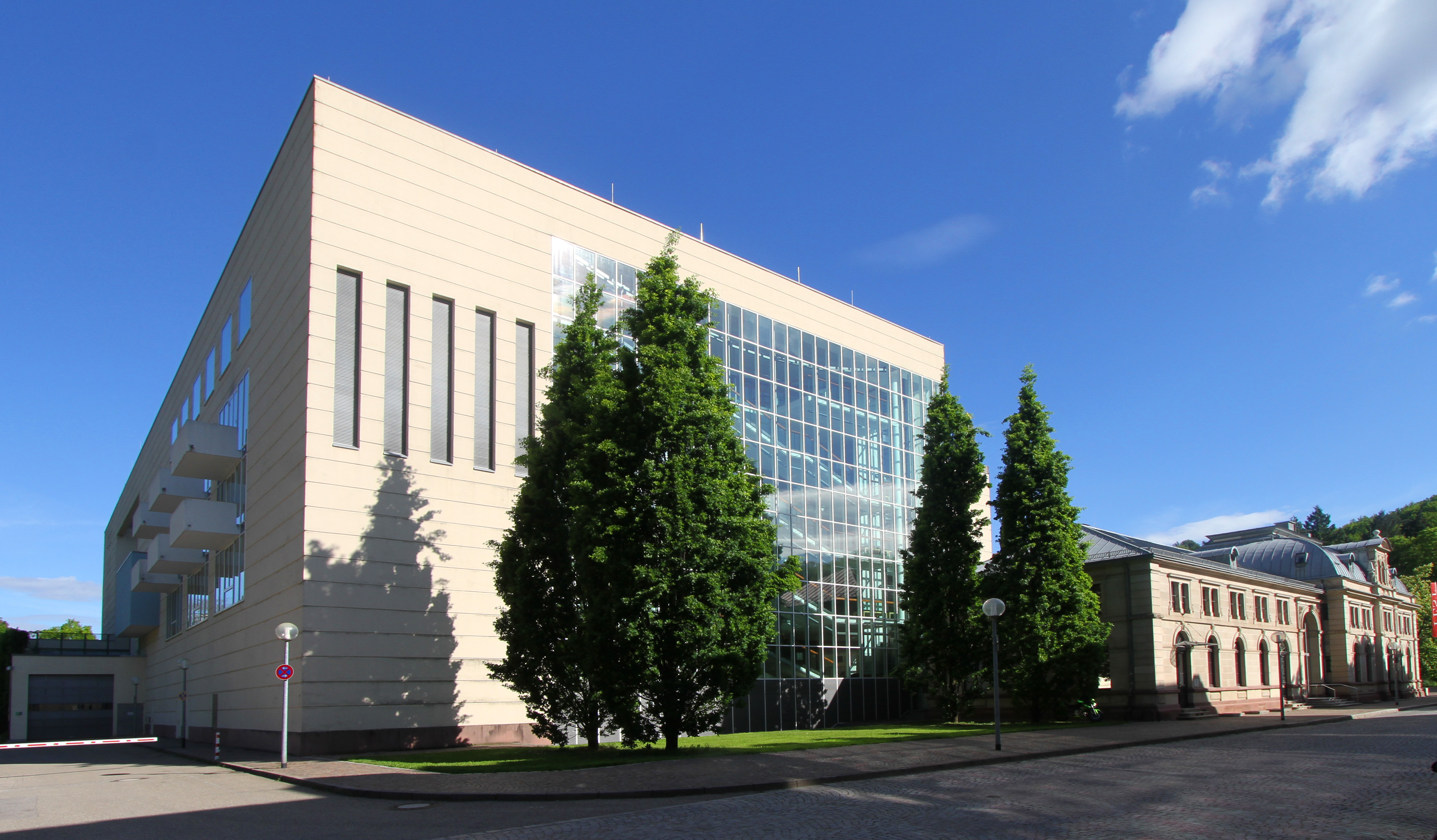
Festspielhaus Baden-Baden

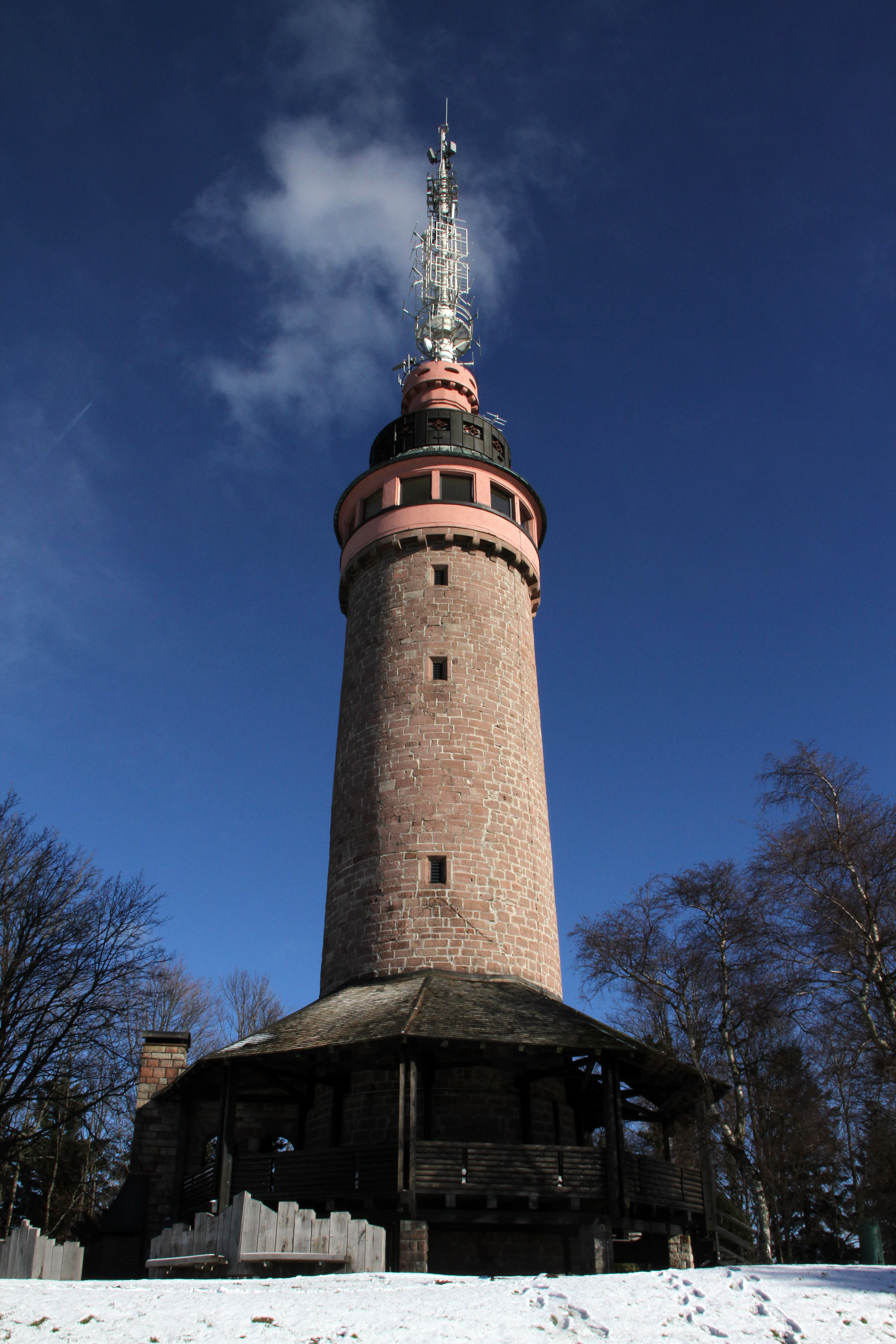
Mount Merkur, tower

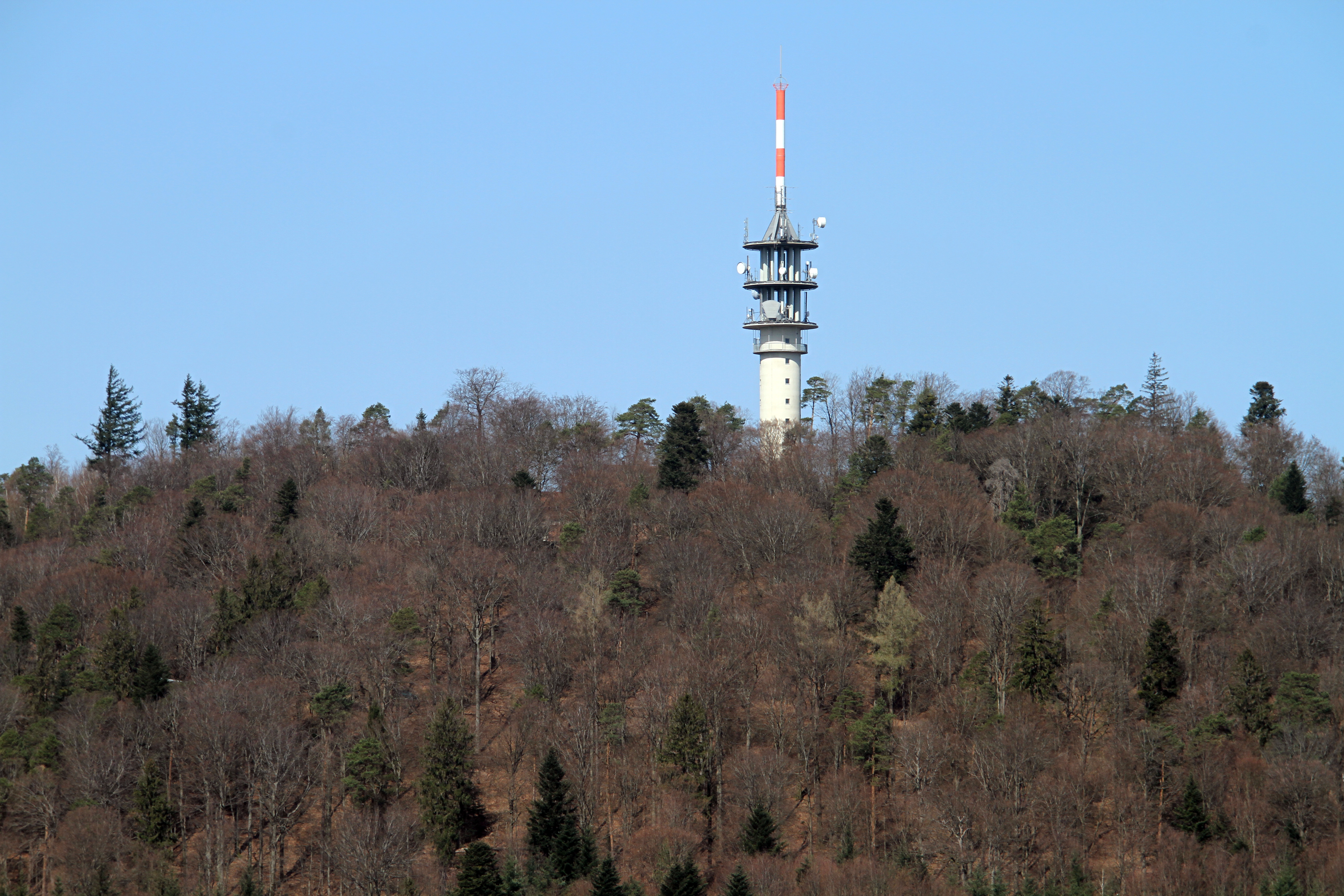
Fremersberg Tower

The Old Castle

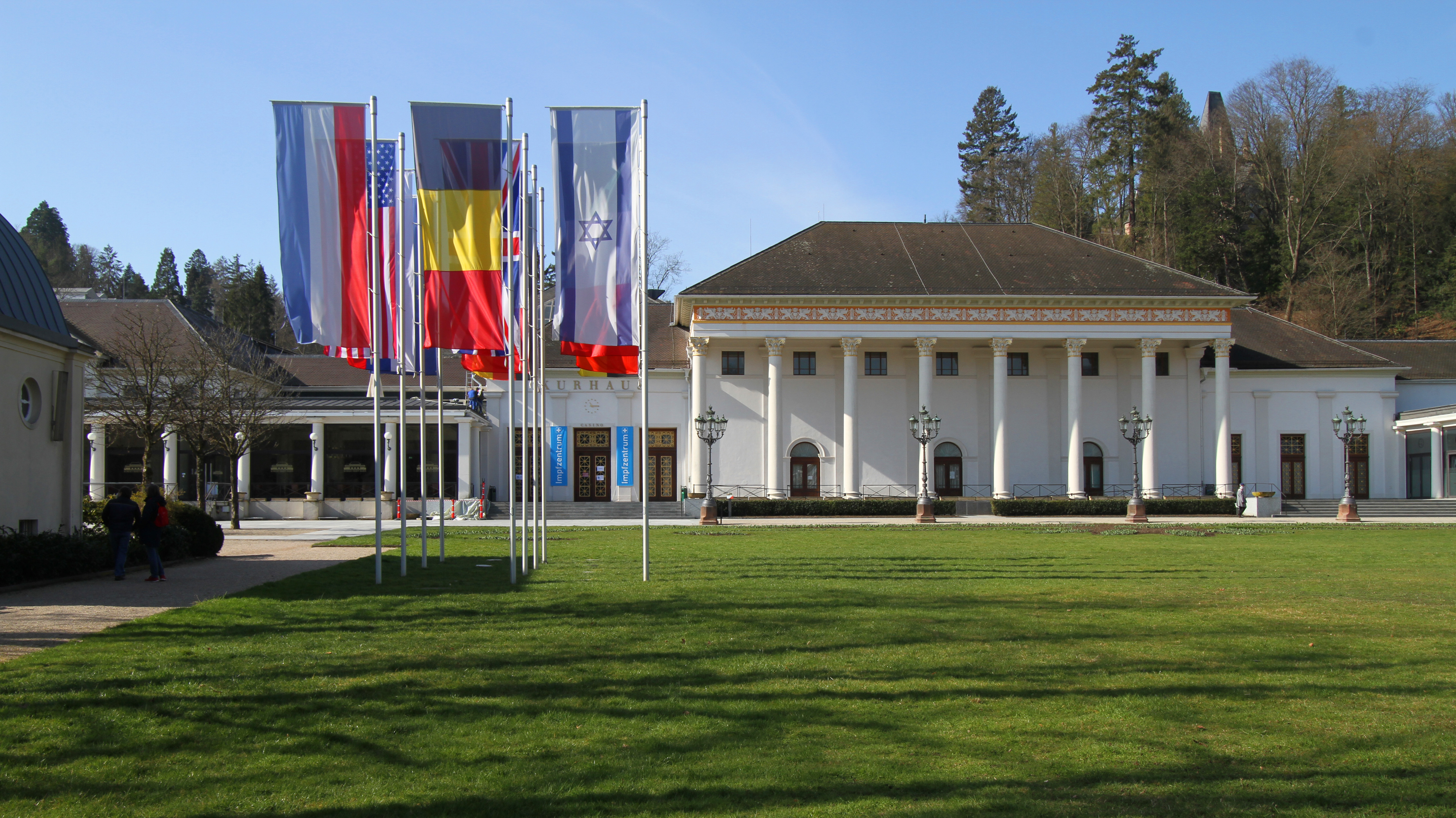
The Kurhaus and Casino

== Twin towns – sister cities ==
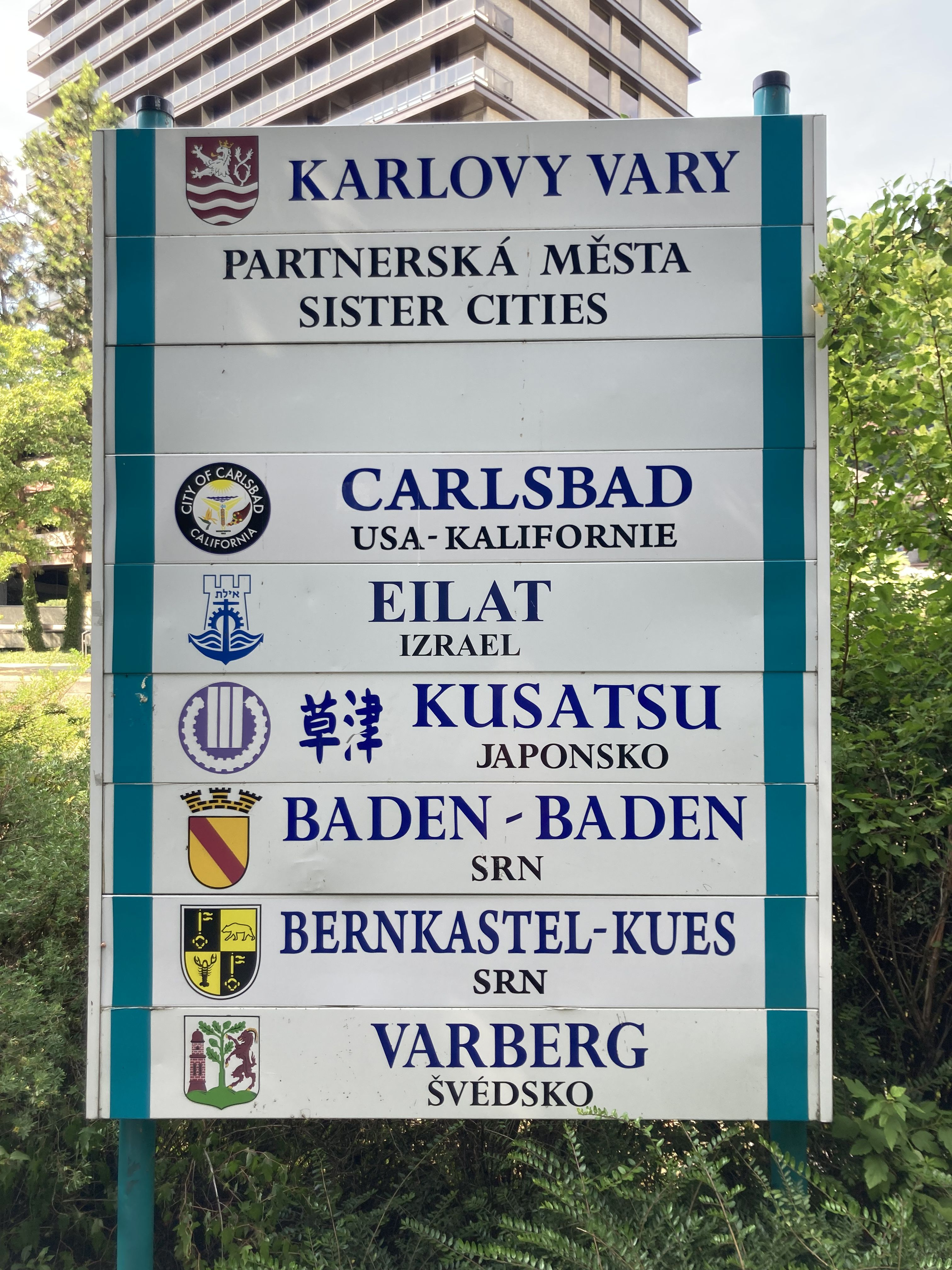
Sign of Karlovy Vary's sister cities

Baden-Baden is twinned with:

- Karlovy Vary, Czech Republic
- Menton, France
- Moncalieri, Italy
- Sochi, Russia (suspended)
- Yalta, Ukraine

== Artistic depiction ==
Baden featured in Turgenev's Smoke. Dostoyevsky wrote The Gambler while compulsively gambling at the town's casino.

The novel Summer in Baden-Baden by Leonid Tsypkin is inspired by Dostoyevsky's visit to this resort.

The 1975 film The Romantic Englishwoman was filmed on location in Baden-Baden, featuring the Brenner's Park Hotel particularly prominently. The 1997 Bollywood movie Dil To Pagal Hai was also shot in the town.

Baden-Baden is the subject of a pop song by Finnish songwriter Chisu of how the economic woes of Finland could be solved by selling bottled tears to Europe (specifically Baden-Baden).

== Notable people ==
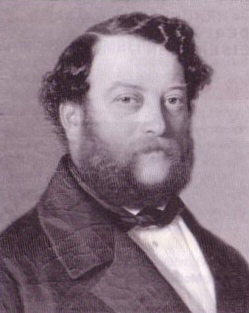
Emil Kessler

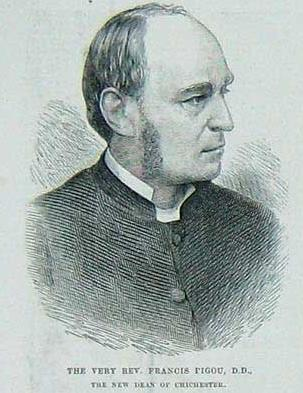
Francis Pigou

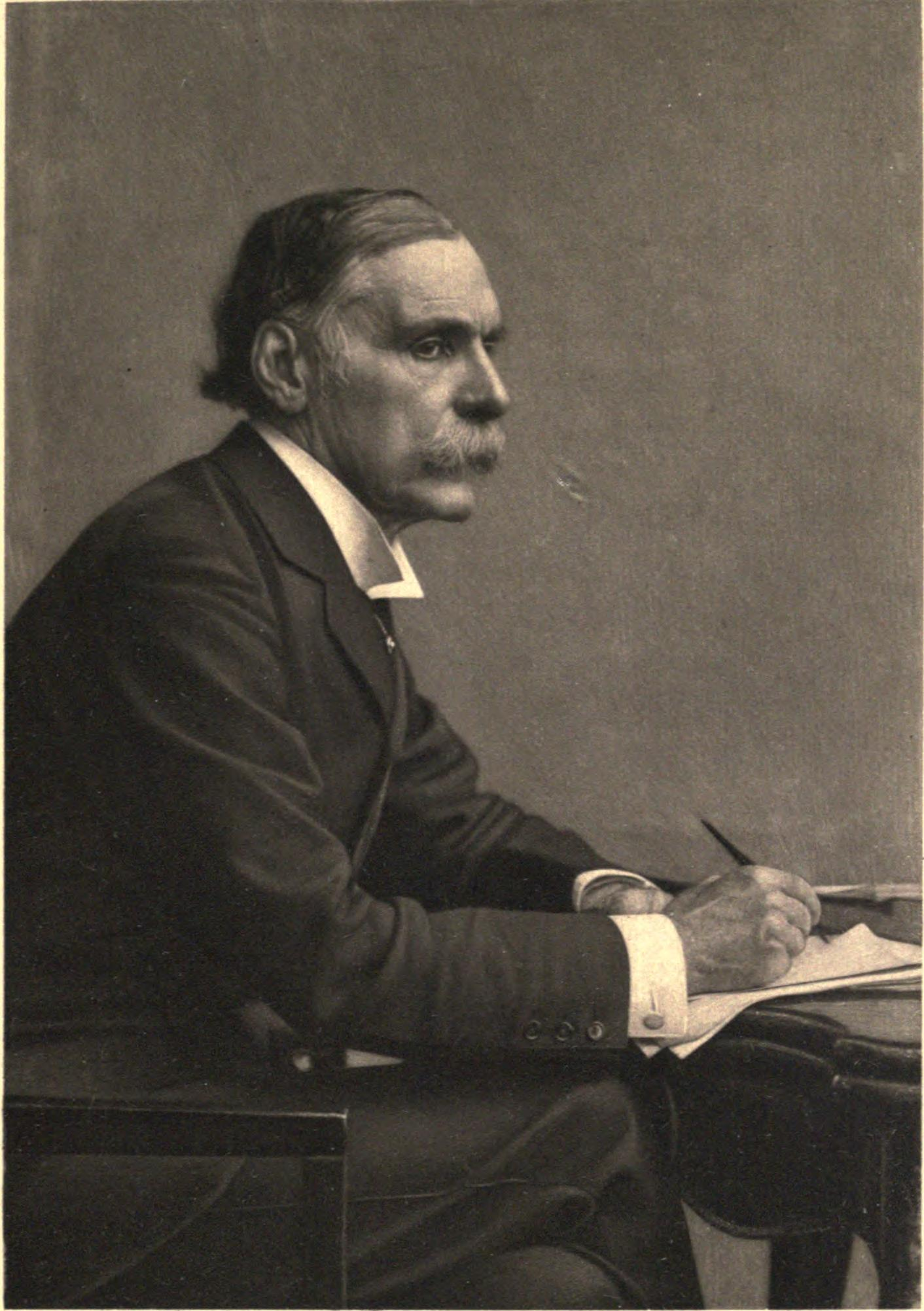
Sir William Des Vœux

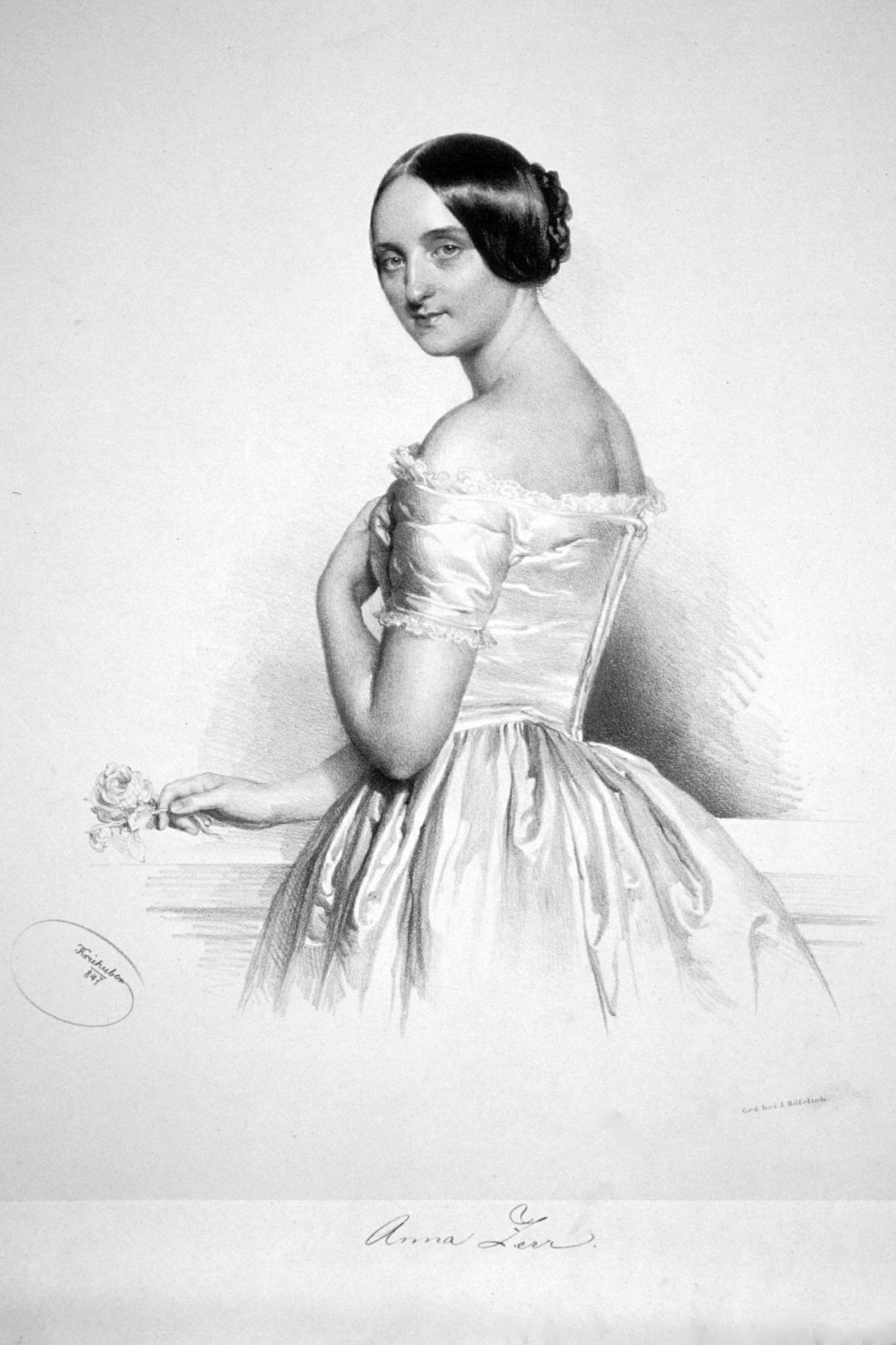
Anna Zerr

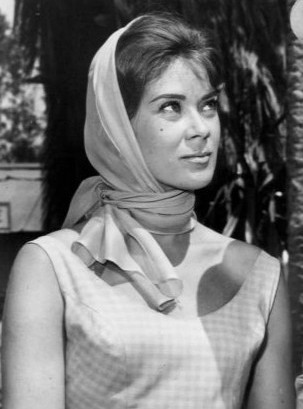
Antoinette Bower, 1961

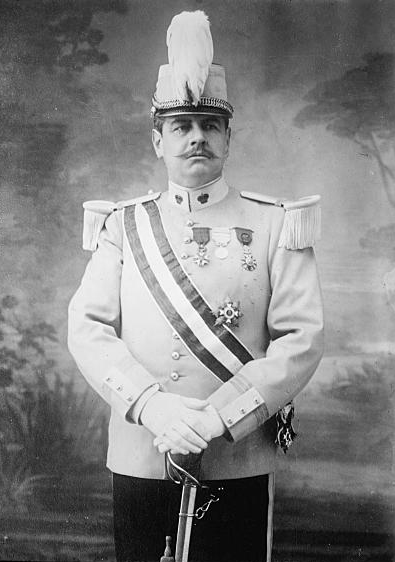
Louis II, Prince of Monaco

=== Public service and commerce ===
- Friedrich, Freiherr von Zoller (1762–1821), Bavarian lieutenant-general who fought in the Napoleonic Wars
- Emil Kessler (1813–1867), entrepreneur, founder of the Maschinenfabrik Esslingen
- Colonel Francis Mahler (1826–1863), officer in the Union Army during the American Civil War
- Richard Enderlin (1843–1930), Union Army, Medal of Honor recipient for rescuing a fallen comrade during the second day of the Battle of Gettysburg during the American Civil War
- William Hespeler (1830–1921), German-Canadian businessman, immigration agent and a member of the Legislative Assembly of Manitoba
- Francis Pigou (1832–1916), Anglican priest
- Sir William Des Vœux (1834–1909), British colonial governor, Governor of Fiji (1880–1885), Governor of Newfoundland (1886–1887) and Governor of Hong Kong (1887–1891)
- Wilhelm Brückner (1884–1954), officer and chief adjutant of Adolf Hitler
- Rudolf Höss (1900–1947), Nazi, SS commandant of Auschwitz concentration camp, executed for war crimes
- Leopold Gutterer (1902–1996), Nazi state secretary in the Reich Ministry of Public Enlightenment and Propaganda
- Felix Gilbert (1905–1991), German-American historian
- Fritz Suhren (1908–1950), SS Nazi concentration camp commandant executed for war crimes
- Kai Whittaker (born 1985), German CDU politician, member of the Bundestag since 2013

=== The arts ===
- Anna Zerr (1822–1881), German operatic soprano
- Eugene Armbruster (1865–1943), New York City photographer, illustrator, writer, and historian
- Paul Nikolaus Cossmann (1869–1942 in Theresienstadt), German journalist
- Hermine Finck (1872–1932), opera singer
- Édouard Risler (1873–1929), French pianist
- Reinhold Schneider (1903–1958), writer
- Franz Zureich (1904–1992), painter
- Antoinette Bower (born 1932), British-American actress
- Tony Marshall (1938–2023), pop and opera singer
- Heinz Bosl (1946–1975), German ballet dancer
- Elmar Hörig (born 1949), radio and television presenter
- Robert HP Platz (born 1951), composer and conductor
- Sabine von Maydell (born 1955), actress and author
- Marc Trillard (born 1955), French writer
- Andreas Heinecke (born 1955), social entrepreneur and creator of Dialogue in the Dark
- Jean-Marc Rochette (born 1956), French painter, illustrator and comics creator.
- Tobias A. Schliessler (born 1958), German cinematographer
- Ann-Marie MacDonald (born 1958), Canadian playwright, novelist, actress and broadcast host
- Stefan Anton Reck (born 1960), German orchestra conductor and painter
- Birgit Stauch (born 1961), German sculptor, works in bronzes, sculptures, sketches and portraits.
- Florian Ballhaus (born 1965), German cinematographer
- Alexandra Kamp (born 1966), German model and actress, grew up in Baden-Baden.

=== Aristocracy ===
- Philip II, Margrave of Baden-Baden (1559–1588), Margrave of Baden-Baden, 1571 to 1588
- William, Margrave of Baden-Baden (1593–1677), regent of Baden-Baden, 1621 and 1677
- Ferdinand Maximilian of Baden-Baden (1625–1669), father of the "Türkenlouis" Louis William, Margrave of Baden-Baden
- Prince Maximilian of Baden (1867–1929), last heir of the Grand Duchy of Baden, a German prince, general and politician
- Frederick Lindemann, 1st Viscount Cherwell (1886–1957), British physicist
- Louis II, Prince of Monaco (1870–1949), Prince of Monaco from 1922 to 1949

=== Science ===
- Robert Koch (1843–1910), physician and microbiologist
- Franz Carl Müller-Lyer (1857–1916), psychologist and sociologist, eponym of the Müller-Lyer illusion
- Joseph Vollmer (1871–1955), automobile designer, engineer and pioneering tank designer
- Alfred Kühn (1885–1968), zoologist and geneticist
- Erich Friedrich Schmidt (1897–1964), German and American-naturalized archaeologist
- Wolfgang Krull (1899–1971), mathematician

=== Sport ===
- Marco Grimm (born 1972), football player, 334 pro appearances
- Frank Moser (born 1976), German professional tennis player
- Magdalena Schnurr (born 1992), German ski jumper

== See also ==
- List of reduplicated place names

== Bibliography ==
- Baynes, T. S., ed. (1878), "Baden (2.)" , Encyclopædia Britannica, vol. 3 (9th ed.), New York: Charles Scribner's Sons, pp. 226–227
- Chisholm, Hugh, ed. (1911), "Baden" , Encyclopædia Britannica, vol. 3 (11th ed.), Cambridge University Press, p. 184
- "Baden-Baden", Encyclopædia Britannica Online, 2015.
