= Botanical Garden of the KIT =

Garden in Germany

Coordinates: 49.0129°N 8.4191°E

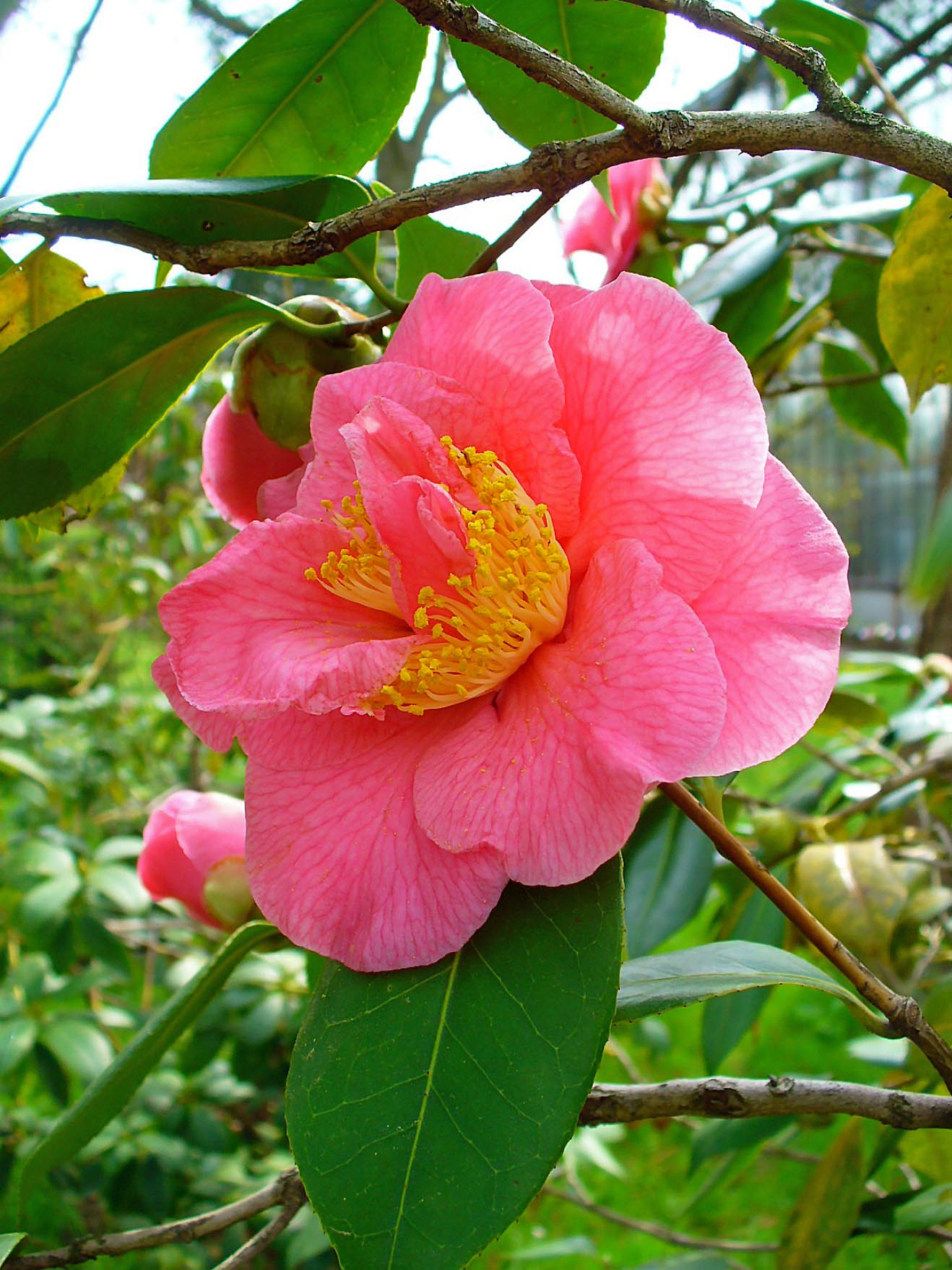
Camellia japonica at the Botanical Garden of the KIT

The Botanical Garden of the KIT, originally the Botanischer Garten der Universität Karlsruhe, is a botanical garden maintained by the Karlsruhe Institute of Technology and under the directorate of Peter Nick. It is located at Am Fasanengarten 2, Karlsruhe, Baden-Württemberg, Germany.

The garden contains a total of 5,700 plant species, including 1,930 endangered species per the IUCN Red List or CITES conventions. It has three major missions:

- Research, particularly in understanding the molecular basis of development, growth, and metabolism, with specific projects in Arabidopsis thaliana, Gnetum gnemon, Nicotiana tabacum, Oryza sativa, and Vitis vinifera. The garden currently cultivates over 50 species of wild grape vines for use in research against downy mildew, as well as a collection of wild rice species from all over the world.
- Teaching, for which the garden provides plant material for the courses and is used for field trips and the comparison of plant types.
- Conservation of rare species and varieties of plants, including Althaea hirsuta, Androsace septentivionalis, Apium graveolens, Campanula cervicaria, Cnidium dubium, Equisetum × trachyodon, Gentiana cruziata, Leonurus cardica, Ludwigia palustris, Marsilea quadrifolia, Polystichum braunii, Populus nigra, Salix repens, Scirpus carinatus, Scirpus triqueter, Stipa ioannis, Taraxacum acoriferum, Taraxacum balticiforme, Taraxacum germanicum, Taraxacum pollichii, Trapa natans, Vaccinium x intermedia, Viola uliginosa, and Vitis vinifera L. ssp. sylvestris. It also maintains good collections of succulents and orchids.

== See also ==
- Botanischer Garten Karlsruhe, the municipal botanical garden
- List of botanical gardens in Germany
