= Agonopterix quadripunctata =

Scientific classification
- Kingdom: Animalia
- Phylum: Arthropoda
- Clade: Pancrustacea
- Class: Insecta
- Order: Lepidoptera
- Family: Depressariidae
- Genus: Agonopterix
- Species: A. quadripunctata

Binomial name
- Agonopterix quadripunctata (Wocke, 1857)

Synonyms
- Depressaria quadripunctata Wocke, 1857

Species of moth

Agonopterix quadripunctata is a moth of the family Depressariidae. It is found in Fennoscandia, Estonia, Latvia, Russia, Germany, Poland, the Czech Republic, Slovakia, Italy and North Macedonia.

The wingspan is 15–18 mm. Adults are on wing from May to August.

The larvae feed on Seseli and Cnidium species, including Cnidium dubium.
