= List of presidential trips made by Barack Obama (2009) =

This is a list of presidential trips made by Barack Obama during 2009, the first year of his presidency as the 44th president of the United States. Following his inauguration on January 20, 2009, Obama traveled to 22 different states internationally, in addition to many more trips made domestically within the United States.

This list excludes trips made within Washington, D.C., the U.S. federal capital in which the White House, the official residence and principal workplace of the president, is located. Additionally excluded are trips to Camp David, the country residence of the president, and to the private home of the Obama family in Kenwood, Chicago.

== January ==
- No trips made.

== February ==
Country/ U.S. state	Areas visited	Dates	Details	Image
Virginia	Williamsburg	February 5	First presidential trip using Air Force One.	P020509PS-0455 (3484821614)
Indiana	Elkhart	February 9	President Obama was promoting the American Recovery and Reinvestment Act of 2009.	
Florida	Fort Myers	February 10	President Obama was promoting the American Recovery and Reinvestment Act of 2009.	
Virginia	Springfield	February 11	President Obama promoted the economic stimulus plan at a construction site with then-DNC Chairman and former Virginia governor Tim Kaine.	
Illinois	Springfield	February 12	President Obama participated in the celebrations for the bicentennial anniversary of the birth of Abraham Lincoln.	
Colorado	Denver	February 17	President Obama, accompanied by Vice President Joe Biden, traveled to Denver, Colorado, to sign the American Recovery and Reinvestment Act of 2009 into law.	Barack Obama speaks with CEO of Namaste Solar Electric, Inc., Blake Jones, while looking at solar panels in Denver, Col., 2009
Arizona	Mesa	February 18	President Obama makes remarks on the mortgage crisis at Dobson High School, in Mesa, Arizona	
Canada	Ottawa	February 19	First trip outside the United States as president. President Obama met with Governor General Michaëlle Jean, Prime Minister Stephen Harper and Leader of the Opposition Michael Ignatieff.	
North Carolina	Jacksonville	February 27	President Obama announced withdrawal plans for US troops in Iraq.	P022709PS-0106 (3484015965)

== March ==
Country/ U.S. state	Areas visited	Dates	Details	Image
Ohio	Columbus	March 6	President Obama visited Columbus, Ohio, and made a speech at the graduation of Columbus Police Division's 114th class.	United States President Barack Obama with Senator Sherrod Brown, Representative Mary Jo Kilroy, and Secret Service personnel arriving at Port Columbus International Airport
California	Long Beach, San Diego, Pomona, Los Angeles, Costa Mesa	March 18–20	President Obama took part in two town hall sessions and visited the Edison International Vehicle Electrics plant during his visit to California.	P031809PS-0622 (3484026325)

== April ==
Country/ U.S. state	Areas visited	Dates	Details	Image
United Kingdom	London	March 31 – April 2	President Obama was attending the G-20 summit meeting. Obama met with Prime Minister Gordon Brown at 10 Downing Street, where he took part in a joint press conference with Brown, and met with Leader of the Opposition David Cameron at the U.S. Embassy in Grosvenor Square. Obama also met with Queen Elizabeth II.	
France	Strasbourg	April 3–4	President Obama was attending the NATO summit meeting.	Barack Obama and Nicolas Sarkozy in Strasbourg April 2009
Germany	Kehl, Baden-Baden	April 3–4	President Obama was attending the NATO summit meeting	
Czech Republic	Prague	April 5	President Obama visited the Czech Republic, then holding the rotating presidency of the European Council. President Obama met with President Václav Klaus. He also made a speech in Hradčany Square, Prague, in which he spoke about the threat of nuclear weapons in the post–Cold War era.	Mirek Topolánek, Barack Obama and Václav Klaus at Prague Castle 2009-04-05
Turkey	Ankara, Istanbul	April 6–7	President Obama participated in a wreath laying ceremony at Anitkabir Mausoleum, met with President Abdullah Gül and Prime Minister Recep Tayyip Erdoğan, and delivered a speech to the Grand National Assembly of Turkey. Obama also met with Ecumenical Patriarch Bartholomew I of Constantinople of the Eastern Orthodox Church in Istanbul, attended the Alliance of Civilizations forum, a forum sponsored by Turkey and Spain to promote understanding between the Western and Islamic worlds, visited the Hagia Sophia and Blue Mosque and hold a town hall with students at the Tophane Cultural Center.	Walking with Turkish Prime Minister Recep Tayyip Erdogan from Hagia Sofia to the Blue Mosque in Istanbul, Turkey, April 7, 2009
Iraq	Baghdad	April 7	President Obama met with President Jalal Talabani and Prime Minister Nouri al-Maliki. He also visited U.S. soldiers fighting in the Iraq War.	Barack Obama & Nouri al-Maliki in Baghdad 4-7-09 2
Mexico	Mexico City	April 16–17	President Obama met with President Felipe Calderón.	
Trinidad and Tobago	Port of Spain	April 17–19	President Obama was attending the 5th Summit of the Americas.	Barack Obama and Óscar Arias Sánchez
Iowa	Newton, Iowa	April 22	President Obama delivered remarks at the Trinity Structural Towers Manufacturing Plant.	P042209PS-0317 (3484866816)

== May ==
Country/ U.S. state	Areas visited	Dates	Details	Image
Arizona	Phoenix	May 13	President Obama visited Arizona State University to give a commencement address.	P051309CK-0475 (3583549796)
New Mexico	Albuquerque	May 14	President Obama visited Rio Rancho High School to discuss credit card reform.	P051409CK-0194 (3582754083)
Indiana	South Bend	May 17	President Obama visited the University of Notre Dame to give a commencement address.	P051709PS-0459 (3582759805)
Maryland	Annapolis	May 22	President Obama visited the United States Naval Academy to give a commencement address.	P052209PS-0483 (3582768879)
Virginia	Arlington	May 25	President Obama participated in Memorial Day ceremonies at Arlington National Cemetery.	
Nevada	Las Vegas Valley	May 26	President Obama made a speech at a fundraiser for the re-election campaign of Senate Majority Leader Harry Reid.	P052609PS-0568 (3599212962)
California	Beverly Hills	May 27	President Obama delivered remarks at a fundraiser for the Democratic National Committee at The Beverly Hilton.	P052709PS-0528 (3599213242)
New York	New York City	May 30	No official business. President and First Lady dined at Blue Hill and attended the Broadway revival of Joe Turner's Come and Gone.	

== June ==
Country/ U.S. state	Areas visited	Dates	Details	Image
Saudi Arabia	Riyadh Province	June 3–4	President Obama met with King Abdullah and discussed various issues, including the Arab–Israeli conflict and Iran's nuclear programme.	President Barack Obama receives the King Abdul Aziz Order of Merit on June 3, 2009.
Egypt	Cairo, Giza	June 4	President Obama issued an important speech to the Muslim world at Cairo University entitled "A New Beginning". Obama also held talks with President Hosni Mubarak on regional issues, which were described by Mubarak as "candid and frank". Obama also visited the Sultan Hassan Mosque.	
Germany	Dresden, Buchenwald, Landstuhl	June 5	President Obama visited the Buchenwald concentration camp, ahead of the D-Day commemorations, and Landstuhl Regional Medical Center. He also spoke of the Arab–Israeli conflict, and met with Chancellor Angela Merkel in Dresden Castle, visited Dresden Frauenkirche and gave an interview at Zwinger Palace in Dresden.	President Barack Obama attends an expanded bilateral meeting with German Chancellor Angela Merkel at Dresden Castle, June 5, 2009.
France	Paris, Caen	June 5–7	President Obama visited France to commemorate the 65th anniversary of the Normandy Landings. Obama met dignitaries including French President Nicolas Sarkozy, British Prime Minister Gordon Brown, Canadian Prime Minister Stephen Harper, and Prince Charles, Prince of Wales. In Paris, President Obama and his family took part in sightseeing, including visiting the Centre Georges Pompidou and Notre Dame de Paris.	
Wisconsin	Green Bay	June 11	President Obama held a town-hall-style meeting, his first as president to promote health reform, at Green Bay Southwest High School.	P061109PS-0111 (3648443558)
Illinois	Chicago	June 15	President Obama made a speech to the American Medical Association at the Hyatt Regency Chicago, and pushed for reform in the American medical industry.	

== July ==
Country/ U.S. state	Areas visited	Dates	Details	Image
Virginia	Annandale	July 1	President Obama hosted a town hall meeting on health care reform at Northern Virginia Community College in Annandale, Virginia.	
Russia	Moscow	July 6–8	President Obama met with President Dmitry Medvedev to discuss global issues, including the War in Afghanistan. Obama delivered a speech to the New Economic School in Moscow.	
Italy	L'Aquila, Rome	July 8–10	President Obama was attending the 35th G8 summit. President Obama also met with President Giorgio Napolitano.	
Vatican City	Vatican City	July 10	President Obama met with Pope Benedict XVI, and discussed issues such as poverty, stem-cell research, peace in the Middle East, and the need to reach out to the Muslim world. Obama and the Pope also exchanged gifts.	
Ghana	Accra, Cape Coast	July 11	President Obama met with President John Atta Mills and made a speech to the Parliament of Ghana. He also toured a former departing point of the trans-Atlantic slave trade, the Cape Coast Castle.	
Missouri	St. Louis	July 14	President Obama threw out the ceremonial first pitch at the 2009 Major League Baseball All-Star Game.	Prince Fielder Ryan Howard Barack Obama
New Jersey	Holmdel	July 16	President Obama spoke at the PNC Bank Arts Center in support of Governor Jon Corzine's re-election campaign.	
New York	New York City	July 16	President Obama spoke to the NAACP in honor of the group's 100th anniversary.	
Ohio	Cleveland	July 23	President Obama traveled to Cleveland to participate in a town hall on health care.	P072309PS-0249 (3818180284)
North Carolina	Raleigh	July 29	President Obama traveled to Raleigh to participate in a town hall on health care.	President Barack Obama holds a town hall meeting at Broughton High School in Raleigh, N.C. on July 29, 2009

== August ==
Country/ U.S. state	Areas visited	Dates	Details	Image
Indiana	Wakarusa	August 5	President Obama gave remarks at the Monaco RV manufacturing facility in Wakarusa.	A person in the audience at Monaco RV manufacturing in Wakarusa, Ind. uses their cell phone to record President Barack Obama's remarks on the economy, August 5, 2009.
Virginia	Tysons Corner	August 6	President Obama spoke at a campaign rally for gubernatorial candidate Creigh Deeds.	President Barack Obama speaks at a campaign rally for gubernatorial candidate Creigh Deeds, left, in Tyson's Corner Va., on Aug. 6, 2009. Current Virginia Gov. Tim Kaine is at right in background.
Mexico	Guadalajara	August 9–10	President Obama attended the annual North American Leaders' Summit.	
New Hampshire	Portsmouth	August 11	President Obama led a town hall meeting on health care reform.	President Barack Obama speaks at Portsmouth High School in Portsmouth, N.H., at a town hall meeting about health care reform on Aug. 11, 2009
Montana	Belgrade	August 14	President Obama led a town hall meeting on health care reform.	President Barack Obama addresses a town hall meeting on health care insurance reform inside a hangar at Gallatin Field in Belgrade, Mont., on Aug. 14, 2009
Colorado	Grand Junction	August 15	President Obama led a town hall meeting on health care reform.	Barack Obama at Central High School, Grand Junction, Colorado
Arizona	Phoenix	August 17	President Obama addressed the annual Veterans of Foreign Wars convention.	P081709SA-0142 (3964715318)
Massachusetts	Martha's Vineyard	August 24-30	President Obama vacationed in Martha's Vineyard.	President Barack Obama puts a little body English on his shot during a round of golf at Farm Neck golf course during his vacation on Martha's Vineyard

== September ==
Country/ U.S. state	Areas visited	Dates	Details	Image
New York	New York City	September 9	President Obama attended to memorial services of journalist Walter Cronkite held at the Lincoln Center.	P090909PS-0277 (3994276528)
Virginia	Arlington County	September 11	President Obama attended a memorial ceremony at the Pentagon Memorial in Arlington County, Virginia, where he spoke on the eighth anniversary of the September 11 attacks.	P091109PS-0022 (3994265674)
Minnesota	Minneapolis – Saint Paul	September 12	President Obama addressed a rally for health care reform.	
Ohio	Warren	September 15	President Obama visited the General Motors Lordstown Assembly Plant.	P091509PS-0181 (3994314268)
Pennsylvania	Philadelphia	September 15	President Obama addressed a fundraiser for Senator Arlen Specter.	P091509PS-0936 (3993536313)
Maryland	College Park	September 17	President Obama gave remarks on health insurance reform to the University of Maryland.	P091709PS-0331 (3994558382)
New York	New York City, Troy	September 21-23	President Obama visited the Hudson Valley Community College, about a technology program and addressed the United Nations General Assembly.	Barack Obama addresses the United Nations General Assembly
Pennsylvania	Pittsburgh	September 24–25	President Obama hosted members of the G20 for the G-20 summit meeting.	
Maryland	Bethesda	September 30	President Obama visited an oncology laboratory at the National Institutes of Health.	P093009LJ-0036 (3993805075)

== October ==
Country/ U.S. state	Areas visited	Dates	Details	Image
Denmark	Copenhagen	October 2	President Obama was attending the 13th Olympic Congress, supporting the unsuccessful Chicago bid for the 2016 Summer Olympics. While in Denmark, President Obama met with Prime Minister Lars Løkke Rasmussen. He also met with Queen Margrethe II and Henrik, Prince Consort of Denmark.	P100209PS-0476 (4014483272)
Virginia	Springfield	October 14	President Obama visited highway construction project sites on the Fairfax County Parkway and discussed job creation programs.	President Barack Obama delivers remarks on the economic benefits of the Recovery Act after touring the Fairfax County Parkway Extension bridge construction site, a Recovery Act project, in Fairfax, Va., Oct. 14, 2009
Louisiana	New Orleans	October 15	President Obama traveled to New Orleans, Louisiana to survey reconstruction efforts in the aftermath of Hurricane Katrina, and held a town hall meeting at the University of New Orleans.	PresidentObamaMLKSchoolNOLAOct2009Handshakes
California	San Francisco	October 15	President Obama traveled to San Francisco, California. The President did not make any public appearances, although was present at a fundraiser for the Democratic National Committee.	Barack Obama speaks at the Westin St. Francis Hotel in San Francisco, 2009
Texas	College Station	October 16	President Obama gave a speech on public service at the Texas A&M University, alongside former President George H. W. Bush.	Barack Obama says goodbye to former President George H. W. Bush and former Secretary of State James A. Baker, 2009
Maryland	Silver Spring	October 19	President Obama traveled to Silver Spring, Maryland to visit the Viers Mills Elementary School, praising the school for mitigating the achievement gap between minorities and non-minority students.	Barack Obama talks with third and fourth grade students, 2009
New York	New York City	October 20	President Obama traveled to the headquarters of the Joint Terrorism Task Force in New York City.	A photo of President Barack Obama appears on a photographer's computer, 2009
New Jersey	Hackensack	October 21	President Obama traveled to Hackensack, New Jersey to support the unsuccessful re-election campaign of Governor Jon Corzine at Fairleigh Dickinson University.	Barack Obama stands with Senior Advisor Pete Rouse backstage at the Rothman Center, 2009
Massachusetts	Boston, Cambridge	October 23	President Obama visited the Massachusetts Institute of Technology, before attending a fundraiser for the re-election campaign of Governor Deval Patrick.	P102309PS-0491 (4050371499)
Florida	Miami, Jacksonville, Arcadia	October 26–27	President Obama spoke at a Democratic Party fundraiser in Miami at the Fontainebleau Hotel. He also spoke at the Naval Air Station Jacksonville, and toured the DeSoto Next Generation Solar Energy Center in Arcadia, describing the necessity of developing a national 'smart' power grid.	P102609PS-0454 (4074569531)
Delaware	Dover	October 29	President Obama traveled to Dover Air Force Base to oversee the return of eighteen American soldiers killed in Afghanistan.	Barack Obama and generals saluting U.S. personnel who died in Afghanistan

== November ==
Country/ U.S. state	Areas visited	Dates	Details	Image
New Jersey	Camden, Newark	November 1	President Obama was supporting the unsuccessful re-election campaign of Governor Jon Corzine. In Newark, he drew a crowd of approximately 11,000.	
Wisconsin	Madison	November 4	President Obama traveled to Wright Middle School in Madison, Wisconsin to discuss America's public education strategies with Secretary of Education Arne Duncan.	P110409PS-0420 (4186330701)
Texas	Killeen	November 10	President Obama traveled to Fort Hood outside Killeen, Texas, to speak at a memorial for the victims of the Fort Hood shooting.	
Virginia	Arlington County	November 11	President Obama traveled to the Arlington National Cemetery on Veterans Day, laying a wreath on the Tomb of the Unknowns.	Veteran's Day 2009 at the Tomb of the Unknown Soldier, Arlington National Cemetery on November 11, 2009 - 21
Alaska	Anchorage	November 12	President Obama made a brief trip to Elmendorf Air Force Base, speaking to military personnel there while en route to Tokyo.	P111209PS-0196 (4140462711)
Japan	Tokyo	November 13–14	The trip was the first stop on a four-nation tour of Asia. While in Japan, President Obama met with Prime Minister Yukio Hatoyama. Obama also visited the Tokyo Imperial Palace, meeting with Emperor Akihito and Empress Michiko, and made a speech at the Suntory Hall in Tokyo.	13usa1
Singapore	Singapore	November 14–15	The trip was the second stop on a four-nation tour of Asia. Obama was attending the APEC summit meeting. While in Singapore, Obama took part in bilateral meetings with Singaporean Prime Minister Lee Hsien Loong and Indonesian President Susilo Bambang Yudhoyono.	P111509PS-0211 (4140450861)
China	Shanghai, Beijing	November 15–18	The third stop on a four-nation tour of Asia. In Shanghai, President Obama met with Shanghai Party Secretary Yu Zhengsheng and Mayor Han Zheng. He also took part in a town-hall style meeting with Chinese students, addressing a range of issues such as internet censorship and U.S. arms deals with Taiwan. In Beijing, Obama took part in a bilateral meeting with President Hu Jintao, and met with Premier Wen Jiabao. Obama also met briefly with his half brother Mark Ndesandjo, and visited various cultural sights; these included the Forbidden City and part of the Great Wall of China.	Barack Obama on the Great Wall
South Korea	Seoul, Osan	November 18–19	The trip was the final stop on a four-nation tour of Asia. President Obama met with President Lee Myung-bak at the Blue House, discussing such issues as the inactive South Korea – United States Free Trade Agreement. Obama also met with American soldiers stationed at Osan Air Base.	US President Barack Obama visiting Korea in November 2009 (4347676321)

== December ==
Country/ U.S. state	Areas visited	Dates	Details	Image
New York	West Point	December 1	President Obama traveled to the United States Military Academy (West Point), where he presented his new battle strategy for the War in Afghanistan.	Barack Obama greeting cadets in West Point
Pennsylvania	Allentown	December 4	President Obama traveled to Allentown, Pennsylvania, where he held a town-hall gathering at Lehigh Carbon Community College discussing the proposed health care reform.	P120409PS-0905 (4190808349)
Norway	Oslo	December 10	President Obama was accepting the 2009 Nobel Peace Prize.	P121009SA-0879 (4177029407)
Denmark	Copenhagen	December 18	President Obama made a speech at the Bella Center to attendants of the United Nations Climate Change Conference. He also took part in a bilateral meeting with Chinese Premier Wen Jiabao, and met with Russian President Dmitry Medvedev to discuss completing a nuclear disarmament treaty to replace START I, a 15-year treaty that entered into force on December 5, 1994.	P121809PS-0272 (4197460651)

== See also ==
- List of international presidential trips made by Barack Obama
- Lists of presidential trips made by Barack Obama
