= Staatliche Kunsthalle Karlsruhe =

Art museum in Karlsruhe, Germany

Staatliche Kunsthalle
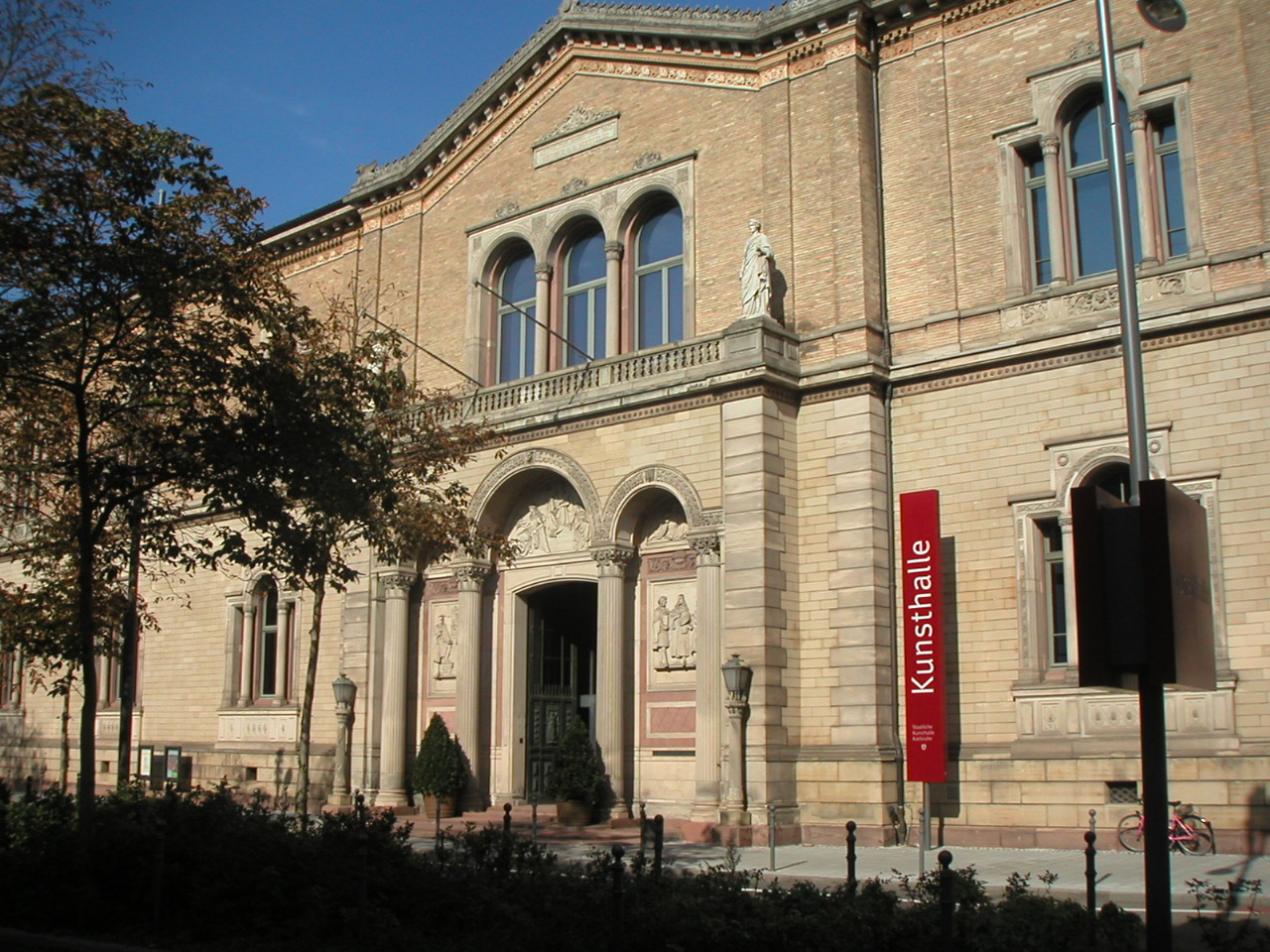
- The entrance in 2006
- Interactive fullscreen map
- Location: Karlsruhe, Germany
- Coordinates: 49°00′43″N 8°24′00″E
- Website: https://www.kunsthalle-karlsruhe.de/

The Staatliche Kunsthalle (State Art Gallery) is an fine art museum in Karlsruhe, Germany. Its collection consists of works by mainly German, French, Flemish and Dutch masters from the past eight centuries. The museum was conceived in the early 19th century by Heinrich Hübsch as a “Gesamtkunstwerk” combining architecture, painting and sculpture to house the collection of the Grand Duke of Baden.

The Kunsthalle Karlsruhe was one of the first museum buildings in Germany and is one of the very few to have largely retained its original design.

== History ==
Built by the grand ducal court architect Heinrich Hübsch between 1836 and 1846 as the Grand Ducal Picture Gallery and extended in several phases, it is one of the oldest museum buildings in Germany. It was created especially for the extensive art collection of the Baden royal family, the basis of which is the so-called Mahlerey-Cabinet of Markgravine Karoline Luise (1723–1783).

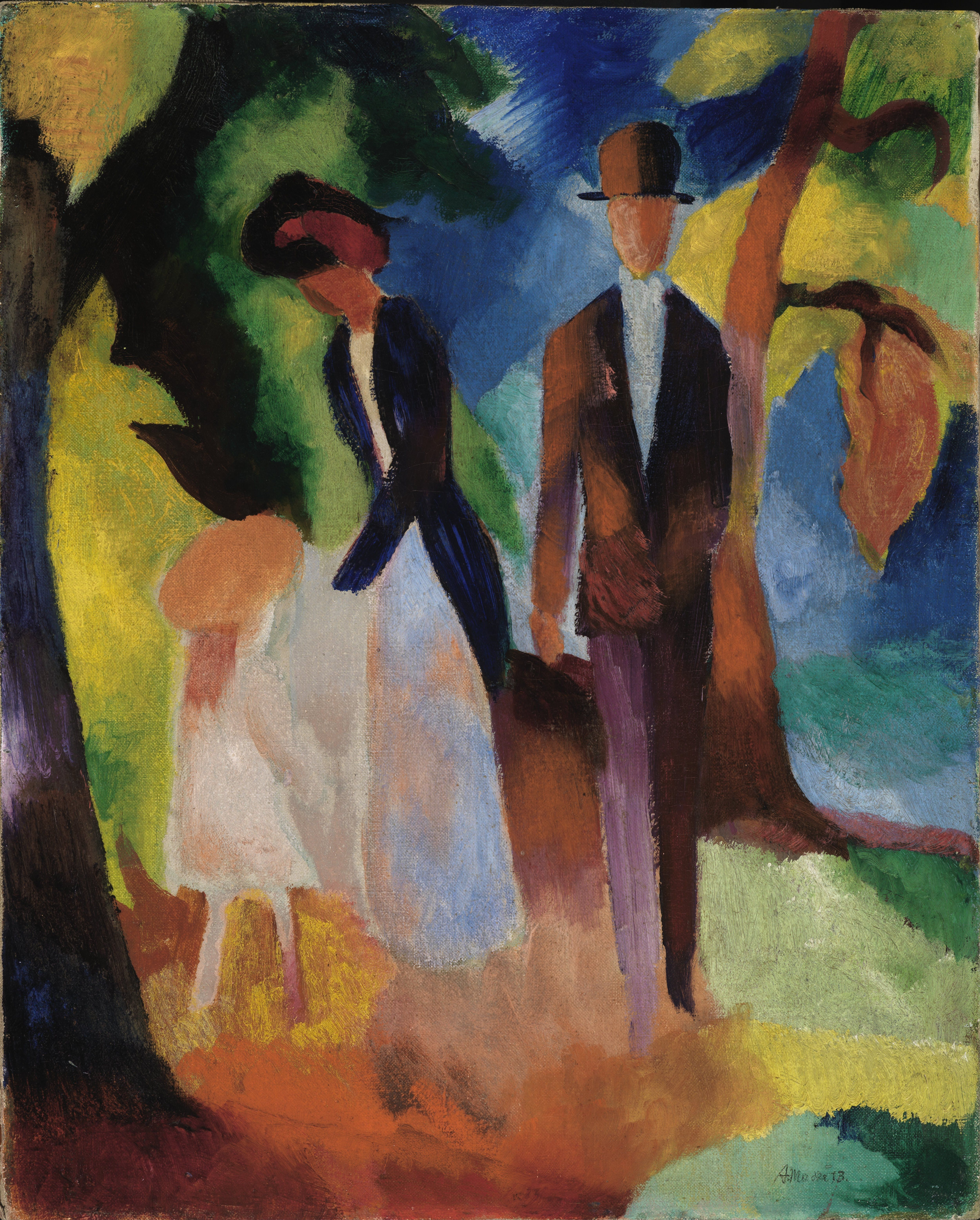
People on the Blue Lake, August Macke (1913)

The museum opened in 1846, in a neoclassical building next to the Karlsruhe Castle and the Karlsruhe Botanical Garden. It was expanded by Josef Durm and, most recently in 1990, by Heinz Moll.

There are two further museum buildings located in wider grounds of the Karlsruhe Castle. A villa for the director of the botanical garden, also designed by Heinrich Hübsch and built directly behind the museum. Since 2009 this has been home to the "Junge Kunsthalle" (Young Gallery), with exhibitions and art activities for children and young people. The children's museum of the Kunsthalle Karlsruhe was founded in 1973 and is one of the first of its kind in Germany. The Orangerie forms a part of the western wall of the botanical garden and is used for exhibitions showcasing the Kunsthalle's collection of contemporary art.

In November 2021 the buildings closed for extensive renovation. Since April 2023 there has been a series of highlights and studio exhibitions from the collection presented in ZKM Karlsruhe. The Junge Kunsthalle has re-opened for exhibitions and its programme of art activities.

== Collections ==
Markgravine Karoline Luise collected over 205 works, mostly French, Flemish and Dutch paintings between 1759 and 1776. The collection expanded in 1858 with addition of 15th and 16th century religious works from the collection of theologian Johann Baptist von Hirscher and through acquisitions made by former director Hans Thoma, notably the Tauberbischofsheim Altarpiece by Matthias Grünewald. The collection has developed over the years in the direction of Impressionism, Expressionism and contemporary art.

=== Old Master Painters ===
The Master of the Karlsruhe Passion, Albrecht Dürer, Hans Baldung, Lucas Cranach the Elder, Hans Burgkmair, Rembrandt, Pieter de Hooch, Peter Paul Rubens, David Teniers the Younger, Hyacinthe Rigaud, Claude Lorrain, Nicolas Poussin, Jean-Baptiste-Siméon Chardin.

=== 19th Century to the present ===
Eugène Delacroix, Gustave Courbet, Édouard Manet, Camille Pissarro, Claude Monet, Edgar Degas, Auguste Renoir, Paul Cézanne, Paul Gauguin, Caspar David Friedrich, Hans Thoma, Lovis Corinth, August Macke, Ernst Ludwig Kirchner, Erich Heckel, Franz Marc, Jean-Marc Nattier, Max Pechstein, Max Ernst, Kurt Schwitters, Juan Gris, Yves Tanguy, Robert Delaunay, Otto Dix, and Fritz von Uhde.

=== Kupferstichkabinett (Prints & Drawings) ===
Some of the oldest works in the museum's collection are the prints & drawings collected by Frederick V, Margrave of Baden-Durlach, featuring works from the beginnings of the printing press era in the 14th century. In the 19th-century Grand Duke Leopold and Grand Duke Frederick expanded the collection to include works on paper and sketchbooks, many of whom studied in the newly established State Academy of Fine Arts Karlsruhe. After World War II, the collection was enhanced by works from artists in Die Brücke and the New Objectivity movement, while strengthening its holdings of French drawings. The collection continues to grow with contemporary German artists and now includes photography.

=== Kunstbibliothek (Art Reference Library) ===
The art reference library is one of the larger museum libraries open to the public in Germany. Its collection strengths are exhibition catalogues, museum and private collection catalogues, and artists' catalogues raisonne. Special focal points are art education and auction catalogues. The magazines collection features yearbooks and museum annual reports, as well as fine art journals from around the world. There is an illustrated books collection housed in the Kupferstichkabinett.

== Gallery ==
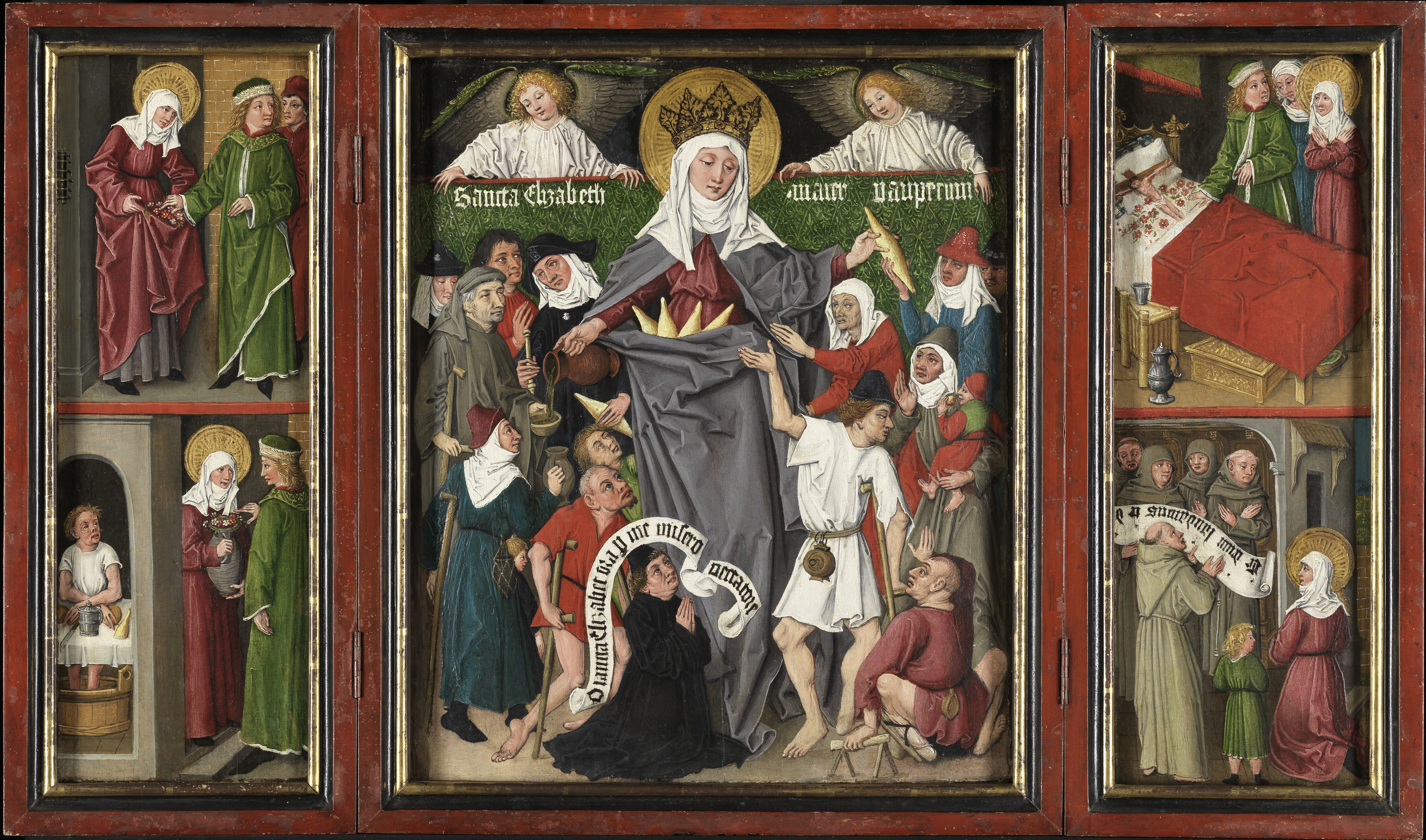
Elizabeth Triptych, c. 1480-90, Master of the Drapery Studies

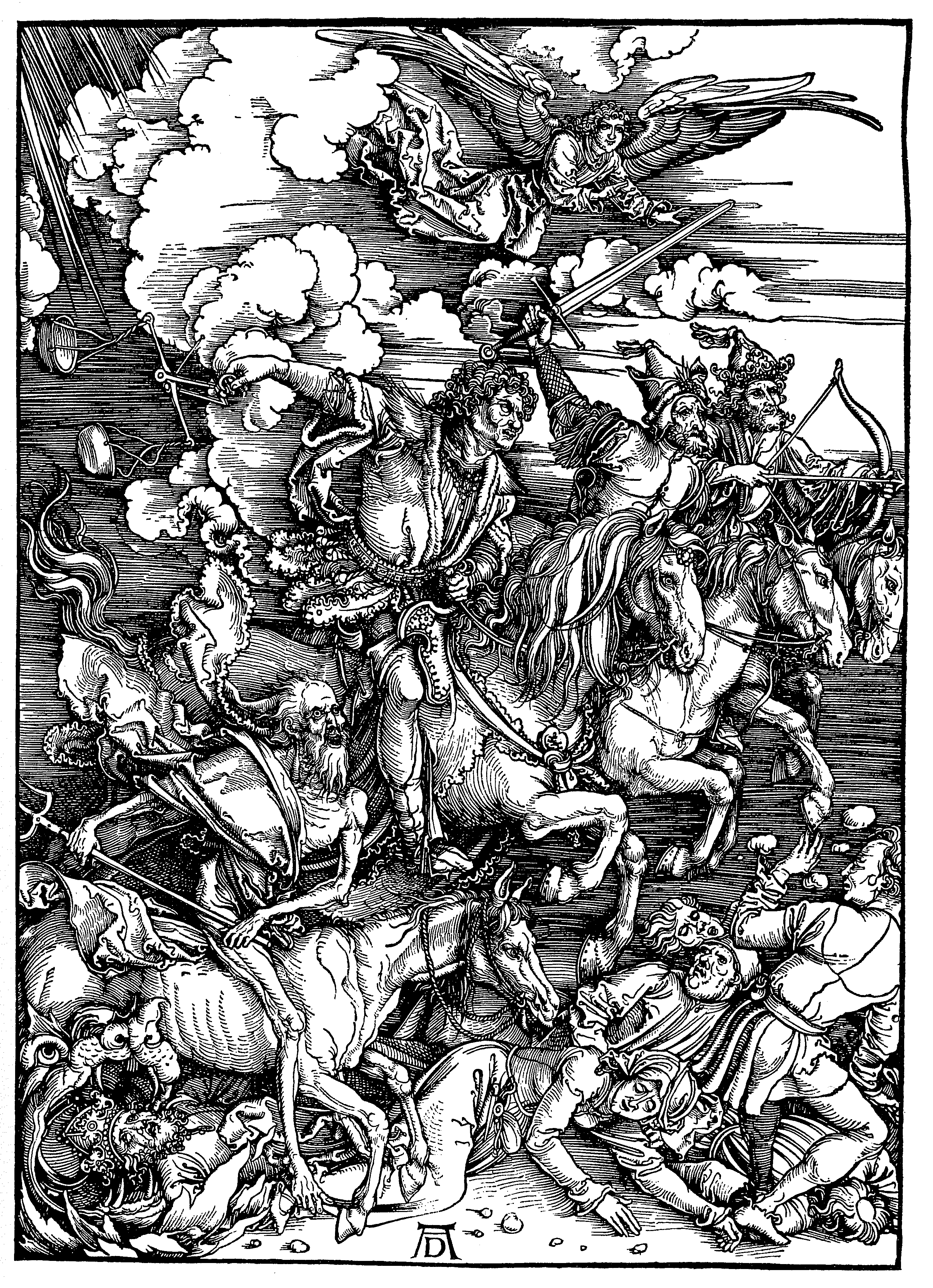
The Four Riders of the Apocalypse, Albrecht Dürer (1497–1498)

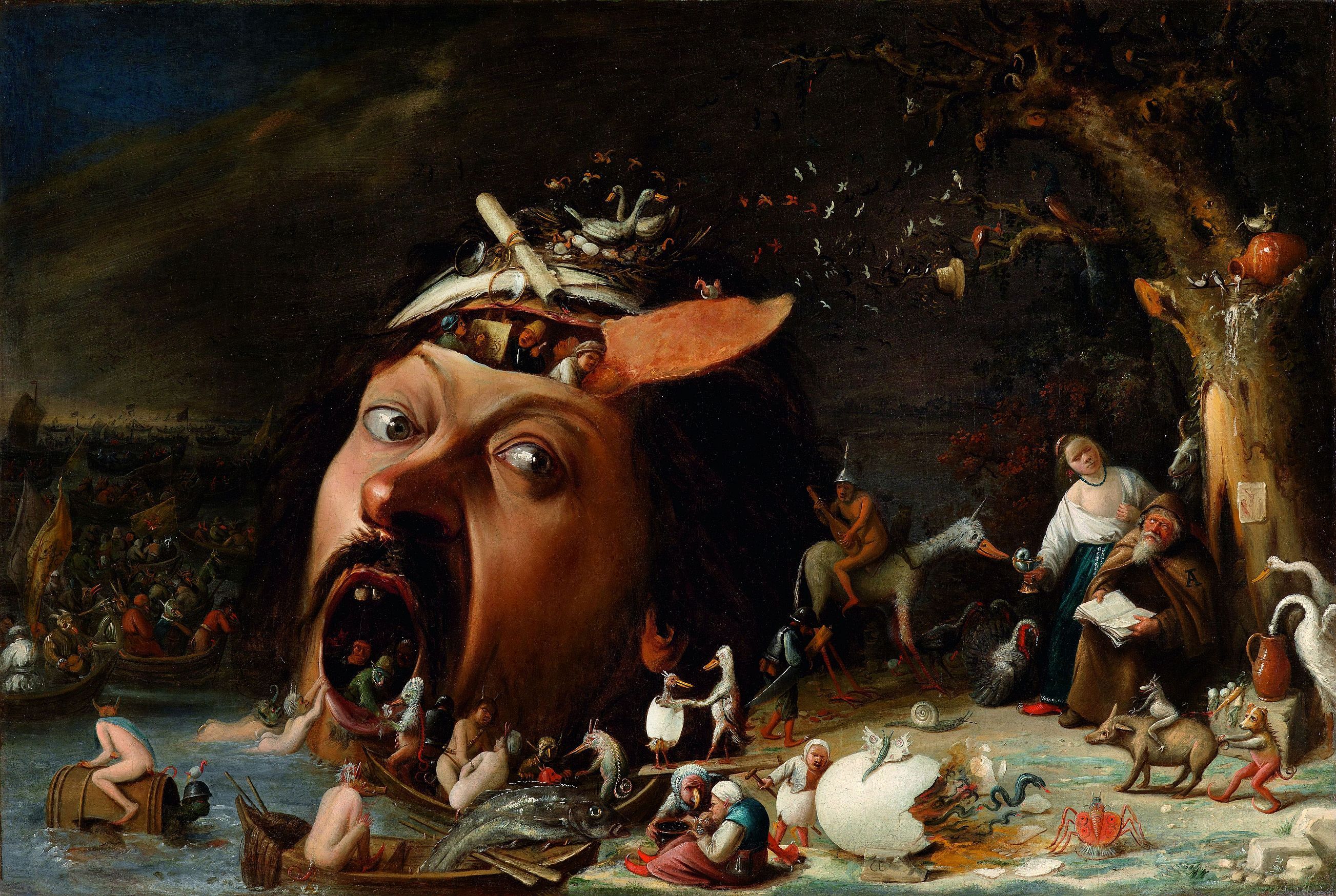
The Temptation of St Anthony, Joos van Craesbeeck (c. 1650)

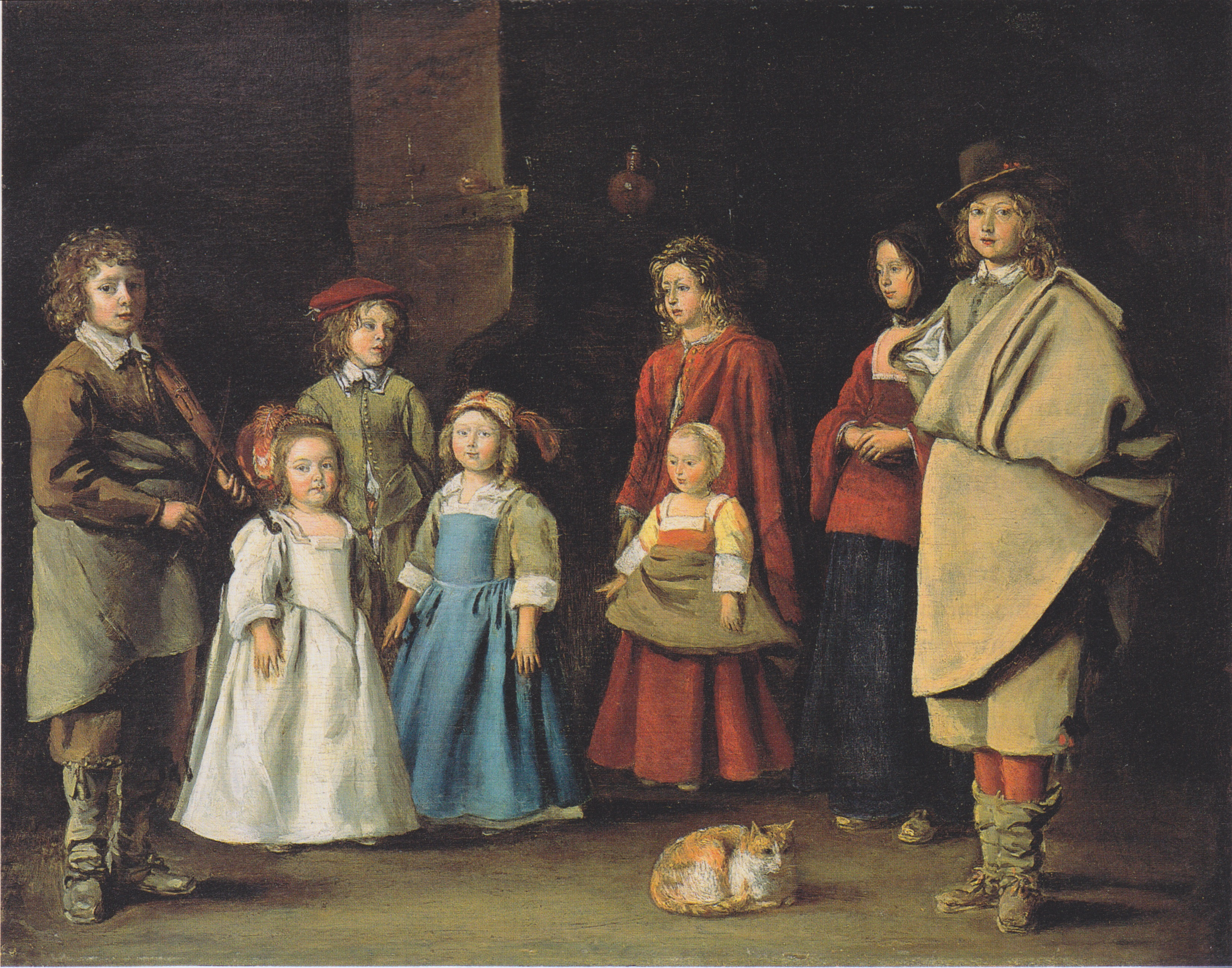
Preparing for Dancing School, Antoine Le Nain (after 1650)

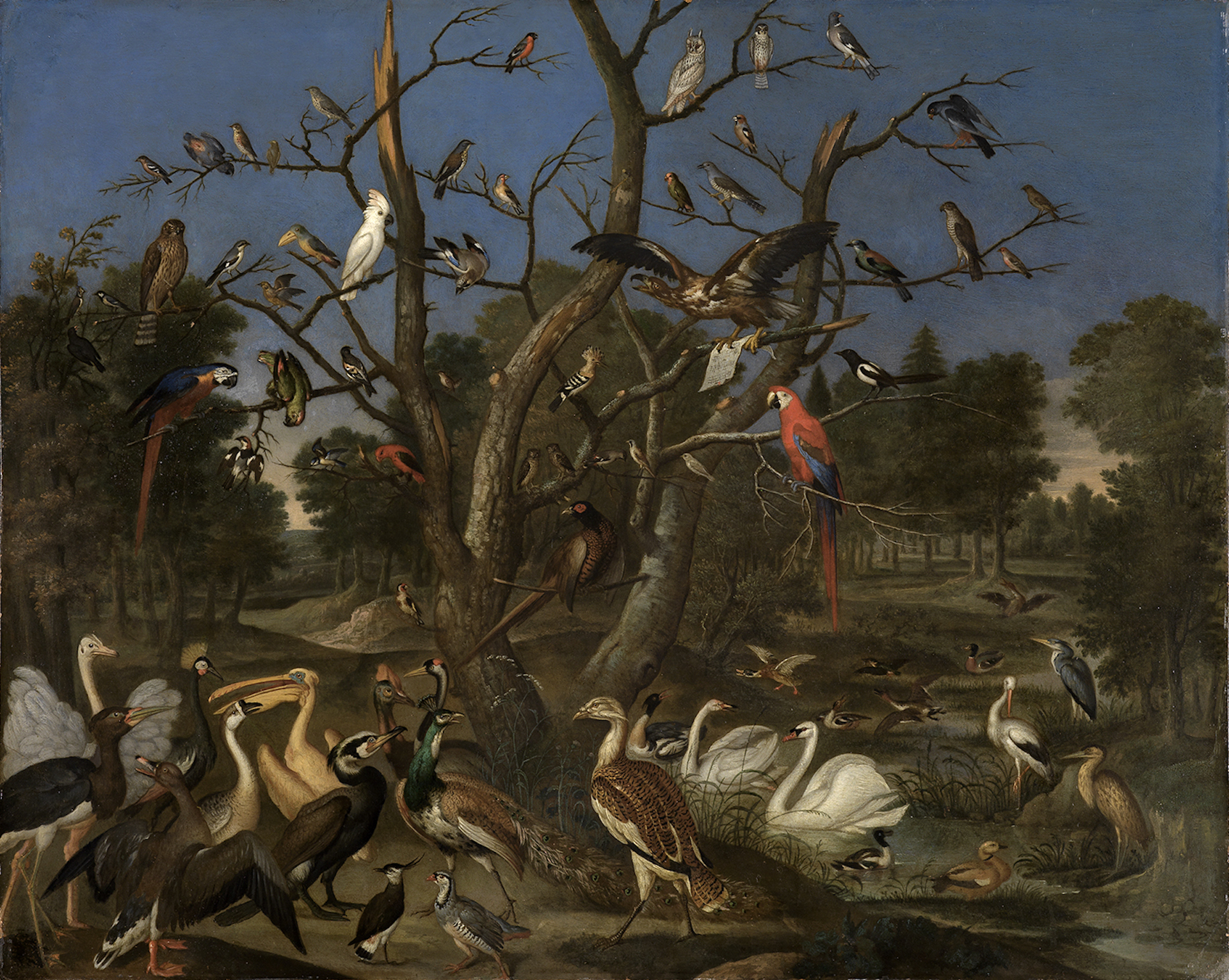
A Concert of Birds, Franz de Hamilton Karlsruhe (17th century)

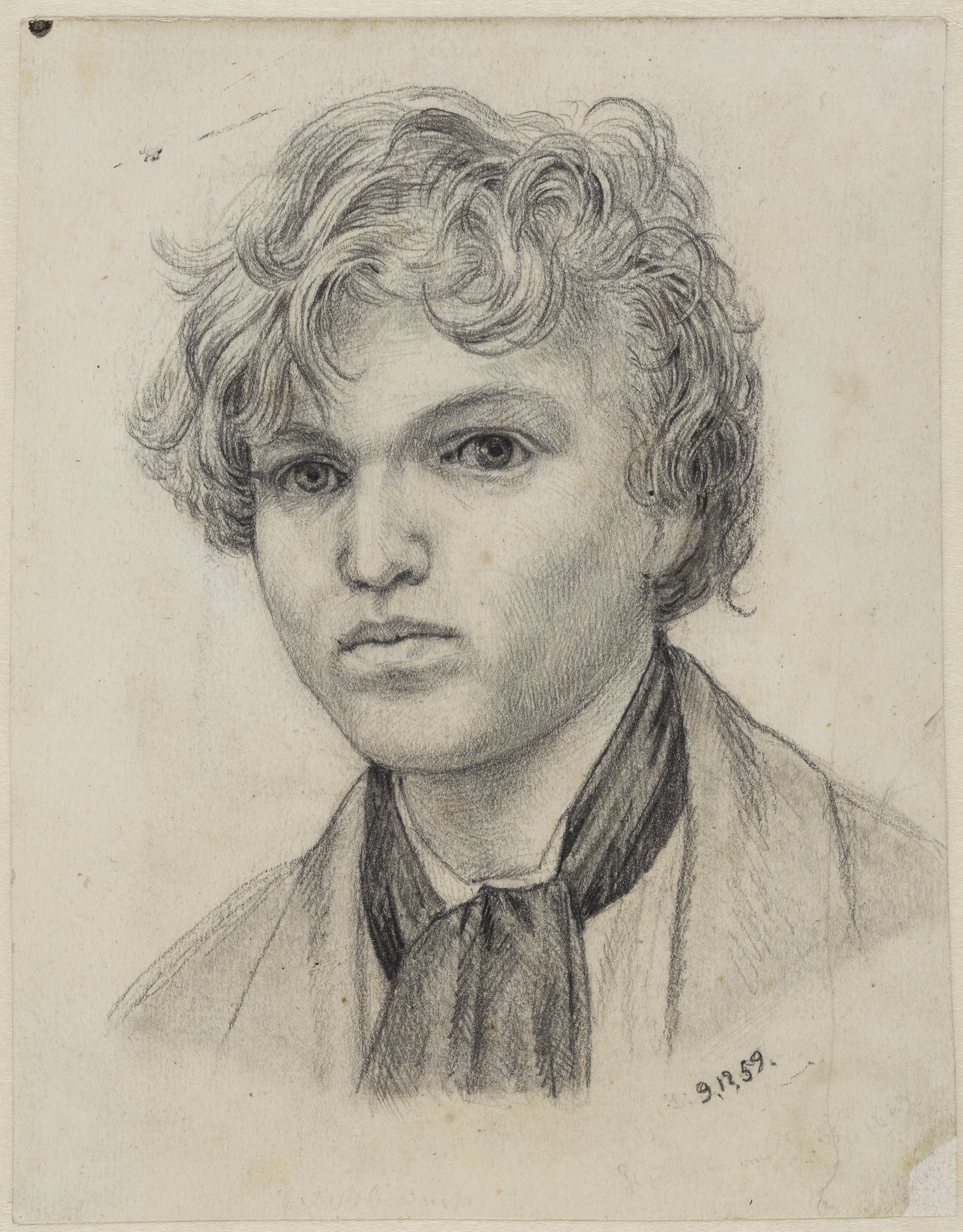
Self-portrait, Hans Thoma (1859)

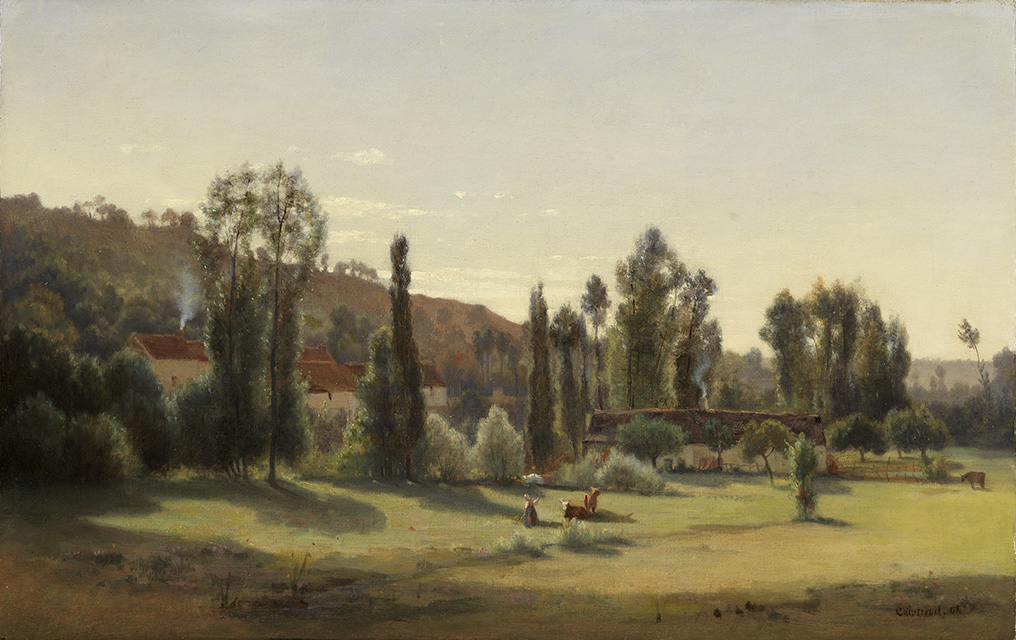
Landscape near Marcoussis, Antoine Chintreuil (1864)

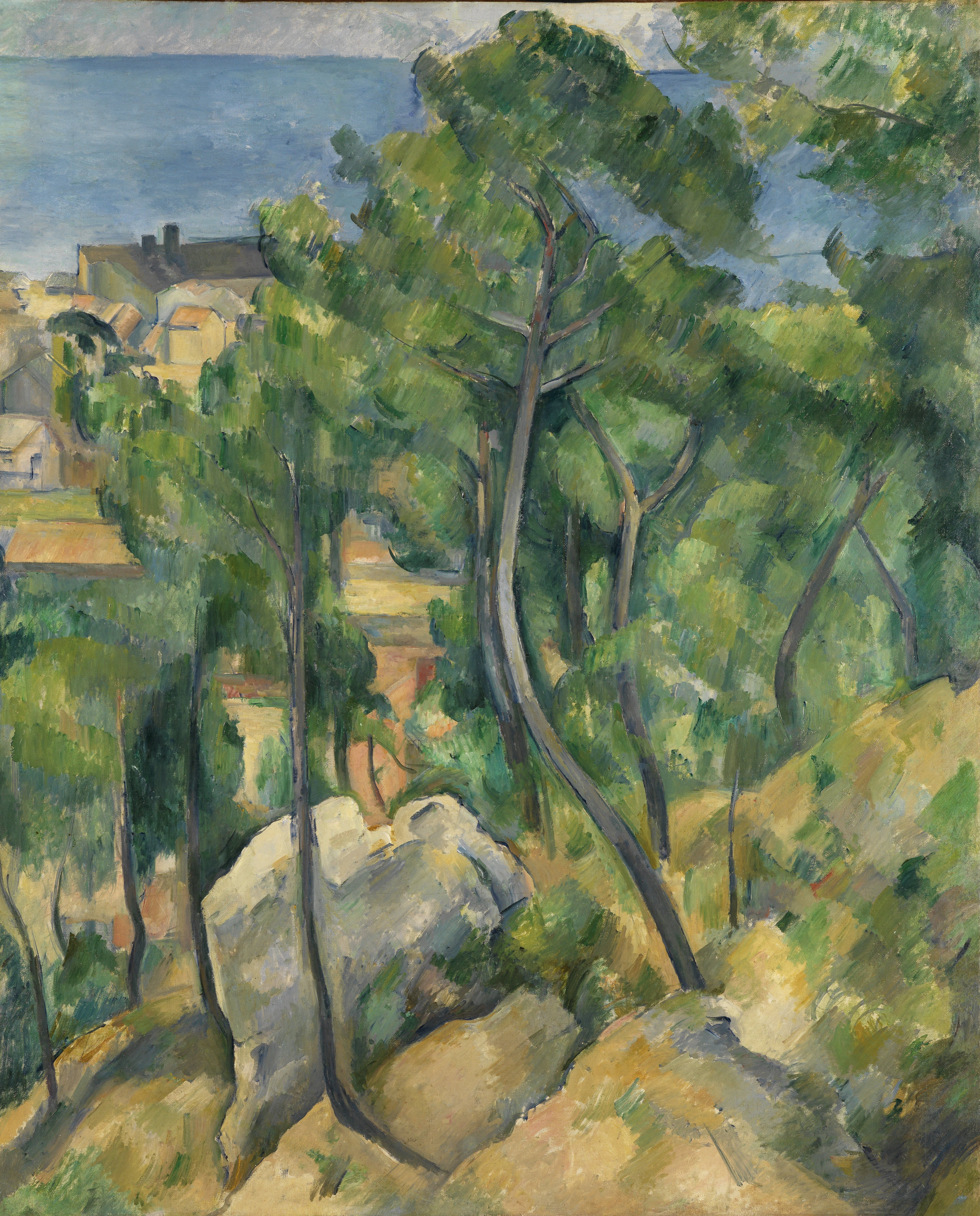
Rochers, pins et mer à l'Estaque, Paul Cézanne (1883–1885)

== See also ==
- List of art museums
- List of museums in Germany
