= Badisches Staatstheater Karlsruhe =

Theatre and opera house in Germany

Coordinates: 49°00′14″N 8°24′22″E

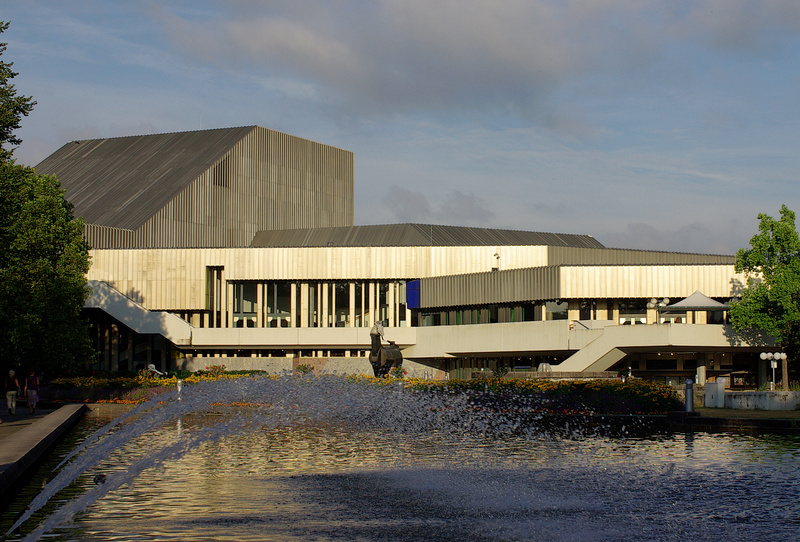
Badisches Staatstheater Karlsruhe

The Badisches Staatstheater Karlsruhe is a theatre and opera house in Karlsruhe, Germany. It has existed in its present form and place at Ettlinger Tor since 1975. Achim Thorwald became the Intendant in summer 2002 and held that post until the end of the 2010/11 season. Peter Spuhler succeeded him at the beginning of the 2011/12 season and continues to serve in that post.

The Staatstheater is a Dreisparten venue, housing three performance genres: musical theatre, ballet and theatre, as well as the studio stage in Karlstraße. The Badische Staatskapelle (orchestra) and the Badische Staatsopernchor (opera chorus) are resident companies of the theatre.

== History ==
City architect Friedrich Weinbrenner constructed the first predecessor of the Badisches Staatstheater in 1808 near the castle. In 1810, it became the Großherzogliches Hoftheater (Grand Ducal court theatre).

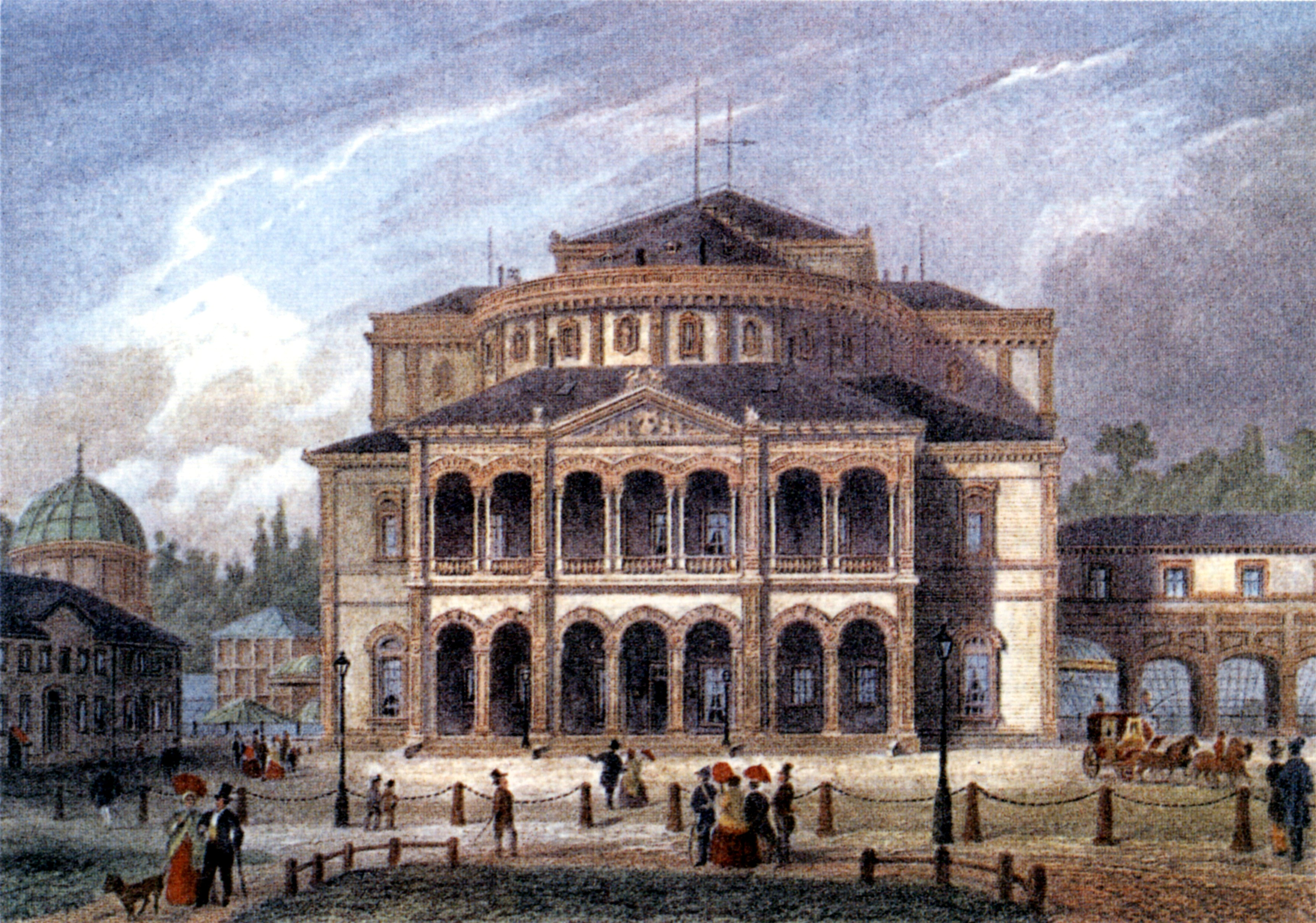
Hoftheater by Heinrich Hübsch, 1853 to 1944

During a performance on 28 February 1847, a fire broke out destroying the building which had been built mainly from wood and canvas. A total of 63 spectators perished, most in a panic caused by doors that opened inwards and prevented a speedy escape. The replacement theatre, by court architect Heinrich Hübsch, was finished in 1853 and opened under the direction of Eduard Devrient.

During an Anglo-US-American aerial bombardment on 27 September 1944, the Hoftheater was destroyed again. The site is now occupied by the German Federal Constitutional Court. Plans for the current facility were finalized in 1964 and the venue opened in 1975.

Between 1978 and 1984, works of baroque composer Georg Friedrich Händel were presented in a special format annually known as Händel Days. In 1985, on the occasion of the composer's tricentenary, these became the Händel Festival, which occurs yearly on 23 February, Händel's birthday.
