= Carl Heinrich Hermann =

German painter

Carl Heinrich Hermann (6 January 1802, Dresden – 30 April 1880, Berlin) was a German fresco-painter.

== Life ==
He studied at the Dresden Academy and the Kunstakademie Düsseldorf under Peter von Cornelius. With Jakob Götzenberger and Ernst Förster he painted the frescoes in the hall of Bonn University - that of Theology is by Hermann. He later accompanied Cornelius to Munich, where he was involved in producing frescoes for the Glyptothek and the Ludwigskirche.

Among his own compositions are the frescoes for Wolfram's "Parzival" in the Königsbau of Munich Residenz, the ceiling painting in the Protestant church showing the Ascension of Christ and a painting in the Hofgarten arcades showing emperor Ludwig of Bavaria's victory at Ampfing. In 1841 he was summoned to Berlin to complete Karl Friedrich Schinkel's designs for the entrance hall of the Altes Museum - he completed them in 1847.

In the Franziskaner-Klosterkirche in Berlin, he painted 14 frescoes of the patriarchs, prophets, evangelists and the apostles Peter and Paul. He later drew 15 large compositions showing the main moments in German history through the architectural forms prevalent in that era - these were reproduced in engravings.

== Illustrations ==
- In: Reinick, Robert. Lieder eines Malers mit Randzeichnungen seiner Freunde. - Düsseldorf: Schulgen-Bettendorff, 1836, Probedruck. Digitalised version at the Universitäts- und Landesbibliothek Düsseldorf

== Bibliography ==
- https://de.wikisource.org/wiki/ADB:Hermann,_Karl_Heinrich
