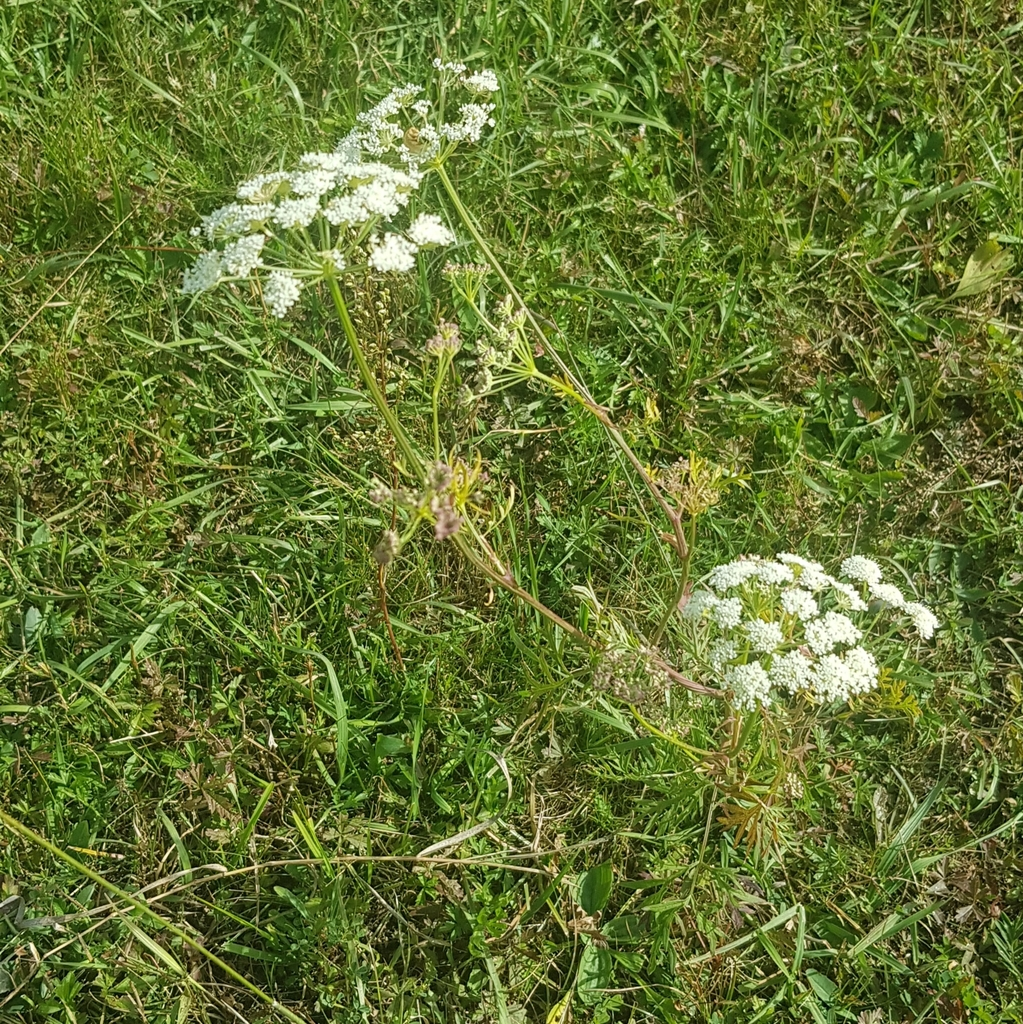

Scientific classification
- Kingdom: Plantae
- Clade: Tracheophytes
- Clade: Angiosperms
- Clade: Eudicots
- Clade: Asterids
- Order: Apiales
- Family: Apiaceae
- Subfamily: Apioideae
- Tribe: Selineae
- Genus: Kadenia; Lavrova & V.N.Tikhom.

= Kadenia =

Genus of flowering plants

Kadenia is a genus of flowering plants belonging to the family Apiaceae.

Its native range is Europe to Siberia and Northern China.

Species:

- Kadenia dubia (Schkuhr) Lavrova & V.N.Tikhom.
- Kadenia salina (Turcz.) Lavrova & V.N.Tikhom.
