= Jakob Götzenberger =

German painter

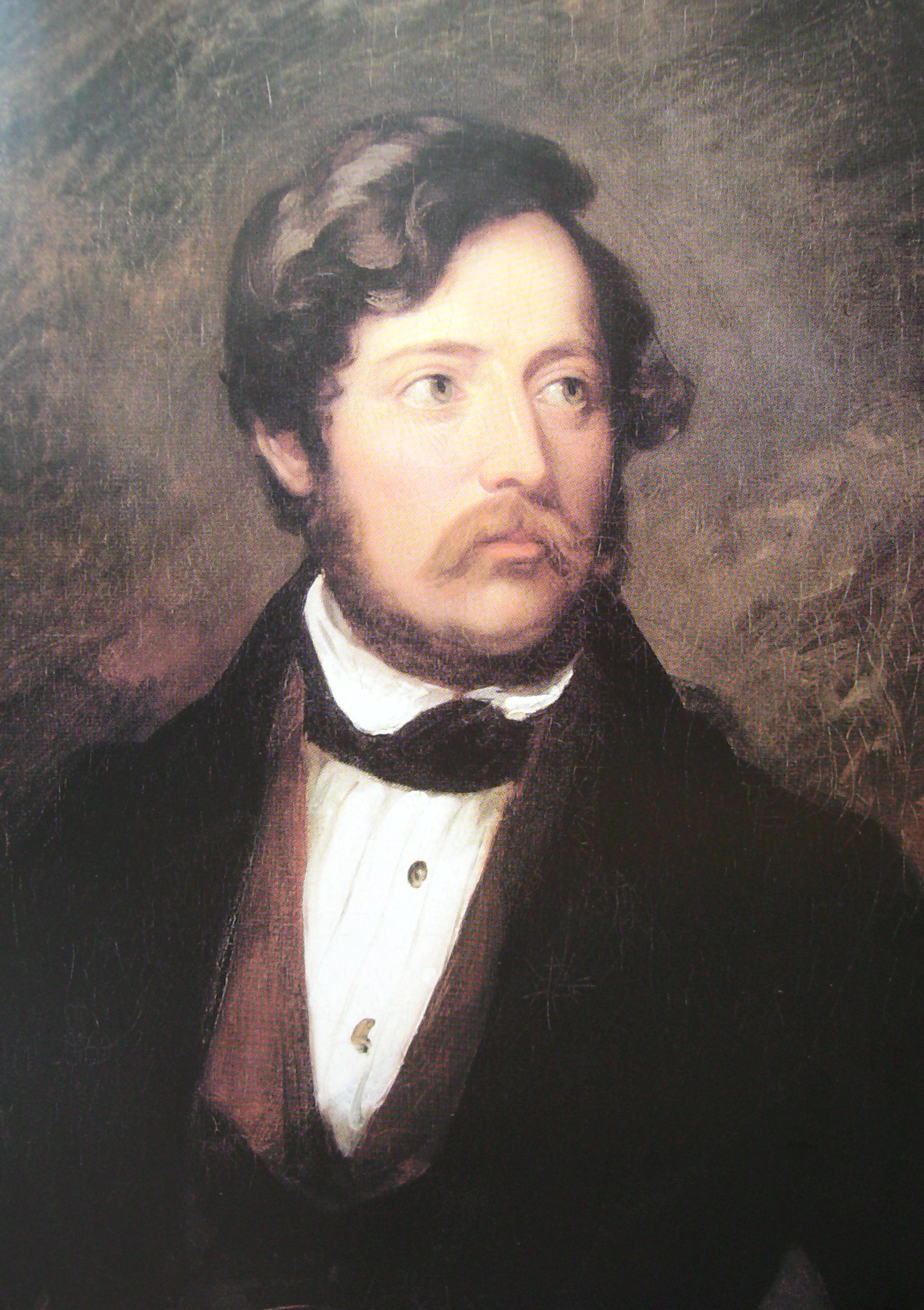
Jakob Götzenberger; portrait by Louis Krevel (1834)

Jakob Götzenberger (Franz Jakob Julius Götzenberger, Heidelberg 4 November 1802 – Darmstadt 6 October 1866) was a German mural painter and portraitist, a pupil of Peter Cornelius. He spent much of the later part of his career in England.

== Biography ==
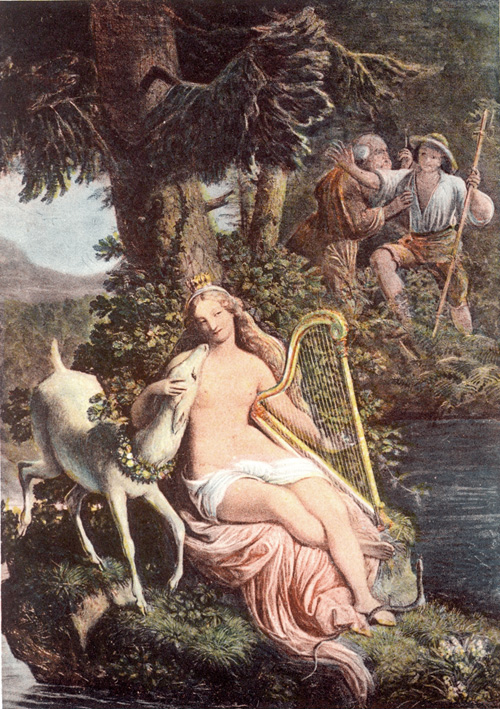
Water nymph of the Wildsee, fresco in the Trinkhall at Baden-Baden

Götzenberger was born in Heidelberg. He studied art in Düsseldorf, where he became a pupil of Peter Cornelius, a member of the Nazarene Brotherhood which, largely inspired by the artists of the early Italian Renaissance, had promoted the revival of fresco-painting in Germany.

It was through Cornelius that Götzenberger came to carry out the greater part of a major commission for a set of four frescoes at the "Aula" (auditorium) of the University of Bonn. The compositions, each representing one of the four faculties of the university, were, on Cornelius' instructions, based on those of Raphael's paintings in the Stanze in the Vatican. Work began in 1823; initially Götzenberger acted only as an assistant, Cornelius having delegated the main work to Carl Heinrich Hermann. However, in early 1825, with only the first of the four murals, representing Theology, substantially underway, Cornelius left to take up a teaching post in Munich; most of his pupils, including Hermann, went with him, and Götzenberger was left with the task of completing the work in Bonn. He spent some time in Italy, where he made the designs for the remaining subjects, before finally completing the murals in 1836. They had fallen into disrepair by the early 20th century, and were destroyed by bombing during the Second World War.

Götzenberger was in London in early 1827, and on 2 February was introduced to William Blake by Henry Crabb Robinson. He later said "I saw in England many men of talents, but only three men of Genius, Coleridge, Flaxman and Blake, and of these Blake was the greatest."

A major commission came from Ursula von Herding, for whom he painted a cycle of frescoes of the life of Christ in the chapel at the Dalberg-Herdingschen Castle in Nierstein, Hesse, newly built for her in 1839–42. He was appointed court painter and inspector of the gallery at Mannheim, and in 1844 decorated the loggia of the Trinkhalle (pump room) at Baden-Baden with 14 compositions illustrating legends of the Black Forest region.

=== England ===
In 1847 he moved to England, where he painted portraits, interiors, and a few decorative schemes, including one for Lord Ellesmere, at Bridgewater House, London, where he not only executed the paintings, but also designed the stucco architectural settings. The result provoked the displeasure of the house's architect, Charles Barry. He is also recorded as having painted a series of works on subjects from Dante's Divine Comedy for a Mr Morrison and later carried out a commission for set of four panels illustrating "The Ballad of Chevy Chase" for the guard room at Alnwick Castle.

His depictions of interiors were praised in The Spectator for their "truthful and pleasant light and shade, figures introduced with natural appropriateness, and portrait-like truth of rendering." There is a conversation piece by Götzenberger in the collection of Jesus College, Oxford.

He lived at 46 Berners Street in London. Some English sources of the time refer to him as "Francis Gotzenberg", and he became a naturalised British subject under this name in 1859.

=== Last years ===
Götzenberger spent the years 1863–5 in Lucerne, and died at Darmstadt on 6 October 1866.

== See also ==
- List of German painters
