= Trinkhalle (Baden-Baden) =

Spa building in Baden-Baden, Germany

Coordinates: 48°45′42″N 8°14′12″E

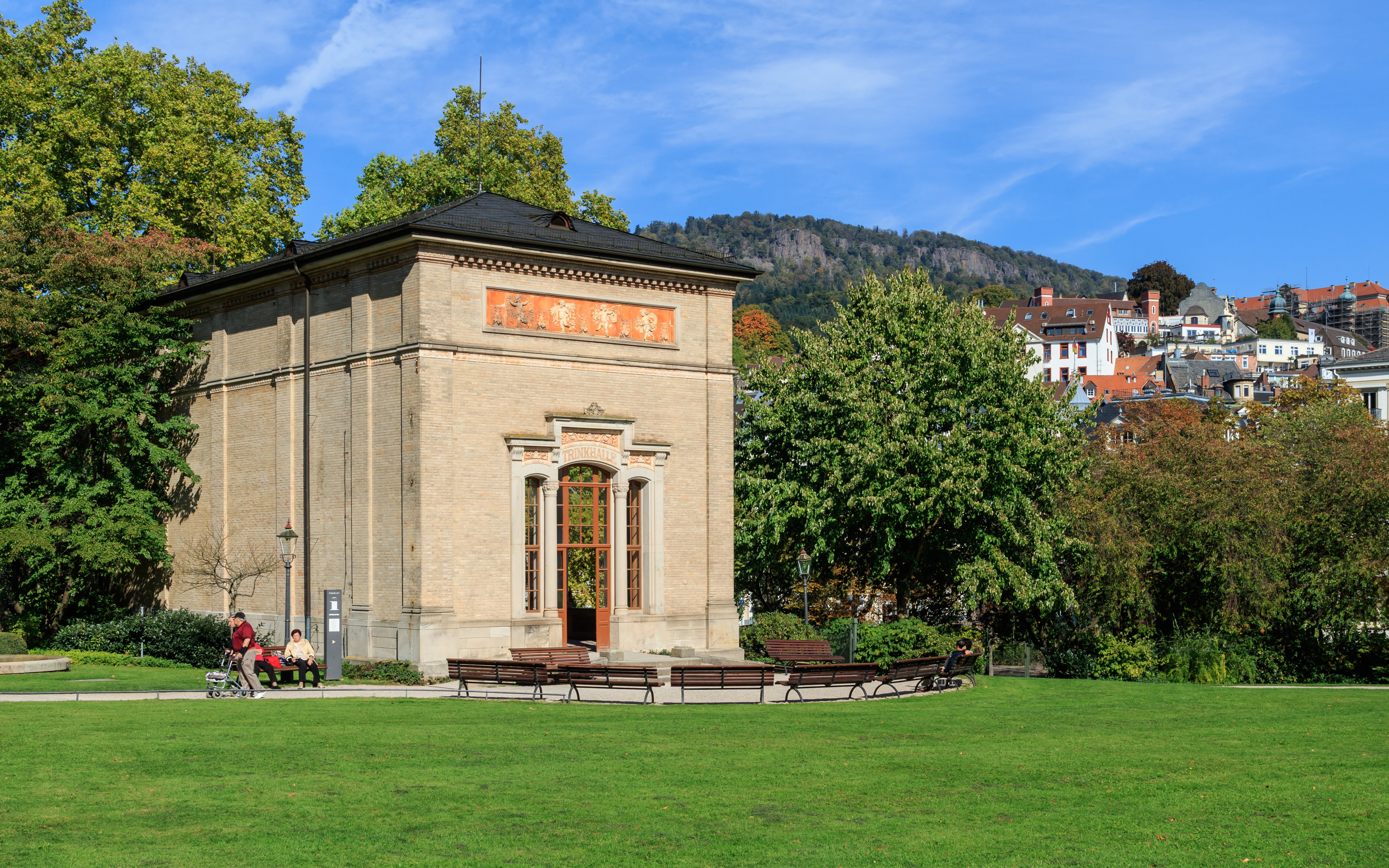
Trinkhalle's side entrance

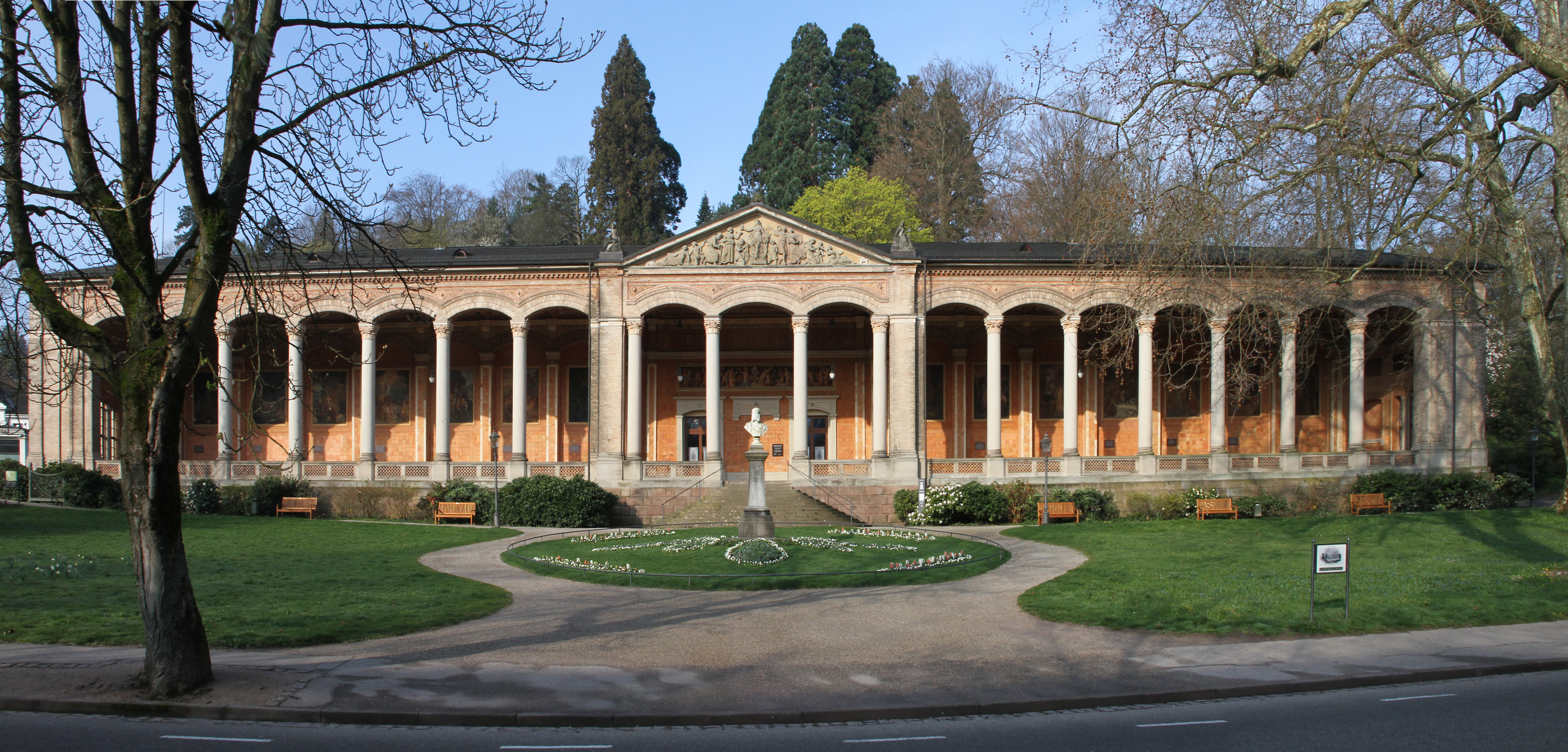
Trinkhalle's open colonnade.

The Trinkhalle (pump house) in the Kurhaus spa complex in Baden-Baden, Germany was built 1839–42 by Heinrich Hübsch in a complementary architectural style as the spa's main building. The 90-metre arcade is lined with frescos and benches. The spa waters are said to have curative powers.

== Motifs of the frescos ==
The frescoes by Jakob Götzenberger are listed in the order from left (south) to right (north). Image title and text come from the board that is attached under the respective image.

Burkart Keller von Yburg	=== Burkart Keller von Yburg === On the way to his fiancée in Kuppenheim, Junker Burkart Keller succumbs to the lure of a veiled woman at the pagan sacrificial stone at night. She kisses him and sucks the soul out of his body. The place is still called "Kellersbild" today; a stone cross bears Burkart Keller's name.
Der Mummelsee	=== Der Mummelsee === On moonlit summer nights, the mermaids rise from the grounds of the Lake and dance their rounds. In the first hour after midnight, the Sea King lifts his head out of the water and brings his daughters back.
Die Nixe des Wildsees	=== Die Nixe des Wildsees === With flattering music and beguiling singing, the Mermaid Merline invites a young shepherd to the shore of the Wildsee. Despite the warning of an old tar cooker, he succumbs to temptation and sinks into the depth of the lake.
Engels- und Teufelskanzel	=== Engels- und Teufelskanzel === The devil and an angel preached on two rocks near the Wolfsschlucht. But the people only listened to the message of salvation. Satan angrily stamped on the rock, where the imprint of the horse's foot can still be seen today.
Der Grafensprung	=== Der Grafensprung === Tracked down by his pursuers on Neu-Eberstein, Ritter Wolf von Eberstein has to flee. The only way out for him is the bold jump from the rock into the valley of the Murg. The knight remains unharmed. Since then, the rock above the Murg has been called "Grafensprung".
Alt-Eberstein	=== Alt-Eberstein === Emperor Otto I besieged castle Alt-Eberstein for three and a half years without success. Now he uses a ruse to invite the opponents to a tournament in Speyer. But the Emperor's daughter Edeltraut reveals the plan to Count Eberhard and thus prevents the castle from falling.
Fremersberg	=== Fremersberg === Margrave Jakob I got lost during a thunderstorm while hunting at Fremersberg Monastery. Two hermits take care of him and give him food and drink. As a thank you, the margrave donates the franciscan Fremersberg Monastery.
Die Geisterhochzeit zu Lauf	=== Die Geisterhochzeit zu Lauf === A young knight is looking for a place to sleep at Neu-Windeck Castle and meets a mysterious woman there. After a feast, he asks her to become his wife. At the wedding ceremony in the castle chapel, a rooster suddenly crows and the whole spook disappears.
Baldreit	=== Baldreit === Earlier than expected, Count Palatine Otto Heinrich was freed from his suffering by the healing Baden-Baden springs. In the courtyard of an inn he happily mounts his horse and calls out to the landlord: "Look, I'll be riding so soon!" This is how the Baldreit inn (means "riding soon inn") got its peculiar name.
Die Felsen	=== Die Felsen === On the hunt for the white deer, the wild hunter meets the rock maiden, who takes the strange animal under protection. He succumbs to her magic and becomes a hermit, whom the animals of the forest now approach confidently.
Burg Windeck	=== Burg Windeck === The knights at Windeck castle hold the cathedral dean of Strasbourg prisoner. An old woman helps the dean's niece and nephew to free him with a wonderful white hen. The hen prevents the people of Strasbourg from conquering the castle.
Allerheiligen	=== Allerheiligen === A young woman mourns the loss of her lover, who fell into an waterfall near the monastery of All Saints when he tried to take back the stolen engagement ring from a raven.
Schloss Hohenbaden	=== Schloss Hohenbaden === On the tower of Hohenbaden Castle Margravine Katharina of Austria asked the Mother of God to end the Plague. As the hot springs passed through the streets of the city, the steam smothered the plague. The margravine gratefully consecrates her two children to the clergy.
Kloster Lichtental	=== Kloster Lichtenthal === In the Thirty Years War (1618–1648) the Abbess places the keys of the Lichtenthal Monastery in the hands of the Mother of God and asks protection from the Swedish troops, who, blinded by the gleaming statue, shrink back. The monastery was saved.
