= Kurhaus of Baden-Baden =

German spa resort and casino

Coordinates: 48°45′37″N 8°14′11″E

Kurhaus Baden-Baden
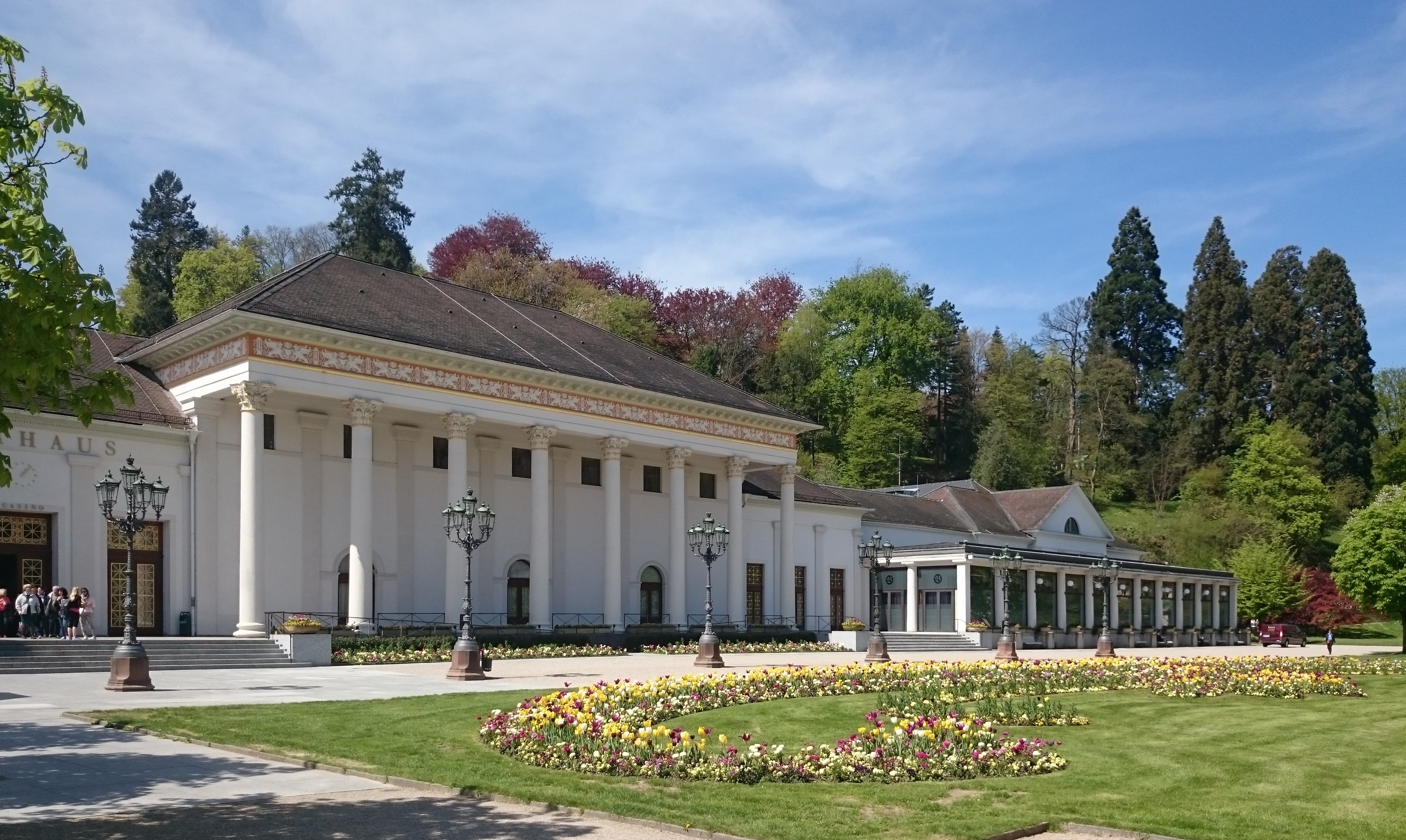

General information
- Architectural style: Neoclassical
- Location: Baden-Baden, Germany
- Year built: 1824

Design and construction
- Architect: Friedrich Weinbrenner

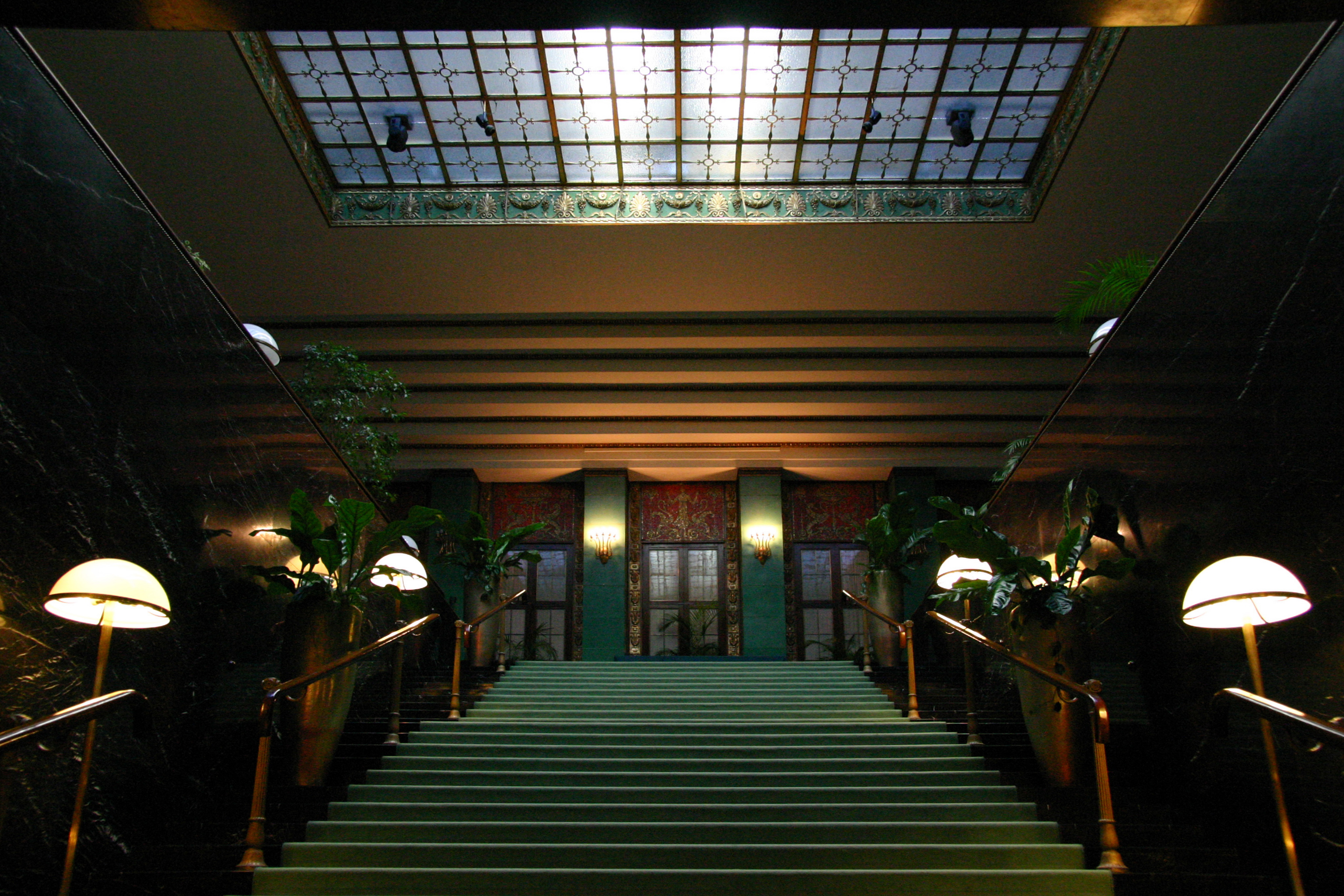
The principal staircase

The Kurhaus is a spa resort, casino, and conference complex in Baden-Baden, Germany in the outskirts of the Black Forest.

== History ==
The main structure was designed in 1824 by Friedrich Weinbrenner, who is responsible for the Corinthian columns and paired-griffins frieze of the grand entrance and the neo-classical interiors. Although a casino was incorporated from the inception of the Kurhaus, it only began to achieve international fame in the mid-1830s, when gambling was forbidden in France. This legal barrier encouraged gamblers to cross the border where they could try their luck at Baden-Baden's gaming tables. Fyodor Dostoyevsky's The Gambler was inspired by the Russian author's visit to the Kurhaus casino. At one point in her life, Marlene Dietrich declared that this was "the most beautiful casino in the world."

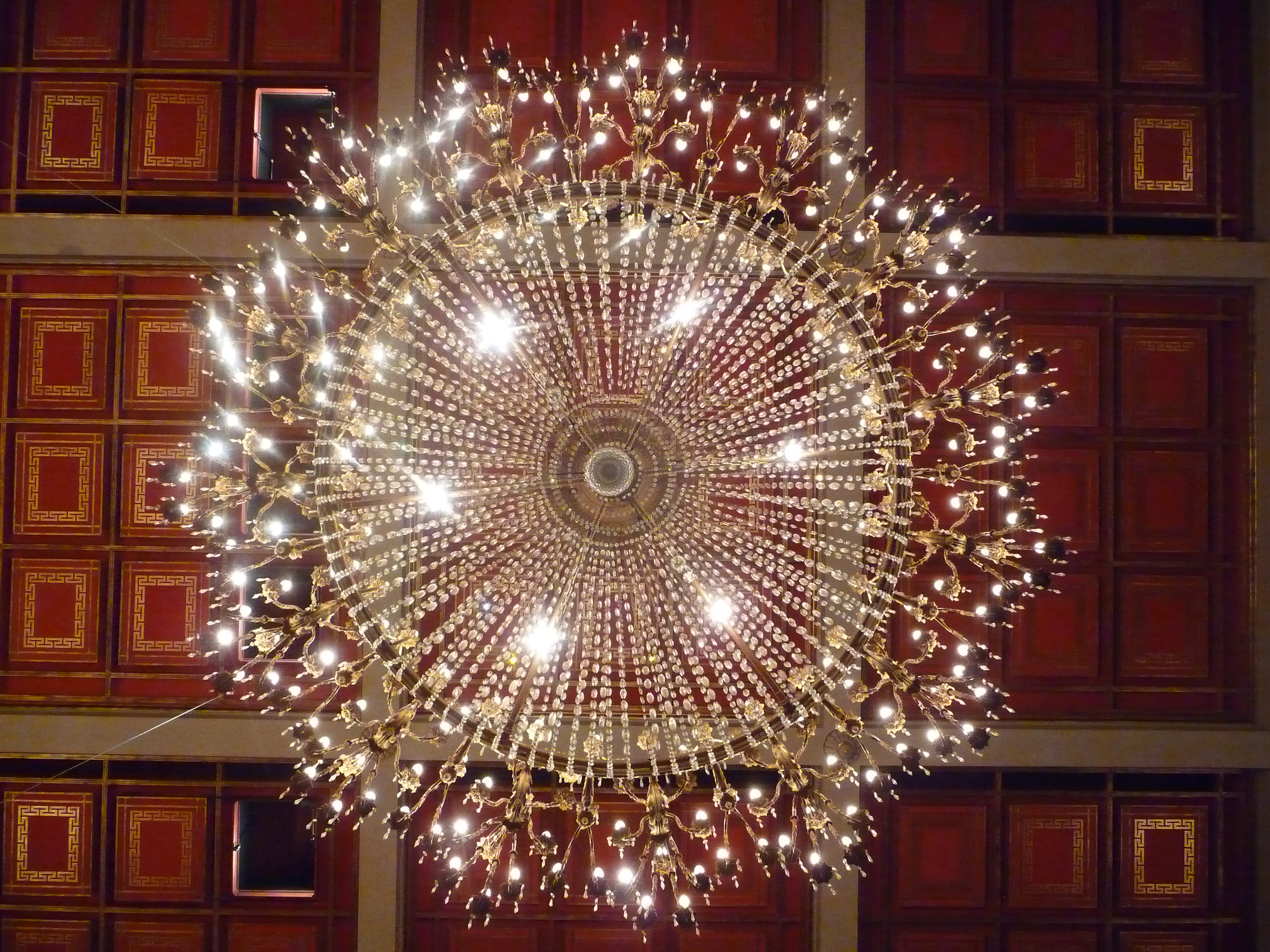
One of the many elegant chandeliers in the Kurhaus

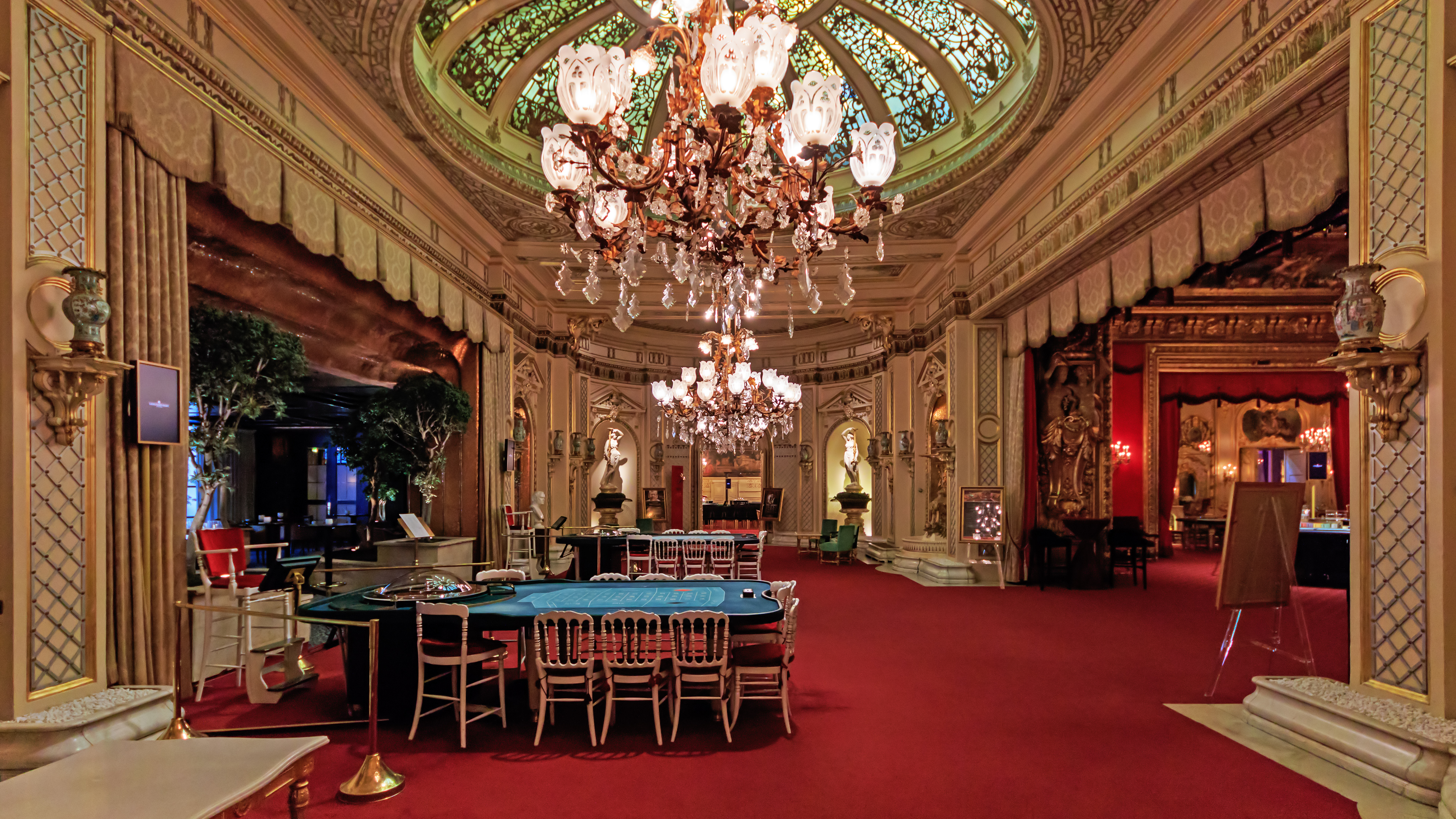
One of the halls of the Casino

Over the course of nearly two centuries, the famous resort has experienced its ups and downs. The number of wealthy tourists diminished, for example, during the midst of the First World War. However, by the 1920s, some of those who were made wealthy by the Great War were displacing the titled Europeans who had contributed to building Kurhaus's reputation as a resort and casino.

== Host to international gatherings ==
The Baden-Baden conference center has hosted international events, congresses and summit meetings.

=== Chess tourney ===
In 1925, twentieth step in the international chess masters' tournament was played at Kurhaus., The Kurhaus round of play spanned the period between April 16 and May 14, after a rest break was scheduled before the twenty-first and final round would begin in Marienbad on May 23.

=== Olympic congress ===
From September 23 to September 28, 1981, the XIth Olympic Congress was convened in the Kurhaus. The 84th session of International Olympic Committee (IOC) meeting was expanded to encompass a broader range of representatives interested in the success and evolution of the Olympic movement. The Congress brought together delegates from the 147 nations that compete in the Games and participants from 26 international sporting federations.

In addition, each of the five cities seeking to be named as an Olympic venue sent representatives to Baden-Baden. Each group made an official presentation, and the next day the I.O.C. voted. Calgary and Seoul were selected to host the 1988 Winter and Summer Olympics.

=== NATO summit ===
The first official event of the 2009 Strasbourg-Kehl summit was a working dinner in the Florentine Room (Florentiner Saal) on the evening of April 3, 2009 at the Kurhaus. The large horse-shoe table was set with 28 places, allowing each leader to see and hear each other as they ate and talked together. The event was webcast live. It displayed the table as well as the Kurhaus' chandeliers. A brief program of classical music in the Kurhaus auditorium preceded the dinner, with violinist Anne-Sophie Mutter playing works from European and American composers, including selections from Johannes Brahms' Hungarian Dances and the Hoe-down from Aaron Copland's Rodeo.

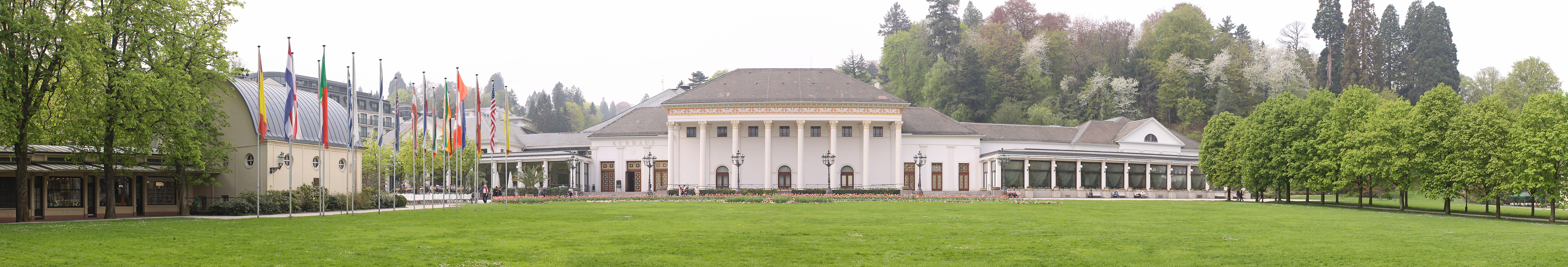
Kurhaus with spa garden, on the left the Kurhaus colonnades and the concert shell, on the right the casino

== See also ==
- Trinkhalle
- Kurhaus of Wiesbaden
