= Botanischer Garten Karlsruhe =

Botanical garden in Karlsruhe, Baden-Württemberg, Germany

Coordinates: 49.0132°N 8.4002°E

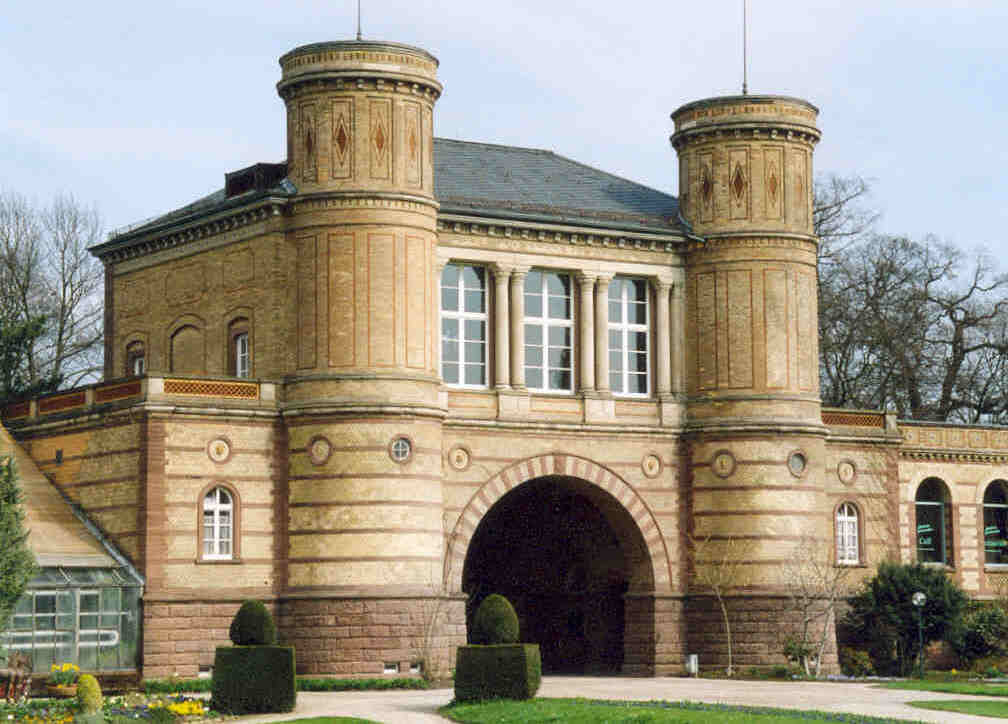
Gate house of the Botanischer Garten

The Botanischer Garten Karlsruhe is a municipal botanical garden located in Karlsruhe, Baden-Württemberg, Germany. This garden should not be confused with the nearby Botanical Garden of the KIT operated by the Karlsruhe Institute of Technology (KIT).

The garden was established by Charles III William, Margrave of Baden-Durlach and designed by Karl Christian Gmelin. Between 1853 and 1857, three plant houses were created by architect Heinrich Hübsch. The buildings were severely damaged or destroyed in World War II, but reconstructed as follows: camellia and flower house, rebuilt 1952 for cactus and succulent exhibition; palm house, rebuilt 1955 to 1956; tropical house, restored in the 1950s. The plant houses are open daily except Monday; an admission fee is charged. The grounds contain several rare trees from the 19th century amid newer plantings.

== See also ==
- Botanical Garden of the KIT
- List of botanical gardens in Germany
