= 2009 Strasbourg–Kehl NATO summit =

2009 NATO summit meeting in Strasbourg, France, and Kehl and Baden-Baden, Germany

Strasbourg–Kehl summit
- Strasbourg–Kehl summit logo
- Host countries: France; Germany
- Dates: 3–4 April 2009
- Venues: Palais de la musique et des congrès (Strasbourg, France), Kurhaus of Baden-Baden and Kehl, Germany.
- Website: nato.int/docu/comm/2009/0904-summit/index.html

The 2009 Strasbourg–Kehl Summit was the NATO summit of heads of state and heads of government held in Strasbourg, France, and in Kehl and Baden-Baden, Germany, on 3–4 April 2009. The summit marked the 60th anniversary of the establishment of North Atlantic Treaty Organization (NATO). Primarily a celebratory 60th-anniversary event, the agenda included a number of urgent topics commanding the NATO leaders' attention. This is the summit following Albania and Croatia's accession to NATO.

== Summit participants ==
=== Hosts ===
To symbolize an evolving vision of European cooperation, for the first time a NATO summit was jointly hosted by two member nations: France, led by President Nicolas Sarkozy, and Germany, led by German Chancellor Angela Merkel.

The formal meetings were chaired by NATO Secretary General Jaap de Hoop Scheffer. This was the last summit for de Hoop Scheffer, whose 61st birthday, coincidentally, came just one day before this 60th-anniversary summit.

Although the first of the significant summit events in Germany was held in Baden-Baden, the town was left off the official logo. This led to protests from local politicians; but the result was a comparatively calm beginning to a summit which also provided the opportunity for dramatic protests on the second day.

=== In attendance ===
- Albania – President Bamir Topi
- Belgium – Prime Minister Herman Van Rompuy
- Bulgaria – President Georgi Parvanov
- Canada – Prime Minister Stephen Harper
- Croatia – President Stipe Mesić
- Czech Republic – Prime Minister Mirek Topolánek
- Denmark – Prime Minister Anders Fogh Rasmussen
- Estonia – Prime Minister Andrus Ansip
- France – President Nicolas Sarkozy
- Germany – Chancellor Angela Merkel
- Greece – Prime Minister Kostas Karamanlis
- Hungary – Prime Minister Ferenc Gyurcsány
- Iceland – Foreign Minister Össur Skarphéðinsson
- Italy – Prime Minister Silvio Berlusconi
- Latvia – Prime Minister Valdis Dombrovskis
- Lithuania – Prime Minister Andrius Kubilius
- Luxembourg – Prime Minister Jean-Claude Juncker
- Netherlands – Prime Minister Jan Peter Balkenende
- Norway – Prime Minister Jens Stoltenberg
- Poland – President Lech Kaczyński
- Portugal – Prime Minister José Sócrates
- Romania Prime Minister Emil Boc
- Slovakia– President Ivan Gašparovič
- Slovenia – Prime Minister Borut Pahor
- Spain – Prime Minister José Luis Rodríguez Zapatero
- Turkey – President Abdullah Gül
- United Kingdom – Prime Minister Gordon Brown
- United States – President Barack Obama

== Summit agenda ==
Details of the agenda were withheld until the last minute.

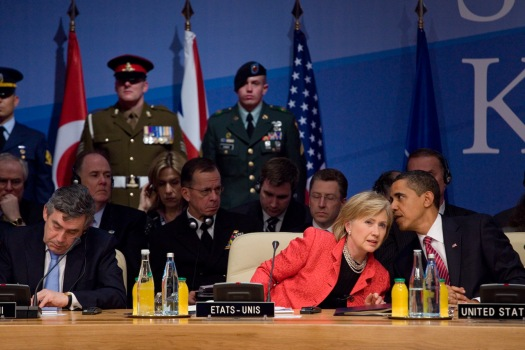
At the North Atlantic Council meeting on 4 April 2009 in Strasbourg, left to right: U.K. Prime Minister Gordon Brown, U.S. Secretary of State Hillary Clinton, and U.S. President Barack Obama

United States President Barack Obama posed a unique quandary as Europeans asked themselves how best to respond to an ally who is sending all the signals they had desired.

On Friday, 3 April 2009, the summit's first official event was a working dinner at the Kurhaus, Baden-Baden.

The first event on Saturday, 4 April 2009, focused on Chancellor Merkel's welcome to the NATO leaders as they arrived individually in Kehl, Germany. Then, having gathered on the German side of the Rhine River, the NATO Leaders walked together across the Passerelle pedestrian bridge to Strasbourg, France. The NATO leaders were greeted at the French border by President Sarkozy. Meetings were held at the Palais de la musique et des congrès with an arrival ceremony at the Palais Rohan, Strasbourg.

On the French side of the Rhine, the 28 national leaders posed for the NATO "family portrait", a tradition at NATO summits. Then the main work began with a working lunch and at other meetings in Strasbourg.

In addition, several heads of state, government leaders and other principals were involved in non–summit events which encompassed individual and/or bilateral events on the margins of the formal summit agenda.

=== Issues ===
After 60 years, NATO found itself on the cusp of a watershed period in the organization's history; and top items on the agenda included:

==== Afghanistan war ====
Some have argued that the most critical issue NATO faces in 2009 arises from Afghanistan. Any NATO discussion about Afghanistan involves developing a comprehensive strategy which brings non-NATO regional powers into a discussion about how best to proceed in short- and longer-term time frames. Although the newly elected Obama continued to enjoy a reservoir of good will, experts anticipated only token gestures of support for any plan which involves increased levels of European troops. In the end, the allies managed to find more reasons for consensus than had been expected, and the increases in the various commitments from the Europeans was a little greater than had been anticipated.

==== Relations with Russia ====
Russia's relationships with the West are a perennial NATO concern. Obama summarized his view of the dialogue with Russia about maintaining stability while protecting the autonomy of all countries in Europe: "I think that it is important for NATO allies to engage Russia and to recognize that they have legitimate interests in some cases, we've got common interests, but we also have some core disagreements."

==== France's reintegration ====
France's decision to seek reintegration with the NATO military hierarchy caused all the allies to evaluate the potential ramifications. In 1966, then-President Charles de Gaulle caused France to withdraw from the U.S.-led military command. Sarkozy determined that the time was ripe to change course radically, and the French Parliament backed this decision with a vote of confidence.

==== New strategic concept ====
The tumble of events in the past years has made it necessary to re-examine NATO's core strategic concepts. This re-assessment opens up possibilities for change and for plausible "new" strategies and "new" assumptions as well. At this summit, the allied leaders moved forward in a process which is expected to result in a new strategic doctrine which will be formally adopted at next year's summit in Lisbon, Portugal. The updated vision of NATO contemplates a range of expanded responsibilities, including out-of-area operations in Afghanistan and anti-piracy patrols near the Horn of Africa.

Unresolved questions surrounded all aspects of potential NATO expansion. On 1 April 2009, two days before the summit's first day, Albania and Croatia were accepted as full members of the organization. The President and Prime Minister of each of these newest NATO allies attended the summit. Official flag-raising ceremonies at NATO's headquarters in Brussels, Belgium, were planned for 7 April 2009.

Pre-summit speculation about the next NATO Secretary-General focused on five candidates: Bulgaria's former Foreign Minister Solomon Passy, Poland's Foreign Minister Radek Sikorski, Norway's Foreign Minister Jonas Gahr Støre, Canada's Defense Minister Peter MacKay, and Denmark's Prime Minister Anders Fogh Rasmussen. In the end, Rasmussen was chosen by consensus.

== Protests and security measures ==
In view of announced protests, French and German authorities announced plans to restrict access to and movement within designated security areas, including parts of Strasbourg and Kehl. These included the requirement that 700 local residents living in a restricted area of Kehl would not be allowed to leave their homes between Friday night and Saturday morning without requesting a police escort. In response, War Resisters International argued that the measures are contrary to the French constitution and the European Convention on Human Rights. Following negotiations, protest organizers accused German authorities of stalling tactics.

German police estimates anticipated that 25,000 protesters will seek to express themselves during the summit. 15,000 German police were on call for the weekend; and forces were augmented by Bundeswehr support, including interceptor planes, transport helicopters, paramedics, motorcycle escorts, buses and other vehicles. Major demonstrations and protest activities took place on Saturday in France, with 300 protestors arrested. In contrast, Baden-Baden's increased security preparations seemed not to affect an abiding sense of calm in the German resort town.

France temporarily reactivated border controls with neighboring European nations for two weeks in anticipation of the summit. These strict measures were designed to "guarantee security" and minimize terrorism risks during the summit. Special permission was granted to France and Germany to suspend the Schengen Agreement which guarantees free passage for all European Union citizens traveling between EU member states.

== See also ==
- Relations between France and NATO
