= Heinrich Hübsch =

German architect (1795–1863)

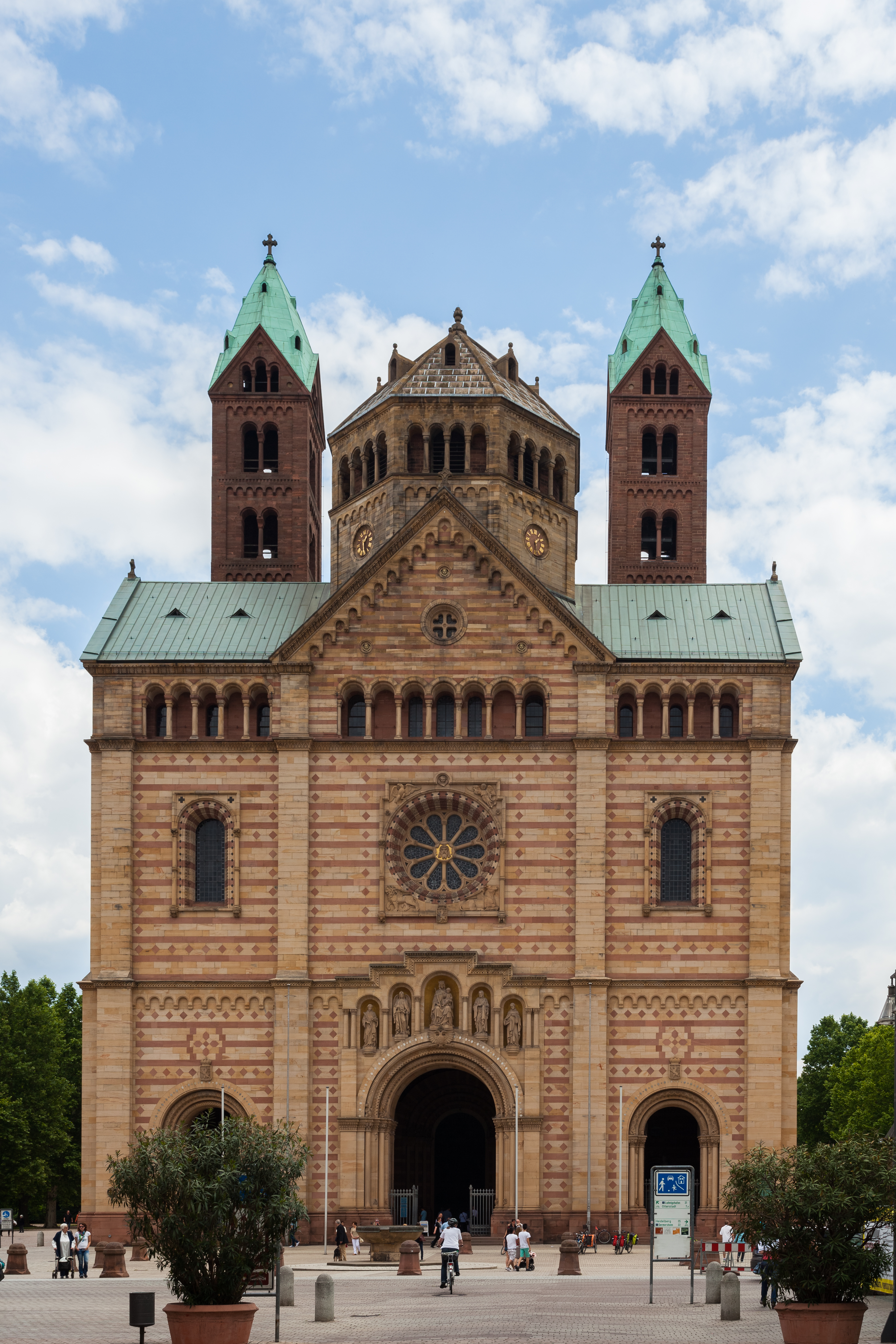
West facade of the Speyer Cathedral rebuilt by Heinrich Hübsch

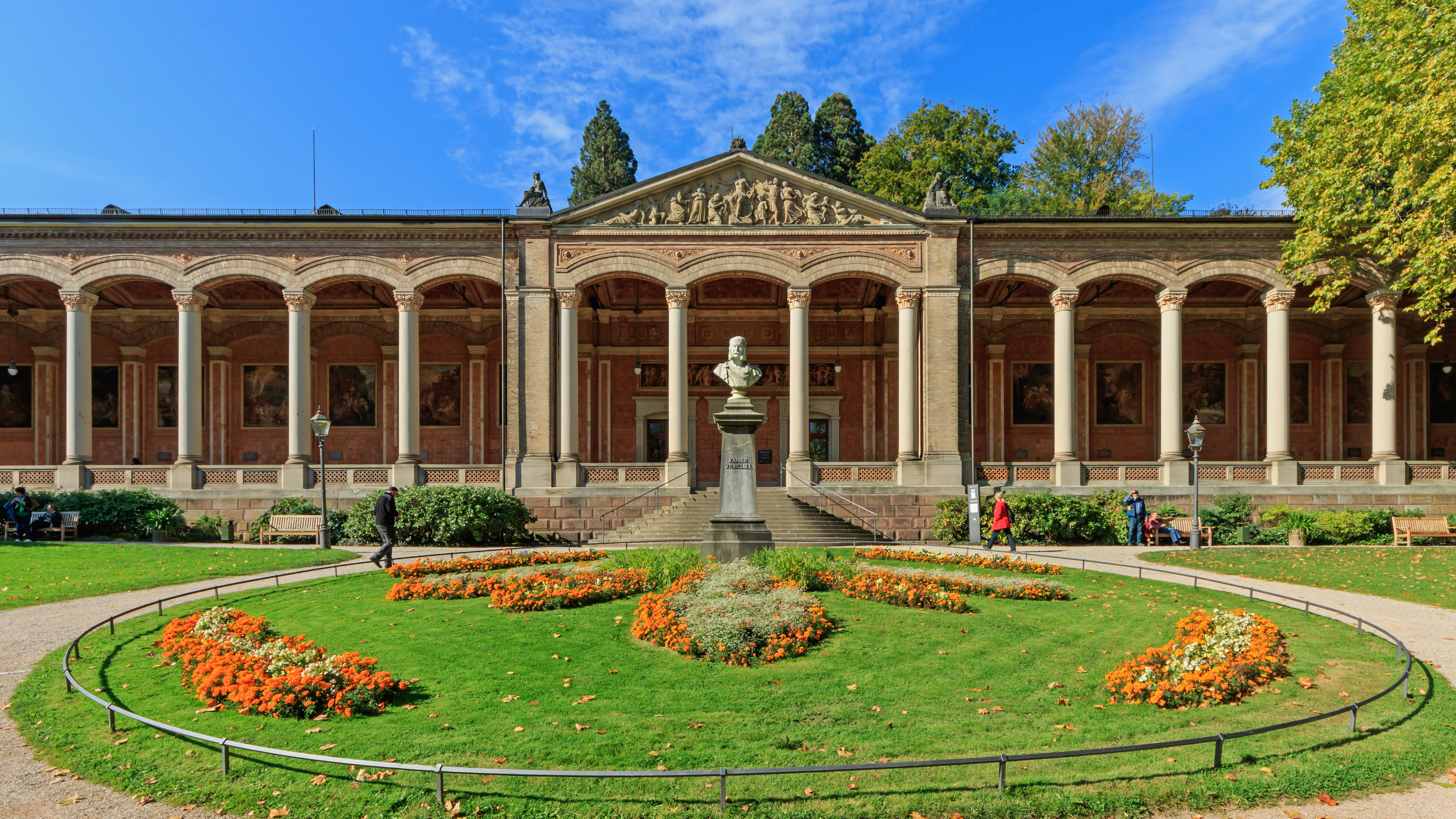
Trinkhalle (pump room) in Baden-Baden

Heinrich Hübsch (9 February 1795 – 3 April 1863) was a German architect. After studies in Heidelberg (1813–15) and at Friedrich Weinbrenner's school of architecture in Karlsruhe (1815–17) he traveled extensively in Greece and Italy (1817–24). In 1831 he was appointed Oberbaurat (inspector of buildings) at Karlsruhe. He designed many churches and other public buildings, mainly in the Grand Duchy of Baden, and is also known for his writings.

In his book In welchem Style sollen wir bauen? (In which style should we build?, 1828) he distanced himself from Weinbrenner's neoclassical style. Die altchristlichen Kirchen (Karlsruhe, 1862) is a work on basilican architecture, published also in French as Monuments de l'architecture chrétienne.

Hübsch is credited with creating the Rundbogenstil architectural style.

== Publications ==
(s:de:Heinrich Hübsch)

== Buildings ==
- Polytechnical School, main building, Karlsruhe, 1833–1835
- Staatliche Kunsthalle Karlsruhe, 1836–1846
- Kassel Synagogue, 1839 (destroyed by the Nazis in November 1938 during the Kristallnacht)
- Trinkhalle, Baden-Baden, 1839–1842
- Bruchsal penitentiary, 1841–1848
- Karlsruhe Botanical Garden, plant houses, 1853–1857
- Speyer Cathedral westwork, 1854–1858
- Kath. Kirche St. Cyriakus, Beiertheim-Bulach 1835-1837
