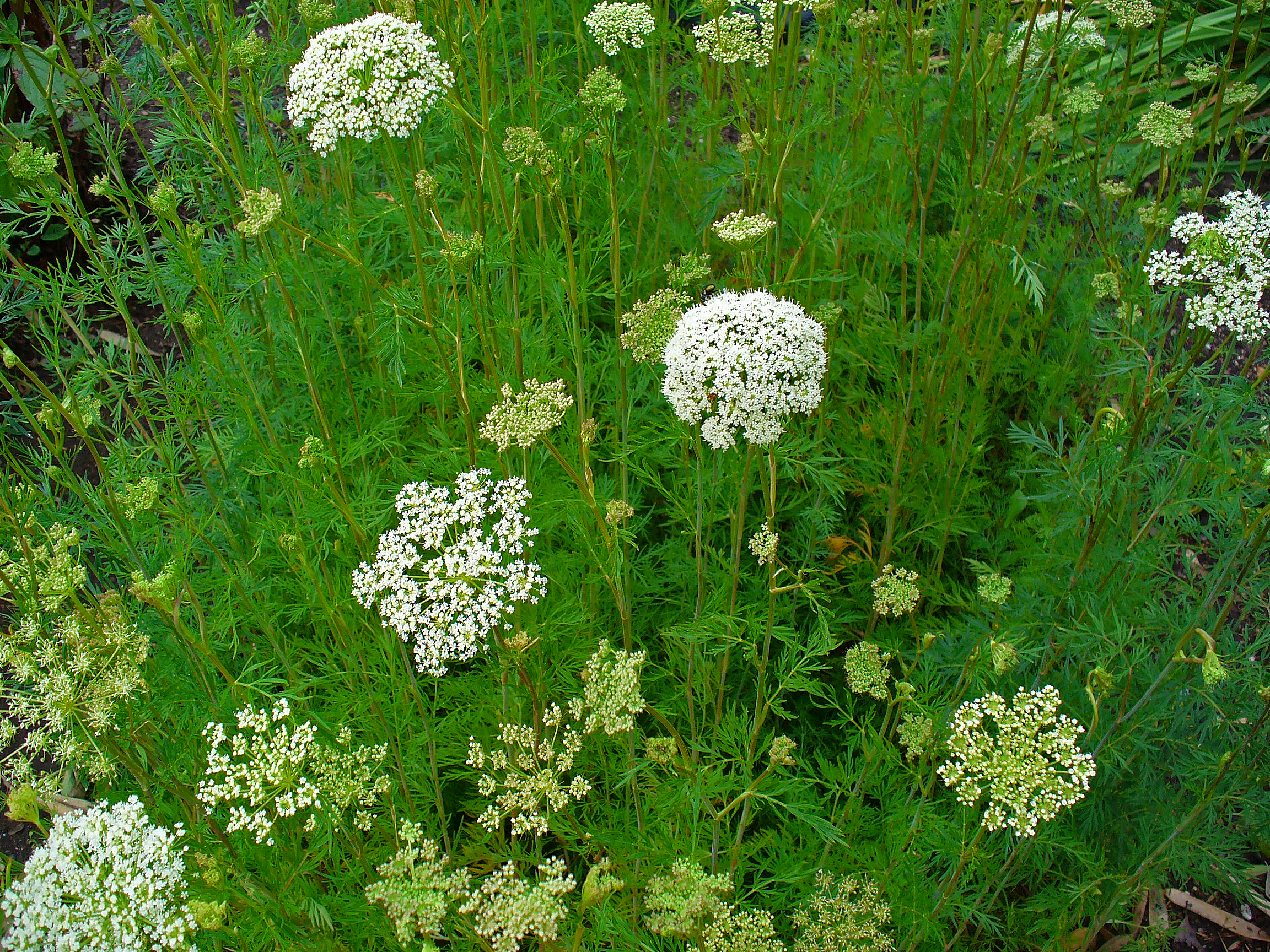

Scientific classification
- Kingdom: Plantae
- Clade: Tracheophytes
- Clade: Angiosperms
- Clade: Eudicots
- Clade: Asterids
- Order: Apiales
- Family: Apiaceae
- Genus: Kadenia
- Species: K. dubia

Binomial name
- Kadenia dubia (Schkuhr) Lavrova & V.N.Tikhom.

= Kadenia dubia =

Species of flowering plant

Kadenia dubia is a species of flowering plant belonging to the family Apiaceae.

Its native range is Europe to Siberia and Kazakhstan.

Synonym:

- Cnidium dubium (Schkuhr) Schmeil & Fitschen
