= Fremersberg =

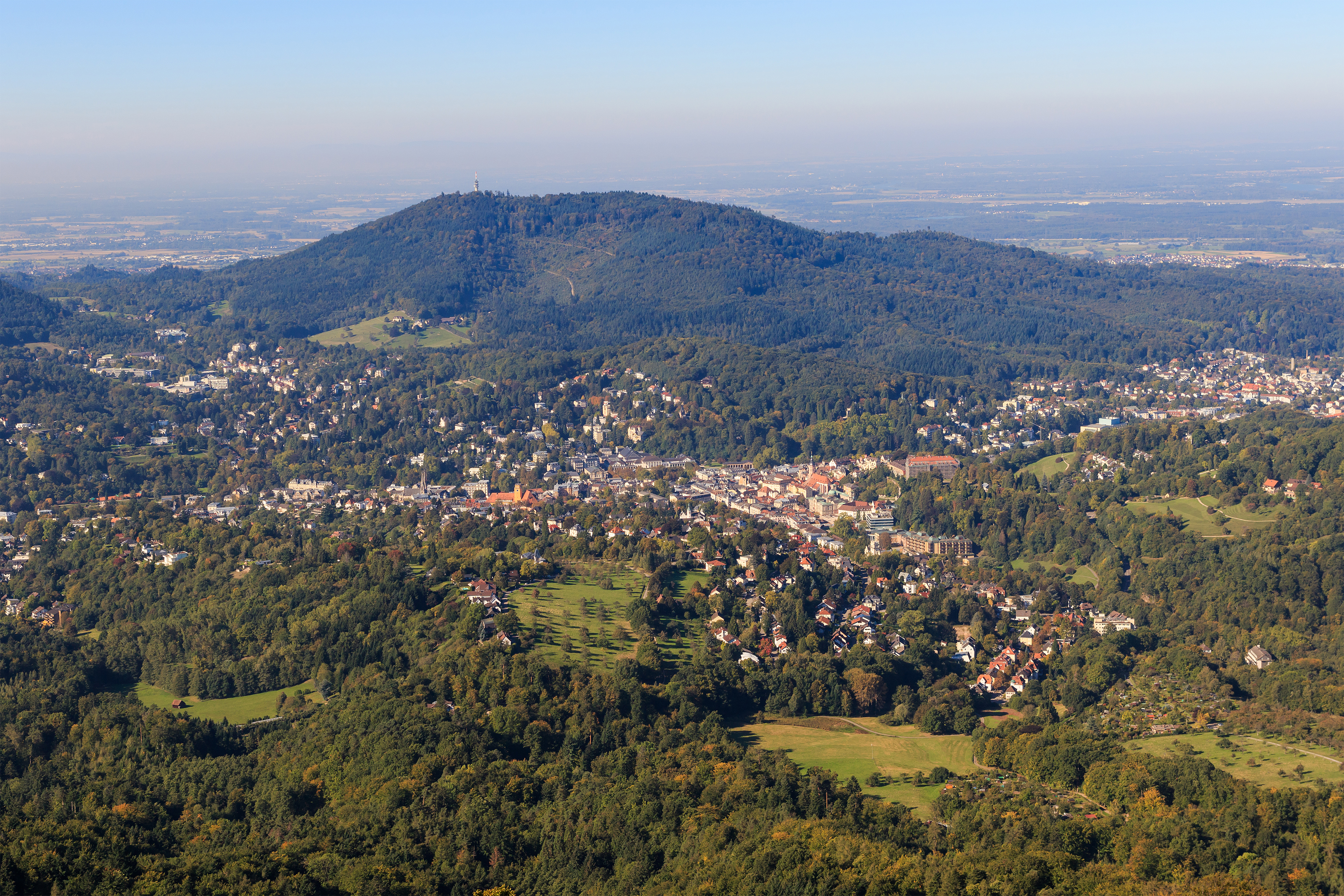

Highest point
- Elevation: 525 m (1,722 ft)
- Coordinates: 48°45′N 8°12′E

Geography
- Location within Baden-Württemberg
- Location: Baden-Württemberg, Germany

The Fremersberg is a hill, 524.6 m above sea level (NHN), on the western edge of the northern Black Forest in south Germany on the territory of the town of Baden-Baden and the municipality of Sinzheim. On the summit plateau, which is made of bunter sandstone there is the residential area of Fremersberg Turm with rented inn, which was built by the town of Baden-Baden in 1884, and the 85-metre-high Fremersberg Tower, built in 1961, a transmission tower with an observation platform.

== Fremersberg Tower ==
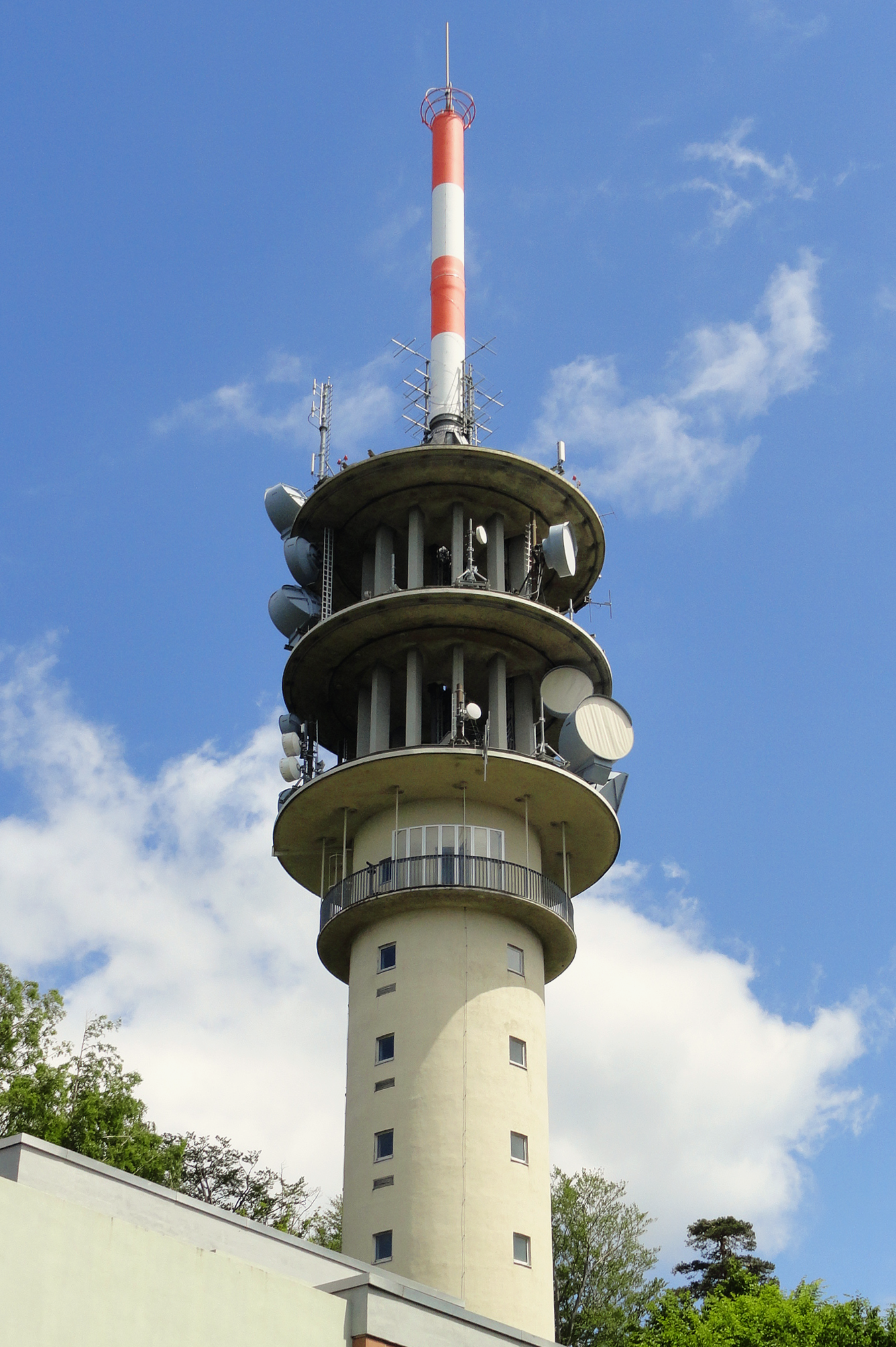
The Fremersberg Transmitter with its viewing platform below the transmission facility

The construction of the first viewing tower on the Fremersberg was finished in 1883. It was raised in 1900 to a height of around 28 metres (92 ft), using rubble stone from a Sinzheim quarry. In 1954 it had to be demolished due to its instability and consequent danger of collapse. By July 1954 a new tower had been built from the old stone that was more stable. As the establishment of a TV studio for Südwestfunk in Hans-Bredow-Straße in Baden-Baden required a permanent microwave relay station, the tower was pulled down for aesthetic reasons and rebuilt. It now acted both as a viewing tower and as the necessary transmission site. This work was completed in autumn 1961 and the new transmission tower was opened with a viewing platform at a height of 30 metres.

== Surrounding area ==
The Fremersberg lies west of the town of Baden-Baden and, together with the Yberg, separates it from the Rebland municipalities of Varnhalt, Steinbach and Neuweier. From the Fremersberg Tower there are views of the Baden-Baden basin, the Upper Rhine Plain and the Vosges to the west. To the east may be seen the Northern Black Forest including the mountain of Merkur. To the northeast can be seen the Battert with its climbing rocks and the ruins of Hohenbaden Castle.

On the southern slopes of the Fremersberg is Fremersberg Abbey, an exclave of the Sinzheim municipality. One of the 14 regional legends is based around the former Franciscan abbey and is described in pictures in the Trinkhalle Baden-Baden. On the northwestern side of the Fremersberg lies the Fremersberg Hunting Lodge. Dowager Margravine Sibylle of Saxe-Lauenburg had it built for her sons in the years 1716–21 by Johann Michael Ludwig Rohrer.

== In popular culture ==
The symphonic poem Der Fremersberg (1853) by Bohemian composer Miloslaw Koennemann (1826-1890) relates to the hill.
