= Eisental =

Village in Rastatt, Germany

Coordinates: 48°42′N 8°10′E

Eisental is a village to the Northeast of Bühl (Baden) in the State of Baden-Württemberg in Southwest Germany. In 1972, Eisental became a suburb of the town of Bühl (Baden), together with the villages of Altschweier, Weitenung, Oberbruch, Balzhofen, Oberweier and Neusatz (Bühl). In 2004, the population of Eisental was about 2,000. Eisental itself is a result of a merger with three hamlets: Horrenbach, Müllenbach and Affental.

== Geography ==
Eisental is located on top of the foothills of the Northern Black Forest bordering the Upper Rhine valley between Steinbach (Baden) and Bühl (Baden).

== Infrastructure ==
Eisental is about 2 miles (or 3 kilometers) away from the town of Bühl (Baden). It can be reached from Bühl via the highway Bundesstraße_3.

== Economy ==
The foothills of the Black Forest and their high quality soil offer perfect conditions for growing a variety of fruits. Wine is grown in the steep hills facing South; the sun penetrates the dense leaves much better, which results in improved levels of sugar and alcohol, respectively, critical for a good wine. This has elevated the region to one of the top wine growing regions in Germany, with Riesling and Pinot_noir, the latter in Germany known as 'Spätburgunder', the two predominant grape varieties grown. The wine from these grapes are bottled at the Affentaler Winzergenossenschaft.

== Religion ==
The Catholic parish church in Steinbach was the mother church for many places in the area, such as Eisental, but also other villages and towns, Iffezheim, Stollhofen, Sinzheim, Vimbuch, Bühl (Baden), Weitenung, Neuweier and Varnhalt. Eisental became an independent parish around 1810, after being split from the mother parish of Steinbach, thereby establishing its own parish St. Matthew.

Historic family names of inhabitants from the town of Eisental have been compiled in a family book from the church registers of Steinbach from the 17th century. Notable family names were: Lamprecht, Harprecht, Dresel, Mayer, Moser, Volmer, Graf, Seiter, Feist, Wäldele, Senn, etc.
