= Merkur Funicular Railway =

Coordinates: 48°45′46.62″N 8°15′52.75″E

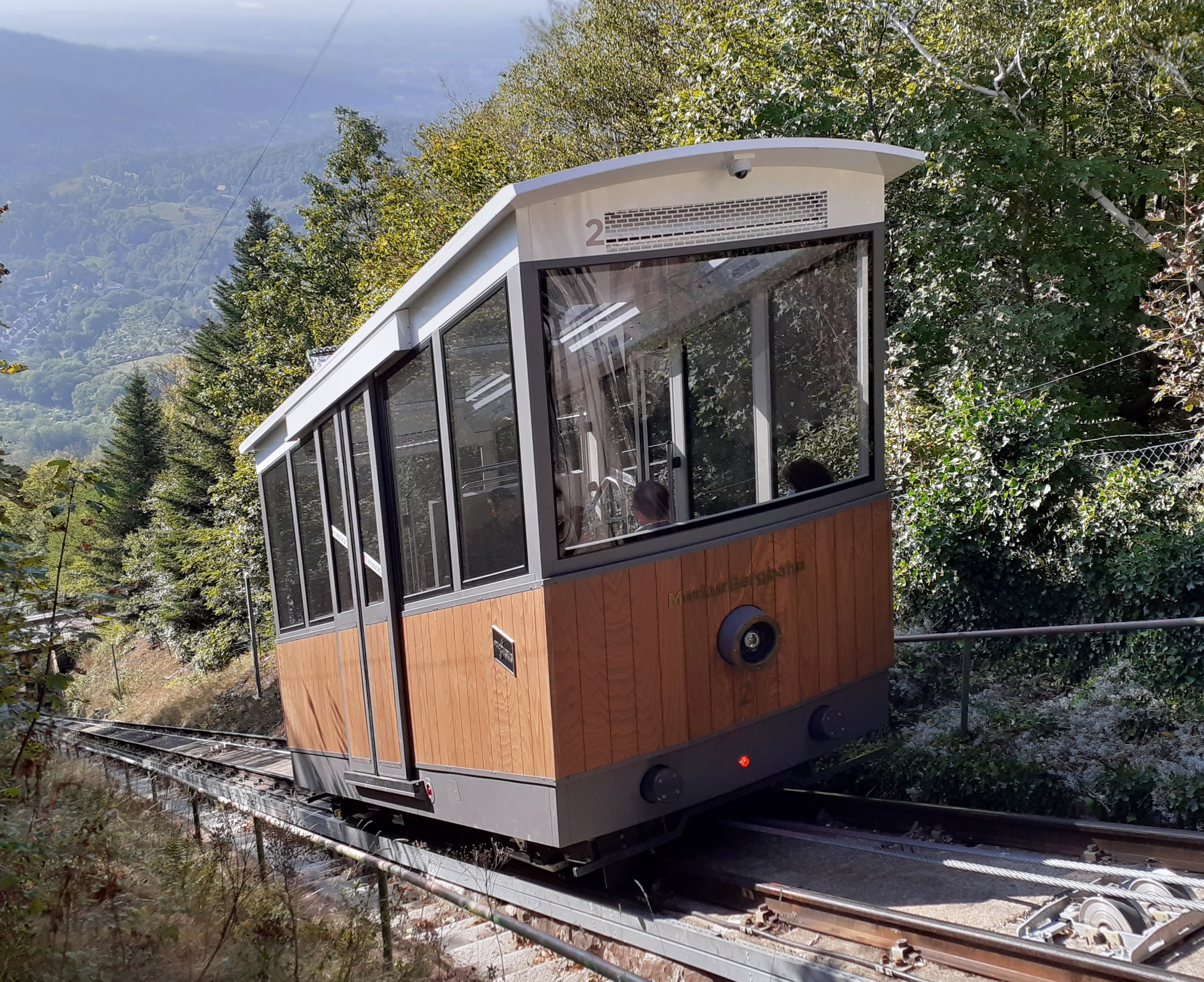
One of the new cars introduced in 2020

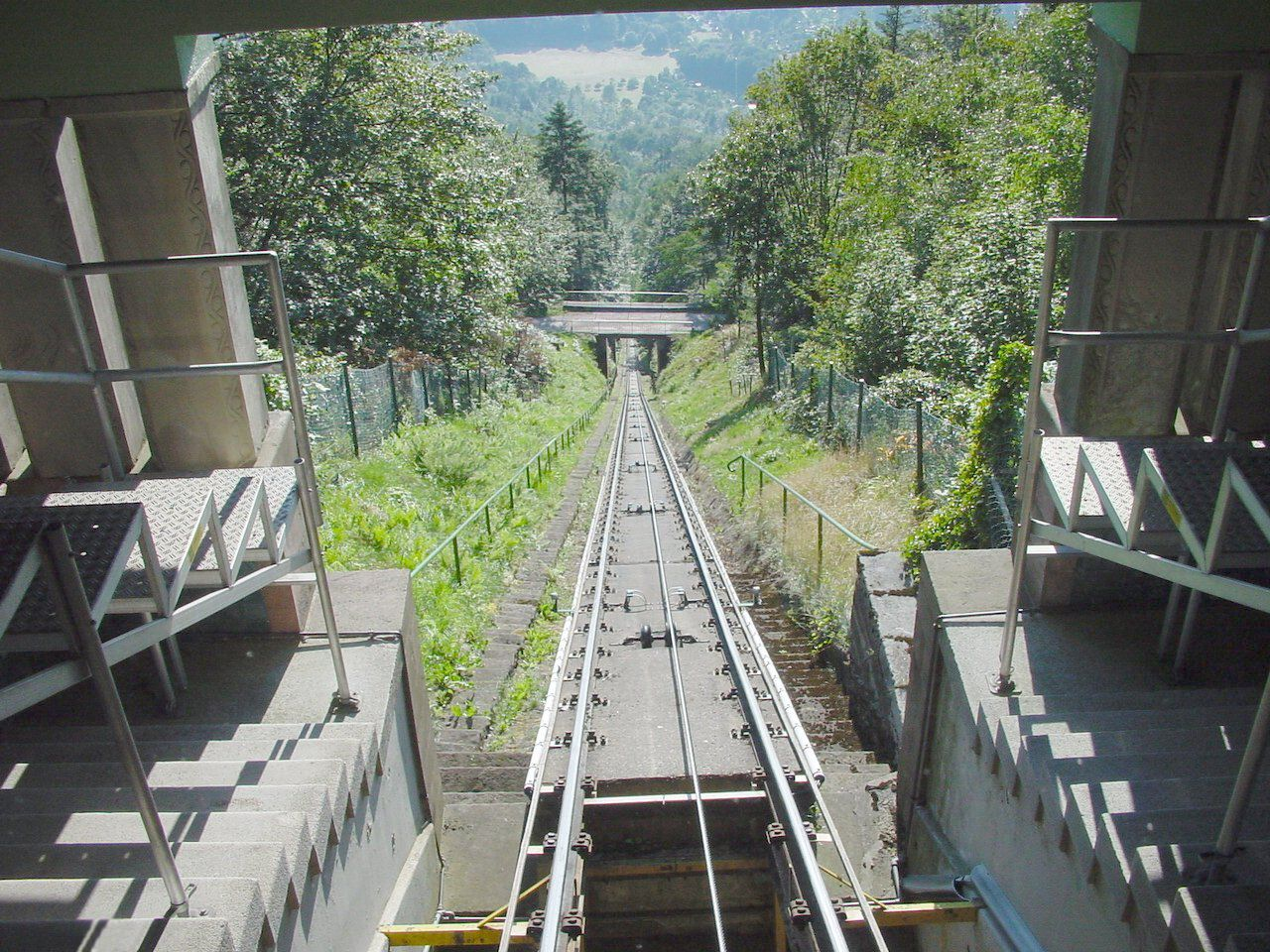
Looking down the line from the upper station

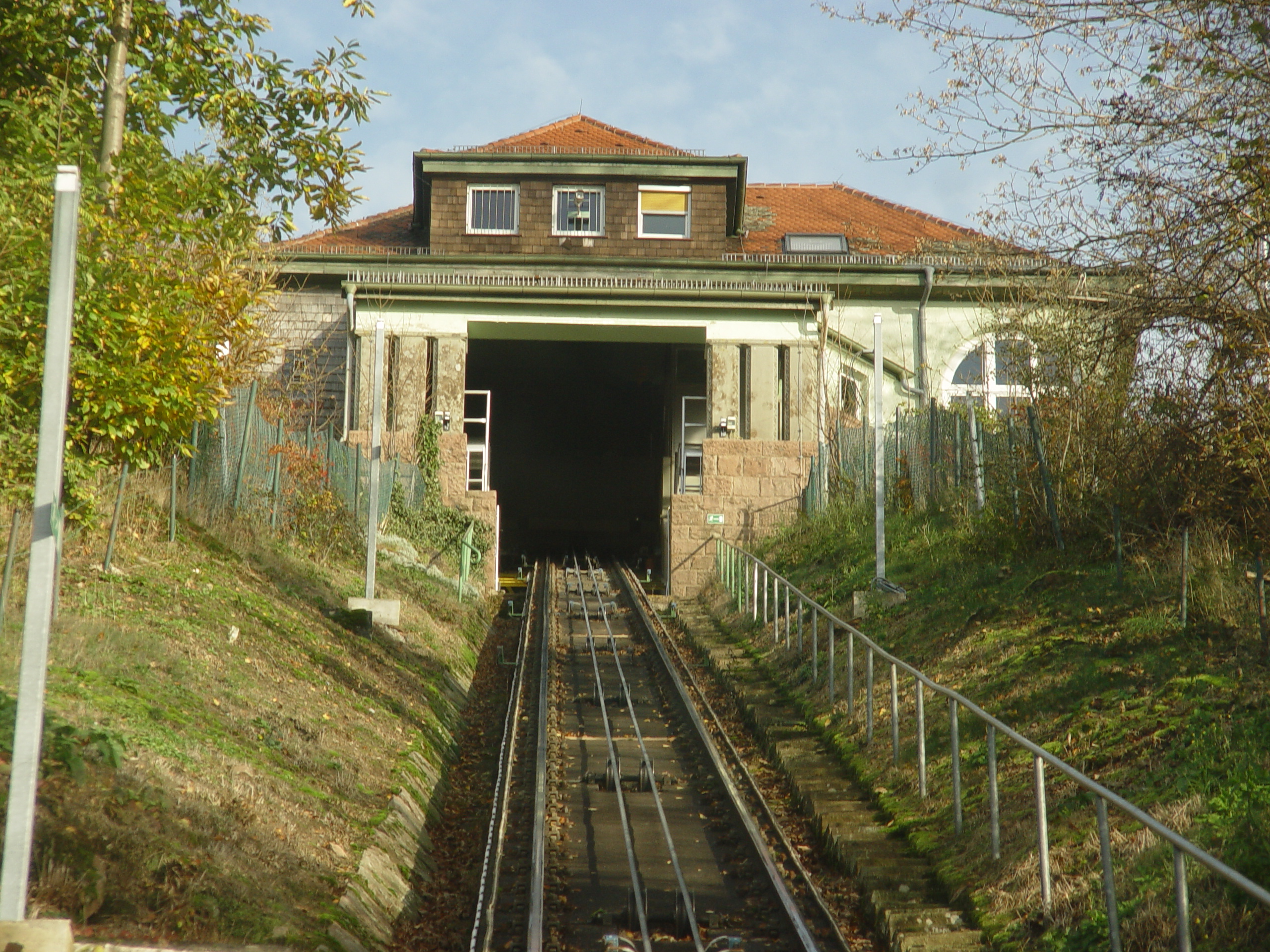
The upper station

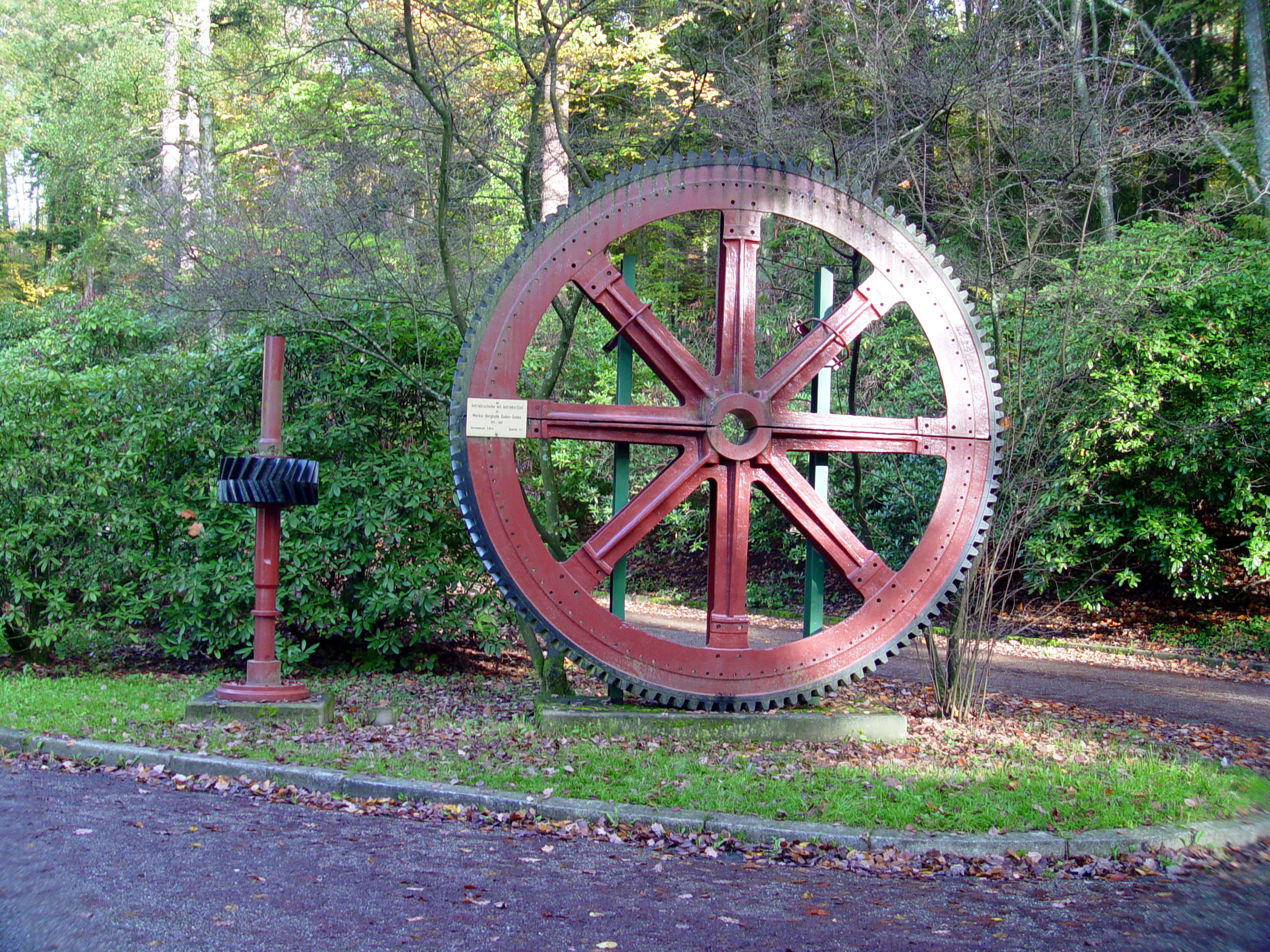
Drive wheel of the Merkurbergbahn from 1913 to 1967

The Merkur Funicular Railway (German: Merkurbergbahn) is a metre gauge funicular railway in the town of Baden-Baden in Baden-Württemberg, Germany. The line ascends the town's Hausberg, the Merkur (668.3 m), atop which is the Merkur Tower.

The line opened in 1913 and closed in 1967. It was reopened on 27 April 1979.

The funicular has the following technical parameters:

- Length: 1,192 metres (3,911 ft)
- Height: 370 metres (1,214 ft)
- Maximum steepness: 54%
- Cars: 2
- Capacity: 38 passengers per car
- Track gauge: 1,000 mm (3 ft 3 3/8 in)
- Traction: Electricity
- Control: Automatic

== See also ==
- List of funicular railways
