= Merkur (mountain) =

Mountain in Germany

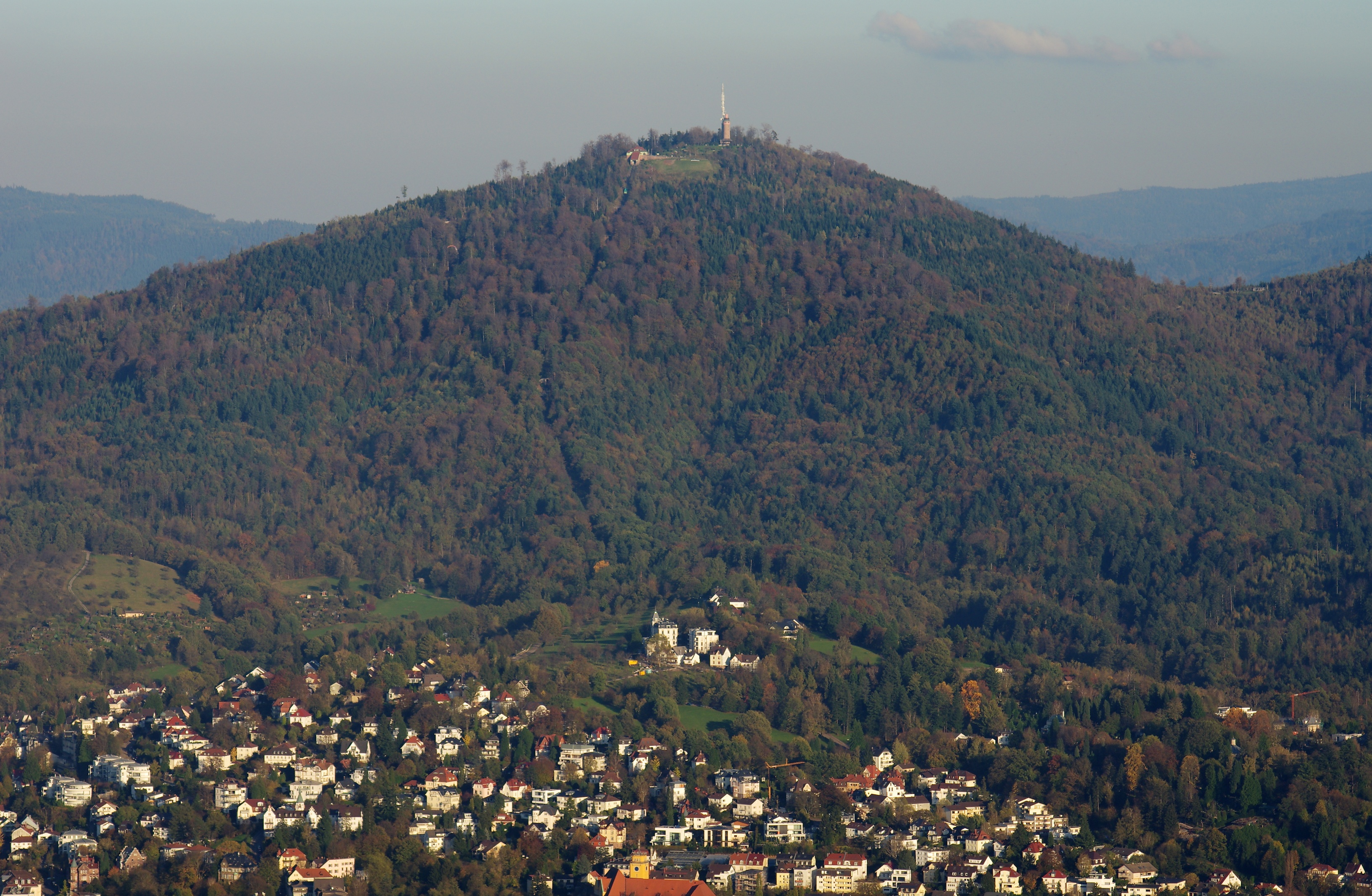
- Merkur and Baden-Baden seen from Fremersberg

Highest point
- Elevation: 668.3 m (2,193 ft)
- Coordinates: 48°45′42″N 08°16′50″E

Geography
- Location within Baden-Württemberg
- Location: Baden-Baden, Gernsbach, Germany

The Merkur or Großer Staufenberg is a mountain, 668.3 m above sea level (NHN), in the Northern Black Forest, Baden-Württemberg, Germany. It is the Hausberg of Baden-Baden and located between the spa town and the town of Gernsbach.

== Name ==
The mountain is named after the Ancient Roman god of trade and commerce, Mercury, to whom a Roman votive stone on the summit is dedicated. The Merkurstein has been recorded since the 16th century. Today, there is a cast of the original votive stone on the summit plateau; its prototype is in the Baden-Baden Municipal Museum collection. The original name of the free-standing conical mountain was the Großer Staufenberg, a reference to the shape of a turned drinking mug known as a Stauf.

== Funicular ==
The summit of the Merkur is only accessible on foot, by bicycle or on the Merkur Funicular Railway (the Merkurbergbahn) from Baden-Baden. The funicular was built in 1913 (113 years ago), closed in 1967 (59 years ago) for technical reasons, and re-opened in 1979 (47 years ago). It is 1,200 metres (3,900 ft) long, one of the longest railways of its type in Germany, and climbs gradients of up to 54%. There are good views of Baden-Baden during the ascent.

== Attractions ==
At the top station is a restaurant. Other attractions at the summit include a sunbathing lawn, a barbecue area and a play park with giant slide. Aimed at spa guests, but usable by anyone, are the so-called "terrain spa walks" (Terrainkurwege) of different lengths and gradients. One of these paths leads to the wildlife park at the foot of the mountain where there are red deer, fallow deer and mounflon. About half-way up the Merkur on the Baden-Baden side is the premium footpath, the Panorama Way (Panoramaweg). The summit of the Merkur is a waystop on two other premium footpaths: the Gernsbacher Runde and Murgleiter.

== Observation tower ==
An observation and radio tower stands on the highest point of the Merkur at 48°45′52″N 8°16′50″E. It was built in 1837 and was raised in height when the funicular was built. Since the 1950s it has also acted as a radio broadcast transmitter. A more recent reinforced concrete annex supports an antenna mast made of steel, reaching a total height of 63 metres (207 ft).

== Panorama ==
The mountain has an all-round view, not just over the bowl of Baden-Baden, the highest peaks of the Northern Black Forest and the Murg valley with the towns of Gaggenau and Gernsbach, but also of the Upper Rhine Plain, the Vosges, the Haardt and the Odenwald. In the field of view are the ruins of Hohenbaden Castle, the Battert rocks, the ruins of Alt Eberstein, the Fremersberg, the Yburg, the Badener Höhe and the Hornisgrinde as well as the cities of Karlsruhe and Strasbourg.

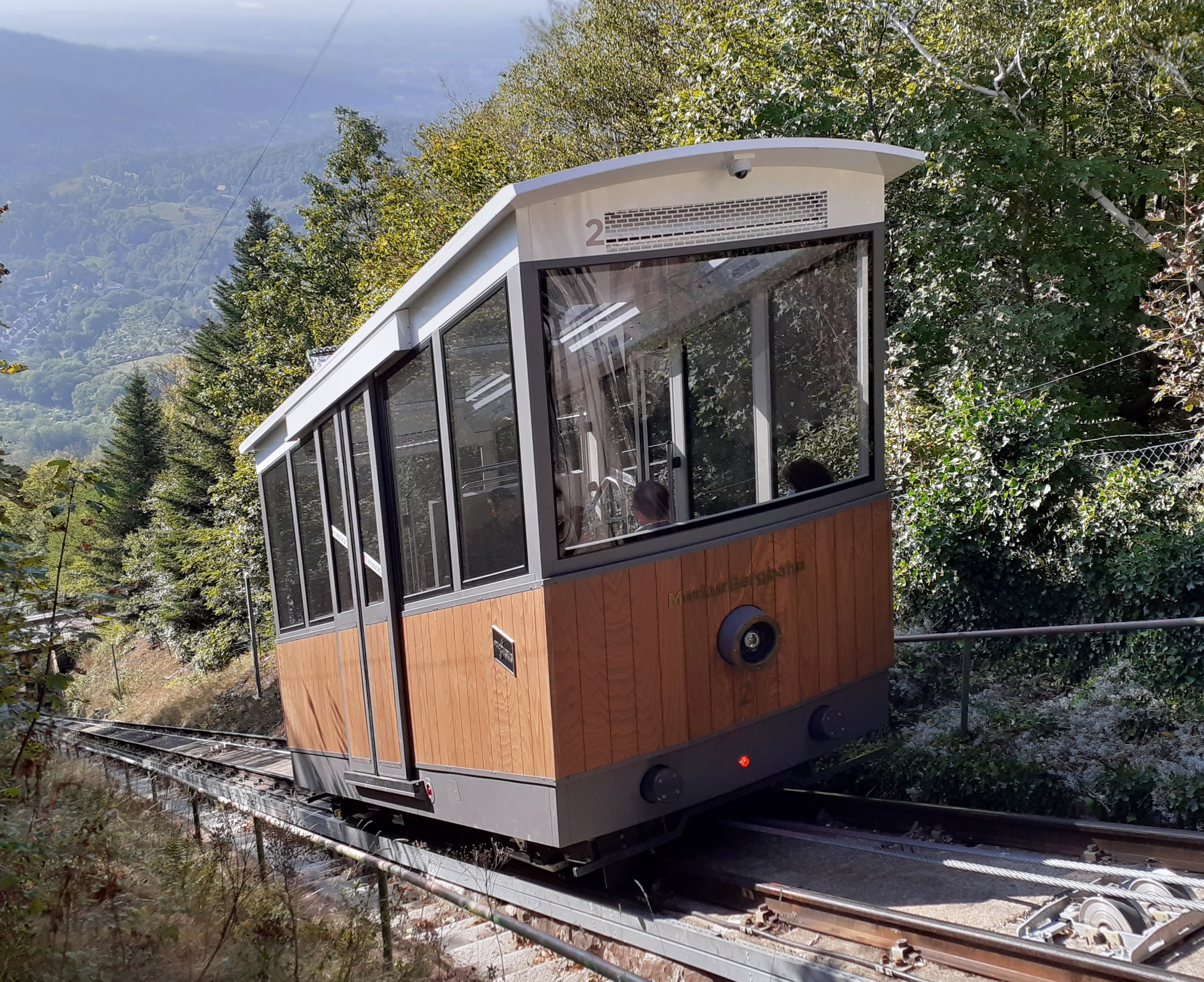
A car of the funicular railway

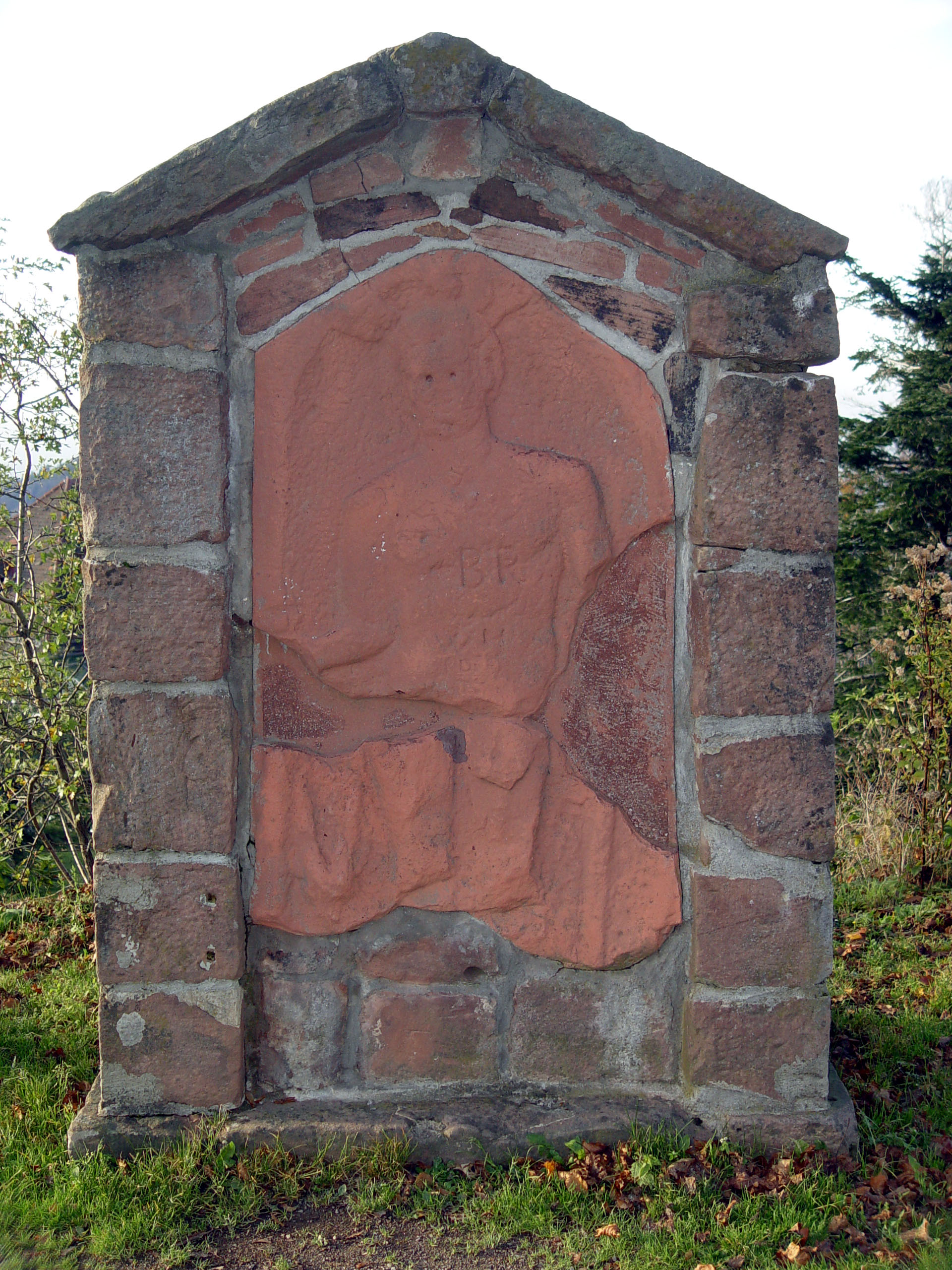
The ancient Roman votive relief of Mercury is on display on top of the mountain.

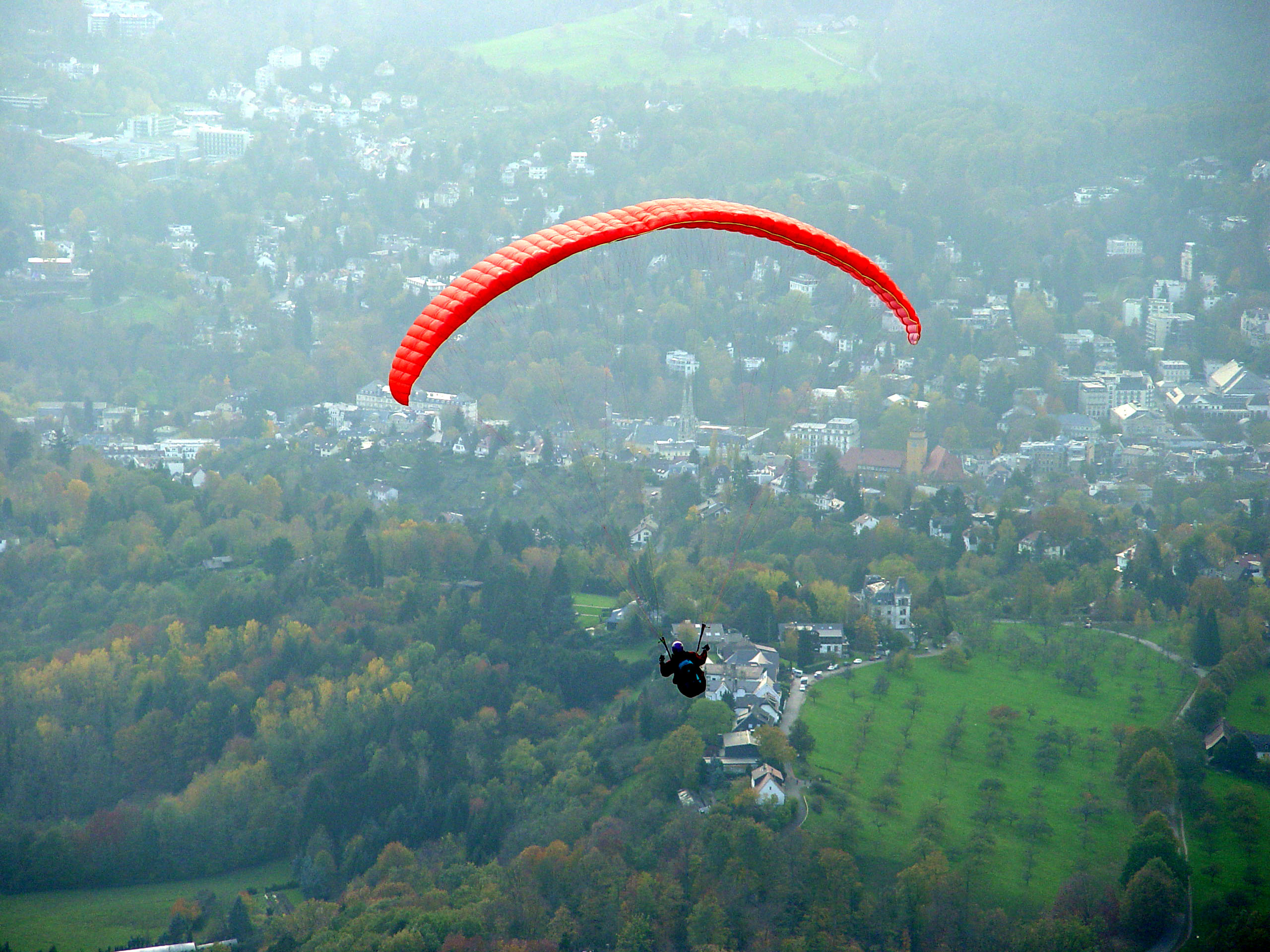
The Merkur is a popular launch site for paragliders.

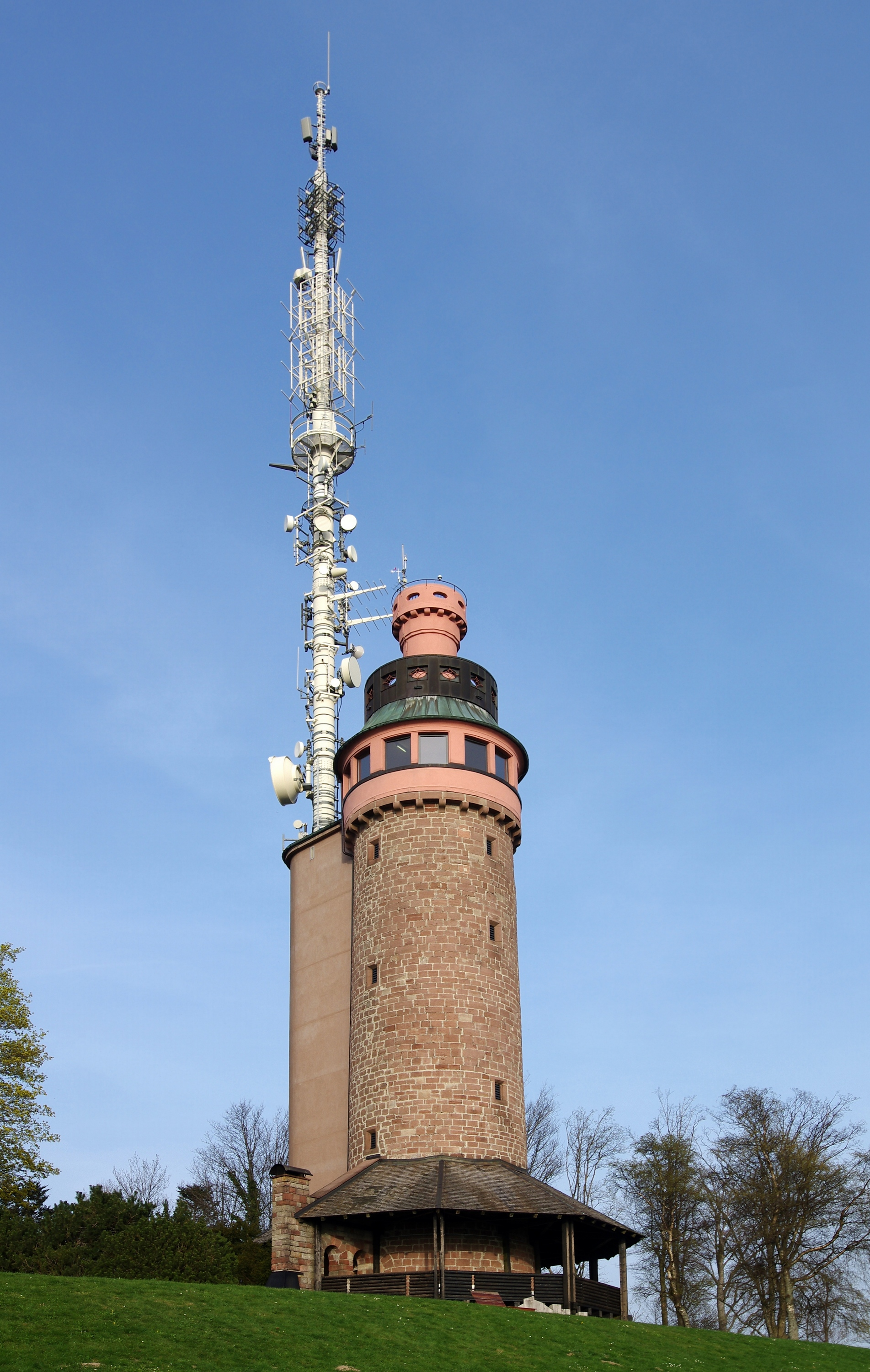
The observation tower

== In literature ==
The mountain is the setting for the short story Mercury by D. H. Lawrence, first published in the Atlantic Monthly in 1927.
