= Yburg Castle =

German castle

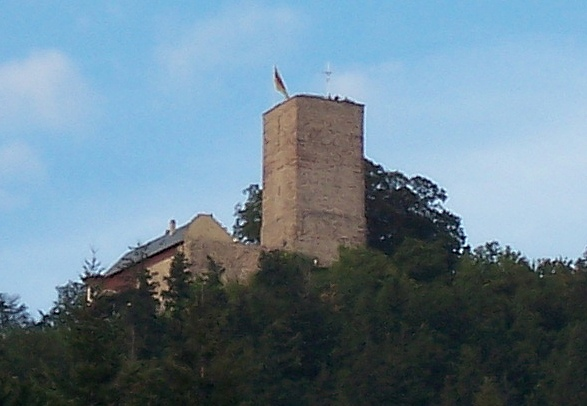
- Yburg Castle seen from the south

- Location within Baden-Württemberg Yburg Castle (Germany)

General information
- Location: Varnhalt, Germany
- Coordinates: 48.7306°N 8.2003°E

Website
- www.burg-yburg.de/start

The Yburg is a ruined hilltop castle atop the Yberg, on the western edge of the Black Forest near Baden-Baden, in southwestern Germany.

== History ==
In 1190, Herman V, Margrave of Baden-Baden inherited the rights to the villages of Steinbach and Sinzheim. As the Yburg would have secured the Margraviate of Baden's new southwest border, it can be assumed that they built it at this time. The surrounding territory increasingly came under Baden's influence from mid-13th century on; Eberstein Castle was constructed nearby, Hohenbaden Castle was enlarged, and Steinbach was fortified and given the status of a township. Until 1369, the Yburg was administered by the Röder von Rodeck family, who served the House of Baden as civil servants. In the 15th century, under Margrave Bernhard I, a bailiff resided at Yburg, and it is likely the castle received its eastern annex for their residence.

The Yburg was destroyed in 1525 during the German Peasants' War. In 1535, the Margraviate of Baden split into the rival Margraviates of Baden-Durlach and Baden-Baden, which then further split with the Baden-Rodemacher line. When the Baden-Baden line died out in 1588, Baden-Rodemacher's scion, Edward Fortunatus inherited Baden-Baden. According to legend, he and two alchemists practiced black magic in the castle. Edward Fortunatus attempted to assassinate his cousin and rival Ernest Frederick, Margrave of Baden-Durlach, who proceeded to occupy Baden-Baden. The Margraves of Baden-Durlach would control the margraviate from 1594 to 1622, when Ferdinand II, Holy Roman Emperor reinstated Edward Fortunatus's son William as Margrave of Baden-Baden. Georg Friedrich, Margrave of Baden-Durlach, rebuilt the Yburg in 1620. The castle was again destroyed in 1689 by French troops participating in the Nine Years' War.

The castle's ruins were partially restored from 1888 to 1913. A restaurant was established within the castle in 1892.

== Architecture ==
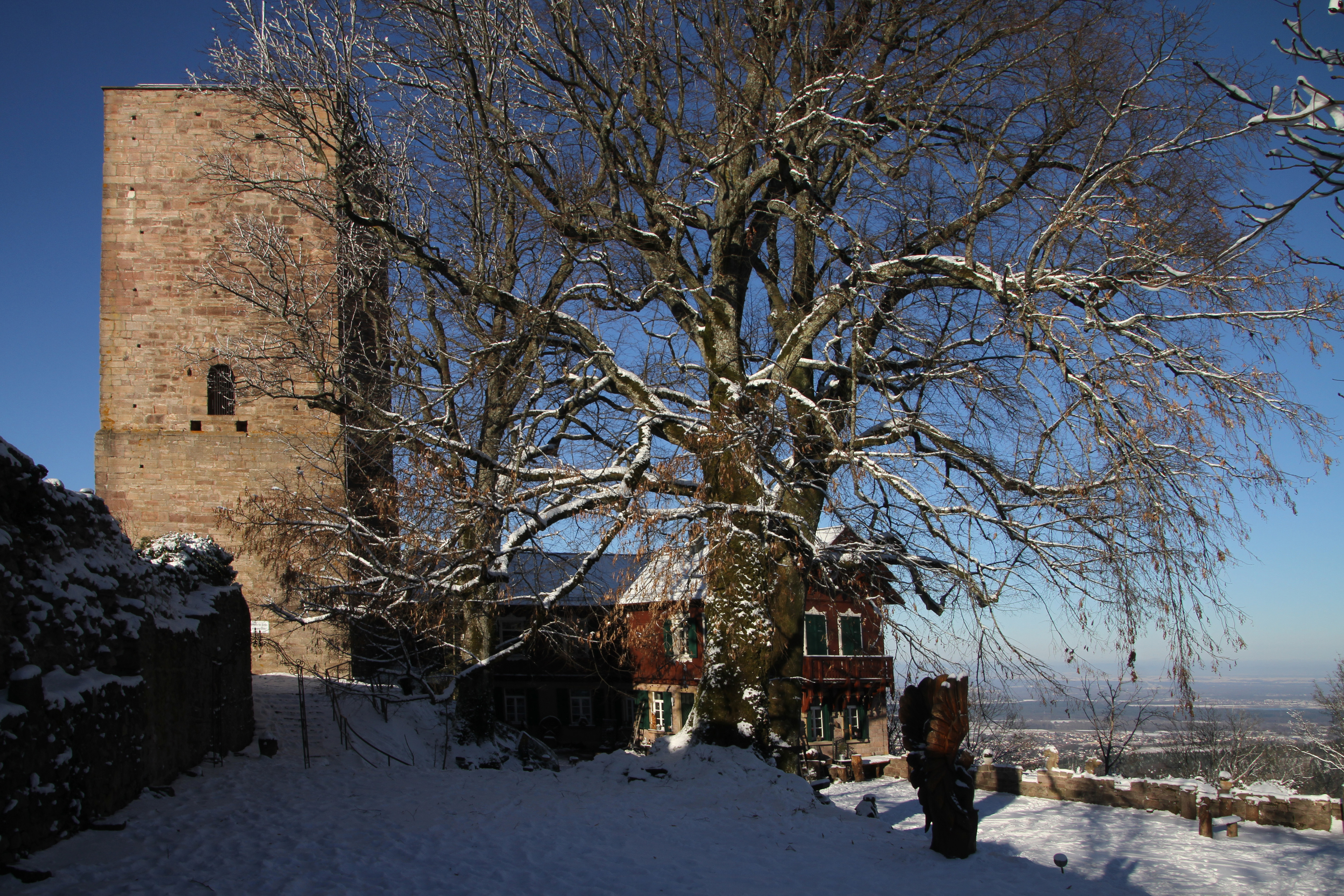
The bergfried and restaurant

The Yburg is made up by the bergfried to the west, built around 1200, and the enceinte to the east, built in the 13th or 14th centuries. An elliptically-shaped curtain wall at the top of the Yberg encloses both portions and is one of the castle's oldest features. The castle was entered through a tower-zwinger. The bergfried stands 20 meters (66 ft) tall and has an entryway 9 meters (30 ft) tall itself. There was a residential building and a keep in the enceinte.

The restaurant at the base of the bergfried was built in the style of a rustic country house.

== See also ==
- List of castles in Baden-Württemberg
