= Steinbach (Baden) =

Coordinates: 48°42′N 8°10′E

Steinbach (German pronunciation: [ˈʃtaɪnbax]) is a town to the North of Bühl in Baden-Württemberg, which is a state in Southwest Germany. In 1972 Steinbach became a suburb of the spa town of Baden-Baden, together with Neuweier and Varnhalt. In 2004, the population of Steinbach was about 5000.

== Geography ==
Steinbach is located at the exit of the valley of the stream named 'Steinbach' (translated Stone Creek), which extends deep into the foothills of the Northern Black Forest mountain range. Steinbach is bordering the Upper Rhine valley.

== Infrastructure ==
Steinbach is about 3 miles or 4.5 kilometers away from the town of Bühl (Baden). It can be reached from Bühl via the Bundesstraße 3 (abbr. B3), which is one of the longest federal highways in Germany, starting in Buxtehude in Northern Germany and ending at the border to Switzerland.

== Economy ==
The foothills of the Black Forest and their high quality soil offer perfect conditions for growing a variety of fruits. Wine is grown in the steep hills facing South. The sun penetrates the dense leaves much better, which results in improved levels of sugar and alcohol, respectively, critical for a good wine. This has elevated the region to one of the top wine growing regions in Germany, with Riesling the predominant grape varieties grown. The village of 'Umweg' is where most of the grapes are grown in Steinbach. The water power of the Steinbach stream was used in the past to drive the turbines of several mills, cereal mills, oil mills, and saw mills.

== History ==
Steinbach was first documented in 1070. At the request of Rudolf I, Margrave of Baden-Baden, on 23 August 1258, King Richard of Cornwall granted Steinbach town rights, marking the beginning of a new phase in its constitutional history. With the granting of town rights, Steinbach also received the right to bear a seal and a coat of arms. The millstone is the sign of the town of Steinbach since the 14th century. The description of the seal reads: "In silver a red millstone with black cone". This was in reference to the importance of the quarries in the parish of Steinbach for the production of millstones for the entire diocese of Strasbourg. The city colors are red and white.

The construction of the city wall was started around that time. The layout of the city covers an area of about one and a half hectares. The city wall was 450 m long. The entrance to the town was protected by two gates, the Bühler Gate and the Badener Gate.

The town was and still is dominated by the castle Yburg.

== Religion ==
The parish church in Steinbach was the mother church for many places in the area, such as Iffezheim, Stollhofen, Sinzheim, Vimbuch, Bühl (Baden), Eisental, Weitenung, Neuweier and Varnhalt. The tympanum of the Romanesque church has been preserved, dating from around the middle of the 12th century. It represents Christ, James, and John. Around 1460, a Gothic church was built on the same site, which was destroyed in 1689 during the War of the Nine Years' War or the Palatine Succession, as it is known in Germany. The choir of the church was preserved and was integrated into the following new building, built around 1700.

The Catholic parish church of St. James is located in the centre of the village, elevated on a hill. Based on the research work of Karl Reinfried, the church was founded during the time of the Christianization of the Upper Rhine Valley in the 8th century. In 1070 there was already a small church, probably built of stone. The churchyard wall surrounding it was probably the oldest fortification in Steinbach, a place of refuge for people in danger. Archaeology has uncovered the foundations of the first church and a tower that was probably built later.

Historic family names of inhabitants from the town of Steinbach have been compiled in a family book from the church registers of St. James from the 17th century. Notable family names were: Rammelmayer, Reinbold, Eckerle, Göring, Oser, Roth, Hurst, Graf, Senn, Wäldele, etc.
