= Fremersberg Tower =

Coordinates: 48°45′10″N 8°12′08″E

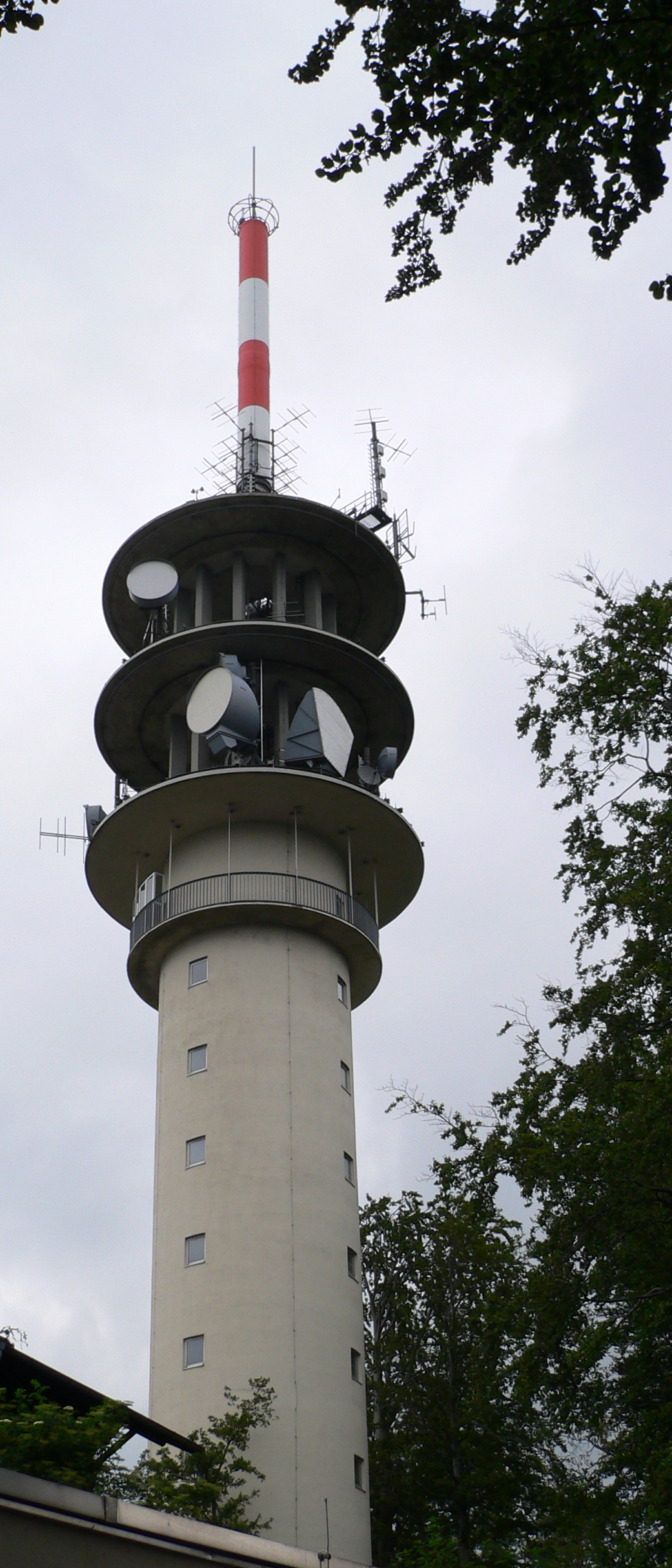
Close view on Fremersberg Tower in summer

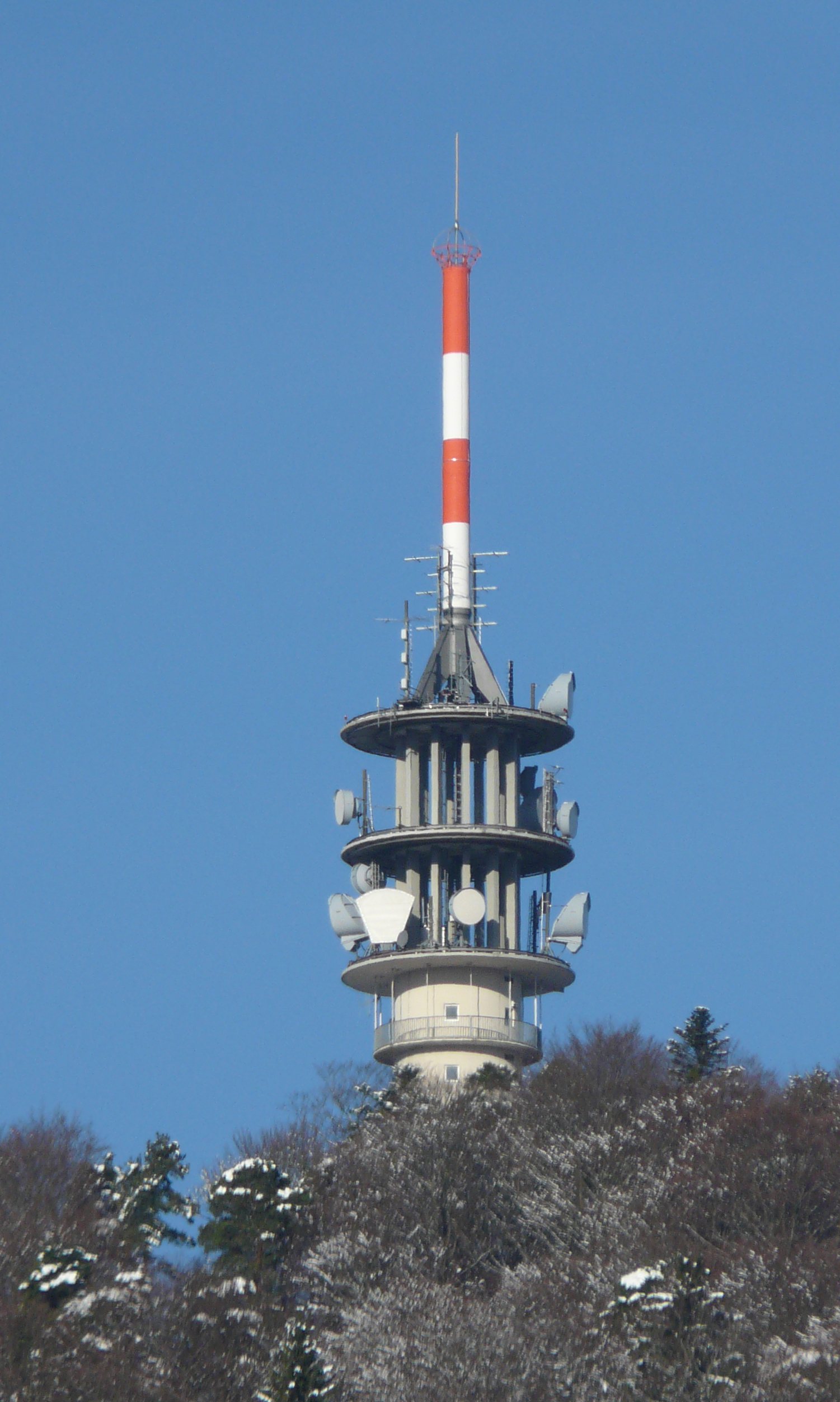
Far view on Fremersberg Tower in winter

Fremersberg Tower (German: Fremersbergturm) is an 83-metre-tall (272 ft) telecommunication tower built of reinforced concrete with an observation deck 30 metres above ground. There is a small restaurant located next to the tower. Fremersberg Tower, which was built in 1961 is situated on 525-metre-high (1,722 ft) Fremersberg near Baden-Baden at 8°12'8" E and 48°45'10" N.

== See also ==
- List of towers
