= Merkur Tower =

Radio and television transmission tower in Germany

Coordinates: 48.76446°N 8.28056°E

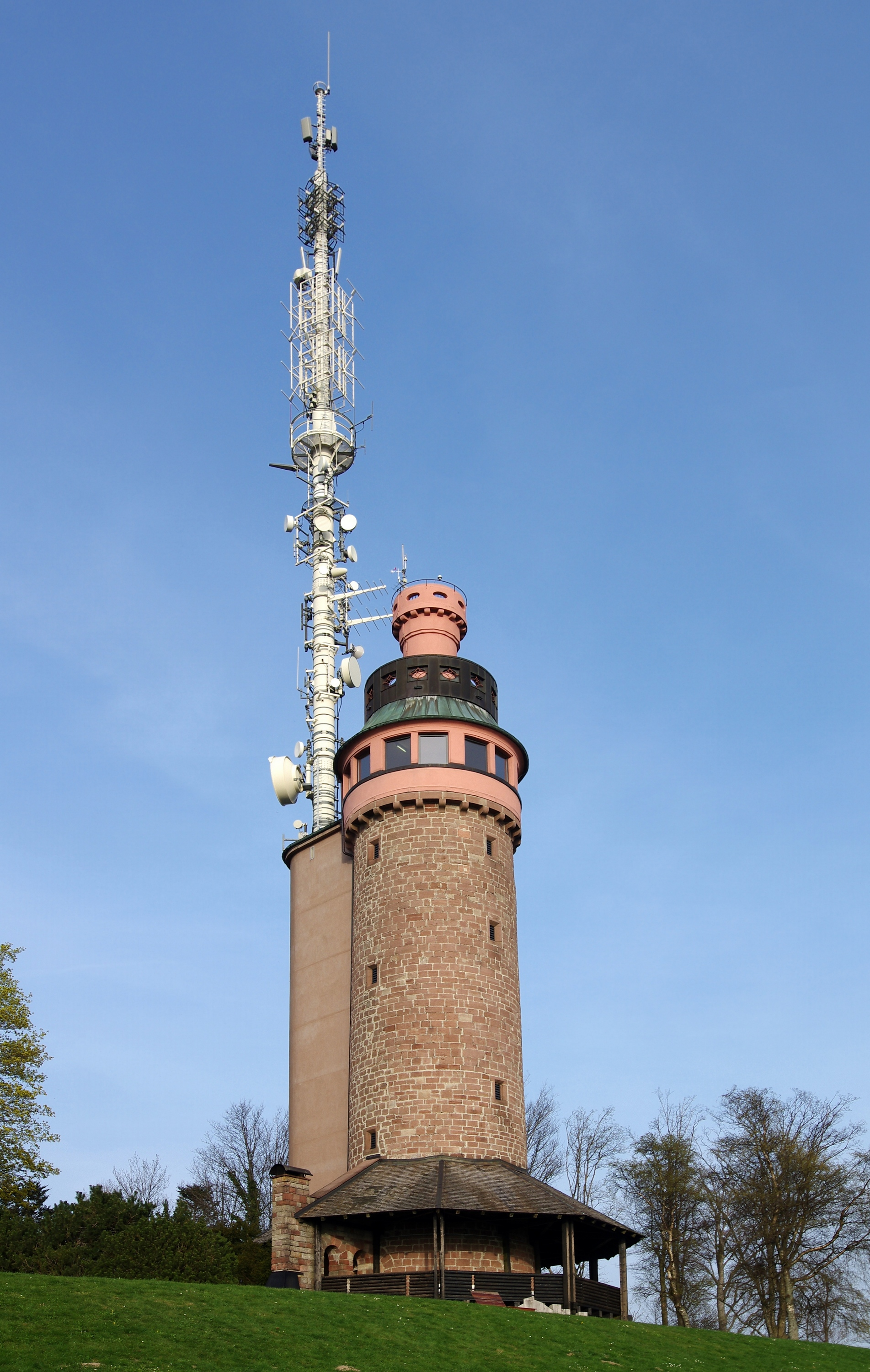

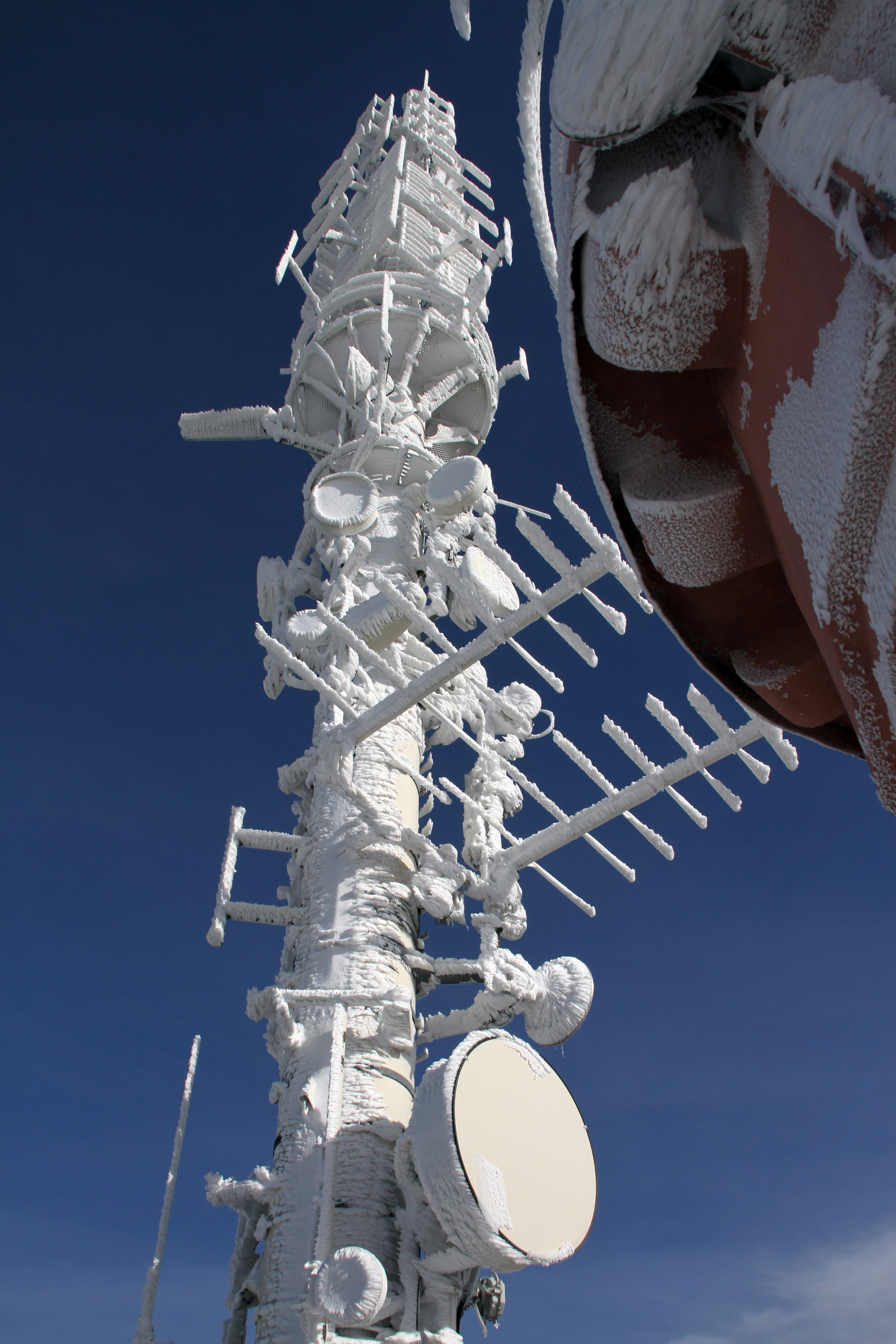
Antenna mast on Merkur Tower

The Merkur Tower (German: Merkur) is an observation tower on the Merkur near Baden-Baden, at 8°16'50" E and 48°45'52" N. The tower has been in use since 8 April 1950 by the former SWF (now SWR) as a transmission tower for FM-radio and, since 1953, television.

At the end of the 1970s the tower was completely renovated and its radio equipment modified. An underground equipment room for radiotechnical equipment was built, and a new tower was constructed, adjoining the older tower. In this tower also an elevator for visitors was installed. Built between autumn 1980 and December 1982, it is twenty three metres high, constructed from steel and concrete, and carrying a forty metre high aerial mast with FM- and TV-aerials on its top.

== See also ==
List of towers
