= Yberg =

Mountain in Germany

Coordinates: 48°43′50″N 8°12′01″E

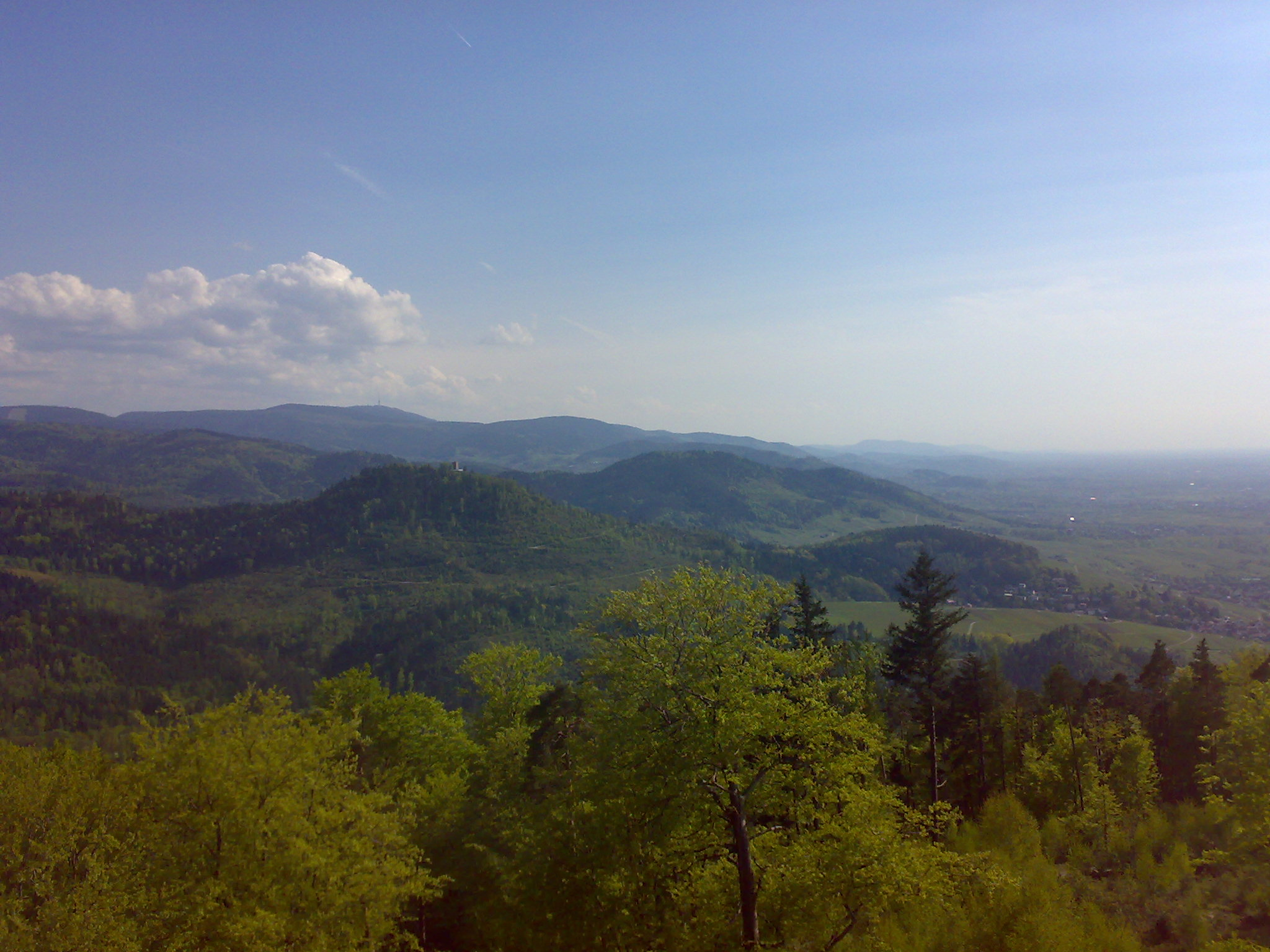
- View from Fremersberg (525.1 m) to the Yberg (center left) with the Hornisgrinde mountain (1164.4 m) in the background in the south.

Highest point
- Elevation: 514.5 m (1,688 ft)

Geography
- Location: Baden-Württemberg, Germany

The Yberg is a mountain of Baden-Württemberg, Germany. Surrounding places include Baden-Baden, Geroldsau, Sinzheim, Steinbach, and Varnhalt.

Yburg Castle is situated at the summit of the mountain.
