= Neuweier =

Coordinates: 48°42′N 8°10′E

Neuweier is a village to the east of the town of Steinbach (Baden) in Southwest Germany. It is located in a valley on both sides of the Steinbach stream extending into the foothills of the Black Forest mountain range. Since 1972, Neuweier has become a suburb of the spa town of Baden-Baden, together with Steinbach (Baden) and Varnhalt. In 2004, the population of Neuweier was about 2000.

== Geography ==
The Steinbach valley is carved deep into the foothills and mountains of the Northern Black Forest.

== Infrastructure ==
Neuweier is about 2 miles away from to the center of the town of Steinbach (Baden). It can be reached locally from Steinbach via the Yburg-Strasse alongside the Steinbach stream, closely following the river bed.

== Economy ==
The hills and their high quality soil offer perfect conditions for growing a variety of fruits. Wine is grown in the steep hills facing South; the sun penetrates the dense leaves much better, which results in improved levels of sugar and alcohol, respectively, critical for a good wine. This has elevated the region to one of the top wine growing regions in Germany, with Riesling the predominant grape varieties grown. The water power of the Steinbach stream was used in the past to drive the turbines of several mills, cereal mills, oil mills, and saw mills.

== History ==
As the name Weier implies the origin of the village (= villa = weier) was an agglomerate of a few individual estates/villas or farmsteads, which were loosely connected. Over the centuries these farmsteads grew together. The village was dominated by the castle Yburg and also by the château of the lords of the manor, the knights 'von Dalberg' and 'von Bach'. Later the château was owned by the noble families of 'Eltz' and the <<Knebel_von_Katzenelnbogen>>'. Historic family names of inhabitants of the village of Neuweier have been compiled in a family book. The winemaker or vintner family names are: Blödt, Dresel, Ernst, Hasel, Hochstuhl, Hörth, Jung, Keller, Lorenz, Meier, Nesselhauf, Oser, Peter, Schmalz, Seiter, Veith, Velten, Weiss. The weaver family names are: Knopf, Himmel.
