= Varnhalt =

Coordinates: 48°44′06″N 8°10′48″E

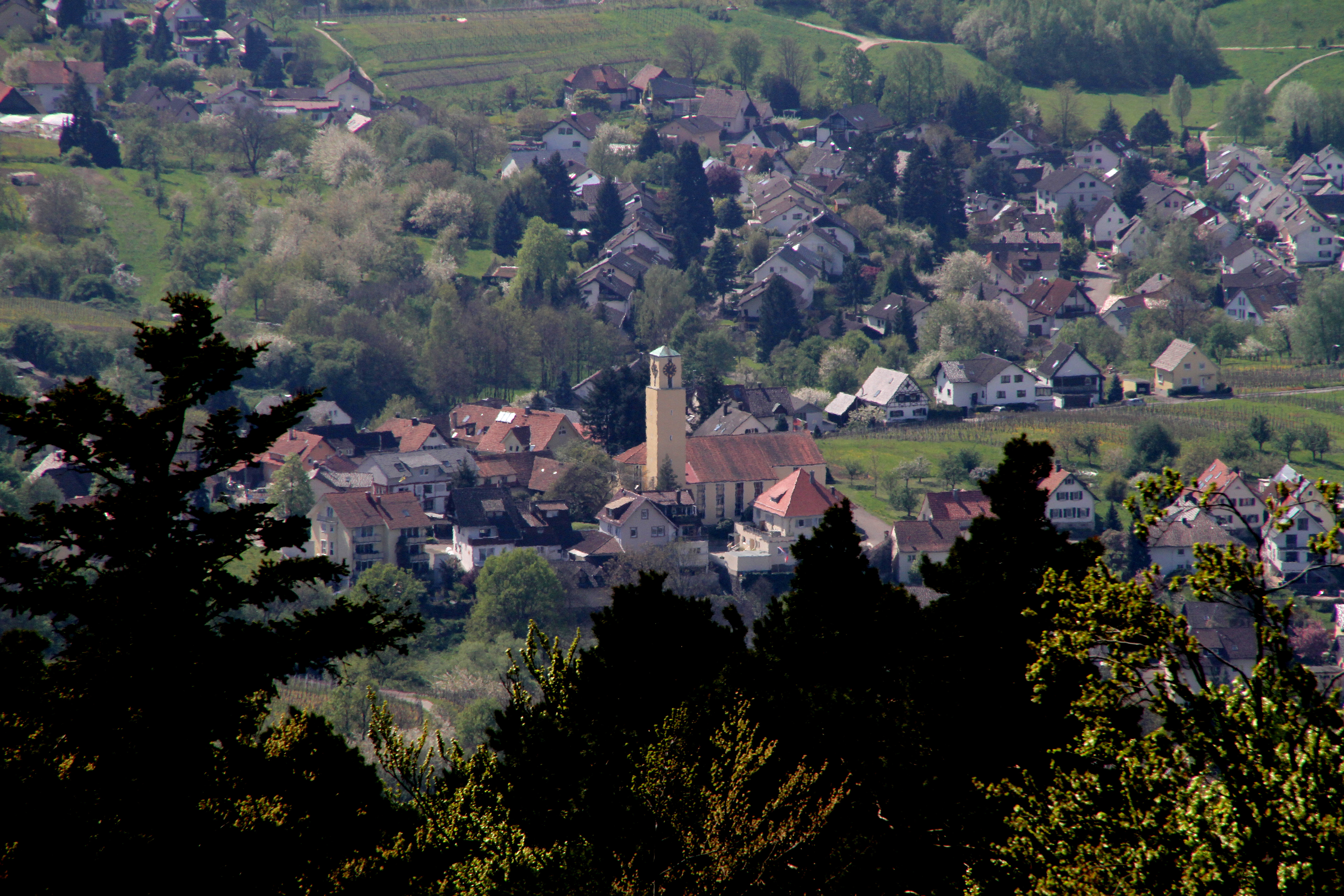

Varnhalt is a village to the north of the town of Steinbach in Baden-Württemberg southwestern Germany. Since 1972, Varnhalt has become a suburb of the spa town of Baden-Baden, together with Steinbach (Baden) and Neuweier. In 2004, the population of Varnhalt was about 2000. Steinbach, Neuweier and Varnhalt formed the joint community "Ortschaft Rebland" and are as such represented in the municipal council of Baden-Baden.

== Geography ==
The location of Varnhalt is carved deep into the foothills and mountains of the Northern Black Forest. Varnhalt is about 2 miles away from the center of the town of Steinbach (Baden). It can be reached locally from Steinbach via the Gallenbacher-Strasse. The center of the village is situated at an altitude of 204 meters on the western slope of mount Yberg (517 m).

== Economy ==
Viticulture and the wine trade are the main sources of income of its inhabitants. The hills and their high quality soil offer perfect conditions for growing a variety of fruits. Wine is grown in the steep hills facing South; the sun penetrates the dense leaves much better, which results in improved levels of sugar and alcohol, respectively, critical for a good wine. This has elevated the region to one of the top wine growing regions in Germany, with Riesling the predominant grape varieties grown.

Coal_Mining was conducted in Varnhalt from 1777 to 1900. The yield was relatively low and it didn't generate enough money to compete with coal mines in other parts of Germany. Mining attracted a limited number of people from near and far seeking employment, which were experienced in the craft of underground mining.

== Religion ==
The Catholic parish church in Steinbach was the mother church for many places in the area, including Varnhalt and Gallenbach. A small chapel was built in 1891. Varnhalt became an independent parish in 1909. The current church building was consecrated in 1958.

== History ==
The name Varnhalt was first mentioned in a document from 1368. As the name Varnhalt and its earlier name or spelling "Fahrenhalt" implies, the origin of the village was as the location where the farmers from Steinbach kept the local bull or Farre or Pharre (from middle-high German phar/var), also known as Fasel-Vieh.

Originally, the village was an agglomerate of a few individual farmsteads, which were loosely connected. Over the centuries these farmsteads grew together to become the village of Varnhalt, together with the farmsteads of the hemlock of Gallenbach and the winery of Nägelsfürst.

The winery Nägelsfürst was first mentioned in 1588 as belonging to the Cistercians nuns abbey in Baden-Baden Lichtenthal.

Gallenbach developed alongside the creek Geroldsbach. It is unclear if there was a creek named Gall or if the name Gall was derived from Gerold.

Historic family names of inhabitants of the village of Varnhalt have been compiled in a family book. The winemaker or vintner family names are: Benz/Binz, Bilger, Dresel, Eckstein, Ernst, Frank, Hagenunger, Hochstuhl, Huck, Greis/Kreis, Liebich, Lörch/Lerch, Lorenz, Mast, Maier, Reiss, Schmalz, Werner/Wörner, Zäpfel, and Zwingert. The names of the coal miners Golaschek, Balzer and Schwendemann appeared in the 1800 in Varnhalt.

== Photo gallery ==
Baden-Baden-Varnhalt

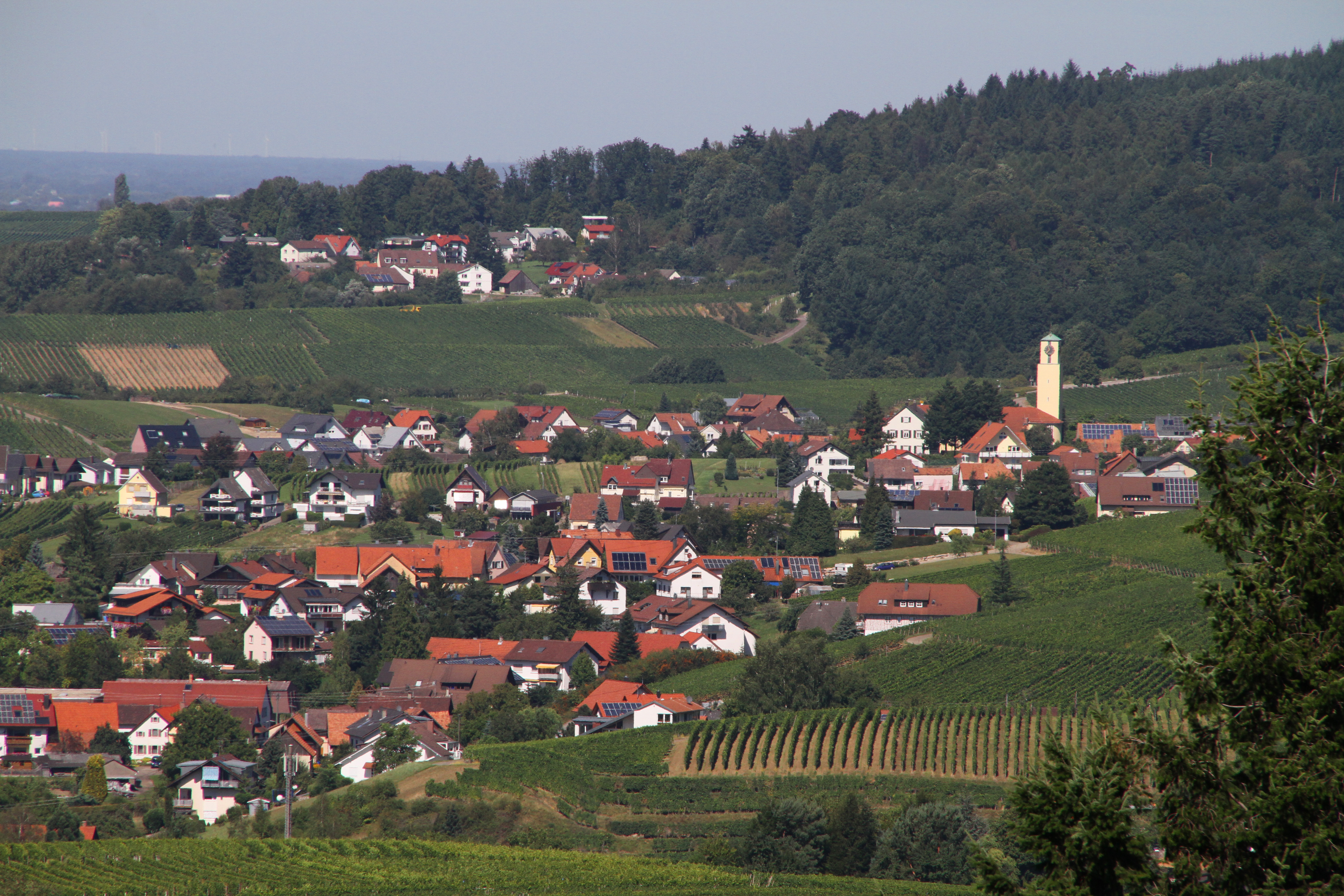

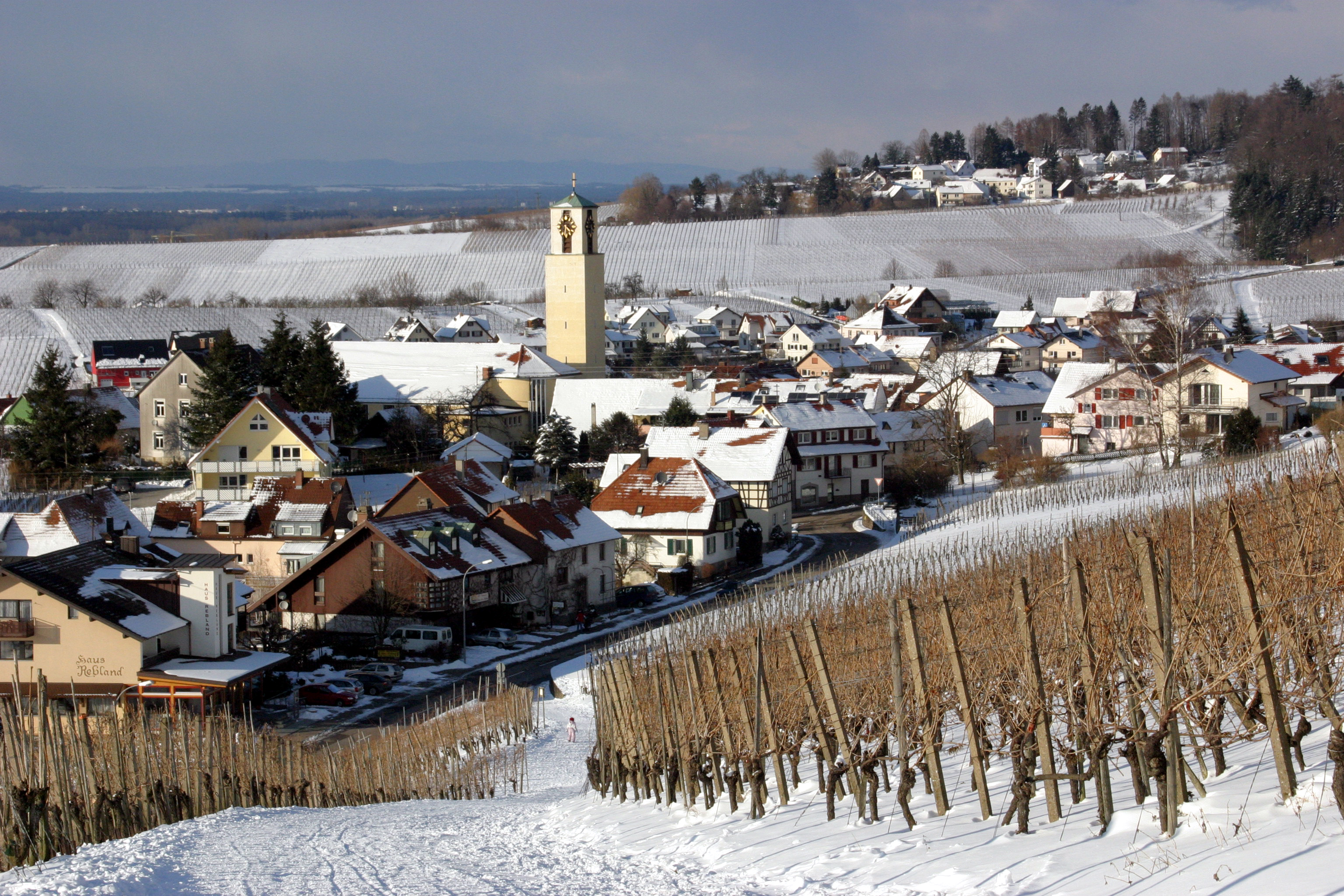

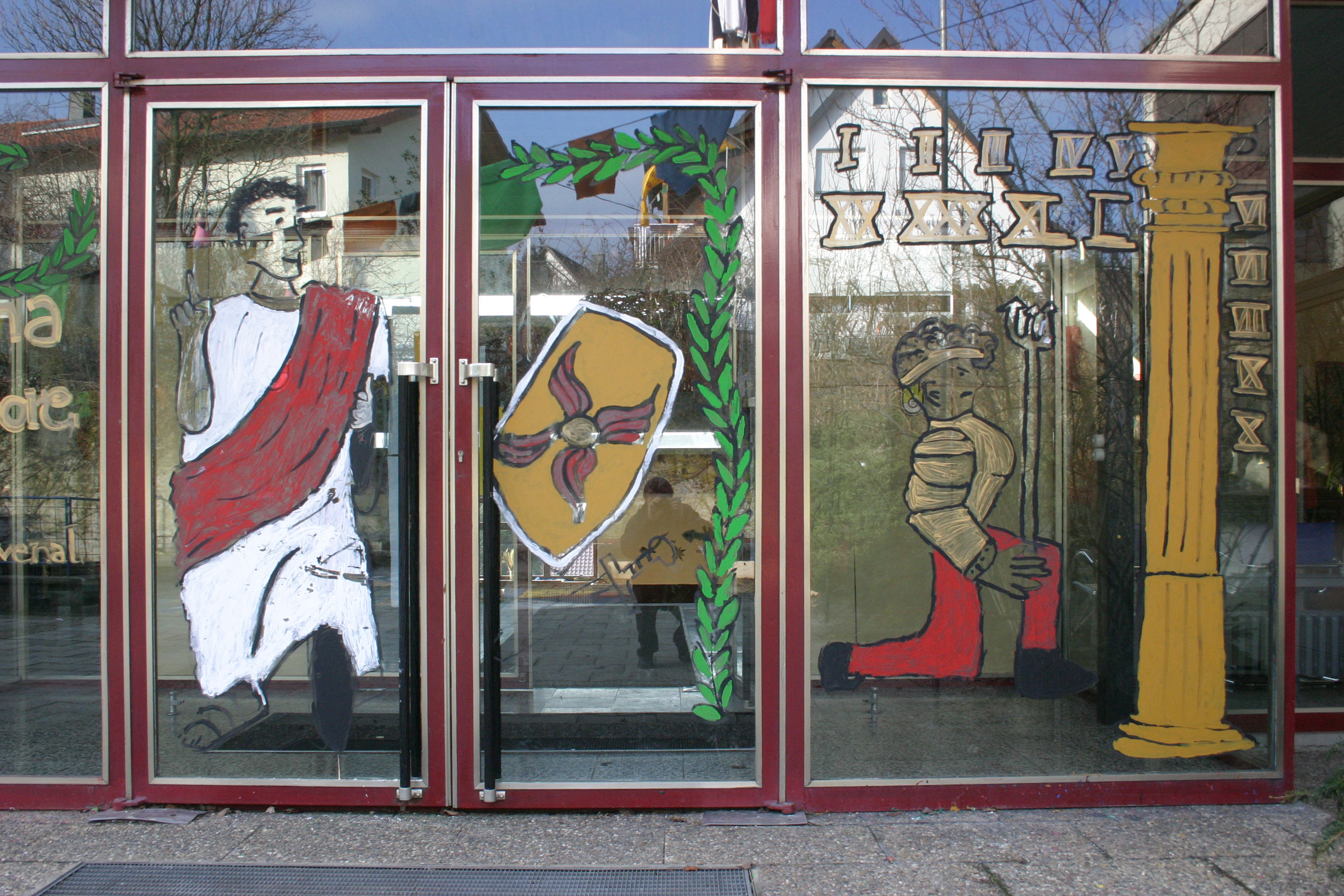

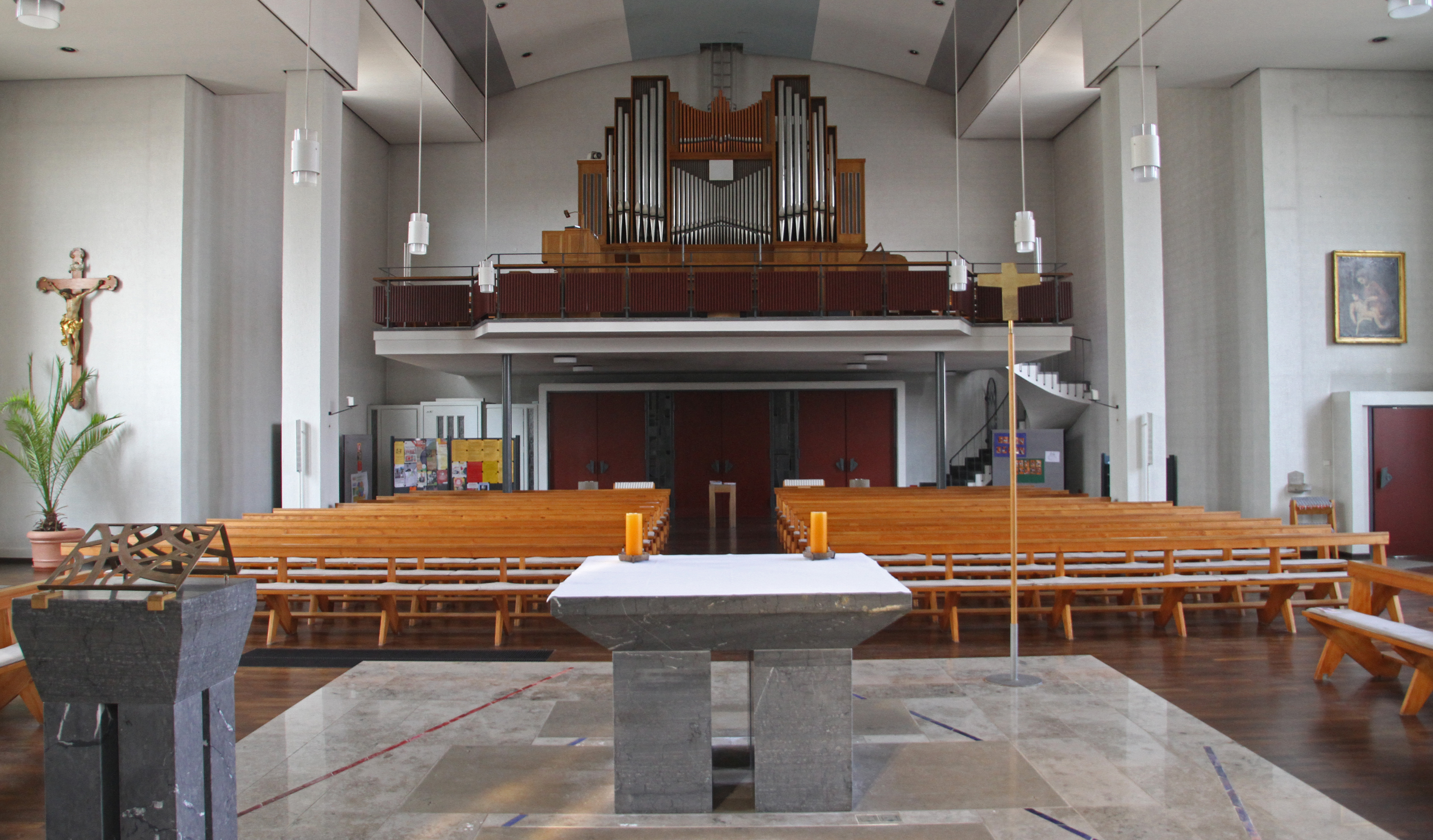

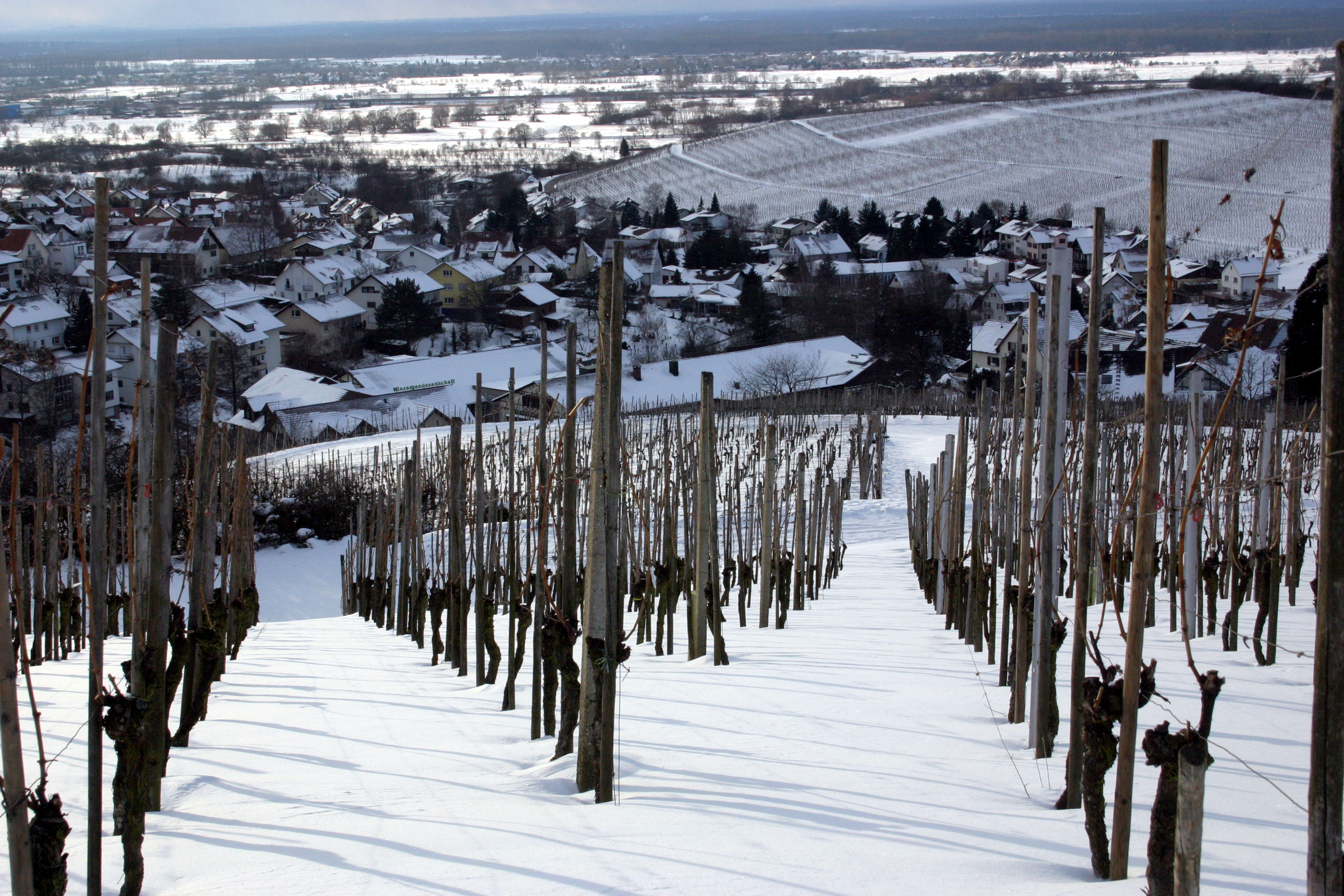

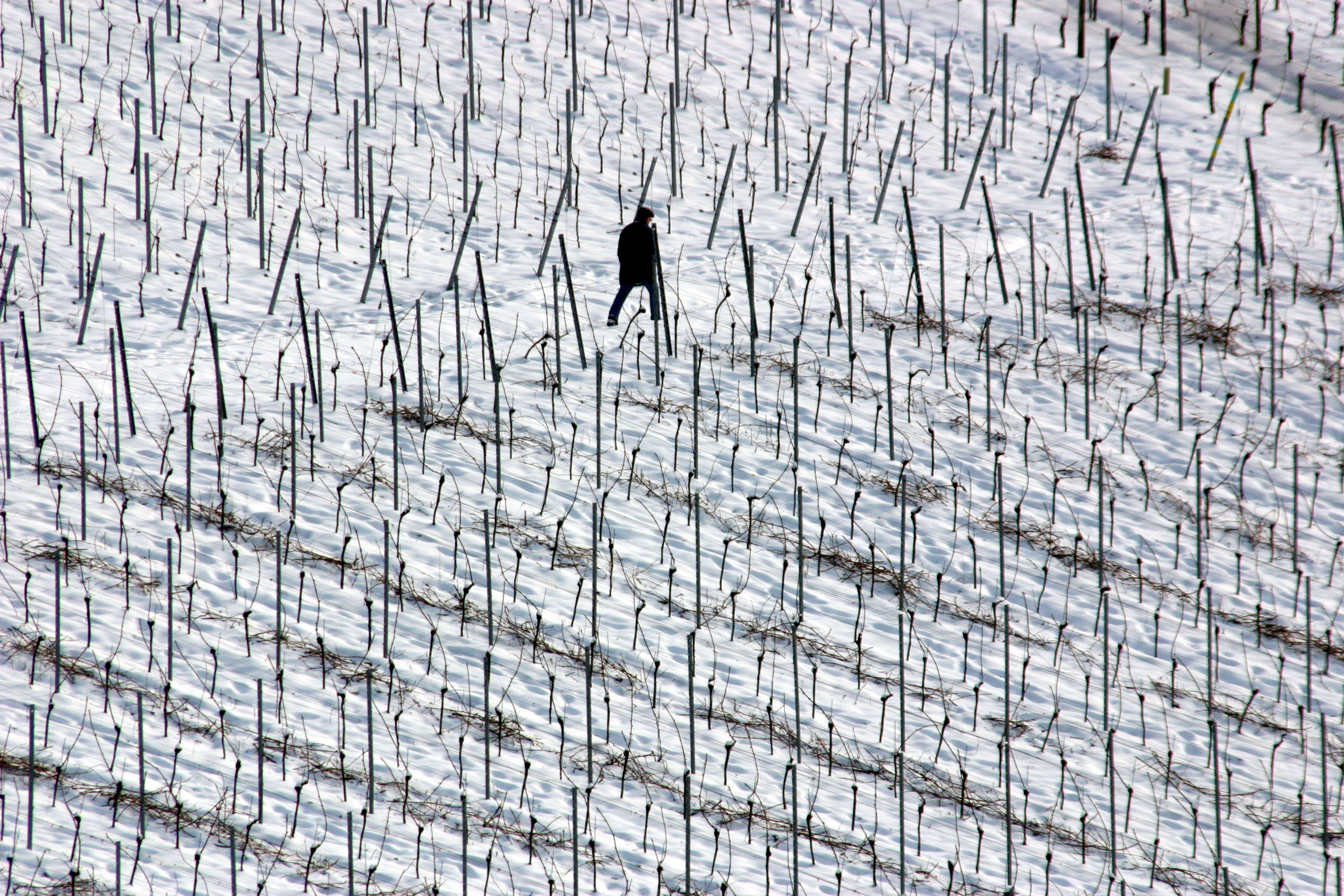

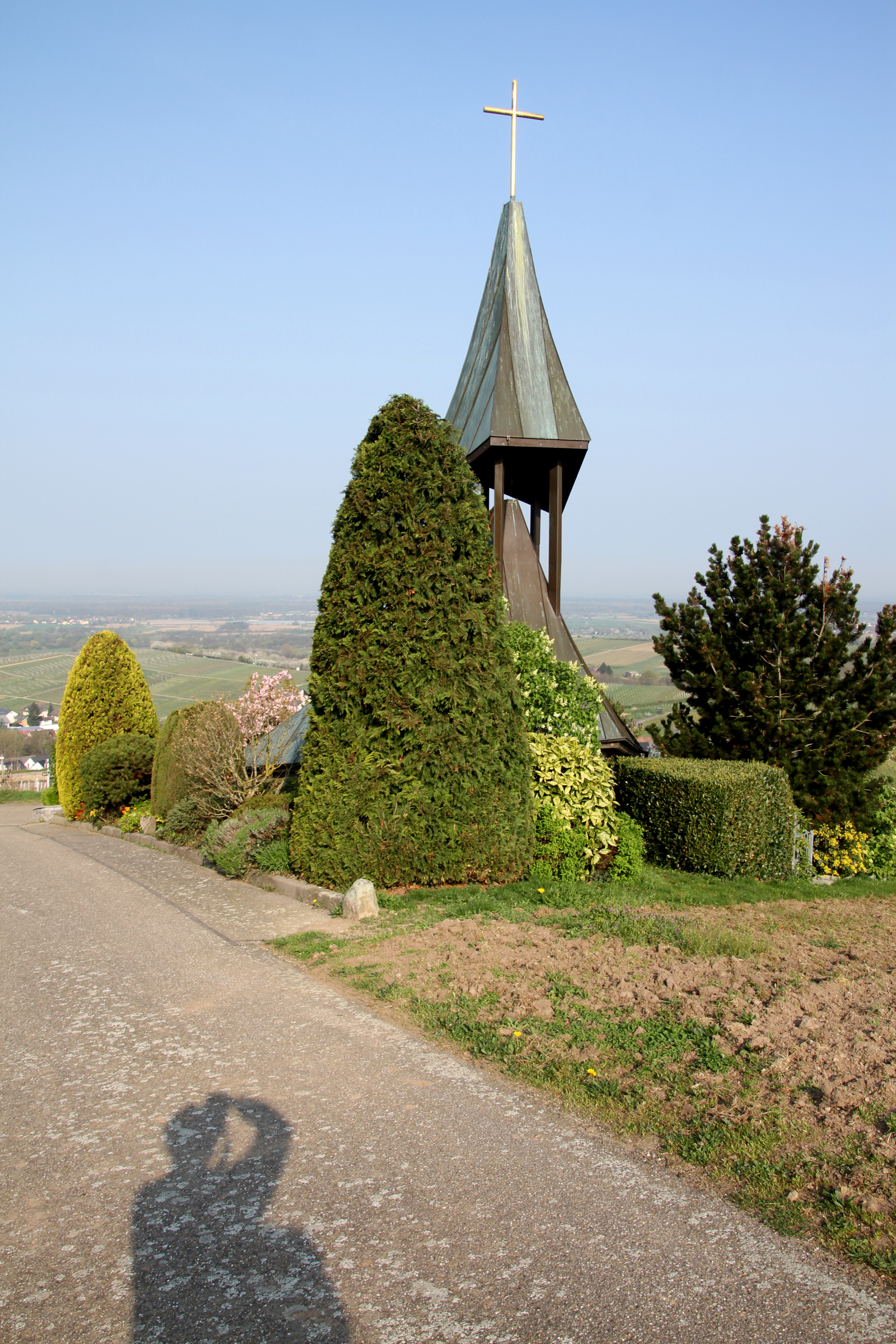

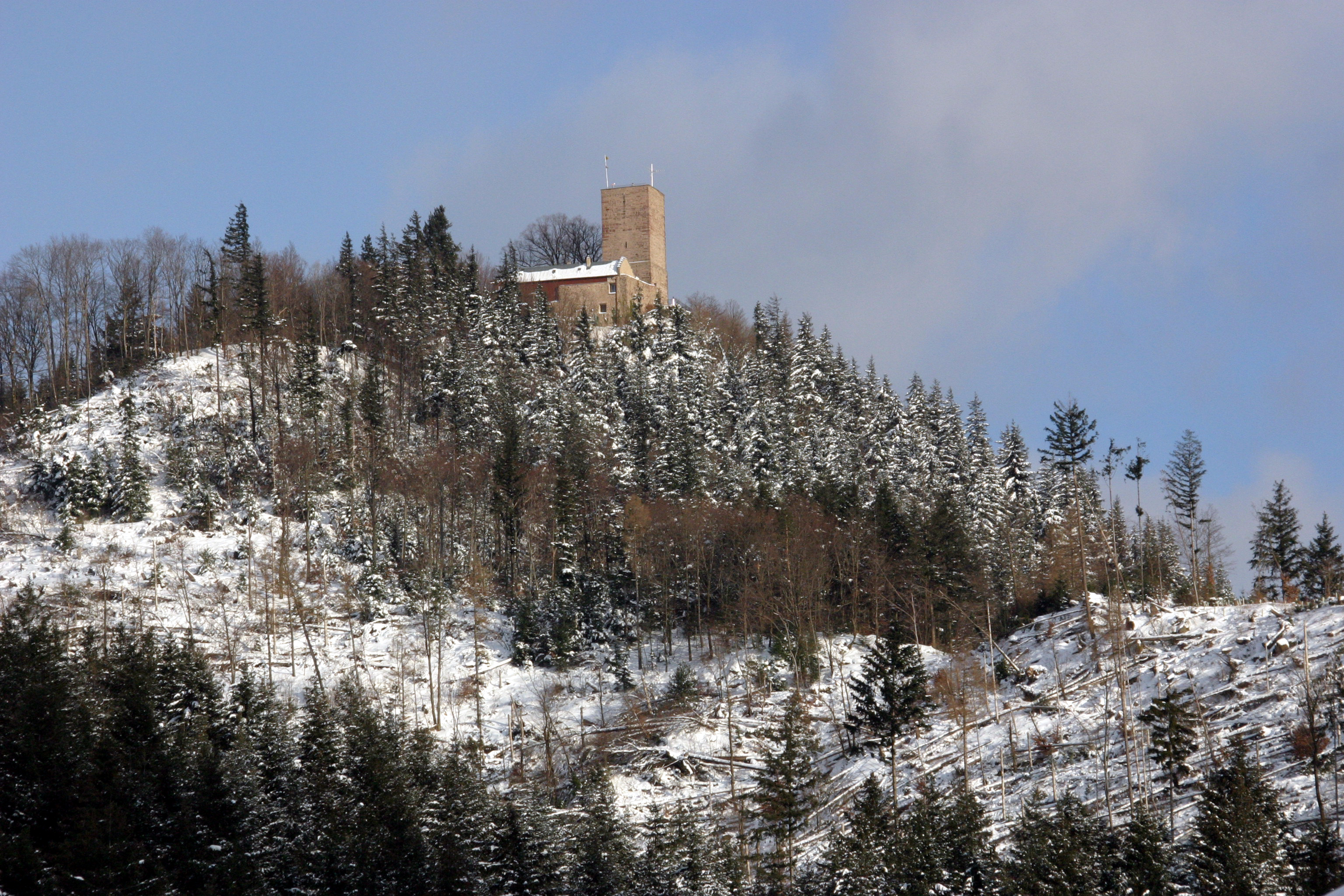
