= Baden =

Historical territory in South Germany and North Switzerland

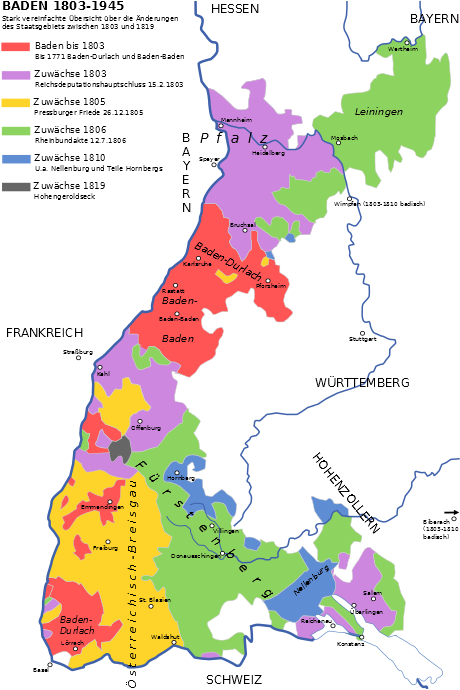
Grand Duchy of Baden with the Margraviate (red) and gains after 1803

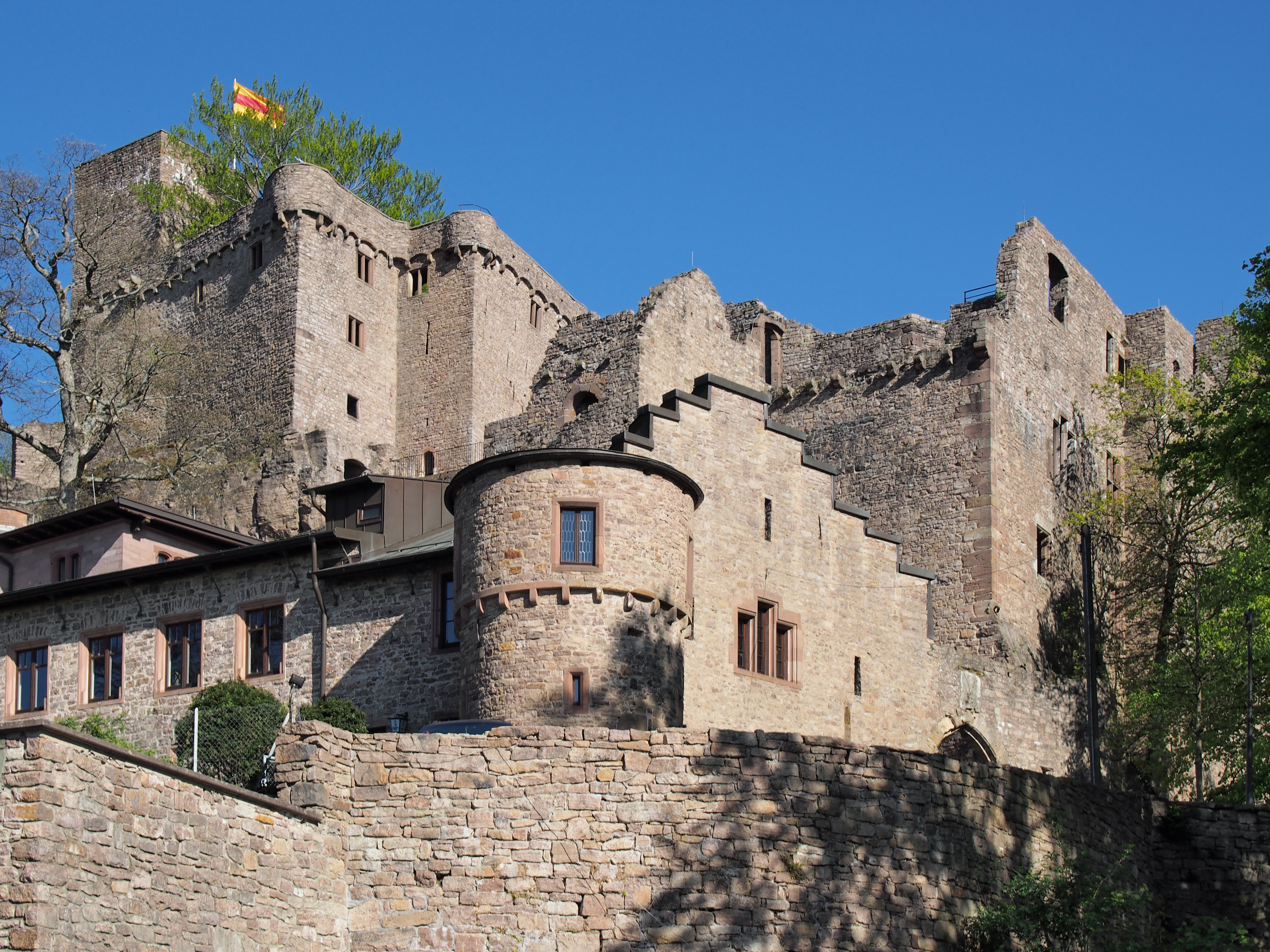
Hohenbaden Castle on the Battert above Baden-Baden

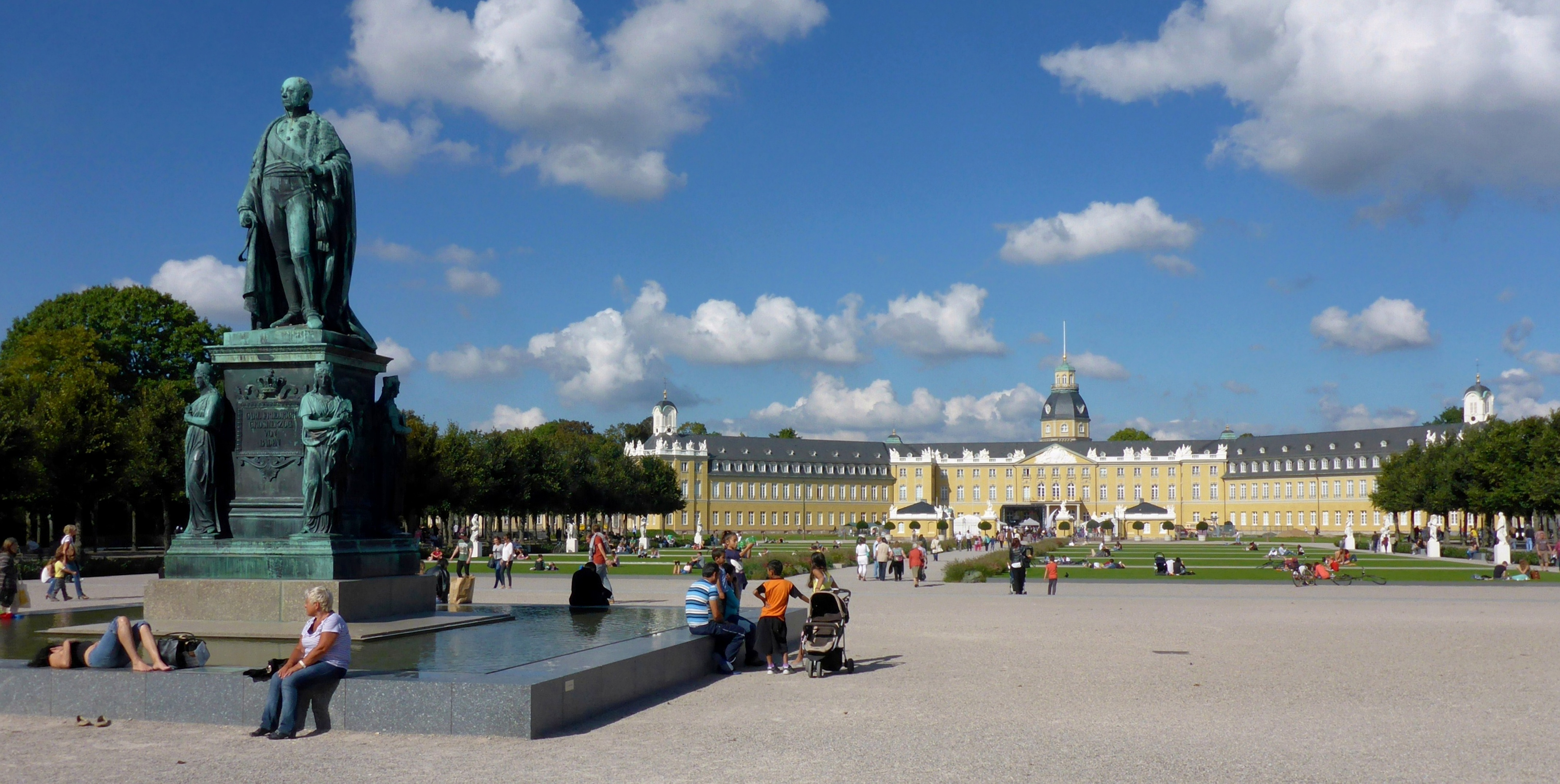
Monument to Charles Frederick, Grand Duke of Baden in front of Karlsruhe Palace

Baden (/ˈbɑːdən/; German: [ˈbaːdn̩]) is a historical territory in southwestern Germany. In earlier times, it was considered to be on both sides of the Upper Rhine, but since the Napoleonic Wars, it has been considered only east of the Rhine.

== History ==
The margraves of Baden originated from the House of Zähringen. Baden is named after the margraves' residence, Hohenbaden Castle, in Baden-Baden. Hermann II of Baden first claimed the title of Margrave of Baden in 1112. A united Margraviate of Baden existed from this time until 1535, when it was split into the two Margraviates of Baden-Durlach and Baden-Baden. Following a devastating fire in Baden-Baden in 1689, the capital was moved to Rastatt.

The two parts were reunited in 1771 under Margrave Charles Frederick. The restored margraviate, with its capital at Karlsruhe was elevated to the status of electorate in 1803. In 1806, the Electorate of Baden received territorial additions and became the Grand Duchy of Baden.

The Grand Duchy of Baden, a state within the German Confederation until 1866 and the German Empire until 1918, was succeeded by the Republic of Baden within the Weimar Republic and Nazi Germany. From 1945 to 1952, South Baden and Württemberg-Baden were territories, respectively under French and American occupation. They were united with Württemberg-Hohenzollern to form the modern Federal State of Baden-Württemberg in 1952.

== Geography ==
Baden is in southwestern Germany, and most of its major cities are on the Upper Rhine Plain. Bounded by Lake Constance on the south and by the Rhine on the south and the west, the region stretches from the Linzgau, Lörrach and Freiburg im Breisgau to Karlsruhe and then on to Mannheim, leading to the Main and the Tauber.

To the west lies the French historical region of Alsace, to the south Switzerland, to the northwest the Palatinate, to the north Hesse and to the northeast part of Bavaria. Its eastern border with the region of Württemberg runs from the Kraichgau through the Black Forest, and from some parts of the forest to the Rhine, distances become as low as 18 kilometres (11 mi) in the so-called Wespentaille, near Gaggenau.

== See also ==
- History of Baden-Württemberg
- List of states in the Holy Roman Empire
