= Toni Kinshofer =

Toni Kinshofer (16 February 1934 – 24 October 1964) was a German mountaineer.

In 1961, on an expedition led by Toni Hiebeler, he undertook the first winter ascent of the Eiger North Face with Walter Almberger and Anderl Mannhardt. At 27, Kinshofer was the senior climber of the team (with Mannhardt the youngest at 21). Kinshofer did most of the leading throughout their epic, six-day (6–12 March) climb.

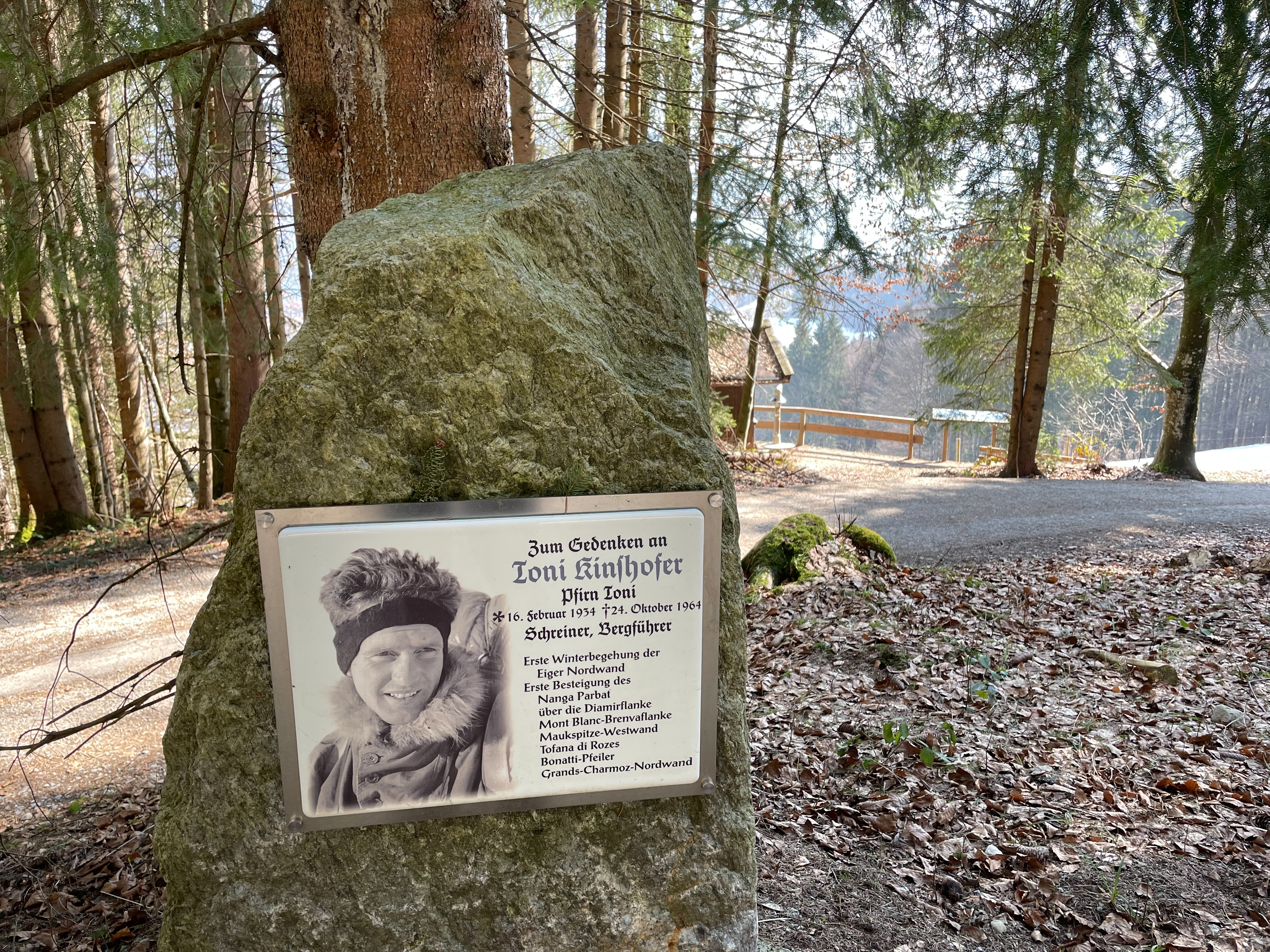
Toni Kinshofer memorial, Prinzenruh viewpoint near Bad Wiessee

On 23 June 1962 Kinshofer was one of three climbers on the German team to reach the summit of Nanga Parbat in Pakistan, (via the very steep Diamir Face) for its second ascent, with Siegi Löw and Anderl Mannhardt. They had to bivy above 8,000 m on the way down. His climbing partner Löw fell to his death on the descent, and Mannhardt and Kinshofer had to have toes and/or feet amputated because of frostbite. The route is named the Kinshofer route and is still a major undertaking.

Kinshofer died in a fall in the climbing area of Battert near Baden-Baden in the Black Forest in 1964.
