= Hohenbaden Castle =

Hillside castle in Germany

- Baden-Baden, Germany
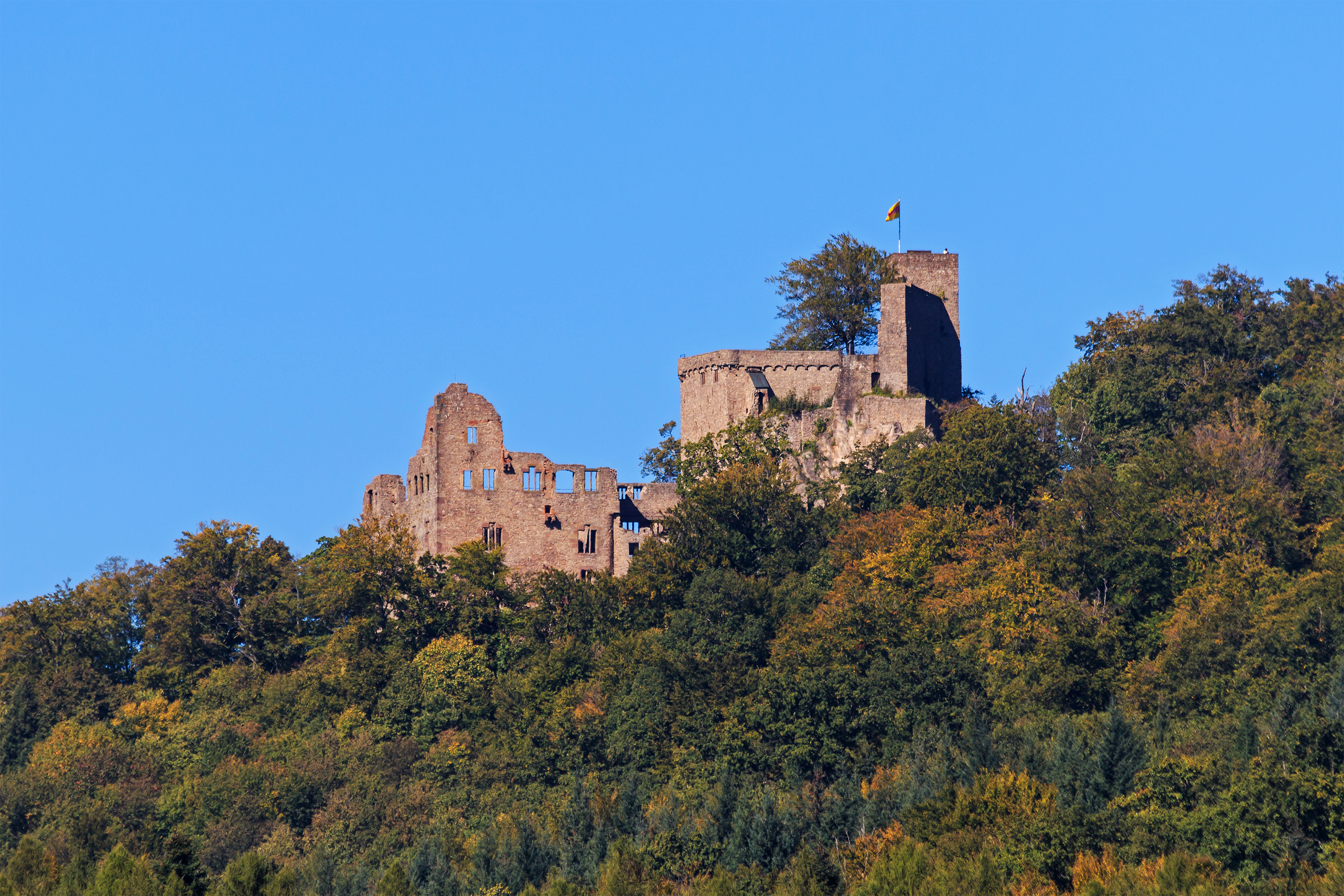
- View on the castle ruins

Site information
- Type: Castle
- Open to the public: Yes
- Condition: Ruin

Location
- The location within Baden-Württemberg Germany Hohenbaden (Germany)
- Coordinates: 48.777°N 8.244°E

Site history
- Built: 1100
- In use: 1100–1599
- Materials: Stone
- Demolished: 1599

Hohenbaden Castle (at the time of its establishment Schloss Hohenbaden, now Old castle or Altes Schloss) in German Baden-Baden was the residence of the margraves of Baden for almost 400 years. The castle was built around 1100 by Herman II, Margrave of Baden (1074–1130) on the west flank of the Battert rock.

Under Margrave Bernard I (1372–1431) the Gothic lower castle was built. This was expanded again by Jacob, Margrave from 1431 to 1453. At its peak, the castle had a hundred rooms. Christopher I built the New castle in the town of Baden itself and moved there in 1479.

The Old castle then served as a widow's residence until it was destroyed by fire in 1599.

Hohenbaden - Altes Schloss Hohenbaden

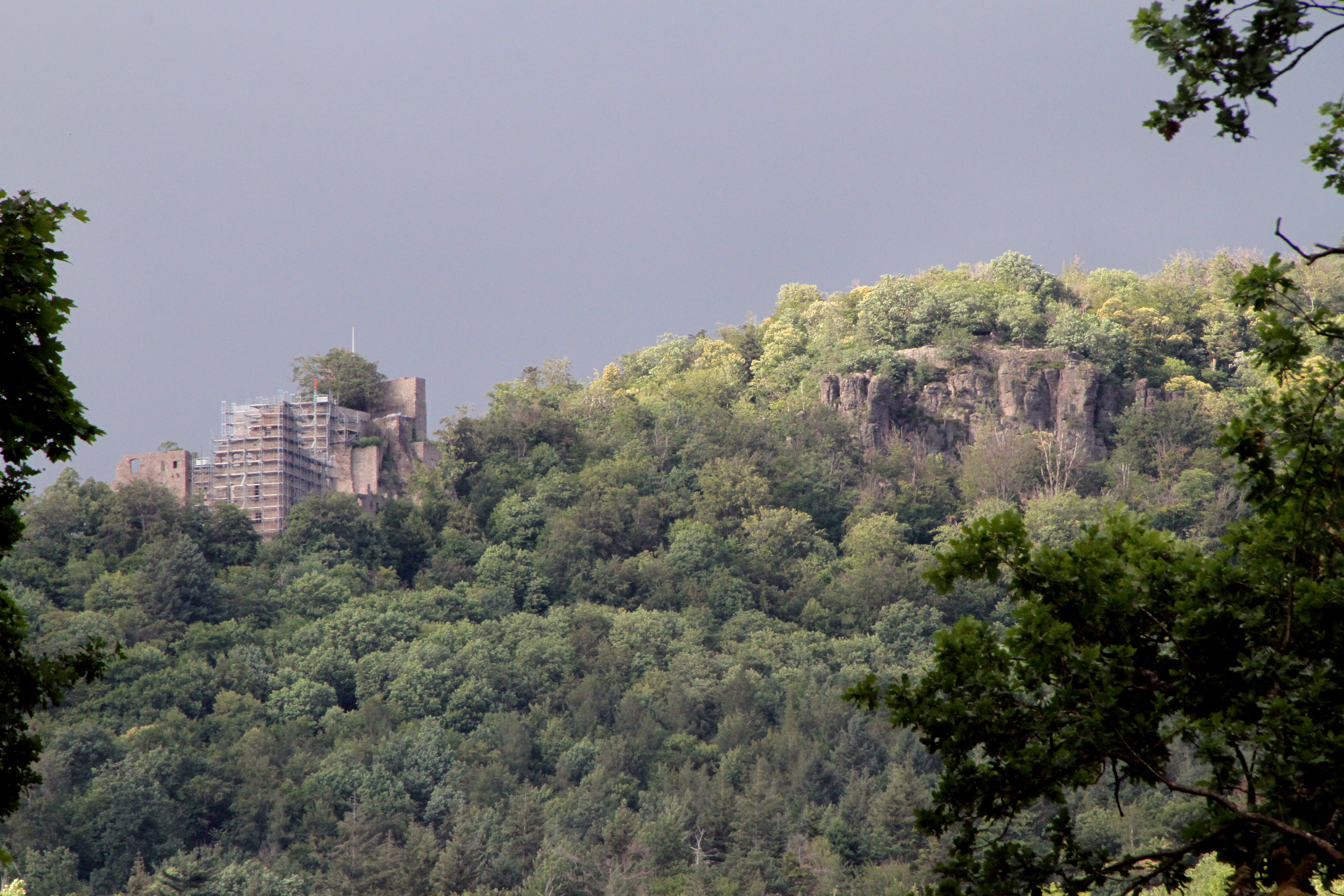

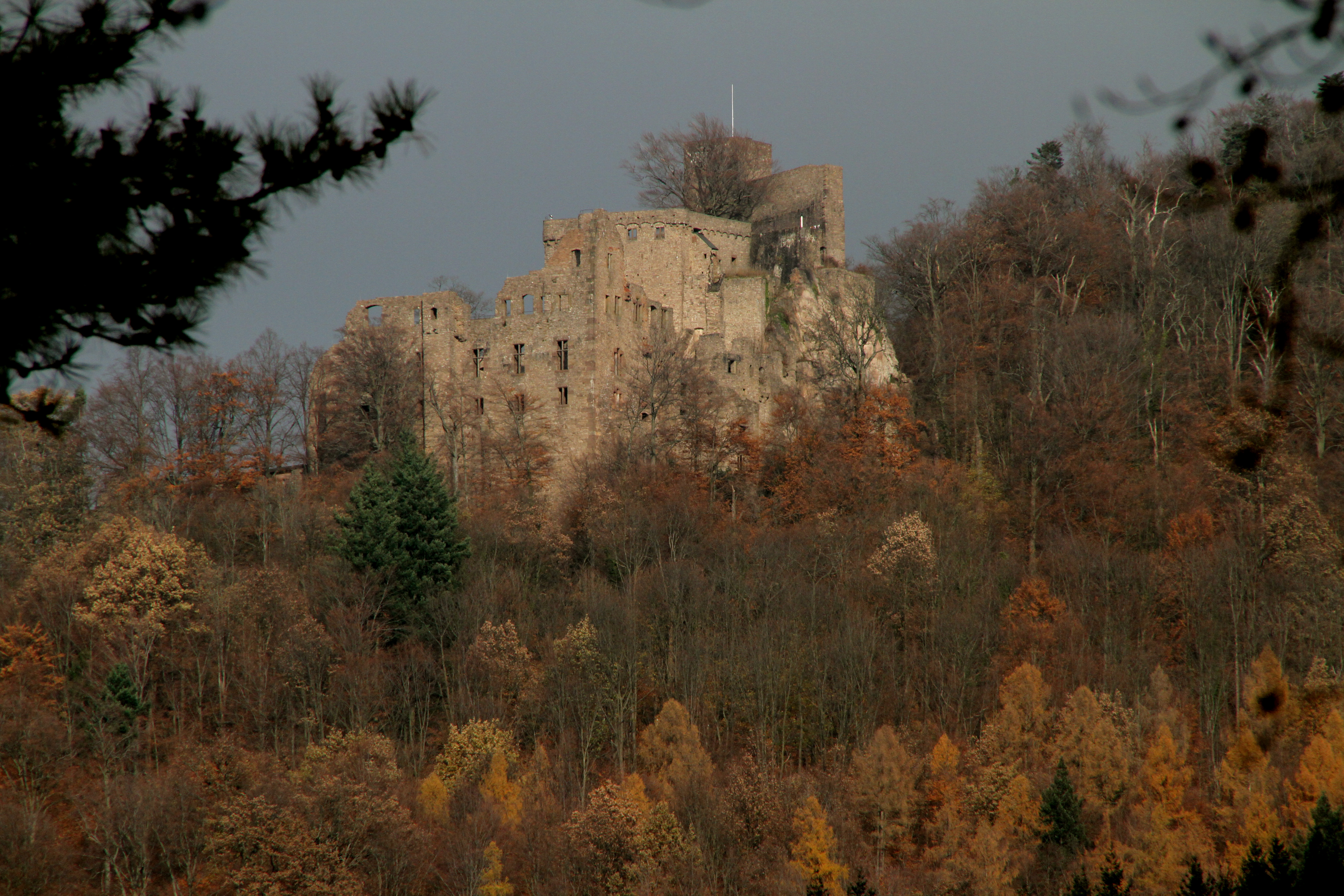

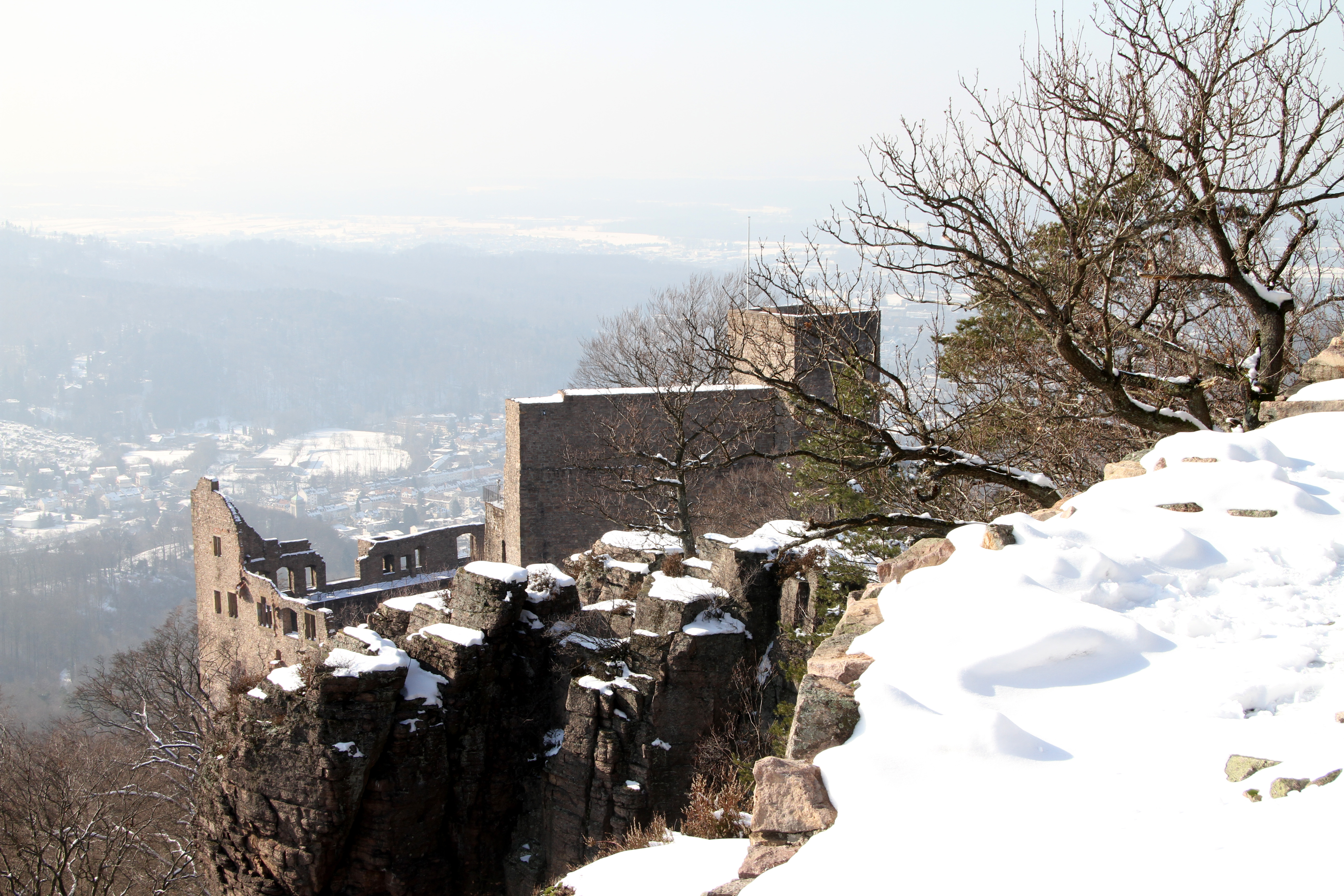

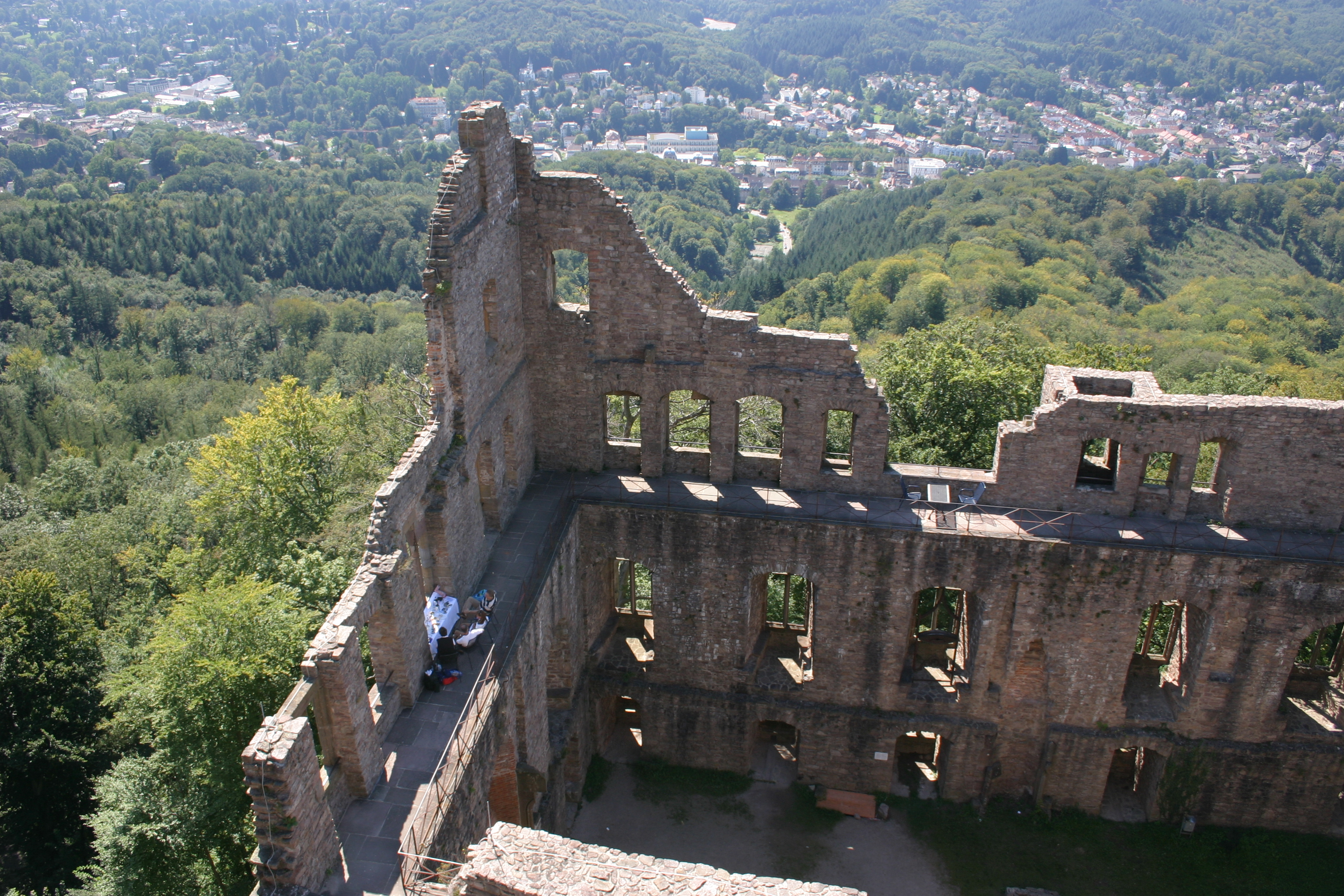

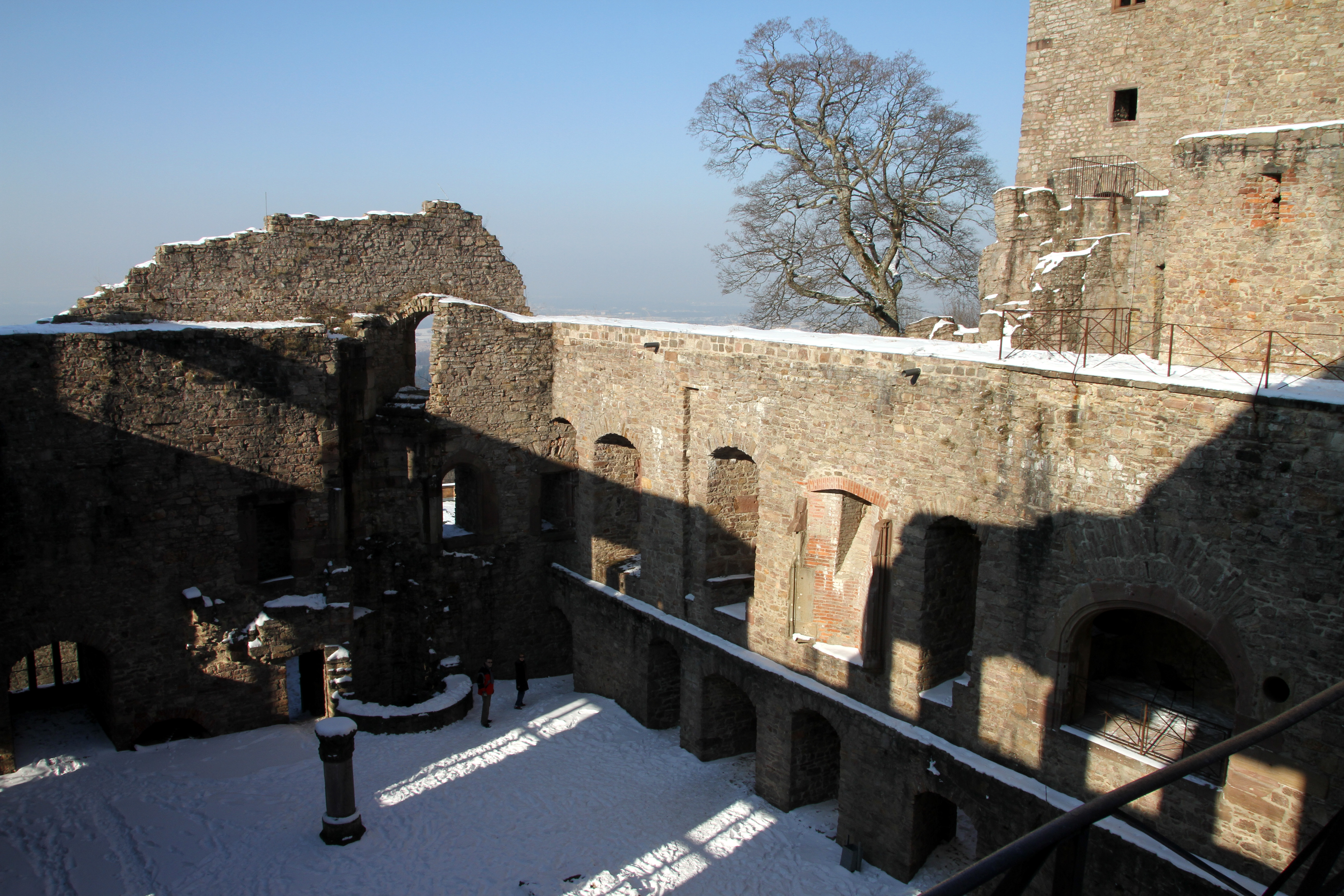

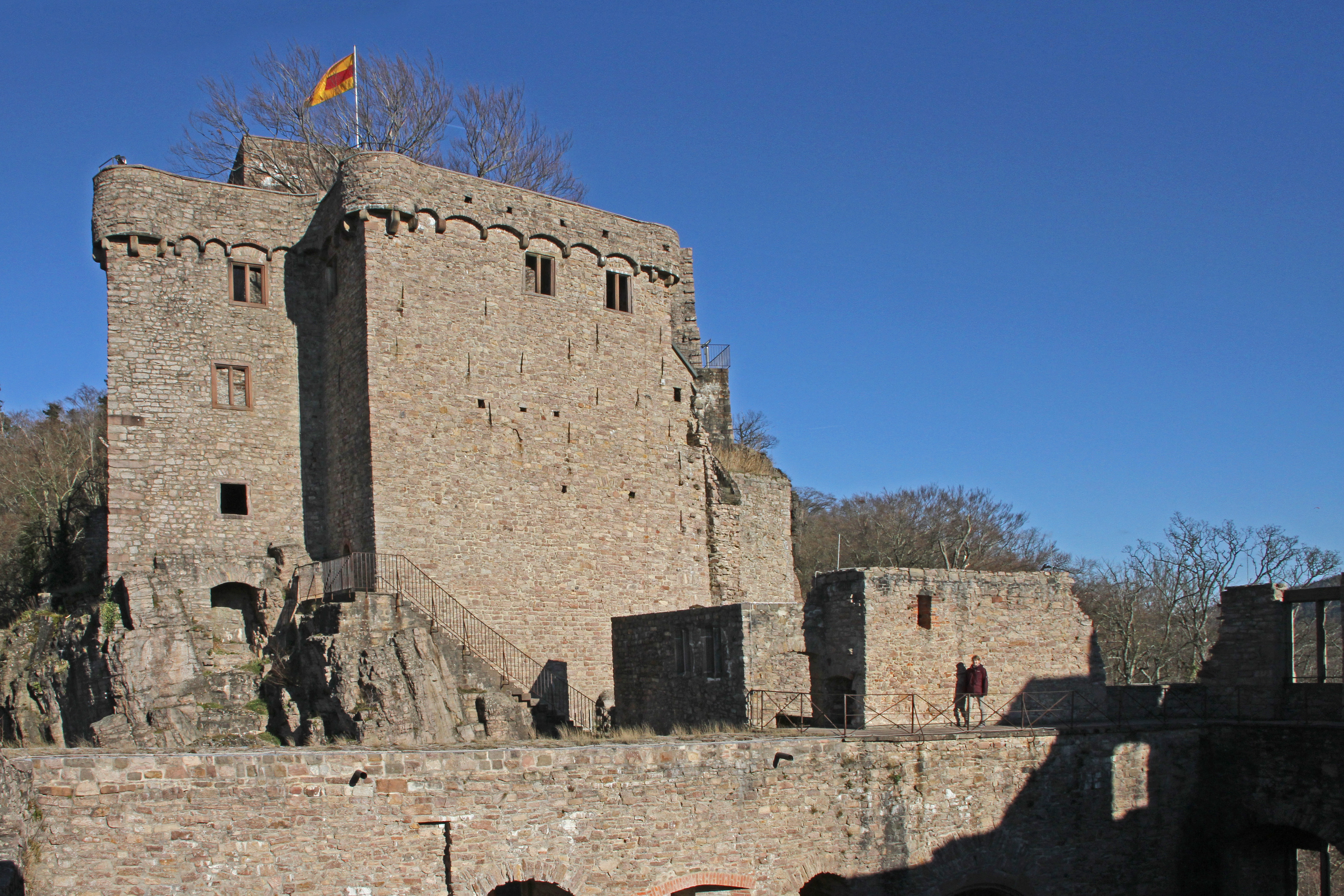

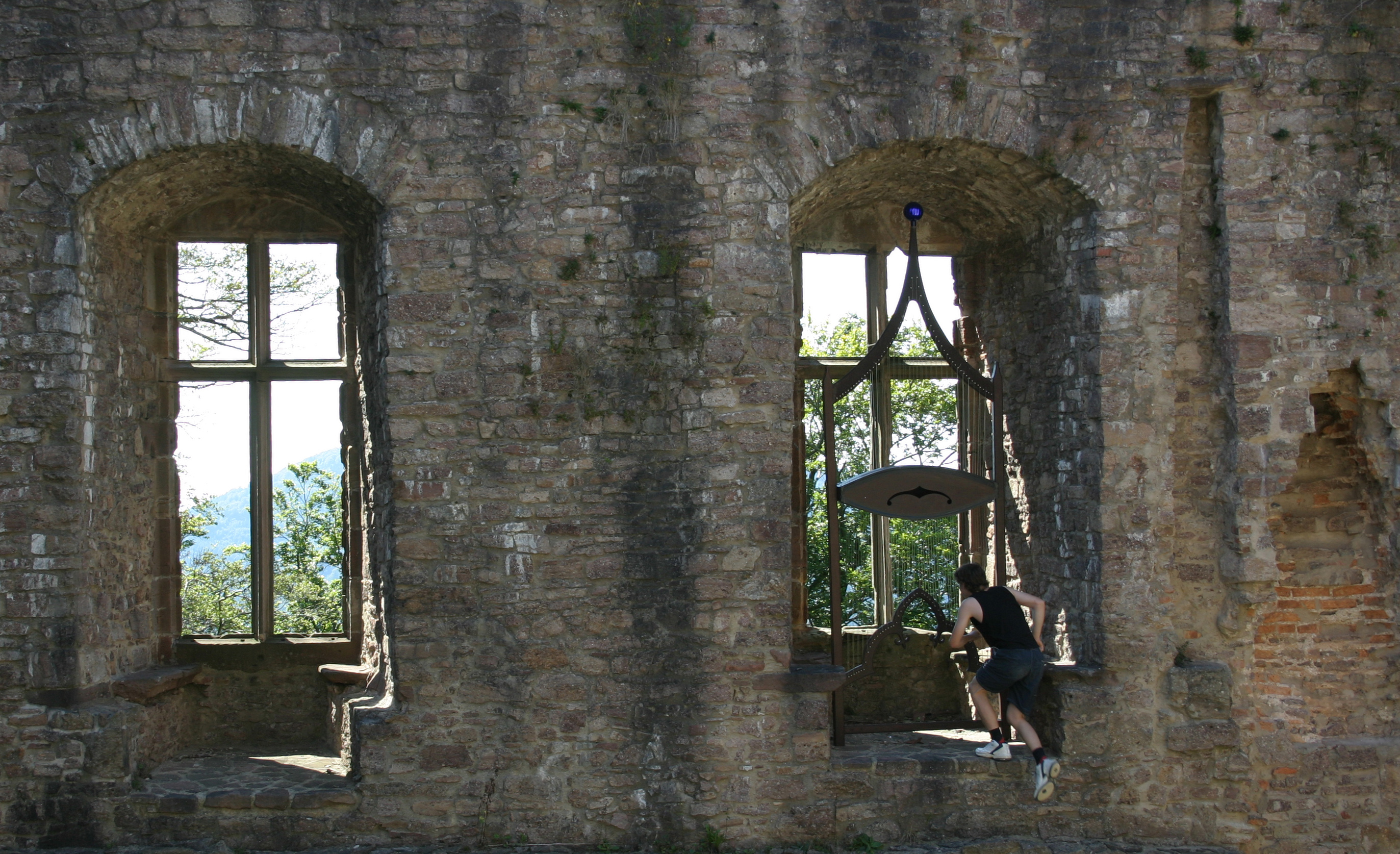

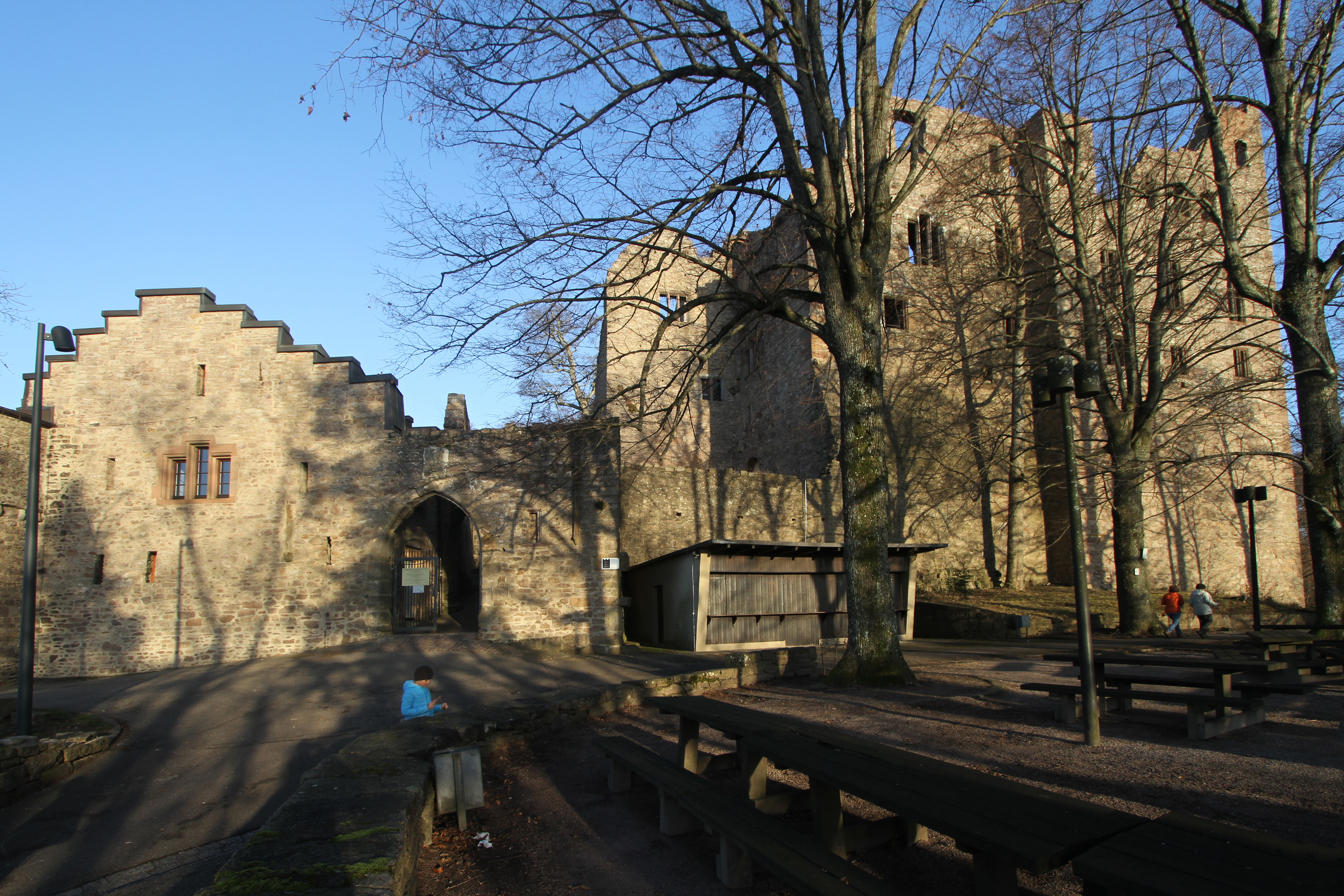

== Sources ==
- ALTES SCHLOSS HOHENBADEN
- Reconstruction
