= Battert =

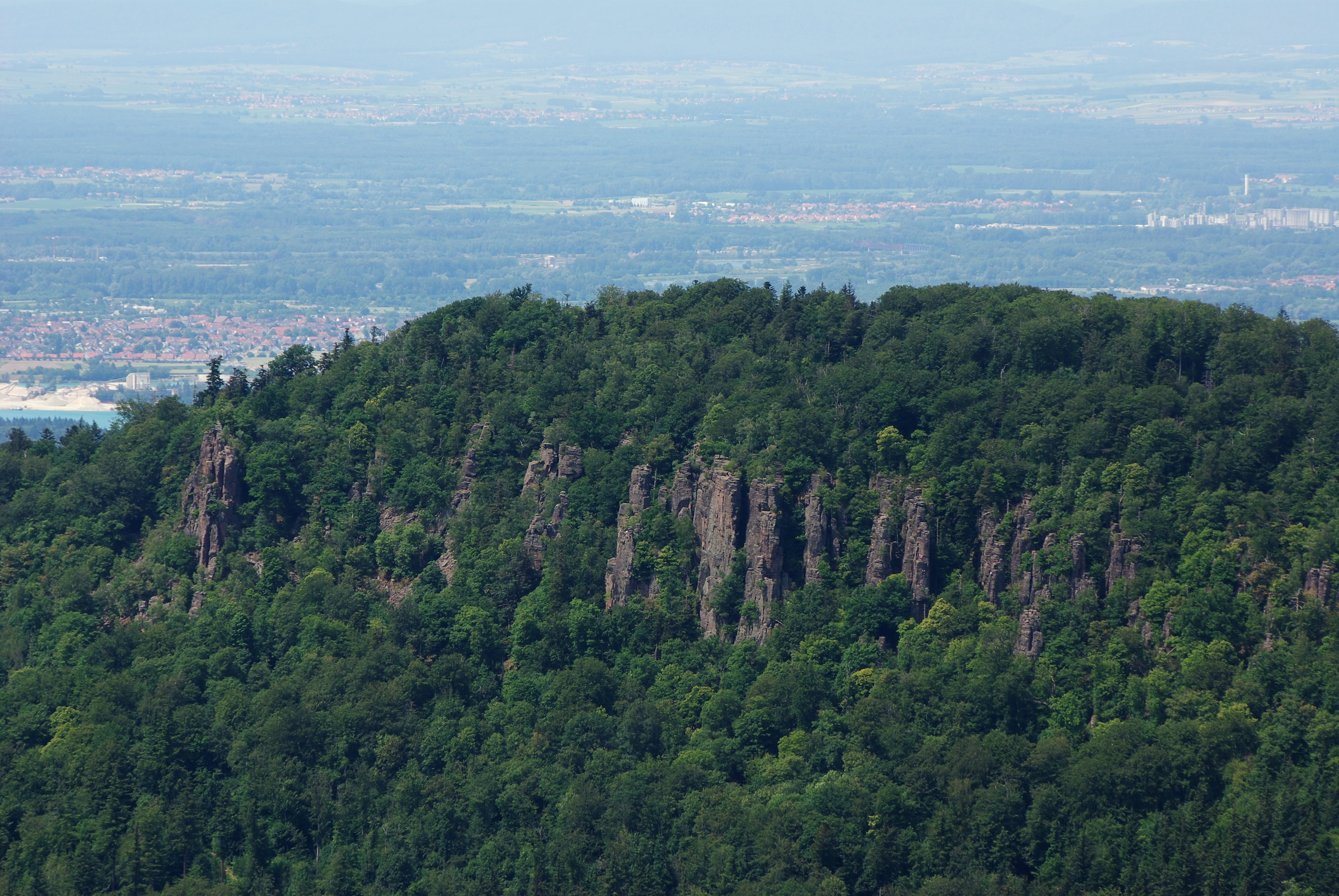
- The Battert as seen from the Merkur

Highest point
- Coordinates: 48°46′44″N 8°15′12″E

Geography
- Location within Baden-Württemberg
- Location: Baden-Baden, Baden-Württemberg, Germany

The Battert is a hill, 567.9 m above sea level (NHN), on the western edge of the Northern Black Forest north of Baden-Baden in Germany. On its western slopes are the ruins of Hohenbaden Castle (the Altes Schloss or "Old Castle"), on the southern side is the climbing area and nature reserve called the Battert Rocks (Battertfelsen). On the hill ridge are the remains of a circular rampart, probably built by Celtic settlers. On the eastern side lies the village of Ebersteinburg.

The Battert is a destination for ramblers and climbers all year round, heading for the 15–60-metre-high Battertfelsen. Above and below the rock face is a footpath around the rocks. The red rock face is visible from far off and may be easily reached on the road to the ruins of Hohenbaden or from a car park near Ebersteinburg.

== Geology ==
Consisting of sediments of Rotliegend, the Battertfelsen were formed about 251-299 million years ago. By contrast with their immediate environment, the rocks of the Battertfelsen silicified due to an east-west oriented fault line. Because of this silicification the rock became more erosion-resistant which is why they now stand out so prominently.

== Nature reserve ==
An area of 34.9 hectares around the Battertfelsen and east of Hohenbaden Castle on the south side of the hill was declared as a nature reserve by the Regierungspräsidium Karlsruhe on 30 June 1981. The reserve is known as Battertfelsen near Hohenbaden Castle (Battertfelsen beim Schloss Hohenbaden). The geologically and earth-historically important rock group is home to rare insects, reptiles, ravens and peregrine falcons and also to rare plant species, especially in the stone run woodland below the rock faces.

== Climbing ==
Thanks to Wilhelm Paulcke the popularity of the Battert as a climbing area grew after he had opened the first climbing routes there in about 1885. Since then a large number of routes with different levels of difficulty have been developed, from grade II to grade IX. On 24 October 1964 Toni Kinshofer, who was the first to climb the Diamir flank of Nanga Parbat and climbed the Eiger north face the year before, fell from the heights of the Battert and died of his injuries shortly after.

=== Climbing routes ===
- Kuhkamin (III), about 1885
- Marterkamin (IV+ to V−), about 1885
- Paulckeweg (III), Wilhelm Paulcke about 1890
- Bockgrat (IV+), first ascent in 1905
- Alter Pforzheimer Weg (IV+), 1925 by Walter Stößer
- Neuer Pforzheimer Weg (VI), by Walter Stößer
- Wespenkante (V), by Walter Stößer
- Neue Falkenwand (VII−), 1945 by Martin Schliessler
- Kühnkante (VI+), Reinhard Karl and Kurt Jägel
- Südostverschneidung (VII−), Martin Schliessler and Kurt Jägel

== Gallery ==
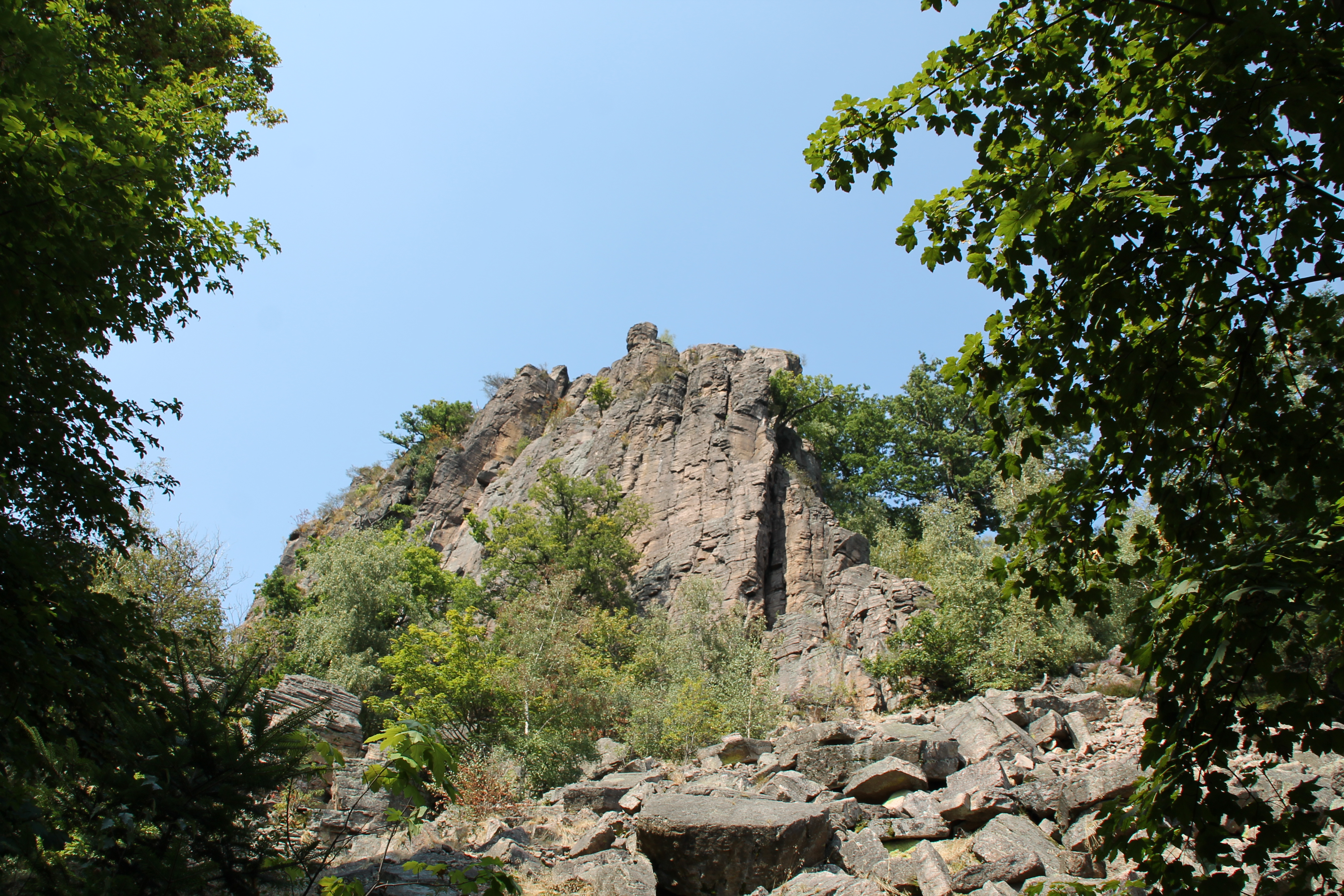
The Badener Wand with its stone run seen from the lower rock path

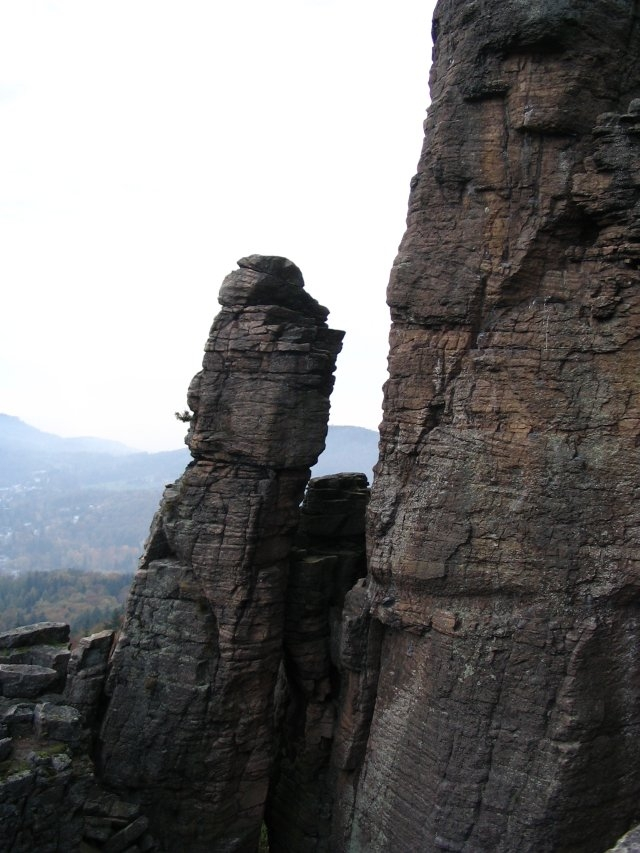
Blockgrat: the step from the little photography tower to the massif

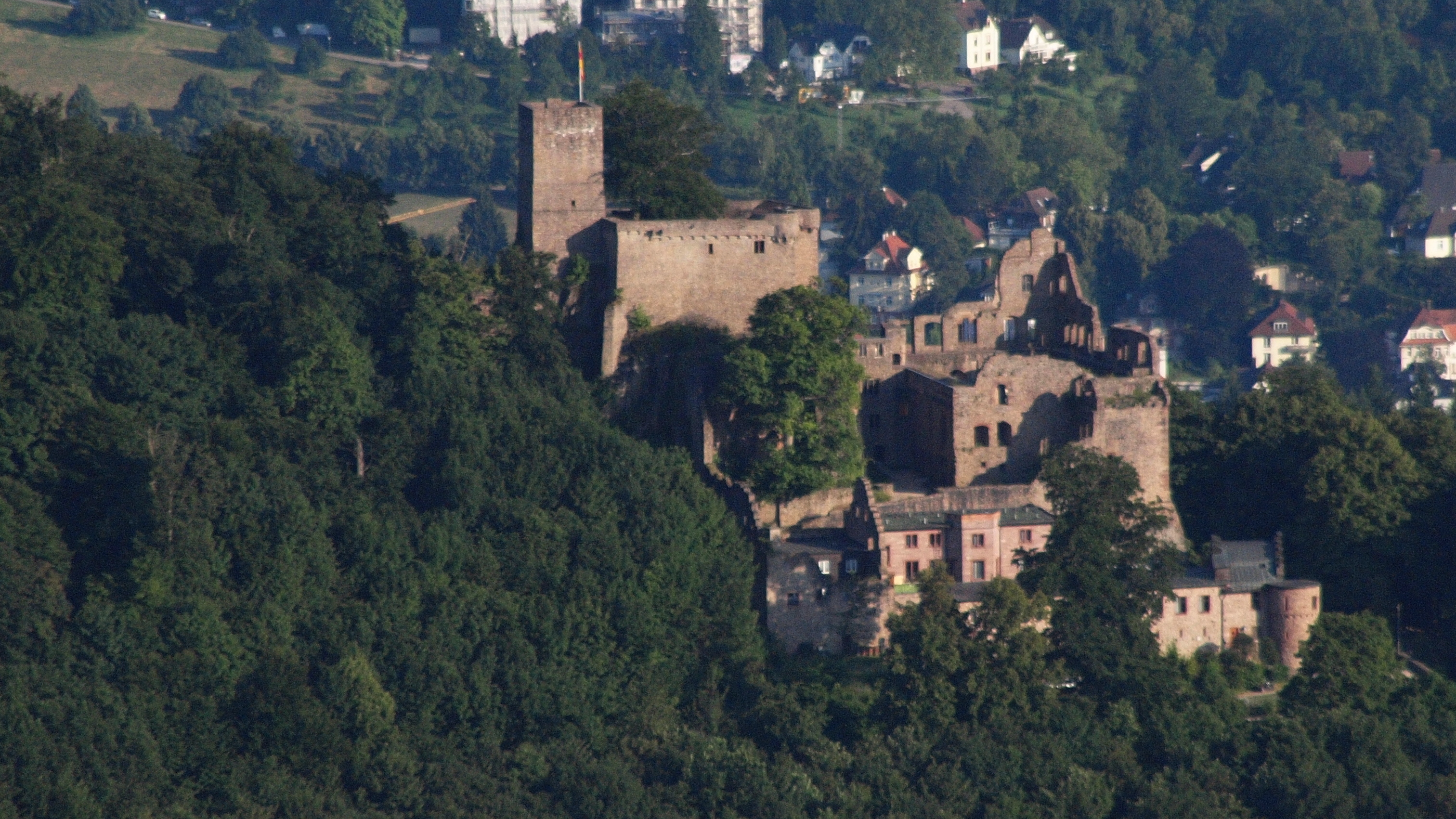
Ruins of Hohenbaden Castle

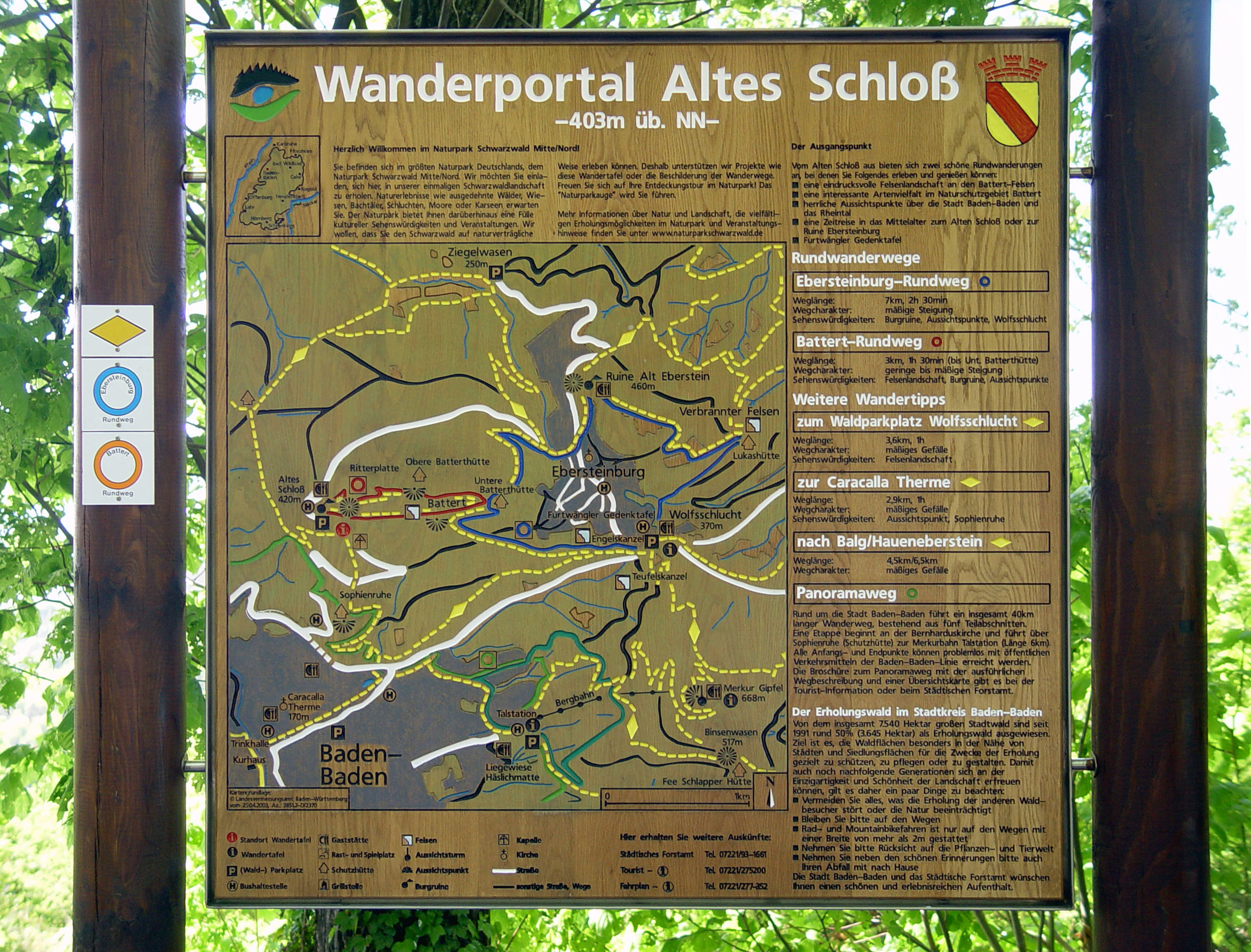
Hiking portal

== Literature ==
- Kletterführer Schwarzwald Nord. 2. Auflage, Panico Alpinverlag, Köngen, 2013, ISBN 978-3-95611-004-7.
- Urban Schurhammer: Der Battert – Ein Kletterführer durch die Felsen bei Baden-Baden. Verlag Sektion Karlsruhe des Deutschen und Österreichischen Alpenvereins, Karlsruhe, um 1928 (out of print)
